= List of Southern California transit agencies =

Many transit agencies serve Southern California. They range from large organizations serving thousands of people to one-route services provided by local cities. The majority of these agencies mainly serve localized areas of Los Angeles County. In many cases, some agencies bus routes overlap in the same area with other bus agencies.

== Multi County Agencies ==
=== Amtrak California ===
Amtrak California, operates two inter city rail lines via San Joaquins Joint Powers Authority, and LOSSAN Rail Corridor Agency providing service in Southern California with Hubs in Los Angeles and Bakersfield.

=== Amtrak Thruway ===
Amtrak thruway, operating through the San Joaquins Joint Powers Authority, and LOSSAN Rail Corridor Agency, operate several bus routes within Southern California. Popular routes do not require Amtrak tickets and are called city-to-city bus only thruway bus tickets. Transit hubs are Los Angeles Union Station and the Bakersfield station. LOSSAN Rail Corridor Agency has a Rail 2 Rail agreement that allows North County Transit District Coaster pass holders to ride Amtrak California at no additional cost.

=== Metrolink ===
The Metrolink rail service operates eight commuter rail routes throughout Southern California. Metrolink has an agreement with LOSSAN Rail Corridor Agency to allow Metrolink monthly pass holders to use Amtrak California trains via the Rail 2 Rail program at no cost within certain corridors.

== Imperial County Transit Agencies ==
=== Calexico On Demand ===
The city of Calexico launched demand response transit to fill gaps from Imperial Valley transit within city limits

=== Imperial Valley Transit ===
Imperial Valley Transit is the main transit operator in Imperial County.

=== IVT Ride Now ===
The Imperial County Transportation Commission operates IVT Ride Now. It provides demand response service in Brawley, El Centro, and West Shores

=== Yuma County Area Transit ===
Yuma County Area Transit operates two routes within Imperial county. These routes are funded by the Imperial County Transportation Commission.

== Kern County Transit Agencies ==
=== Arvin Transit ===
Arvin Transit is the local transit operator for the city of Arvin, and also offers service to Tejon Ranch and downtown Bakersfield.

=== California City Transit ===
California City transit is a general purpose Dial-a-Ride operator within the city of California City.

=== Golden Empire Transit ===
Golden Empire Transit is the main transit operator within the city of Bakersfield.

=== Kern Transit ===
Kern Transit is the primary rural transit operator in Kern County. Kern Transit coordinates with Eastern Sierra Transit in Lancaster and Inyokern.

=== Ridgecrest Transit ===
Ridgecrest Transit, also known as Ridgerunner, is the city of Ridgecrest's local transit system. Ridgecrest Transit operates five fixed routes and one lifeline route to Randsburg and Johannesburg on Fridays. Ridgecrest Transit passengers are able to transfer to Eastern Sierra Transit in Inyokern and Kern Transit at city hall.

=== Taft Area Transit ===
The city of Taft operates Taft Area Transit, providing service to Maricopa.

== Los Angeles County Transit Agencies ==
All transit agencies in Los Angeles County receive funding from LA Metro.

=== Regional Operators in Los Angeles County ===
==== Antelope Valley Transit Authority ====
Antelope Valley Transit Authority is the local transit agency serving the cities of Palmdale, Lancaster and Northern Los Angeles. It also provides commuter express service between the Antelope Valley and Downtown Los Angeles, the San Fernando Valley and the Century City/Westwood/UCLA area.

==== Foothill Transit ====
Foothill Transit operates fixed-route bus services in 22 member cities in the San Gabriel and Pomona valleys in eastern Los Angeles County. Foothill Transit currently operates Duarte eBus shuttles under contract.

==== Long Beach Transit ====
Long Beach Transit runs 39 fixed routes, serving city of Long Beach and surrounding areas. In 2019 Long beach transit took over City of Paramount, Easy Rider Transit operations due to city of Paramount budget constraints

==== Hollywood Bowl Shuttle ====
The Hollywood Bowl operates 18 bus routes that serve the Hollywood bowl from park and ride lots within Los Angeles County The routes, which operate under the name Bowl Shuttle, are free for Metrolink riders from the Downtown Burbank Metrolink station and the LA Metro B Line Hollywood/Highland Station.

==== Los Angeles Metro ====
The Los Angeles County Metropolitan Transportation Authority, branded as Metro, operates bus, light rail, heavy rail and bus rapid transit services in Los Angeles County. It also provides funding and directs planning for rail and freeway projects within Los Angeles County, funding 27 local transit agencies as well as paratransit services.

=== Municipal Operators in Los Angeles County ===
==== Alhambra Community Transit ====
Alhambra operates two transit routes with the ACT system. The Green Line runs as a city loop, with Valley Blvd and Main St as the key arteries of travel. This route runs six days per week in both a clockwise and counterclockwise direction. The Blue Line runs on weekdays from the Alhambra Civic Center to California State University, Los Angeles and its associated Metro Busway and Metrolink station.

==== Arcadia Transit ====
Arcadia operates fixed route and curb-to-curb service that is open to the general public and travels around the city limits. Connects with the Metro A line at the Arcadia Station and serves The Shops at Santa Anita and the LA County Arboretum.

==== Artesia Transit ====
Artesia operates one free bus route that operates Tuesday through Saturday within city limits.

==== Baldwin Park Transit ====
Two routes provide local transportation in Baldwin Park. The primary shuttle routes are the Teal Line and Pumpkin Line. The Teal Line operates in a clockwise loop through the suburb, while the Pumpkin Line operates a very similar loop in a counterclockwise direction. Both routes operate seven days per week.

==== Beach Cities Transit ====
Beach Cities Transit provides local bus service in the coastal cities of Redondo Beach, Hermosa Beach, Manhattan Beach, and El Segundo in Los Angeles County.

==== Bellflower Bus ====
Bellflower Bus provides local bus service through Bellflower five days per week. Two loops are contained in the system, each covering a different half of the city. The North route services the northern half of the city, primarily running along Bellflower Boulevard, Somerset Ave., and Rosecrans Ave. The South route provides service to the south end of the city, running along Lakewood Blvd., Artesia Blvd., and Woodruff Ave. Service is provided every half-hour between the hours of 7 A.M. and 5 P.M.

==== Bell Gardens Trolley ====
The city of Bell Gardens features one bus route, a clockwise city loop that runs Monday through Saturday. The service operates approximately once every 20 minutes until 5:30pm.

==== Big Blue Bus ====
Big Blue Bus runs 20 routes, and primarily serves the city of Santa Monica and the greater westside region of Los Angeles County.

==== Beverly Hills Trolley ====
Beverly Hills operates a free trolley shuttle between the Beverly Hills Civic Center and Dayton Way. The shuttle runs on weekends only between 11am and 4:30pm, on an hourly schedule.

==== Calabasas Public Transportation ====
The City of Calabasas operates a citywide bus and several peak hour buses. On Friday through Sunday, a tourist trolley runs through Calabasas, California. It makes an approximately one-hour loop from the historic Old Town to the retail-dominated Highlands area.

==== Cerritos on Wheels ====
The City of Cerritos owns a fleet of federally funded buses known as Cerritos On Wheels (or COW), which has stops throughout the city. The acronym, "COW," is a tribute to the city's origins as Dairy Valley, when cows outnumbered residents. The propane fueled COW also connects to Long Beach Transit, Orange County Transportation Authority, Norwalk Transit or Los Angeles MTA buses at overlapping stops on the borders of the city. Wi-Fi Internet access is also accessible on the buses. Route 1 loops along the east side of town between 166th Street and Del Amo Boulevard, while Route 2 travels in western portions of the municipality from Cerritos College to the civic center.

==== City of Bell Transportation ====
City of Bell Transportation operates La Campana Shuttle in Bell, Cudahy, and Bell Gardens. It also operates Dial-a-Ride and Dial-a-Cab service.

==== City of Santa Clarita Transit ====
City of Santa Clarita Transit operates local bus service in Santa Clarita and nearby surrounding unincorporated areas of Northern Los Angeles, along with commuter express service between Santa Clarita and Downtown Los Angeles, the San Fernando Valley or the Century City/Westwood/UCLA area. The McBean Regional Transit Center serves as a major hub, with connections to Metrolink and other transit agencies.

==== City of Commerce Transit ====
City of Commerce Transit operates six free bus lines within the city of Commerce.

==== Compton Renaissance Transit ====
The city of Compton has a local bus system. All five lines terminate at the transit center in downtown. Route 1 runs along Rosecrans Ave and El Segundo Blvd. Route 2 travels along Acadia Ave and Alondra Blvd. Route 3 provides access to the city's large retail development known as the Fashion Center and travels along El Segundo Blvd and Santa Fe Ave. Route 4 serves residences and facilities along Compton Blvd and Alondra Blvd. Finally, Route 5 travels to MLK Hospital and allows for light rail transfers at Artesia Station.

==== Culver CityBus ====
Culver CityBus provides public transit service around Culver City, California and the Westside, including service to Los Angeles International Airport and Westwood, Los Angeles.

==== Cudahy Area Rapid Transit ====
The city of Cudahy provides free transit within City limits in a zig zag pattern. The system allows residents to flag down the bus operator outside of scheduled stopping locations.

==== DowneyLINK ====
Four loops, one serving each quadrant of the city, provide local bus service in Downey, California. Service operates five days per week, with each line ending at Downey Depot, a major LA Metro transfer center. The Northwest route is a northwest loop, running along streets such as Brookshire Ave and Telegraph Rd. The northeastern portion of the city gains service from the Northeast route running along streets such as Lakewood Blvd and Heldon Ave. Southeastern areas in the city are served by the Southeast route, which features primary streets such as Bellflower Ave and Foster Ave. The Southwest route services the southwestern segment of Downey, with Rives Ave and Imperial Blvd as major streets.

==== El Monte Transit ====
Servicing the City of El Monte, El Monte Transit runs five fixes routes seven days a week, and two shuttles weekdays, including connections to El Monte bus and Metrolink stations.

==== Gateway Coach ====
The city of Sierra Madre operates one route under the name Gateway Coach.

==== Get Around Town Express ====
The city of South Gate operates two routes in a twenty-minute interval within South Gate and unincorporated Hollydale.

==== Glendora Transportation Division ====
The city of Glendora operates three shuttle routes. The Gold Line Commuter Shuttle offers service between the APU/Citrus College station and two parking lots at the Transit Plaza (North Route) and the Teen & Family Center (South Route) from 5 to 9 am and 4:30 to 8 pm on weekdays. The Metrolink Commuter Shuttle operates between the Transit Plaza and the Covina station from 5 to 8 am and 4 and 7pm on weekdays. Additionally, during the school days, the city operates a Midday Shuttle taking students from middle and high schools campuses to Downtown Glendora, the library, and the Teen & Family Center.

==== GO WEST Transit ====
Three routes are provided by this agency for West Covina. The Red Line serves the eastern portion of the city, using Workman Avenue as a major street in its journey as it provides service to both the Eastland Center and Plaza West Covina. The circuit winds back to its beginning by passing the city's high school and Cortez Park. Western areas of the town are served by the more tightly routed Blue Line, which begins by travelling along Sunset and Lark Ellen Avenues in the northern sectors of the municipality, before looping through the city center. The Green Line is the only non-loop in the system, as it heads south from Cortez Park through hilly suburbs using Nogales Street as a main thoroughfare.

==== Huntington Park Express ====
The city of Huntington Park operates a single shuttle route called Huntington Park Express or HP Express. Service is provided Monday through Saturday on a loop that winds around the city every 25 minutes.

==== I-Line shuttle ====
The city of Inglewood operates one free shuttle route called I-Line shuttle in a clockwise route within city limits.

==== Kanan Shuttle ====
Kanan Shuttle is a free bus service that operates between Oak Park and Agoura Hills. The transit system is Funded by the County of Ventura, City of Agoura Hills, and the Oak Park Unified School District. The transit is operated under contract by Thousand Oaks Transit.

==== La Puente Link ====
La Puente is served by a single shuttle loop, which was established in 2001. The route winds through the city, heading as far north as Hacienda Boulevard, as far west as Puente Avenue, and as far east as Guzman Avenue.

==== Lawndale Beat ====
In the city of Lawndale, two shuttle routes are provided, each of which serves the Redondo Beach station in the adjacent city of Redondo Beach. The Residential Route winds through the city between the South Bay Galleria and Rosecrans Avenue, serving various side streets. The Express Route travels directly from the Galleria along Hawthorne Boulevard and Marine Avenue to the train station.

==== Los Angeles County Public Works (LAGoBus) ====
The County of Los Angeles operates twenty eight routes under 5 transit networks for unincorporated Los Angeles.

- El Sol shuttle operates four routes and operates in East Los Angeles
- Sunshine Shuttle operates two routes in South Whittier
- The Link operates six routes in South Los Angeles county

Other shuttles have the name of the unincorporated area they serve. However these buses all have LAGoBus branding.

The County of Los Angeles also operates Transit shuttles under the "Beach Bus" branding. Of the 8 routes under the Beach Bus, only one operates year-round along Topanga Canyon

==== Los Angeles Department of Transportation (Commuter Express and DASH) ====
The Los Angeles Department of Transportation operates transit and paratransit services within the City of Los Angeles, including Commuter Express and DASH bus services, and the CityRide Paratransit Service.

Commuter Express is a rush hour express bus service. Most Commuter Express serve Downtown Los Angeles, with others to jobs centers in Pasadena, El Segundo, Century City, and Long Beach.

DASH operates over 30 shuttle routes in Downtown Los Angeles and other neighborhoods within the city, complementing Metro's longer bus routes, rail lines and bus rapid transit corridors.

==== Lynwood Breeze ====
Lynwood features four local bus lines. Route A provides a short inner loop that connects with the Lynwood station, with Bullis Road and Long Beach Boulevard as major streets. Atlantic Avenue and East Imperial Highway are the major streets of Route B, which serves Atlantic Crossings Shopping Center. Route C serves St. Francis Medical Center while traversing a southernly loop, while Route D travels from St. Francis Medical Center to Willowbrook/Rosa Parks station.

==== LAX ====
LAX operates the LAX FlyAway Transit service to move Transit passengers from Downtown LA to LAX, and Van Nuys to LAX. LAX also is constructing SkyLink to bridge the gap between LA Metro and the airport terminals, scheduled to open in 2026.

==== Maywood Express ====
The City of Maywood operates dial-a-ride for senior and disabled residents. Maywood also operates one fixed route within city limits.

==== Norwalk Transit ====
Norwalk Transit runs six routes primarily servicing city of Norwalk and other surrounding cities, including connections to the Norwalk bus/rail and Metrolink stations

==== Pasadena Transit ====
Pasadena Transit runs 11 routes servicing the city of Pasadena.

==== Palos Verdes Peninsula Transit Authority ====
The Palos Verdes Peninsula Transit Authority is primary provider of mass transportation in the Los Angeles suburbs of Rancho Palos Verdes, Palos Verdes Estates, Rolling Hills, and Rolling Hills Estates, California

==== Rosemead Explorer ====
The municipality of Rosemead operates two interlined bus lines, with Route 1 running clockwise and Route 2 traveling over the same area counterclockwise. The main termini of the loop are Montebello Town Center and Rosemead Square, with Walnut Grove and Garvey Avenue serving as major streets.

==== San Fernando Trolley ====
One circular fixed route, the result of consolidating two former fixed routes.

==== Torrance Transit ====
Torrance Transit runs 12 fixed routes, primarily serving South Bay region of Los Angeles County.

==== West Hollywood Cityline ====
Marketed as a supplemental service, a pair of interlined loops travel the main streets of West Hollywood. The Eastbound Orange Route starts near Cedars Sinai Medical Center then winding alongside streets as it routinely provides service to amenities off the mainlines of North San Vicente and Santa Monica Boulevards. The Westbound Blue Route heads West from the Gateway Center at La Brea and Santa Monica Boulevard. Cityline is mostly a paratransit service, but everyone can ride it for free. In every direction, the buses go in frequencies of 30 min. (as listed in the timetable). Cityline's transit hours are: Monday-Saturday from 9:00 AM to 6:00 PM

Cityline also offers a commuter route that runs during peak hours in fifteen minute intervals, and connects to the Metro B line Hollywood/Highland station.

City of West Hollywood also operates a weekend trolley on Santa Monica boulevard under the WEHo Pickup branding

=== Paratransit and Demand Response Operators in Los Angeles County ===
==== Access Services ====
Access Services is the designated Consolidated Transportation Services Agency for Los Angeles County appointed by the Los Angeles County Metropolitan Transportation Authority. Access Services provides paratransit transportation to disabled residents within Los Angeles County.

==== Agoura Hills Transportation Services ====
Agoura Hills funds Agoura Hills Transit as a general population dial-a-ride. The city also operates AH-Go in a city-sponsored rideshare program.

==== Avalon Transit ====
Avalon used to operate one fixed route in downtown Avalon. In 2024, The city of Avalon changed its fixed route to demand response micro shuttles

==== Covina Transit ====
Covina provides citywide dial-a-ride services for residents within the City of Covina.

==== DASH Transit ====
The city of Lakewood operates DASH Transit, which is a paratransit and senior citizen operator within city limits.

==== Diamond Ride ====
The City of Diamond Bar operates a dial-a-ride shuttle for seniors over the age of 60. it also provides transportation to disabled residents over the age of 18. Diamond Ride was launched in 1995.

==== La Mirada Transit ====
The city of La Mirada operates a dial-a-ride shuttle system within city limits.

==== Monrovia Transit ====
Monrovia transit service used to consist of one fixed line, named The Old Town Trolley and a dial-a-ride system. Trolley Service was discontinued in 2011 In 2018, The City of Monrovia rebranded its dail-a-ride service as a paratransit only operation named GoMonrovia. In 2023, Monrovia Transit partnered with Lyft to provide 24 hour paratransit service and payment services

==== Pico Rivera Transit ====
Pico Rivera Transit is the Dial-A-Ride Operator for seniors within the city of Pico Rivera

==== Pomona Valley Transportation Authority ====
Serves the cities of Pomona, Claremont, LaVerne, and San Dimas. Programs include the Pomona Valley Get About program for seniors and disabled, Claremont Dial-a-Ride for all ages, Pomona Group Services, and San Dimas Dial-a-Cab for all ages.

==== South Pasadena Transit ====
South Pasadena GoldLink was provided by the city of South Pasadena was discontinued. Buses used to travel into various quadrants of the city from the South Pasadena station. The Yellow Route uses Orange Grove and Fair Oaks Avenues to serve the northern portion of the city, while the Pink Route uses Oak Street and Wilmington Drive as major streets heading south. Similarly, the Red Route heads east along Monterrey Road to Garfield Avenue, and the Blue Route winds into the hills along Camino del Sol and Via del Ray. Money for South Pasadena Gold link was transferred over to South Pasadena's Dail-a-Ride senior program

==== RideSG ====
RideSG is the City of San Gabriel on demand public transportation service within city limits. Disabled passengers are allowed to use the city shuttle five miles outside the city limits for fifty cents.

=== University Operators in Los Angeles County ===
==== Bronco Express Shuttle ====
Cal Poly Pomona currently operates three bus lines that shuttle university students, staff, and campus visitors around campus. The third route provides a link to the Pomona North Metrolink station and the Silver Streak to Downtown Los Angeles and the Montclair Transit Center.

==== Bruin Bus ====
UCLA operates five bus lines that circulate around campus to students, staff, and campus visitors. The transit system also provides transit access to the Westwood Village.

== Orange County Transit Agencies ==
=== Anaheim Resort Transportation ===
Anaheim Resort Transportation is the public transportation system that shuttles tourists around Anaheim resorts.

==== FRAN ====
The city of Anaheim also operates a downtown shuttle called FRAN, as a way reduce congestion in downtown Anaheim

=== Anteater Express ===
UC Irvine operates three transit routes for students, staff, and visitors of UC Irvine. The Fourth route is limited to students and staff. This fourth route serves the UC Irvine Medical Center

=== Balboa Peninsula Trolley ===
Balboa Peninsula Trolley is Newport Beach' city shuttle system, using a Tourist trolley. It consists of one route and travels around the Balboa Peninsula.

=== Dana Point Trolley ===
The city of Dana Point operates two bus routes along beach. provides transfers between Languna Beach Transit, Laguna Nigel trolley, San Juan Capistrano trolley, and the San Clemente Trolley

=== Grove District Transit ===
In March 2026, the city of Garden Grove launched its own transit system, Grove District Transit, to serve Disneyland consisting of three routes

=== Huntington Beach Circuit ===
In order to reduce congestion in downtown Huntington Beach, the city contracted out its transit service to provide an on demand shuttle service to tourist

=== Irvine Connect ===
Due to budget constraints at OCTA, the City of Irvine launched its own shuttle service called Irvine Connect

=== Laguna Beach Transit ===
Laguna Beach has two methods of transportation. The first method is the Laguna Beach Trolley, which consists of two bus routes. The second is an on-demand service called Laguna Local.

=== Laguna Nigel Trolley ===
Laguna Nigel operated one shuttle along from the crown valley mall to Dana Point

=== Mission Viejo Shuttle ===
Mission Viejo Shuttle is a one route city-owned transportation system serving the city of Mission Viejo It includes connections to the Laguna Niguel/Mission Viejo station and Saddleback College.

=== OCTA ===
The Orange County Transportation Authority operates buses in Orange County, California. It also operates The city of Irvine iShuttle, which consists of four weekday commuter shuttles serving major employers, residential areas, shopping centers, and transportation facilities. Two lines, Route A and Route B, connect the Tustin Metrolink Station to the Irvine Business Complex area. Route A provides service between the Tustin Metrolink Station and John Wayne Airport with stops along Von Karman Avenue. Route B heads along Jamboree Road before continuing through Main Street and Michelson Drive. The remaining two lines, Route C and Route D, offer connections between Irvine Station and the Irvine Spectrum Area, which includes major employers, the Irvine Spectrum Center, and residential communities The Park and The Village. Route C follows Irvine Center Drive and ends at the Capital Group campus, while Route D serves the Irvine Spectrum Center, Kaiser Permanente – Irvine Medical Center, and Hoag Hospital Irvine. Currently Irvine Shuttle is directly operated by OCTA

=== Saddleback Shuttle ===
Saddleback College operates a one route shuttle system from outlying parking lots to campus buildings

=== San Clemente Trolley ===
The City of San Clemente operates two free bus routes. One bus route runs year-round, while the other operates during the peak tourist season. Offers transfers to other transit systems in Dana Point

=== San Juan Capistrano Trolley ===
The city of San Juan Capistrano operates a shuttle from Capistrano Union High School to Dana Point.

== Riverside County Transit Agencies ==
All transit agencies in Riverside County are funded directly by Riverside County Transportation Commission and is the regional transit planner

=== Banning Connect ===
Banning Connect is the successor to the Pass transit agency within Banning. Banning Connect provides three routes of service within Banning and the Cabazon/Morongo Indian Reservation. The Transit system has transfer points to Beaumont Transit, Riverside Transit Agency, SunLine Transit Agency in Beaumont

=== Beaumont Transit ===
Beaumont Transit is the transit operator for the city of Beaumont, with service throughout the city, and 6 day a week connections to the San Bernardino Transit Center.

=== Corona Cruiser ===
The city of Corona features two routes that operate Monday through Saturday. Each line connects with the North Main Metrolink Station. The Blue Line travels from the McKinley Street shopping centers, south to Mountain Gate Park, and north along Main Street before ending in the River Road/Parkridge Avenue residential areas. The Red Line runs from a residential quarter on Border Avenue, to Main Street in downtown, and eventually to The Crossings shopping center on Cajalco Road.

=== Palo Verde Valley Transit Agency ===
Centered around the city of Blythe, the Palo Verde Valley Transit Agency brands itself as The Desert Roadrunner. Route 1 City Circulator functions as a clockwise loop around Blythe, starting at city hall along Broadway and using 14th Ave, Barnard St, and Riverside Dr. as major streets. Route 2 Palo Verde College runs from Palo Verde Community College to the city center and then to Intake Blvd. via Hobsonway. Route 4 Mesa Verde/Ripley goes from Intake Blvd. via Hobsonway to the farming community of Ripley and then to Mesa Verde, before heading back to Blythe via Hobsonway. On weekday peak hours, Route 3 Express serves several California State Prisons, a major local employer, traveling along I-10 to their location in Wiley's Well.

=== Riverside Connect ===
Riverside Connect is the paratransit operator within the City of Riverside.

=== Riverside Superior Court Trolley ===
The superior Court of Riverside operates a trolley, named the Jury Trolley, as a way to reduce congestion in Downtown Riverside

=== Riverside Transit Agency ===
Riverside Transit Agency is the main transit operator for western Riverside county

=== SunLine Transit Agency ===
SunLine Transit Agency is the Consolidated Transportation Services transit agency for the Coachella Valley

== San Bernardino County Transit Agencies ==
All transit agencies in San Bernardino County are funded directly by San Bernardino County Transportation Authority and is the regional transit planner

=== Basin Transit ===
Basin Transit is the transit operator within the Morongo Valley in San Bernardino County. Rural routes operate on a flag stop basis.

=== Mountain Transit ===
Mountain Transit is the transit operator in the San Bernardino mountains. Provides off the mountain service to downtown San Bernardino

=== Needles Area Transit ===
Needles Area Transit is the City of Needles public transportation provider. operates two interlined routes in 30 minute intervals

=== Omnitrans ===
Omnitrans is the Consolidated Transportation Services transit agency for southwest San Bernardino County

=== Victor Valley Transit Authority ===
Victor Valley Transit Authority is the Consolidated Transportation Services transit agency for Northwest San Bernardino County

== San Diego County Transit Agencies ==
=== Chula Vista Community Shuttle ===
The city of Chula Vista operates a demand response transit shuttle in Downtown Chula Vista

=== Chula Vista Bayfront Shuttle ===
The city of Chula Vista also operates a separate Shuttle two line shuttle system connecting the Chula vista bayfront to the E street transit center

=== Metropolitan Transit System ===
The San Diego Metropolitan Transit System operates most of the public transit in San Diego County, including the San Diego Trolley.

=== North County Transit District ===
The North County Transit District operates public transit in North County of San Diego County, including the SPRINTER rail service and the COASTER rail service.

=== San Diego Flyer ===
The Port of San Diego operates the San Diego Flyer between Old Town Transit Center and the San Diego airport

=== Triton Transit ===
UC San Diego currently operates Eight bus lines that shuttles university students, staff, and campus visitors around campus.

== Santa Barbara County Transit Agencies ==
=== City of Lompoc Transit ===
City of Lompoc operates a six route transit system locally known as COLT that shuttles residents from Santa Barbara and Solvang to Lompoc

=== Clean Air Express ===
Clean Air Express is the Commuter route agency that shuttles commuters from Santa Maria to the City of Santa Barbara via four routes

=== Santa Barbara Metropolitan Transit District ===
The Santa Barbara Metropolitan Transit District (MTD) is a public transit agency providing bus service in the southern portion of Santa Barbara County, California. It serves the cities of Santa Barbara, Carpinteria, and Goleta as well as the unincorporated areas of Montecito, Summerland, and Isla Vista.

=== Santa Maria Regional Transit ===
Santa Maria Regional Transit is the city owned transit agency for the city of Santa Maria that operates 18 bus routes and one demand response route within northern Santa Barbara County and San Luis Obispo County

==== Guadalupe Transit ====
The city of Guadalupe operates the Guadalupe Shuttle, the Guadalupe Flyer to Santa Maria and ADA service. It is now operated by Santa Maria Regional Transit as of June 2025

=== Santa Ynez Valley Transit ===
This agency provides service to the communities of Buellton, Solvang, Santa Ynez, and Los Olivos, California. Route A provides a clockwise route through above communities, using Route 246 as its main thoroughfare, while Route B travels in the opposite direction.

=== UC Santa Barbara Transportation & Parking Services ===
Until March 2020, UC Santa Barbara operated a commuter shuttle named Surfliner Shuttle Vanpool that ferried students, staff, and visitors to the Goleta Amtrak station. It is unknown if/when the shuttle will resume service.

== San Luis Obispo County Transit Agencies ==
=== Atascadero Transit ===
Since 1979, the city of Atascadero has provided dial-a-ride service. Over the last decade, this has been complemented by one fixed route, the North County Shuttle. Six days per week, this line connects Atascadero, Paso Robles and Cuesta College.

=== Morro Bay Transit ===
The city of Morro Bay operates a two route transit system that circulates city limits.

=== San Luis Obispo Regional Transit Authority ===
San Luis Obispo Regional Transit Authority is the county transit operator for the County of San luis obispo

SLORTA also operates under contract the following transit agencies

==== Paso Express ====
On Monday through Saturday, the city of Paso Robles features a loop bus service. The line runs along Spring St and Riverside Blvd as major streets on the west bank of the Salinas River, while Creston Rd and Ramboulliet Rd are primary east bank highways.

==== South County Area Transit ====
Due to failure to meet farebox revenue, South County Area Transit contracted with SLORTA for transit service. The South County Transit Committee sets funding for transit service

=== SLO Transit ===
The city of San Luis Obispo operates SLO Transit which is a 9 route transit system.

== Ventura Country Transit Agencies ==
=== Gold Coast Transit District ===
The largest transit operator in Ventura County, GCTD is a Special District formed by Oxnard, Ojai, Port Hueneme, Ventura and County of Ventura to operate fixed route and paratransit service. It operates 17 fixed routes, with a fleet of 61 buses, carrying over 3.7 million passengers annually. The service is directly operated with 228 employees. www.gctd.org

=== Camarillo Area Transit ===
Camarillo's transit system, Camarillo Area Transit (CAT), is built around one fixed route and a dial-a-ride system. The standard line runs as a loop from city hall to Leisure Village Road. The City of Camarillo has contracted operations and maintenance of its transit system to RATP Dev.

=== Moorpark City Transit ===
The city of Moorpark features two bus routes. Route 1 begins at city hall then winds through the city center, toward Mountain Meadows Plaza in the south, before ending at Villa del Arroyo in the northeastern part of town. Route 2 also begins at city hall and ends just north of Route 1's terminus at Moorpark College, traveling through a more centralized path than its counterpart.

=== Ojai Trolley ===
Ojai Trolley operates two bus routes within the city of Ojai

=== Simi Valley Transit ===
The city of Simi Valley contains a four-line bus service, running Monday through Saturday. Route A services Simi Valley Town Center and the Simi Valley station, with Cochran St, Royal Ave, and Los Angeles Ave as major thoroughfares. Route B runs an extended version of Route A, running past the same locales mentioned above, before deviating to travel further west on Cochran and Royal. Route C begins its route at city hall and services the Simi Valley station and the Chatsworth station. Los Angeles Ave and Topanga Canyon Blvd are primary streets for this route. Route D begins at the Ronald Reagan Presidential Library, travels to Simi Valley Town Center, and ends at the Simi Valley Civic Center, with featured major streets including Madera Rd, First St, and Alamo St.

=== Thousand Oaks Transit ===
Provides public transportation services throughout Thousand Oaks and Newbury Park.

=== VCTC Intercity ===
VCTC Intercity is the commuter bus transit agency in Ventura county. VCTC took over Fillmore Area Transit. Formerly providing service around, and commuter services from Fillmore. VCTC also took over the Santa Paula Commuter Bus, which was one fixed route and a dial-a-ride service in Santa Paula.

=== Valley Express Transit Service ===
Valley Express is a Transit operator in the Heritage Valley of Ventura County. It provides six routes that serve the communities of Piru, Fillmore, and Santa Paula
