= Kesling =

Kesling is a surname. Notable people with the surname include:

- Harold Kesling (1901–1979), American orthodontist
- Laura Ann Kesling (born 2000), American actress
- Peter Kesling (1932–2022), American orthodontist, son of Harold
- William Kesling (1899–1983), American architect
