= Los Algodones =

Town and borough in Baja California, Mexico

- Town and Municipality
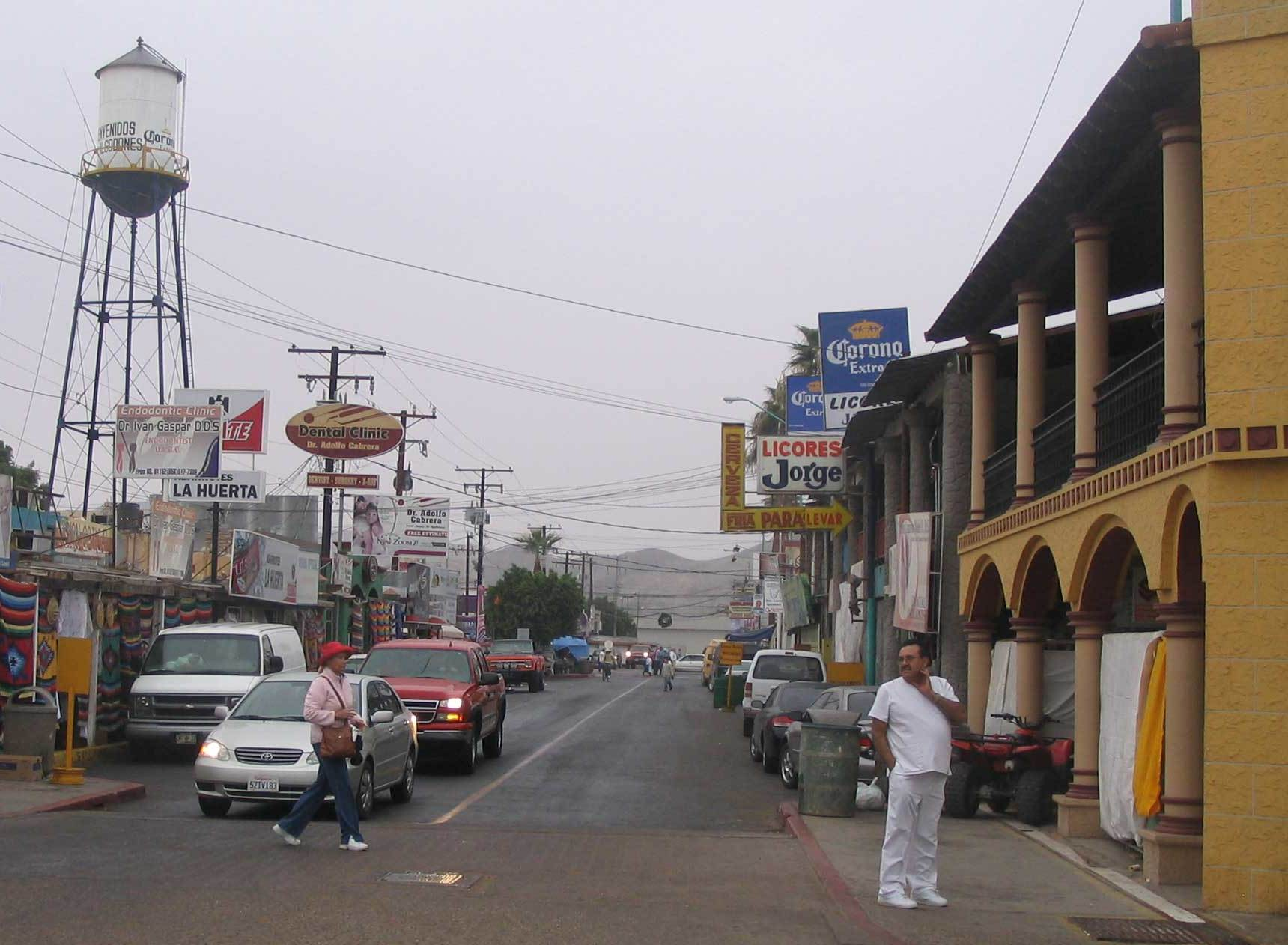
- View down Calle Dos
- Nickname: Molar City
- Location within Baja California Location within Mexico
- Coordinates: 32°42′55″N 114°43′44″W
- Country: Mexico
- State: Baja California
- Municipality: Mexicali
- Elevation: 108 ft (33 m)

Population (2010)
  - Total: 5,474
- Time zone: UTC–08:00 (Zona Noroeste)
  - Summer (DST): UTC–07:00 (DST)
- Area code: +52 658

Los Algodones (English: The cottons), is a town and borough in the municipality of Mexicali, Baja California, Mexico. It is also commonly identified as Vicente Guerrero. Located on the United States-Mexico border to the north and east, Los Algodones is south of Andrade, California, and close to five miles west of downtown Yuma, Arizona. It reported a population of 5,474 in the 2010 Mexican census. Los Algodones is popularly referred to as "Molar City" due to hundreds of dentists that cater to Americans seeking affordable dental care outside of the United States.

== Etymology ==
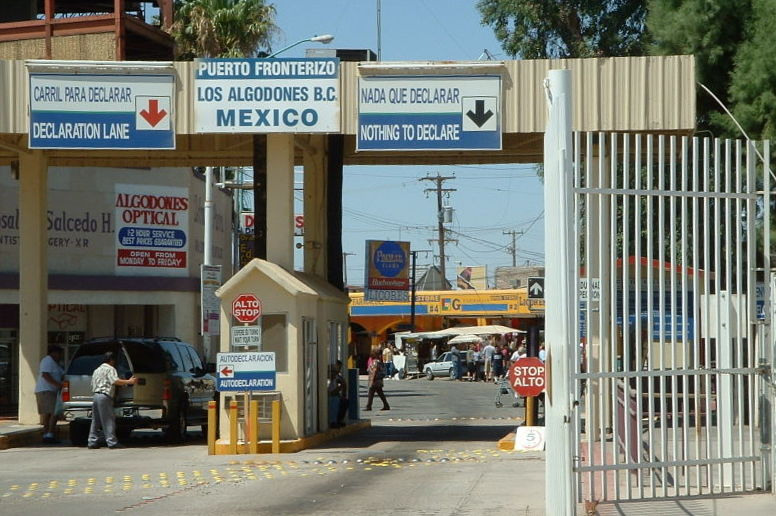
The Andrade Port of Entry connects Los Algodones to Andrade, California.

The Spanish-language name Los Algodones translates into English as "the cotton plants". The origin of the name is unknown.

== Geography ==
Los Algodones is the northernmost town in Mexico, and at its northeastern tip is the northernmost point in the state of Baja California, and in Latin America. Because of its unique location, it is possible to travel due north, south, east or west from Los Algodones and intersect with the US border.

From the U.S., Los Algodones is most easily reached via Interstate 8 and south a short distance (3.33 Km / 2.07 mi) along State Route 186/Andrade Road to the international border at Andrade, California. From Andrade, visitors park their vehicles and walk across the border, or drive across.

The town is at an elevation of 110 feet/33.5 m above mean sea level.

=== Climate ===
Climate data for Los Algodones (Presa Morelos) 1991–2020
| Month | Jan | Feb | Mar | Apr | May | Jun | Jul | Aug | Sep | Oct | Nov | Dec | Year |
|---|---|---|---|---|---|---|---|---|---|---|---|---|---|
| Record high °C (°F) | 31.0 (87.8) | 34.0 (93.2) | 45.0 (113.0) | 48.0 (118.4) | 47.0 (116.6) | 49.0 (120.2) | 50.0 (122.0) | 48.0 (118.4) | 48.0 (118.4) | 45.0 (113.0) | 43.5 (110.3) | 32.0 (89.6) | 50.0 (122.0) |
| Mean daily maximum °C (°F) | 21.1 (70.0) | 23.2 (73.8) | 27.3 (81.1) | 30.6 (87.1) | 35.7 (96.3) | 40.4 (104.7) | 42.3 (108.1) | 42.2 (108.0) | 39.3 (102.7) | 33.2 (91.8) | 25.9 (78.6) | 20.2 (68.4) | 31.8 (89.2) |
| Daily mean °C (°F) | 13.8 (56.8) | 15.4 (59.7) | 18.8 (65.8) | 21.8 (71.2) | 26.4 (79.5) | 30.7 (87.3) | 33.8 (92.8) | 34.0 (93.2) | 30.8 (87.4) | 24.5 (76.1) | 17.9 (64.2) | 13.1 (55.6) | 23.4 (74.1) |
| Mean daily minimum °C (°F) | 6.5 (43.7) | 7.6 (45.7) | 10.2 (50.4) | 13.0 (55.4) | 17.1 (62.8) | 21.0 (69.8) | 25.4 (77.7) | 25.7 (78.3) | 22.4 (72.3) | 15.7 (60.3) | 9.8 (49.6) | 6.1 (43.0) | 15.0 (59.0) |
| Record low °C (°F) | −4.0 (24.8) | −1.0 (30.2) | 0.1 (32.2) | 2.0 (35.6) | 7.0 (44.6) | 11.0 (51.8) | 13.0 (55.4) | 17.0 (62.6) | 2.0 (35.6) | 1.0 (33.8) | 0.0 (32.0) | −5.0 (23.0) | −5.0 (23.0) |
| Average precipitation mm (inches) | 7.3 (0.29) | 6.6 (0.26) | 6.9 (0.27) | 2.0 (0.08) | 0.8 (0.03) | 0.4 (0.02) | 4.4 (0.17) | 5.0 (0.20) | 4.7 (0.19) | 3.5 (0.14) | 5.2 (0.20) | 13.0 (0.51) | 59.8 (2.35) |
| Average precipitation days (≥ 0.1 mm) | 2.6 | 2.2 | 1.7 | 1.0 | 0.4 | 0.3 | 1.7 | 1.7 | 1.4 | 1.2 | 1.1 | 3.0 | 18.3 |
Source: Servicio Meteorologico Nacional

== Economy ==
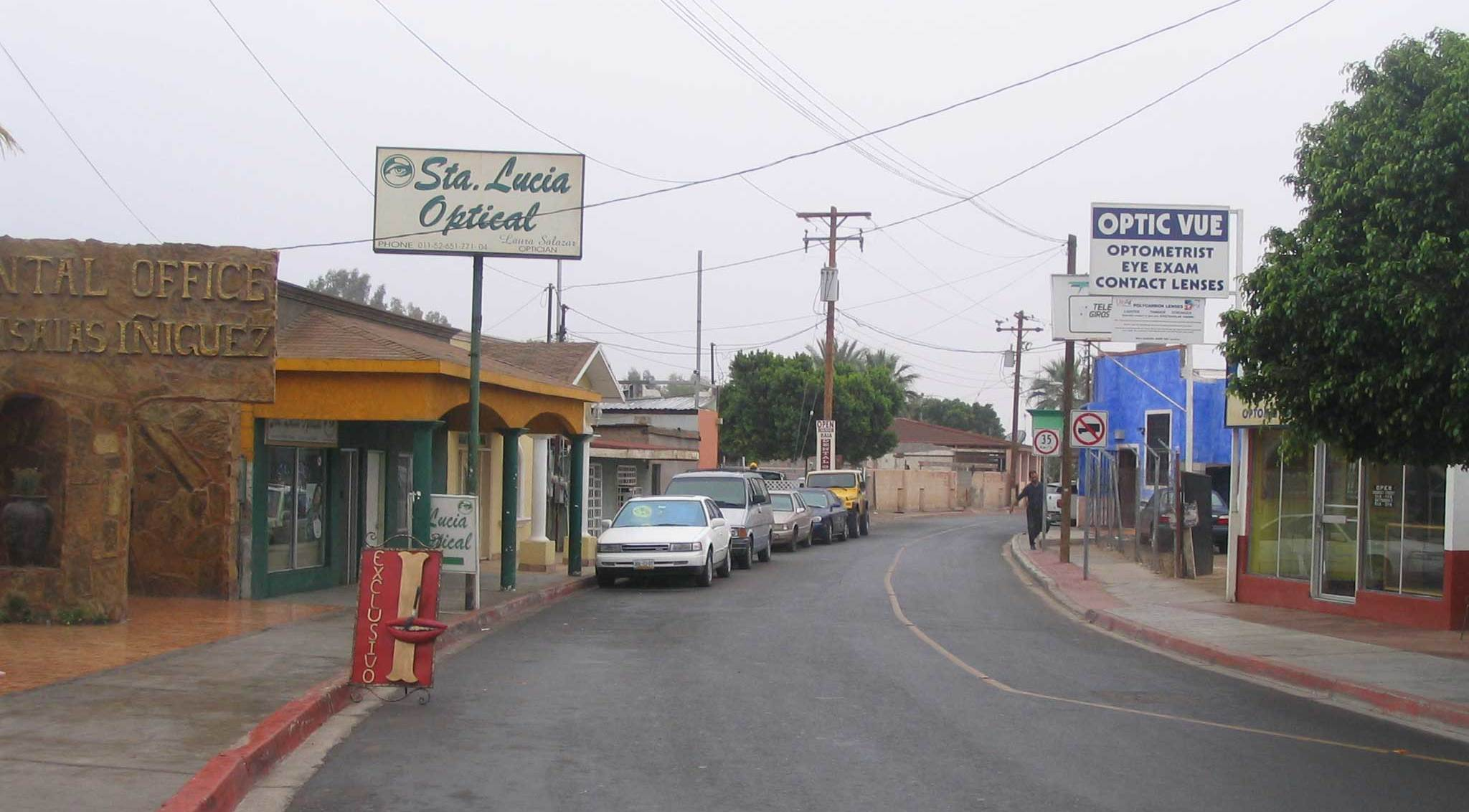
Opticians and optometrist offices.

Situated near the borders of both southeastern California and southwestern Arizona, Los Algodones has become a popular tourist attraction in recent years due in part to inexpensive shopping and restaurants as well as inexpensive medical care and prescription medicines. The warm, dry climate of the area attracts a number of snowbirds from across the United States and Canada who settle during the winter in the nearby towns of Yuma, Arizona, and Winterhaven, California. Organized day trips from the Coachella Valley are popular among seniors as well.

=== Healthcare ===
The popularity of both inexpensive prescriptions and medical care catering to Canadian and U.S. senior citizens has prompted a veritable explosion of pharmacies, opticians and dental offices since the 1980s. They have largely displaced many of the open-air shops and restaurants immediately across the border, and have effectively shifted the town's focus from tourism to medicine. Los Algodones has approximately 600 dentists who service uninsured Canadian and American health tourists who save up to 80 percent on dental services. Nevertheless, a number of shops and restaurants remain, and Los Algodones capitalizes on the tourist trade with frequent fiestas throughout the year, most notably around the Christmas season.

== Transportation ==
Transportes Miguel Siga, a private bus company, provides service between Mexicali and Los Algodones. Yuma County Area Transit provides service from Andrade to Yuma.
