= Imperial Valley Transit =

Mass transportation agency

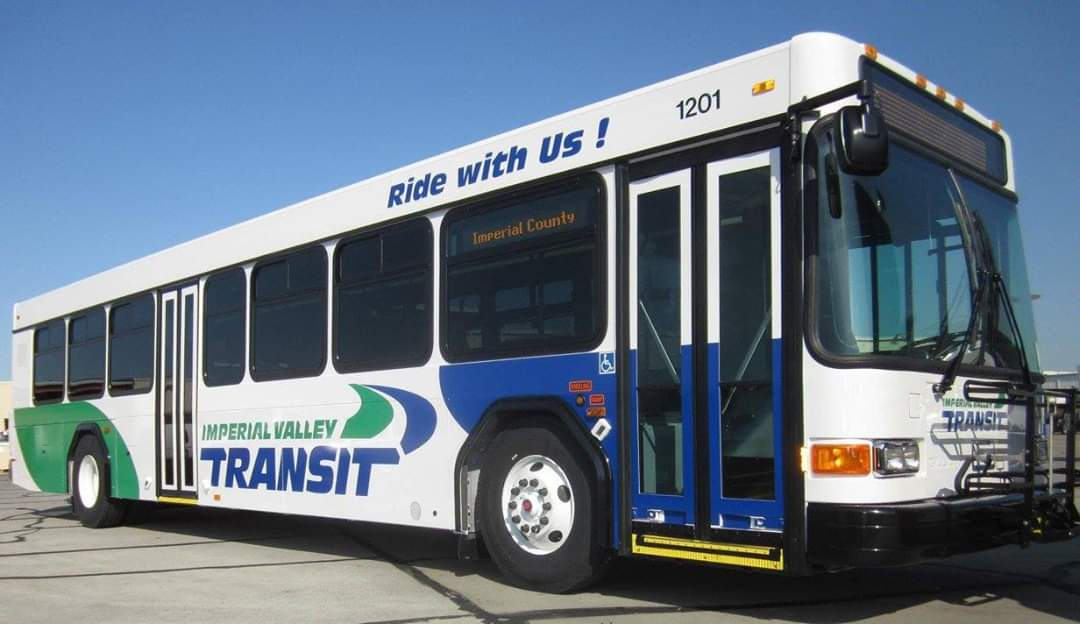
- Parent: Imperial County Transportation Commission (ICTC)
- Founded: November 1, 1989; 36 years ago
- Headquarters: 792 East Ross Road; El Centro, CA 92243
- Locale: El Centro, CA
- Service area: Imperial County, California
- Service type: bus service; express bus service; paratransit
- Routes: 14
- Stations: El Centro Regional Transit Terminal; Brawley Transit Transfer Station; Calexico Intermodal Transportation Center (environmental & design phase); Imperial Transit Park; Imperial Valley College Transfer Terminal
- Annual ridership: 842,836 (FY 2016)
- Operator: Transdev
- Chief executive: Mark Baza
- Website: ivtransit.com

Imperial Valley Transit (IVT), also known as IV Transit, is the provider of mass transportation in California's Imperial Valley, serving the cities of El Centro, Calexico, Brawley, and Imperial. Formed in 1989 with just 3 buses and serving close to 3000 passengers per month, the agency currently serves more than 73,000 passengers per month with over 20 buses in operation. Twelve routes, plus the El Centro Circulators (which are labeled as the Green Line running clockwise and the Blue Line running counterclockwise) form the structure of the system. Service is provided every day of the week except on recognized federal holidays. Two limited stop routes (the 31/32 Direct) also travel Monday-Saturday, and two express buses (the 21 & 22 IVC Express) run to Imperial Valley College when classes are in session.

== Recent developments ==
Imperial Valley Transit has been on a concentrated effort in recent years to improve transit services to the region it serves. These efforts include replacing an aging fleet from the 1990s with new vehicles. New transit stations have also been developed with more on the way planned for the cities of Calexico and Imperial. Schedules for the most in-demand routes have been expanded as well, alleviating overcrowding.

=== Partnership with YCIPTA and the Quechan Indian Tribe ===
The following routes are treated as an extension of the Imperial Valley Transit system, funded and administered by the Imperial County Transportation Commission (ICTC), Yuma County Intergovernmental Public Transportation Authority, and Quechan. The routes are operated with Yuma County Area Transit (YCAT) buses.

==== YCAT Turquoise Route 10 ====
Since its formation in 1989, IV Transit had provided public transportation to Winterhaven with an extension of Route 3 east of Holtville. This lifeline route, composed of one round trip, provided passengers in the remote community access to government and medical services in the county seat of El Centro every Wednesday.

When ICTC, administrator and funder of IV Transit, was approached by Quechan and YCIPTA to provide better transit services in the area, all agencies agreed to discontinue the extension of Route 3 east of Holtville and replace it with the newly jointly funded YCAT Turquoise Route 10. The more extensive route, effective January 7, 2013, provided two round trips a day and traveled every Monday, Wednesday, and Saturday. The route better serves Eastern Imperial County residents and connects Yuma, Winterhaven, and El Centro via Interstate 8. Further connections are available to YCAT routes at the Downtown Yuma Transit Center and IVT routes at the El Centro Regional Transit Terminal.

Though showing modest gains in ridership since then, service on Saturdays has been cut effective July 1, 2016 due to its inability to meet farebox recovery ratio performance standards. Additionally, discounts and fare passes were terminated for YCAT's Turquoise Route 10 in order to increase its chances of meeting the aforementioned standard.

As of June 30, 2017, Turquoise Route 10 achieved its standard and added a third day to its schedule effective July 1, 2018 with the addition of Fridays.

YCAT Blue Route 5

This partnership was further broaden when ICTC started to jointly fund with YCIPTA and Quechan YCAT's Blue Route 5 in FY 2016. The route, which has been around since June 1, 2012, is a circulator running in a counter clockwise direction connecting Yuma with the Fort Yuma Indian Reservation, Winterhaven, and the Quechan Casino Resort. The service further enhances the transportation options Eastern Imperial County residents have at their disposal.

And since October 20, 2013, Blue Route 5 now makes a stop at the Andrade Port of Entry. This is the first time public transit services have ever stopped at this destination.

=== Schedule Expansion ===
Part of this expansion included an increase in Saturday service beginning August 3, 2013. Buses would now run approximately every 90 minutes on Routes 1 & 2.

Trips to and from Imperial Valley College have also improved in August 2013 from an initial 7 to 11 trips a day on Route 21. Again, this alleviated overcrowding and allowed students to arrive to classes on time.

Further expansion was achieved with headway improvements from 70 to 35 minutes beginning October 1, 2013 on Route 1 during peak hours from 7 a.m. thru 5:30 p.m. The immediate results were buses running on time and less passengers being left behind at bus stops.

On December 18, 2013, the Brawley Gold Line circulator was established in the city of Brawley to better serve its residents and transferring passengers on the main bus routes of the system. It serves key destinations, providing greater mobility around the city.

Additional circulators are planned when funding becomes available with the Garnet Line in Calexico and the Red Line in Imperial.

Starting January 5, 2014, limited Sunday service was implemented between Calexico and Brawley on Routes 1 & 2 along with IVT Access, the local para transit service of Imperial Valley. This is the first time public transportation services has been provided county-wide on Sundays.

=== Transit Technology ===
In 2016, Wi-Fi has also been introduced to the entire fleet of vehicles except for the circulator routes (Blue, Gold, and Green Lines) in Brawley and El Centro. Also, most if not all vehicles have security cameras.

== Routes ==
Route	Terminals		Via	Notes
1N/1S	Calexico Hacienda Dr & Olive Av	El Centro State St & 7th St	SR-111	
2N/2S	El Centro State St & 7th St	Niland Highway 111 & Main St	SR-86	
3E/3W	El Centro State St & 7th St	Holtville 5th St & Figueroa Av	Evan Hewes Hwy	
4E/4W	El Centro State St & 7th St	Seeley Evan Hewes Hwy & Drew Rd	Evan Hewes Hwy	
21N/21S	Calexico Hacienda Dr & Olive Av	Imperial Imperial Valley College	SR-111	Express
22N/22S	Imperial Imperial Valley College	Niland Highway 111 & Main St	SR-111	Express
31D/32D	Brawley 5th St & G St	Calexico Paulin Av & 3rd St	SR-111	
41N/41S	Brawley 5th St & G St	El Centro State St & 7th St	SR-86	
45E/45W	Holtville 5th St & Holt Rd	El Centro State St & 7th St	Evan Hewes Hwy	
51N/51S	Brawley 5th St & G St	Niland Beal Rd & Low Rd	SR-111	
Blue	El Centro State St & 7th St		4th St	
Gold	Brawley 5th St & G St		Brawley Av	
Green	El Centro State St & 7th St		Imperial Av	

== Bus fleet ==
=== Active fleet ===
Make/Model	Fleet numbers	Year	Engine	Transmission
NABI 60 BRT HEV'	26-27	2010	Cummins ISL9	Allison E^{P}50 hybrid system
Freightliner M2 35 HEV'	271-273	2010	Cummins ISL9	Allison E^{P}40 hybrid system
Gillig Low Floor 40'	1201-1210	2012	Cummins ISL9	Allison B400R
Gillig Low Floor 40'	1211-1216	2015	Cummins ISL9	Allison B400R
Gillig Low Floor Hybrid 40'	1801-1830	2018	Cummins L9	Allison H 40 EP Hybrid System
Gillig Low Floor Hybrid 40'	2301-2330	2023	Cummins L9	Allison eGen Flex hybrid system
