= Calexico Mission School =

Private school in California, United States

Coordinates: 32.66596°N 115.49170°W

Calexico Mission Academy
- 601 East First Street; Calexico, California 92231

Information
- Type: Private
- Motto: Educating the Hand, the Mind, and the Heart (Spanish: Educando la mano, mente, y corazon)
- Principal: Theresa Diaz
- Faculty: 21
- Enrollment: 300
- Website: http://www.calexicomissionschool.com

Calexico Mission Academy is a school under the control of the Southeastern California Conference of the Seventh-day Adventist Church. It is a part of the Seventh-day Adventist education system, the world's second largest Christian school system. It is located in Calexico, California, United States, and has just approximately 300 students in the K–12 levels, most of whom are from the neighbouring city of Mexicali, Mexico.

== See also ==
- List of Seventh-day Adventist secondary schools
- Seventh-day Adventist education
