= Andrade, California =

Unincorporated community in California, United States

Andrade
- Locale
- Location in California Andrade (the United States)
- Coordinates: 32°43′33″N 114°43′33″W
- Country: United States
- State: California
- County: Imperial County
- Elevation: 138 ft (42 m)

Andrade is a small locale in the southeasternmost corner of the state of California, in Imperial County. The community is located entirely within the Fort Yuma Indian Reservation. It is directly across the border from Los Algodones, the northernmost town of the municipality of Mexicali, in Baja California, and in all of Mexico. The ZIP Code is 92283. The community is inside area codes 442 and 760.

== History ==
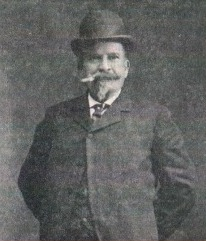
Andrade is named after General Guillermo Andrade, who founded the settlement with the California Development Company.

Pilot Knob Station served as a stop on the San Antonio-San Diego Mail Line and Butterfield Overland Stage line and its successors until the railroad arrived in 1877. The Pilot Knob Station was located at what is now Andrade, near the bank of the Colorado River at the foot of Pilot Knob, for which it was named.

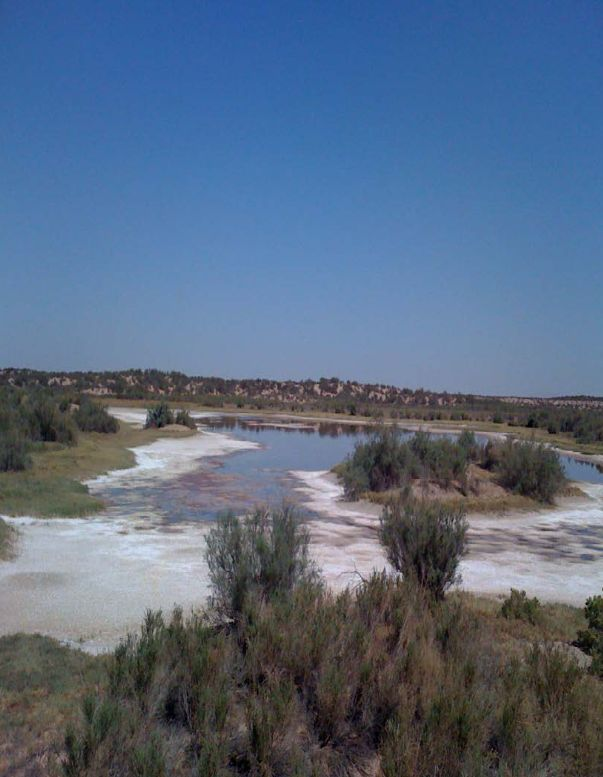
Andrade Mesa wetlands

Andrade is named after Mexican General Guillermo Andrade (1833-1905). The General sold the land for the settlement to the California Development Company. The town was named in 1912 with establishment of the post office. Andrade was in the Navy, a diplomat and a banker.

A post office operated at Andrade from 1909 to 1910 and from 1912 to 1942. The name Cantu commemorated Col. Esteban Cantu, governor of the northernmost district of Baja California from 1915 to 1920.

The Inter-California Railway formerly served Andrade.

The nearby Alamo Canal was built in 1901, the All-American Canal built in the 1930s. California State Route 186 was built in 1917 and number assigned was given in 1972.

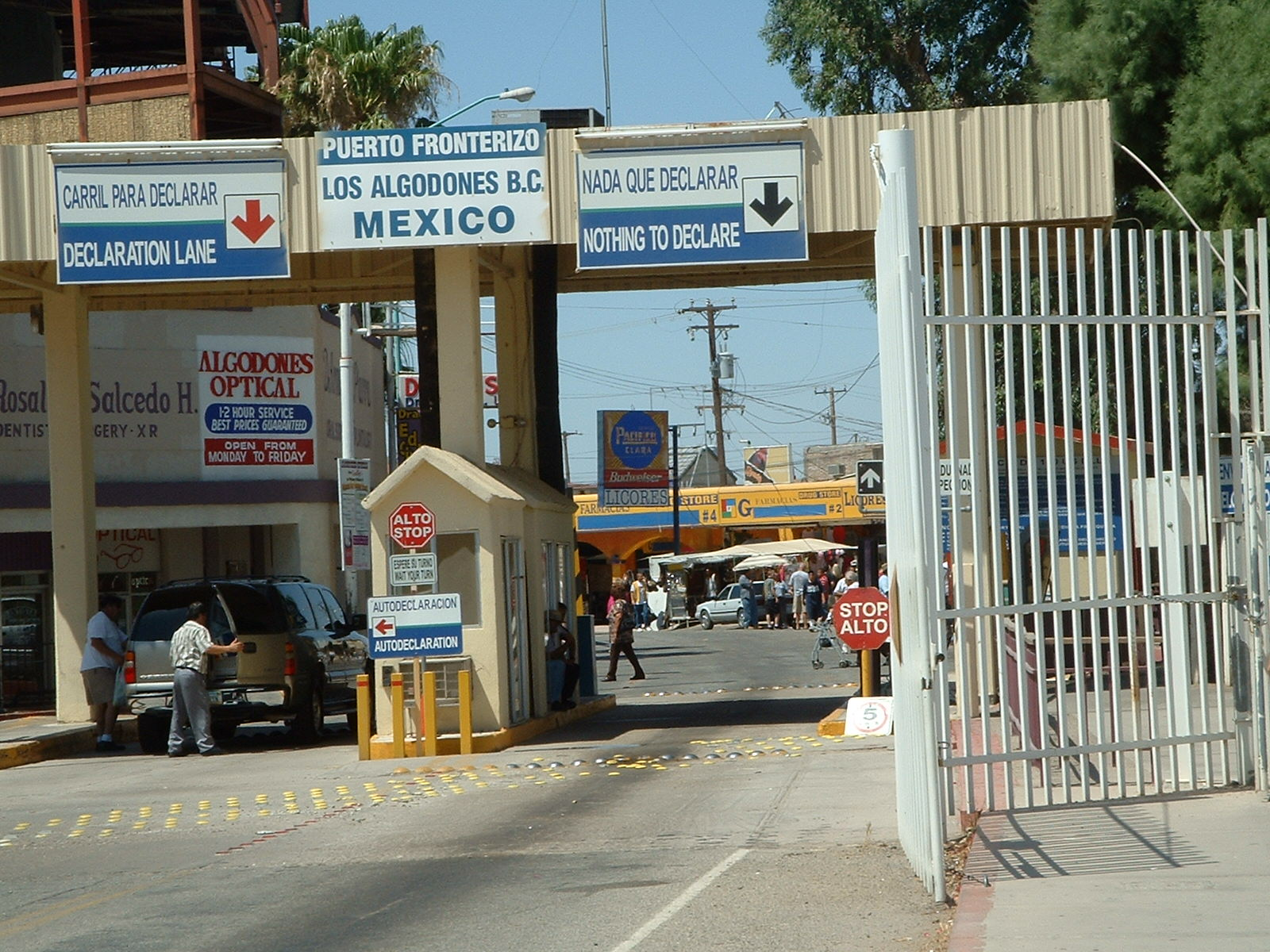
Looking across the border from Andrade into Los Algodones, Baja California (2007)

In 2000, it had a population of 59, 74.6% of whom were Hispanic or Latino. In 2016, the Sleepy Hollow RV Park in Andrade was closed by its owner, the Quechan Indian Tribe, over poor water quality.

== Climate ==
This area has a large amount of sunshine year round due to its stable descending air and high pressure. According to the Köppen Climate Classification system, Andrade has a desert climate, abbreviated "BWh" on climate maps.

== California Historical Landmark ==
Charley's World of Lost Art
- Interactive map of Charley's World of Lost Art
- Location: On dirt road about 0.5 miles Northwest of Andrade, California, by All-American Canal, Alamo Canal the Colorado River and California State Route 186.

History
- Built: 1967

California Historical Landmark
- Reference no.: 939.4

California Historical Landmark number 939.4, Charley's World of Lost Art is in Andrade, California. California Historical Landmark is part of the Twentieth Century Folk Art Environments collection. Built by Charles Kasling (1901-1985). Kasling had started creating art sculptures in 1959 and they cover about two 1/2 half acres. Kasling was inspired by both his travels with the U.S. Navy and his desert travels. He also built art in Death Valley. The sculptures no longer remain.

California Historical Landmark reads:

NO. 939 Twentieth Century Folk Art Environments (Thematic) -CHARLEY'S WORLD OF LOST ART - Charles Kasling began sculpturing near Andrade in 1967, and his creations now fill a site of approximately two and a half acres. His style, best described as eclectic, was inspired partly by his world travels with the U.S. Navy and partly by the desert terrain.

== See also ==
- California Historical Landmarks in Imperial County
- Imperial County
- Imperial Valley
- Calexico–Mexicali
