= Raúl Ureña =

American politician

Raúl Ureña (born c. 1997) is an American politician and activist.

As a member of the City Council of Calexico, California, she (Note: Ureña uses all pronouns, but prefers she/her. This article uses she/her for consistency.) served from 2023 to 2024 as the city's mayor, becoming the first transgender person to hold the seat. In April 2024, she was recalled from the council in a special election.

== Early life and education ==
Born around 1997, Raúl Ureña grew up in Calexico, California, a city near the U.S.-Mexican border, as well as in Salinas to the north. She came from a family of Mexican American farmworkers.

Ureña studied economics at University of California, Santa Cruz, graduating in 2020. She pursued further studies in statistics at San Diego State University, then graduated in 2026 with a master's degree from the Economics Department at UC Santa Cruz.

== Political career ==
Ureña is an activist for progressive causes and the rights of farmworkers, having first become politically active as a high school student speaking at local school board meetings.

In 2020, Ureña, then a college student, returned to her hometown due to the COVID-19 pandemic. She was inspired to run for local office there after seeing the effects the pandemic had on the area's farmworkers. Later that year, at 23 years old, she was elected to an open seat on the Calexico City Council with 70% of the vote.

Ureña was re-elected to a full term in an at-large seat on the council in 2022. Shortly after her election, she came out as gender fluid and transgender, which was met with significant harassment from some of the city's residents. The following year, she became the town's mayor, as the honorary title rotates among members of the council. In doing so, she became the city's first transgender mayor, and the first trans and Latina mayor of any city in California or across the border region. She spent eight months as mayor, passing the title on in early 2024.

However, early in Ureña's mayoral term, critics mounted a recall campaign against her. While her opponents characterized the recall effort as a rejection of her political priorities, Ureña and her allies assessed it as a reaction to her gender identity. In April 2024, she lost her council seat by a vote of 74% in a recall special election, which also ousted her closest ally on the council, Gilberto Manzanarez.
