= The PickUp =

Shuttle bus service in West Hollywood, California, US

- Parent: City of West Hollywood
- Founded: 2013
- Headquarters: 8300 Santa Monica Boulevard
- Locale: West Hollywood, California
- Service type: Shuttle bus
- Routes: 1
- Fleet: 2
- Daily ridership: 575 (2018)
- Operator: American GTS
- Website: www.wehopickup.com

The PickUp is a free weekend-only nighttime shuttle bus service operating a single route along Santa Monica Boulevard in West Hollywood, California. First launched in 2013, it primarily serves passengers patronizing bars, clubs and other entertainment venues located along the Santa Monica corridor.

== History ==
The PickUp was soft launched on August 9, 2013, with service formally commencing the following weekend. It was West Hollywood's second attempt at a running a nighttime shuttle bus service; the first attempt, which ran during the 1990s, failed due to low ridership.

Initially running along Santa Monica Boulevard between Robertson Boulevard and Fairfax Avenue as a trial service that would last until the end of the year, the city government of West Hollywood allocated $71,000 for the project, pitching it as a "flirtatious take on public transit". Ridership averaged between 1,300 and 1,400 riders per weekend in its first month, with ridership higher on Saturdays than Fridays, and averaging around 1,200 riders per weekend in its first year.

Owing to strong positive reception from riders, residents and businesses, in January 2014 the West Hollywood City Council voted to continue the service, and the following year it approved expanding The PickUp to its current service pattern, introducing limited Sunday and holiday service as well as extending the route to the eastern end of West Hollywood city limits. Permanent year-round Sunday service was subsequently introduced on October 2, 2016. Two years later, West Hollywood introduced a similar service along Sunset Boulevard, the Sunset Trip, alluding to its route along the Sunset Strip.

On April 1, 2020, the city government of West Hollywood announced that services on The PickUp would be suspended indefinitely owing to the COVID-19 pandemic in California. Service resumed on October 8, 2021, with passengers required to wear face masks and buses limited to fifty percent of maximum capacity to promote social distancing. Sunset Trip service, on the other hand, was not resumed due to budget cuts resulting from the pandemic, but may return in the future depending on funding and demand.

On July 1, 2025, the City of West Hollywood announced a temporary service interruption of The PickUp as it was set to select a new vendor to operate the service. Service was later restored on October 9, 2025.

== Operations and service pattern ==
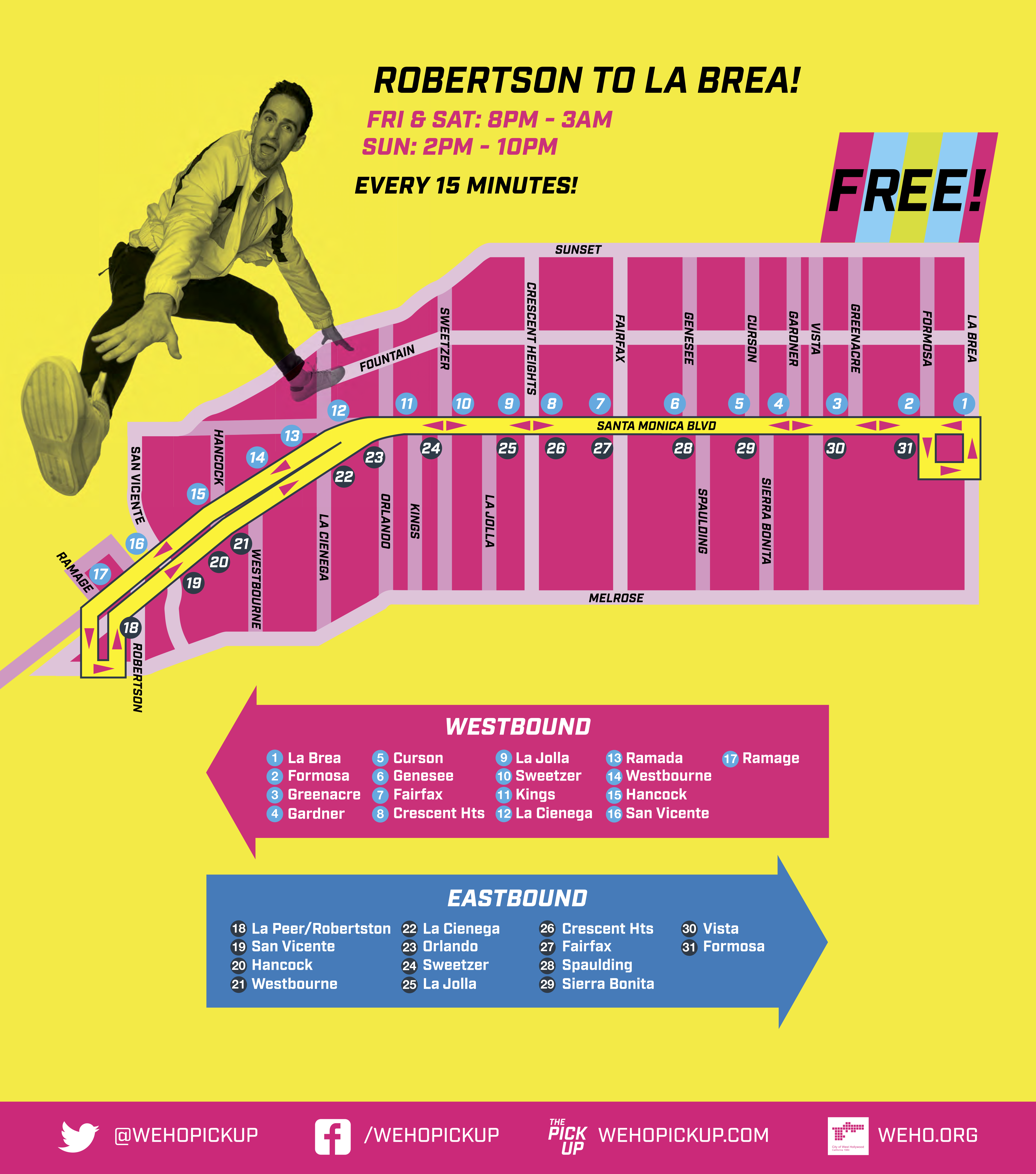
Service map of The PickUp as of October 8, 2021, showing the service's route and schedule

The PickUp runs a single west-east route along Santa Monica Boulevard, starting at the intersection of Santa Monica Boulevard and La Brea Avenue. It then runs west, serving stops on the northern side of Santa Monica Boulevard until the last westbound stop on Ramage Street, where it then turns onto Almont Drive and Melrose Avenue before turning onto La Peer Drive and back again onto Santa Monica Boulevard where, traveling eastward, it then serves stops on the southern side. Buses run every 15 minutes from 8:00 pm to 3:00 am on Fridays and Saturdays, and from 2:00 pm to 10:00 pm on Sundays, complementing existing Los Angeles Metro Bus service and giving riders additional transportation options.

Stops are identified with bright yellow signs, and are often located in front of bars, clubs and other entertainment venues. A number of prominent West Hollywood establishments are served with PickUp stops; these include Barney's Beanery, served by the stop at Santa Monica and Kings Road; Tail o' the Pup, served by the stop at Santa Monica and La Cienega Boulevard; Circus of Books, served by the stop at Santa Monica and La Jolla Avenue; and the Pacific Design Center, served by the stop at Santa Monica and San Vicente Boulevard.

=== Fleet ===
The PickUp operates trolley-shaped buses. Buses are painted bright yellow, with pop art design elements reminiscent of the 1960s being part of the buses' design.

Until June 2025, The PickUp operated with buses manufactured by Freightliner Trucks which can sit up to 29 passengers at any one time, although the buses are certified for a maximum capacity of 35 passengers along with one space for a wheelchair. These buses were operated by transport operator American GTS on behalf of the City of West Hollywood, and were equipped with wooden benches, a photo booth called "The PickUp Shot" which could upload photos to social media, and a jar of complimentary condoms located by the driver's seat. Music curated by local DJ Derek Monteiro, described as being either house or ambient trance, was also played in the background for passengers.

After American GTS opted not to renew their contract, on August 18, 2025, the city government announced that it would sign a new contract with MV Transportation, which already operates West Hollywood's Cityline and dial-a-ride services, to operate The PickUp on an interim basis through June 2026 using a new fleet of three city-owned buses manufactured by Specialty Vehicles.

=== Fares ===
Passengers may ride The PickUp free of charge, with the cost absorbed by the City of West Hollywood, although the city government has considered using corporate sponsorships to ensure continued funding for the service. In 2018, a passenger trip cost the city government around $6.50.

Aside from subsidizing fares, to help promote ridership a number of businesses along Santa Monica Boulevard offer discounts and other benefits for riders, including VIP entry, free food and discounts on drinks.

== Reception and accolades ==
Public reception to The PickUp has been generally positive, with 93% of passengers reporting they were either satisfied or very satisfied with the service according to a 2018 city-commissioned survey of riders.

The city government of West Hollywood has been awarded a number of times for marketing campaigns related to The PickUp. In April 2014, the city was given the Excellence in Communications Award by the California Association of Public Information Officials for its marketing efforts in launching the service, and later that year the Los Angeles chapter of the Public Relations Society of America likewise awarded it the PRism Award of Excellence for its fresh approach to promoting public transit.

== See also ==
- Santa Monica Boulevard
- List of Southern California transit agencies
