= Calexico, California =

City in California, United States

- City
- City of Calexico
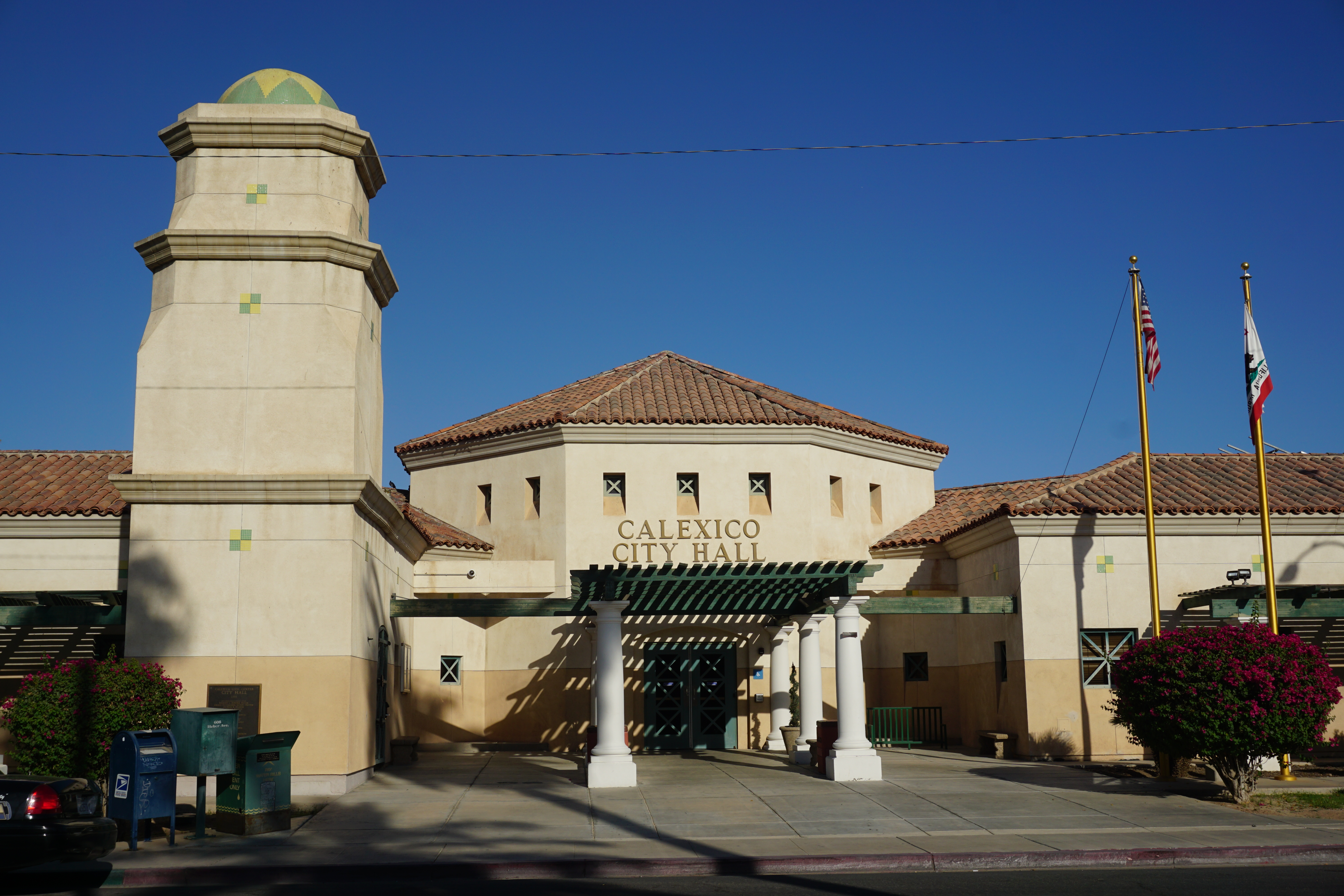
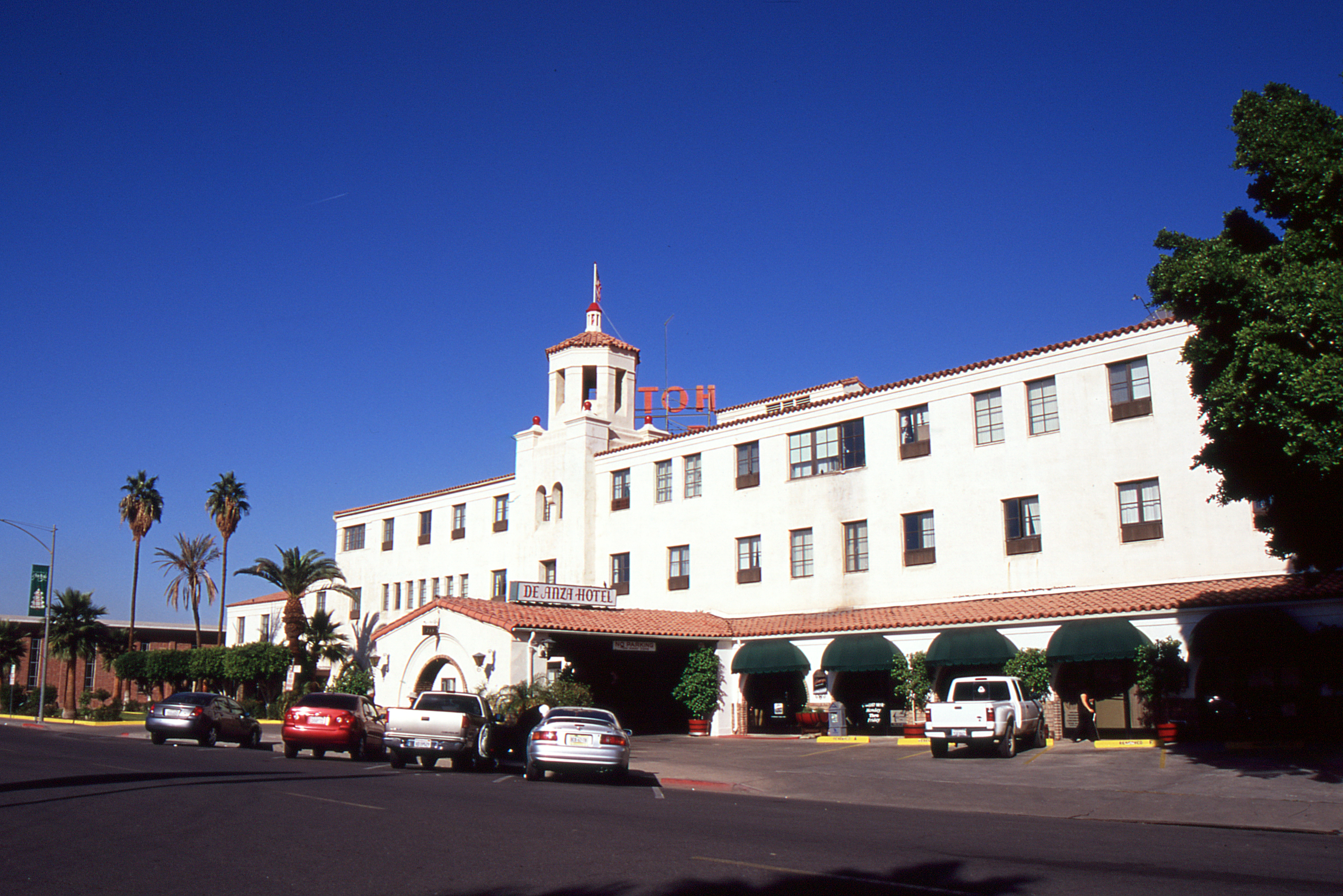
- Top: City Hall; Bottom: Hotel de Anza

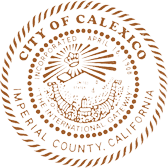
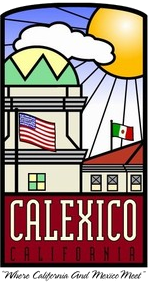
- Seal Logo
- Nicknames: The International Gateway City; Where California and Mexico Meet
- Interactive map of Calexico, California
- Location within California Location within the United States
- Coordinates: 32°40′44″N 115°29′56″W
- Country: United States
- State: California
- County: Imperial
- Incorporated: April 16, 1908

Government
  - Type: Council–manager government
  - Mayor: Victor Legaspi

Area
  - Total: 8.62 sq mi (22.32 km^{2})
  - Land: 8.62 sq mi (22.32 km^{2})
  - Water: 0 sq mi (0.00 km^{2}) 0%
- Elevation: 3 ft (0.91 m)

Population (2020)
  - Total: 38,633
  - Density: 4,482.1/sq mi (1,730.53/km^{2})
- Time zone: UTC−08:00 (PST)
  - Summer (DST): UTC−07:00 (PDT)
- ZIP Codes: 92231–92232
- Area codes: 760/442
- FIPS code: 06-09710
- GNIS feature IDs: 1652680, 2409958
- Website: www.calexico.ca.gov

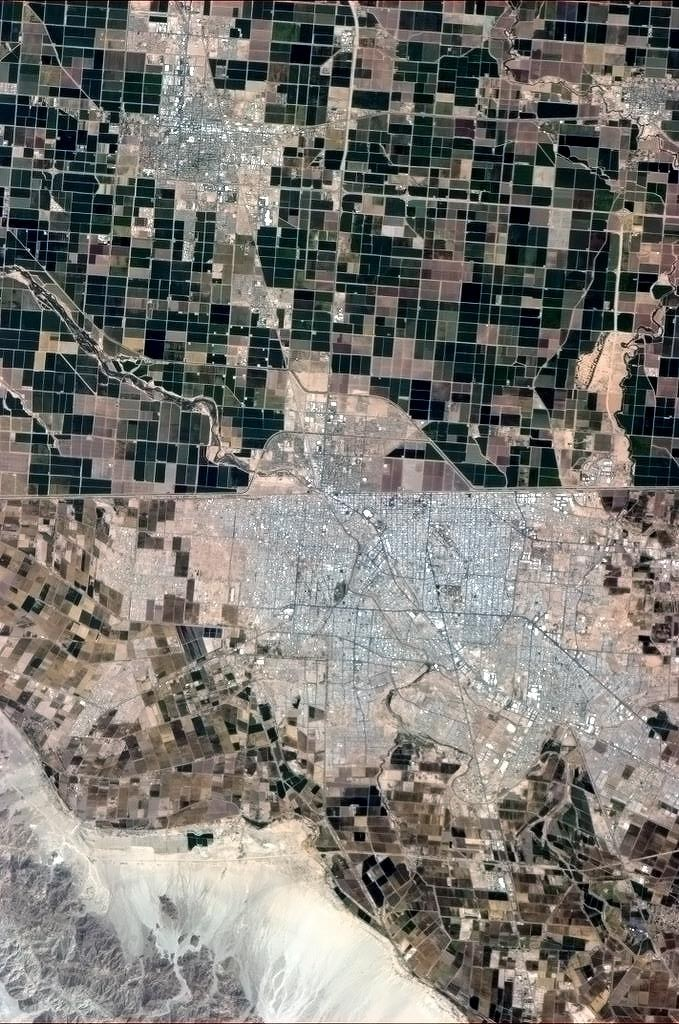
Calexico, seen from the International Space Station, is situated north of the Mexico–US border.

Calexico (/kəˈlɛksɪkoʊ/) is a city in southern Imperial County, California, United States. As of the 2020 census, Calexico had a population of 38,633. Situated on the Mexican border, it is linked economically with the much larger city of Mexicali, the capital of the Mexican state of Baja California. It is about 122 miles (196 km) east of San Diego and 62 miles (100 km) west of Yuma, Arizona. Calexico, along with six other incorporated Imperial County cities, forms part of the larger populated area known as the Imperial Valley. First explored by Europeans in the 18th century, Calexico began as a small tent community which was ultimately incorporated in 1908.

== Etymology ==
The name of the city is a portmanteau of California and Mexico. The originally proposed names were Santo Tomas or Thomasville. Mexicali is a similarly named city directly across the international border from Calexico, its name also a portmanteau but reversed of the words "Mexico" and "California".

== History ==
The expedition of Spanish explorer Juan Bautista de Anza traveled through the area some time between 1775 and 1776, during Spanish rule. The trail through Calexico was designated as a historical route by the State of California.

=== Founding ===
Calexico began as a tent city of the Imperial Land Company; it was founded in 1899, and incorporated in 1908. The Imperial Land Company converted desert land into a fertile setting for year-round agriculture. The first post office in Calexico opened in 1902.

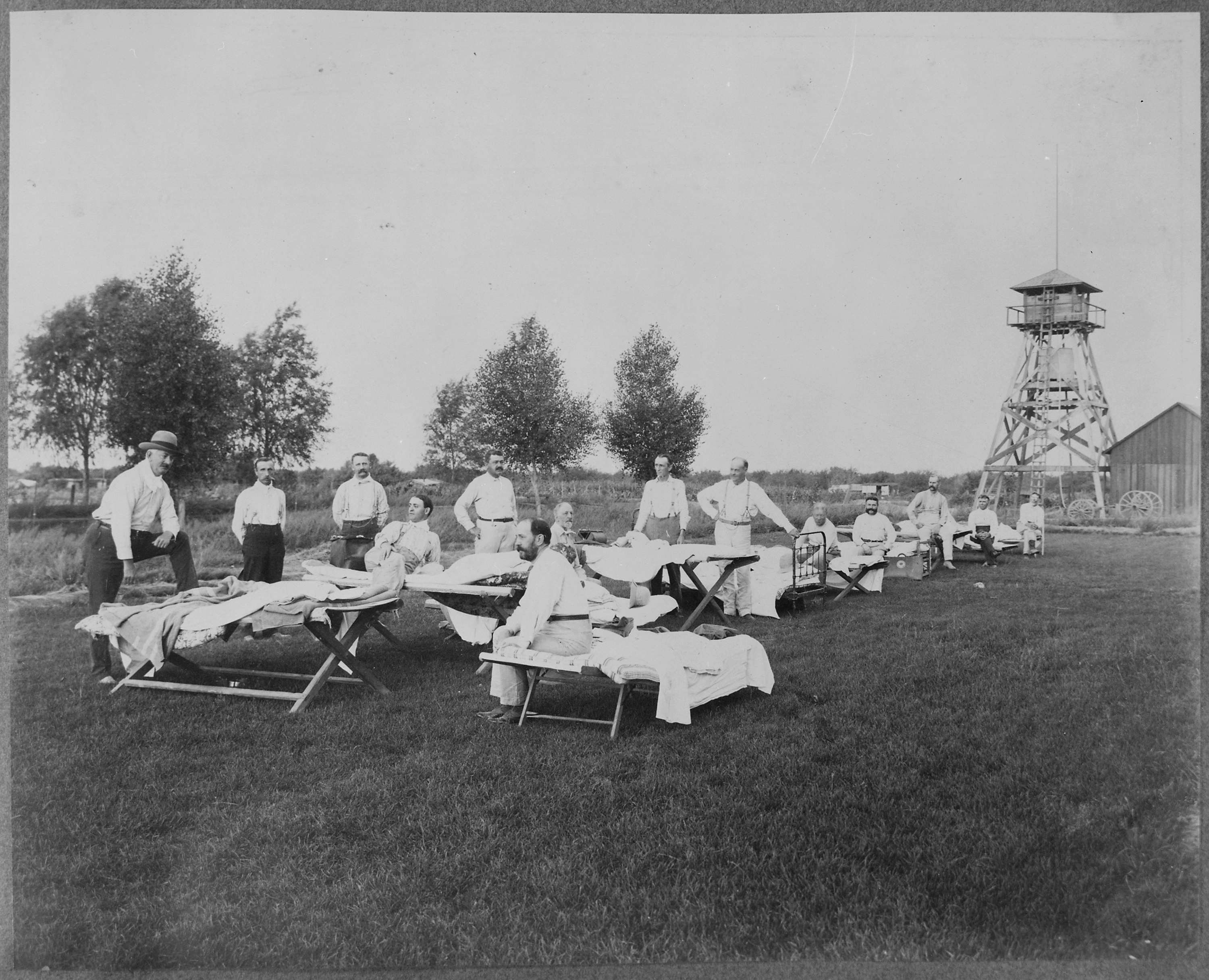
Bankers and the Railroad Men's Party in early Calexico

=== 2010 earthquake ===
On April 4, 2010, the El Mayor earthquake caused moderate to heavy damage throughout Calexico and across the border in Mexicali. Measuring 7.2 M_{w}, the quake was centered about 40 miles (64 km) south of the U.S.–Mexico border near Mexicali. A state of emergency was declared and officials cordoned off First and Second streets between Paulin and Heber Avenues. Glass and debris littered the streets of downtown Calexico and two buildings partially collapsed. The Calexico water treatment plant sustained severe damage.

== Geography ==
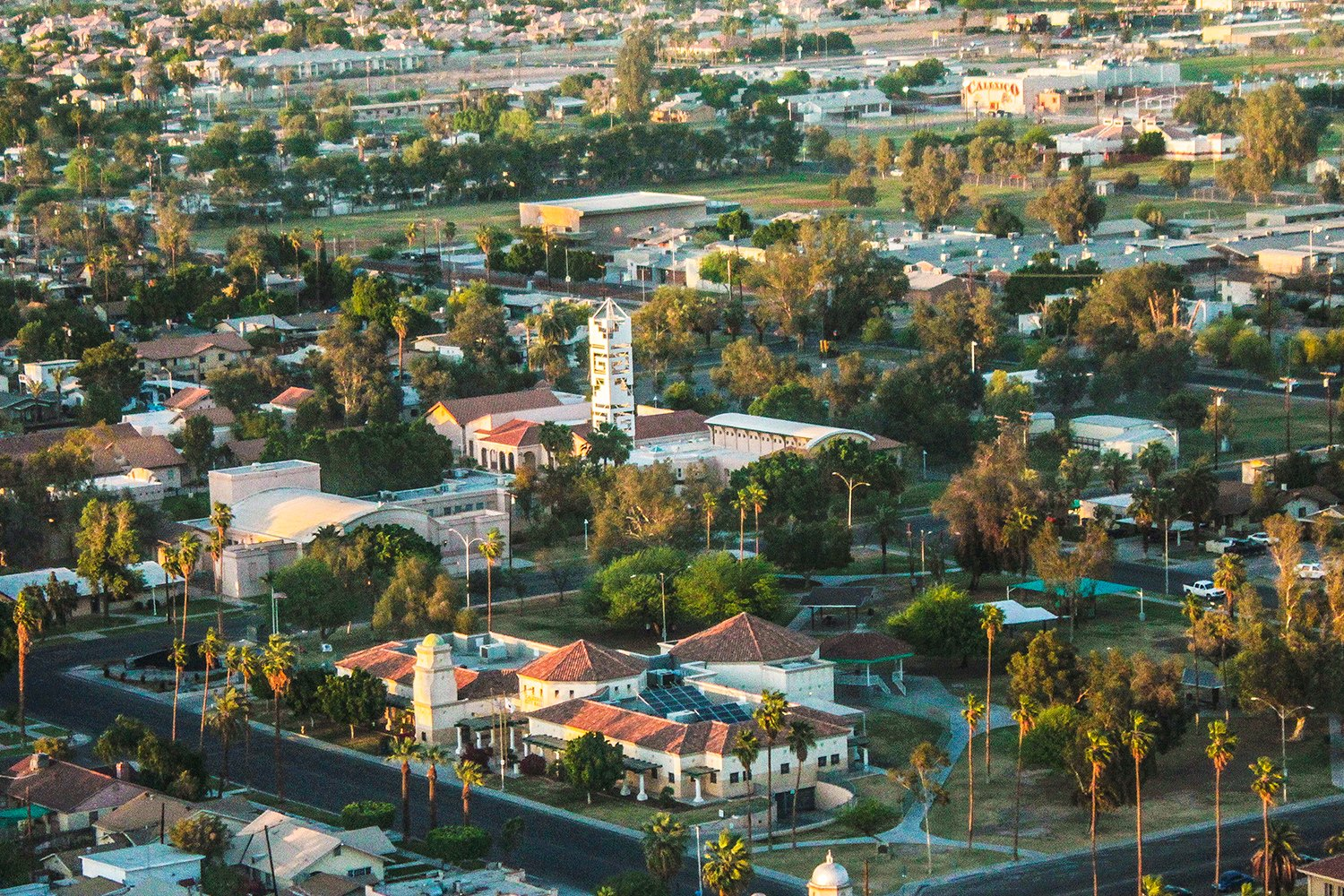
Calexico City hall and SDSU-Imperial Valley Campus Aerial

According to the United States Census Bureau, at the 2020 census, the city had a total area of 8.6 square miles (22 km^{2}), all land. Calexico is located 230 miles (370 km) southeast of Los Angeles, 125 miles (201 km) east of San Diego, 260 miles (420 km) west of Phoenix, and adjacent to Mexicali, Baja California, Mexico. Calexico's location provides easy overnight trucking access to all those transportation hubs plus the ports of Long Beach, California, and Ensenada, Baja California, Mexico. Calexico is served by State Routes 98, 7 and 111, with direct connection to Interstate 8 (5 miles north) and State Route 86. There are eighteen regular and irregular common carriers for intrastate and interstate truck service to Calexico.

Rail service is provided by Union Pacific Railroad, and connects with the main line to Portland, Oregon; Rock Island, Illinois; Tucumcari, New Mexico; St. Louis, Missouri; and New Orleans, Louisiana. Within city limits is Calexico International Airport, the U.S. Customs and Border Protection checkpoint for private passenger and air-cargo flights entering the U.S. from Mexico. Private charter services are also available there. General aviation facilities and scheduled passenger and air-cargo service to San Diego International Airport, Bob Hope Airport in Burbank, and other points are available at Imperial County Airport (Boley Field), located 17 miles (27 km) north.

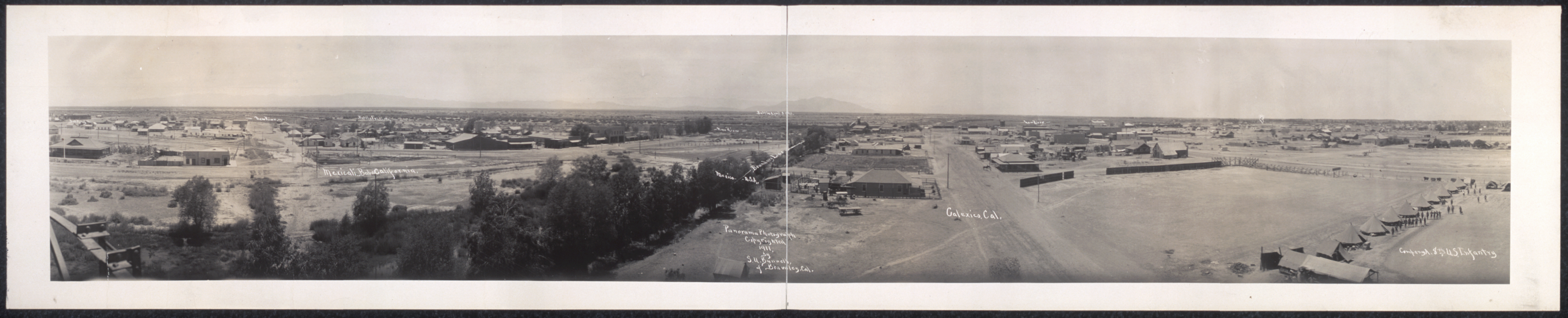
Bird's-eye view of Calexico during the early 20th century

=== Climate ===
Calexico has a subtropical hot-desert climate (BWh), according to the Köppen climate classification system. In December 1932, the city experienced a rare snowfall. Rainfall usually occurs in the winter months of December, January and February. Although summer is extremely dry in Calexico, there are occasional thunderstorms. In 2008, during the months of July and August there were several heavy thunderstorms that let down large amounts of rain and hail. Summer rainfall in the city is infrequent. During wintertime, Calexico is sometimes affected by winter rain showers. The summer temperatures in Calexico are very hot, with most of those days having temperatures at or above 100 °F (38 °C). However, the hot desert climate seen in Calexico is actually not unusual for similar parallel cities such as, for example, Baghdad, Iraq. The area has a large amount of sunshine year-round due to its stable descending air and high pressure.

Climate data for Calexico, California
Month	Jan	Feb	Mar	Apr	May	Jun	Jul	Aug	Sep	Oct	Nov	Dec	Year
Record high °F (°C)	90 (32)	93 (34)	101 (38)	109 (43)	116 (47)	121 (49)	122 (50)	120 (49)	120 (49)	112 (44)	98 (37)	95 (35)	122 (50)
Mean daily maximum °F (°C)	70 (21)	75 (24)	79 (26)	86 (30)	94 (34)	103 (39)	107 (42)	106 (41)	101 (38)	91 (33)	78 (26)	70 (21)	88 (31)
Mean daily minimum °F (°C)	41 (5)	45 (7)	49 (9)	54 (12)	61 (16)	68 (20)	76 (24)	77 (25)	71 (22)	59 (15)	47 (8)	41 (5)	57 (14)
Record low °F (°C)	18 (−8)	24 (−4)	29 (−2)	34 (1)	36 (2)	47 (8)	52 (11)	54 (12)	48 (9)	33 (1)	24 (−4)	22 (−6)	18 (−8)
Average precipitation inches (mm)	0.51 (13)	0.36 (9.1)	0.31 (7.9)	0.05 (1.3)	0.03 (0.76)	0.01 (0.25)	0.06 (1.5)	0.32 (8.1)	0.36 (9.1)	0.35 (8.9)	0.17 (4.3)	0.43 (11)	2.96 (75.21)

== Demographics ==
Historical population
Census	Pop.	Note	%±
1910	797		—
1920	6,223		680.8%
1930	6,299		1.2%
1940	5,415		−14.0%
1950	6,433		18.8%
1960	7,992		24.2%
1970	10,625		32.9%
1980	14,412		35.6%
1990	18,633		29.3%
2000	27,109		45.5%
2010	38,572		42.3%
2020	38,633		0.2%
U.S. Decennial Census

=== 2020 census ===
As of the 2020 census, Calexico had a population of 38,633. The population density was 4,482.3 inhabitants per square mile (1,730.6/km^{2}). The median age was 36.2 years. 25.7% of residents were under the age of 18, 10.3% were aged 18 to 24, 23.3% were aged 25 to 44, 24.7% were aged 45 to 64, and 15.9% were 65 years of age or older. For every 100 females there were 87.5 males, and for every 100 females age 18 and over there were 83.0 males age 18 and over.

The census reported that 99.7% of the population lived in households, 0.3% lived in non-institutionalized group quarters, and no one was institutionalized. 99.6% of residents lived in urban areas, while 0.4% lived in rural areas.

There were 10,468 households in Calexico, of which 47.2% had children under the age of 18 living in them. Of all households, 52.9% were married-couple households, 3.7% were cohabiting-couple households, 11.7% were households with a male householder and no spouse or partner present, and 31.7% were households with a female householder and no spouse or partner present. About 13.7% of all households were made up of individuals and 8.6% had someone living alone who was 65 years of age or older. The average household size was 3.68. There were 8,738 families (83.5% of all households).

There were 10,815 housing units at an average density of 1,254.8 units per square mile (484.5 units/km^{2}). Of all housing units, 96.8% were occupied and 3.2% were vacant. Of occupied units, 50.9% were owner-occupied and 49.1% were occupied by renters. The homeowner vacancy rate was 0.6% and the rental vacancy rate was 2.1%.

Racial composition as of the 2020 census
Race	Number	Percent
White	7,621	19.7%
Black or African American	91	0.2%
American Indian and Alaska Native	506	1.3%
Asian	437	1.1%
Native Hawaiian and Other Pacific Islander	19	0.0%
Some other race	17,527	45.4%
Two or more races	12,432	32.2%
Hispanic or Latino (of any race)	37,548	97.2%

=== 2023 ACS 5-year estimates ===
In 2023, the US Census Bureau estimated that the median household income was $50,021, and the per capita income was $20,185. About 17.7% of families and 21.0% of the population were below the poverty line.

== Government ==
The City of Calexico operates under a City Council/City Manager form of government. The City Council consists of five Council Members, elected to overlapping four-year term. The Mayor and Mayor Pro-Tem are chosen from among the five council members and rotate on an annual basis. The mayor presides at council meetings, where all official policies and laws of the city are enacted. The members of the Calexico City Council set policy and appoint commissions and committees that study the present and future needs of Calexico. The other two elected officials in the City of Calexico are the City Clerk and City Treasurer. Each of them is elected directly by the voters and serves a 4-year term. The Calexico branch of the Imperial County Superior Court system was officially renamed on Saturday, December 19, 1992, in honor of Legaspi family members Henry, Victor and Luis Legaspi as the Legaspi Municipal Court Complex.

=== Politics ===
In the state legislature, Calexico is in the 18th senatorial district, represented by Democrat Steve Padilla, and the 36th Assembly district, represented by Republican Jeff Gonzalez. Federally, Calexico is in California's 25th congressional district, represented by Democrat Raul Ruiz. The current mayor is Diana Nuricumbo. The mayor pro tem is Victor Legaspi, and the other council members are Lisa Tylenda, Adriana Marquez, and Lorenzo Calderon.

Calexico city vote by party in presidential elections
Year	Democratic	Republican	Third Parties
2024	57.32% 6,938	39.98% 4,839	2.69% 326
2020	71.51% 9,270	26.17% 3,392	2.31% 300
2016	86.30% 10,226	9.78% 1,159	3.92% 465
2012	85.73% 7,150	13.03% 1,087	1.24% 103
2008	82.68% 6,689	15.75% 1,274	1.57% 127
2004	73.38% 3,471	25.16% 1,190	1.46% 69
2000	75.25% 3,557	21.94% 1,037	2.81% 133
1996	84.91% 2,780	11.91% 390	3.18% 104
1992	62.82% 1,803	28.36% 814	8.82% 253
1988	71.54% 1,629	27.93% 636	0.53% 12
1984	60.53% 1,161	38.32% 735	1.15% 22
1980	64.26% 1,208	27.71% 521	8.03% 151
1976	66.75% 1,267	30.98% 588	2.27% 43
1972	57.45% 1,126	40.36% 791	2.19% 43
1968	56.04% 947	39.35% 665	4.62% 78
1964	67.35% 1,215	32.65% 589

In recent years, Calexico has overwhelmingly supported Democratic Party candidates for president. In eight of the last 10 presidential elections, the Democratic candidate has received over 70% of the vote, though the share has been declining since the 2016 peak of 86%, with Republican support growing from 10 to 40 percent by the 2024 election.

== Education ==
=== Colleges and universities ===
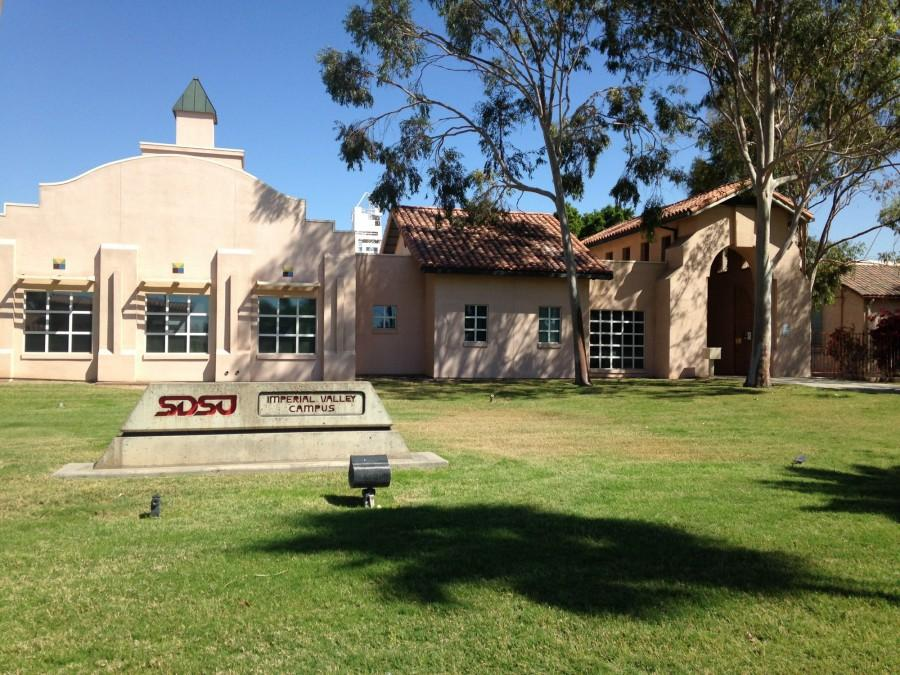
San Diego State's Imperial Valley Campus, located in Calexico

Post-secondary education is available at the Imperial Valley Campus of San Diego State University, and at Imperial Valley College (11 miles (18 km) to the north). In addition, there are more than 20 local agencies and programs providing vocational training which can be tailored to the specific needs of potential employers.

=== Public schools ===
The Calexico Unified School District serves city residents. Calexico has 7 elementary schools, 2 junior high schools and 2 high schools:

==== Elementary ====
Grades K–6

- Kennedy Gardens Elementary – Home of the Eagles
- Allen and Helen Mains Elementary – Home of the Trojans
- Rockwood Elementary – Home of the Rockets
- Blanche Charles Elementary – Home of the Dolphins
- Jefferson Elementary – Home of the Tigers
- Dool Elementary – Home of the Cougars
- Cesar Chavez Elementary – Home of the Lobos

==== Junior high schools ====
===== Grades 7–8 =====
- Willam Moreno Jr. High – Home of the Aztecs
- Enrique Camarena Junior High School – Home of the Firebirds

==== High schools ====
Grades 9–12

- Calexico High School 9th Campus - Home of the Bulldogs
- Calexico High School – Home of the Bulldogs (10th-12th)
- Aurora High School – Home of the Eagles

=== Public charter school (Independent Study) ===
RAI Online Charter School—raicharter.net (K–12, tuition-free)

==== Adult education schools ====
- Robert F. Morales Adult Education Center
- Independent Studies Office

=== Private schools ===
Calexico Mission School, a Seventh-day Adventist Academy operated by the Southeastern California Conference in Riverside, CA provides private religious education in Calexico from kindergarten through twelfth grade.

Our Lady of Guadalupe Academy (Home to the Bees), and Vincent Memorial Catholic High School (Home to the Scots), Roman Catholic schools operated by the Roman Catholic Diocese of San Diego, are also in Calexico.

== Infrastructure ==
=== Transportation ===
Calexico is served by the privately owned Calexico Transit, LA Shuttle and Numero Uno Shuttle and the publicly owned Imperial Valley Transit for local transit. Calexico is also served by Greyhound Lines.

Freight rail service is provided by Union Pacific Railroad's Calexico Subdivision.

=== Utilities ===
Calexico's public works departments operates water and sewer service for the city.

== Community ==
Calexico generally identifies as part of the larger Imperial Valley region, which includes the El Centro metropolitan area, as do the rest of the cities in the county.

Notable sites

- Hotel De Anza - Hotel establishment notable for its history and having served celebrities and public figures.
- Calexico Carnegie Library - Carnegie library built in 1918 and added to the National Register of Historic Places in 2005
- US Inspection Station – Calexico - Historically used as the original port of entry during the early 20th century – was closed and added to the National Register of Historic Places in 1992.
- Camp Salvation - Refugee camp established in 1849 by Lieut. Cave for emigrants coming from the Southern Emigrant Trail during the California Gold Rush – was registered as a California Historical Landmarks site in 1965.
- Camp John H. Beacom – A semipermanent camp named after Colonel John H. Beacom (6th infantry) garrisoned in Calexico during World War I for patrolling duties. The site was abandoned in 1920 according to cavalry journals.
- Camp Calexico was another post used for patrolling duties by Colonel W. G. Schreibe and his infantry in 1914.
- Mount Signal Solar / One of the largest PV solar farms in the world.

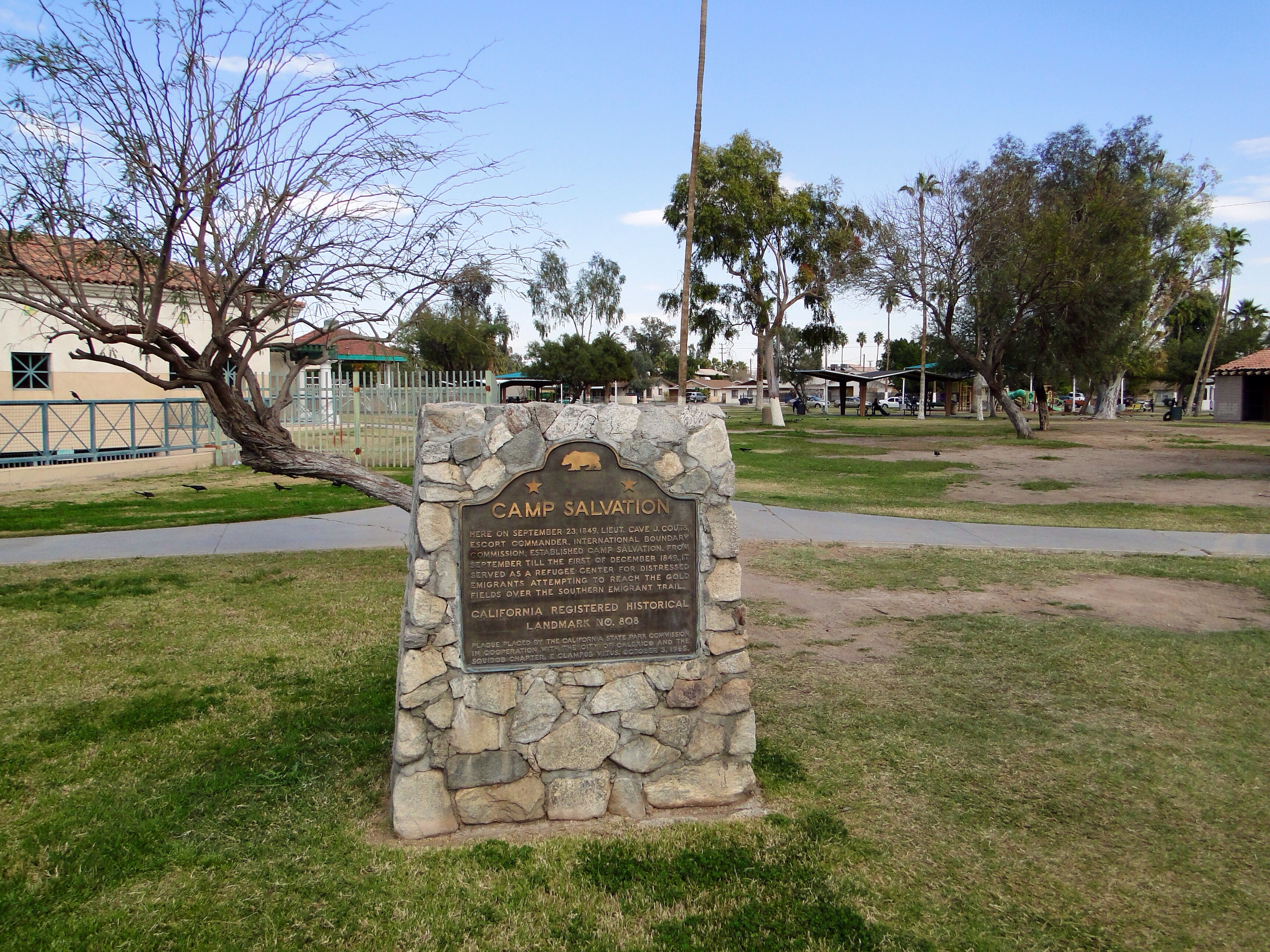
Camp Salvation, Calexico

Red Ribbon Week

Red Ribbon Week, a national observance dedicated to spreading awareness about the prevention of drugs and violence (especially in schools) originated within the city of Calexico during the mid to late 1980s as a tribute to DEA officer Enrique "Kiki" Camarena. Red Ribbon Week campaigns were championed by Nancy Reagan.

== Sister city ==
Calexico only has one sister city, that being Mexicali, Mexico. They have been sisters since April 28, 2017.

== Media ==
Media available in Calexico include national public television stations, county-wide radio stations (some of which feature nationwide or California statewide programming), and county-wide print publications such as the Imperial Valley Press as well as a few locally managed general interest publications.

== Notable people ==
- Isaac Acuña (b. 1989) – soccer player
- Bill Binder (1915–2010) – restaurateur, businessman, and owner of Philippe's
- Kiki Camarena (1947–1985) – Drug Enforcement Administration agent
- Enrique Castillo (b. 1949) – actor, writer, director, and producer
- Jeff Cravath (1903–1953) – college football player and coach
- Mariano-Florentino Cuellar (b. 1972) – Supreme Court of California justice and president of Carnegie Endowment for International Peace
- Emilio Delgado (1940–2022) – actor
- Bob Huff (b. 1953) – California State Senate member
- William Kesling (1899–1983) – architect
- Takashi Kijima (1920–2011) – photographer
- Henry Lozano (b. 1948) – Deputy Assistant to George W. Bush and director of the USA Freedom Corps
- Dan Navarro (b. 1952) – singer, guitarist, and voice actor
- Ruben Niebla (b. 1971) – Major League Baseball (MLB) player and coach
- Allen Strange (1943–2008) – composer and writer
- Raúl Ureña (b. c. 1997) – former mayor of Calexico
- Danny Villanueva (1937–2015) – National Football League (NFL) player, co-founder of Univision, and general manager of Major League Soccer club LA Galaxy
- Primo Villanueva (b. 1931) – Canadian Football League player
- Eugenio E. Walther (1940–2023) – governor of Baja California
- Bob Wilson (1916–1999) – United States House of Representatives member for California

== See also ==
- Imperial County
- Imperial Valley
- Calexico–Mexicali
