= William Kesling =

American architect

- Born: 18 October 1899; Kansas City
- Died: 13 October 1983 (aged 83)
- Occupation: Architect
- Spouse: Ehrma Williams (m. 1926)

William Kesling (born Kessling; 18 October 1899 - 13 October 1983) was an American architect. Kesling's career was divided into two periods: a Los Angeles period spanning from 1934 to 1937, and a San Diego period spanning from 1939 to 1962. During the former period he designed primarily in the Streamline Moderne style, and during the latter in the International Style. Kesling is recognized as one California's most prolific practitioners of Streamline Moderne.

== Biography ==
William Kessling was born on 18 October 1899, to Adolph Kessling and Pauline Heissler, both German immigrants. Adolph Kessling (1854–1928) was born in Germany, had left home and moved to Russia at the age of 13, and eventually traveled to the United States, settling in Kansas City where he met and married Pauline Heissler. William Kessling was the fourth among five children. The Kesslings moved from Kansas City to Brenham, Texas, where they owned a ranch, slaughterhouse, and butcher shop. In 1911, Adolph and his eldest son left the family without notice. In 1916, however, Adolph contacted his family and informed them that he was living in Calexico, California, where he owned another cattle operation and invited the family to join him. Pauline, with the four children, moved to Calexico and began working with Adolph while maintaining a separate residence. In the 1920s Adolph again left the family to look for gold in the Mojave Desert. He died in 1928 after falling off of a precipice.

Following the First World War, William Kessling moved to Los Angeles and worked as a carpenter, eventually working his way up to superintendent within the Jarboe Construction Company. In the late 1920s, he changed the spelling of his last name to "Kesling" and in 1926 married Ehrma Williams (1903–1993). Around this time Kesling left his job with Jarboe and formed his own contracting company.

In the early part of 1934, Kesling founded his company Kesling Modern Structures and began designing affordable modern houses. His first project began that summer and was completed in 1935. For the next two years, Kesling remained extremely busy, designing and building an extensive body of houses for clients including Hollywood actor Wallace Beery. During this time Kesling designed and built one of the largest oeuvres of Streamline-Moderne houses by a single architect. Arguably his most iconic houses from this period were the Vanderpool Residence and Skinner Residence, located side-by-side on Easterly Terrace in Los Angeles's Silver Lake neighborhood. In November 1936, Kesling was arrested on fraud charges, and in March 1937 was sentenced to two years probation, during which time he was disallowed from working in the building business.

In 1939, after his probation was finished, Kesling moved to La Jolla to start his business over. Throughout the Second World War he designed pre-fabricated houses and by the late 1940s, was again designing privately commissioned houses. Perhaps his most iconic work from this period was a cliff-side house he designed for Walton McConnell. Photographs of the house taken by Julius Shulman were featured in a 1947 issue of Life.

In the early 1960s, Kesling had again gotten into financial trouble and in 1962, was forced to sell his business and assets. For the rest of his career, he worked odd handy-man jobs. Kesling died on 13 October 1983, five days short of his 84th birthday.

== Legacy ==
Kesling's work was largely unappreciated during his lifetime and forgotten after his retirement. In the 21st century, however, Kesling's buildings have gained a new-found popularity and widespread recognition. Kesling houses now command high sale prices and are desirable due to their historic and aesthetic importance. Among those who own Kesling works is actor Jay Huguley, who lives in Kesling's Wilson Residence. In 2021, the Estes House was listed for $2 million.

== Works ==
Name	City	Address	Year
Model Home	Los Angeles	1519 North Easterly Terrace	1935
Johnstone Residence	Los Angeles	3311 Lowry Road	1935
Hough Residence	Los Angeles	2808 West Effie Street	1935
Estes Residence	Los Angeles	3817 Broadlawn Drive	1936
Kesling Modern Structures Office	Los Angeles	7522 Girard Avenue	1936
Collins Residence	Los Angeles	1709 Silverwood Terrace	1936
Vanderpool Residence	Los Angeles	1536 North Easterly Terrace	1936
Vernon Residence	Los Angeles	11575 Otsego Street	1936
Wilson Residence	Los Angeles	1831 Fanning Street	1936
Kaplan Residence	Los Angeles	1827 Fanning Street	1936
Evans Triplex	Los Angeles	1615-1617 Rendell Place	1936
Dill Residence	Los Angeles	4437 Vista del Monte	1936
Beery Residence	Los Angeles	947 North Martel Avenue	1936
Beery Duplex	Los Angeles	756 Harper Avenue	1936
Skinner Residence	Los Angeles	1530 North Easterly Terrace	1936
Adams Residence	Los Angeles	3217 Fernwood Avenue	1937
Rivero Residence	West Hollywood	1347 Miller Drive	1937
Ulm Residence	Los Angeles	3606 Amesbury Road	1937
Kibbe Residence	Los Angeles	1495 Easterly Terrace	1937
Unknown	Pasadena	412 Glen Holly Drive	1937
Kaysor Residence	La Jolla		1942
King Residence	La Jolla	8208 Paseo Del Ocaso	1947
Gamson Residence	La Jolla		1947
Ingle Residence	La Jolla	5819 Beaumont Street	1947
McConnell Residence	La Jolla	1890 Spindrift Drive	1947
Jamar Dining Room	La Jolla	5786 La Jolla Boulevard	1948
Borrego Springs Desert Club	Borrego Springs	401 Tilting T Drive	1948
Borrego Springs Mercantile Building	Borrego Springs	665 Palm Canyon Drive	1948
