= Peter Kesling =

American orthodontist (1932–2022)

- Born: January 1, 1932; LaPorte, Indiana, U.S.
- Died: July 25, 2022 (aged 90); LaPorte, Indiana, U.S.
- Known for: Inventing the tip-edge bracket appliance
- Medical career
- Profession: Dentist
- Sub-specialties: Orthodontics

Peter C. Kesling (January 1, 1932 – July 25, 2022) was an American orthodontist known for the development of the tip-edge orthodontic appliance in 1986. He held over 50 patents related to orthodontic appliances.

== Life ==
Kesling was born in La Porte, Indiana, the son of Dr. Harold Kesling, who was also an orthodontist, and who invented the tooth positioner appliance.

After graduating from the orthodontic program in 1958, Kesling joined the orthodontic clinic run by his father and Dr. Robert A. Rocke.

For 40 years, Dr. Kesling was an Associate Clinical Professor of Orthodontics at Saint Louis University. He is also a diplomate of the American Board of Orthodontics.

He has co-authored two textbooks, including Orthodontic Theory and Technique.

Kesling has three sons, Adam, Andrew and Christopher Kesling, (also an orthodontist), who works at the same practice as his grandfather founded, Harold Kesling, the Kesling-Rocke Orthodontic Center in Westville, Indiana.

Kesling died on July 25, 2022, at the age of 90.

== TP Orthodontics ==
TP Orthodontics was founded by Peter's father Harold Kesling and his brother David Kesling. In 2006, Peter sold some of the company shares to his son Andrew Kesling.

== Tip-edge appliance ==
Kesling developed the tip-edge appliance in 1986. The brackets of this appliance are made by removing the diagonally opposed corners from Edward Angle's edgewise slot. This allows either mesial or distal tipping of a tooth. One can use small forces such as 2oz to 4oz to move teeth. The appliance is also sometimes referred to as "Kesling the slot".
