= Clean Air Express =

Bus service in Santa Barbara County, California, US

- Parent: Santa Barbara County Association of Governments
- Founded: 1991
- Headquarters: 260 North San Antonio Road
- Locale: Santa Barbara, California
- Service area: Santa Barbara County, California
- Service type: express bus service
- Routes: 4
- Fleet: 20 buses
- Fuel type: diesel, battery electric
- Operator: AmericanStar Trailways
- Website: Clean Air Express

The Clean Air Express provides commuter express bus service in portions of Santa Barbara County, California, with service between the cities of Santa Barbara, Lompoc, Santa Maria, and Goleta, California. In 1991, the service was formed to provide commuter service and to alleviate traffic congestion. The Clean Air Express is funded by Santa Barbara County Measure A funds.

== Routes ==
=== Commuter Express routes ===
Route	Terminals		Via	Notes
Lompoc – Goleta	Lompoc Lompoc Transit Hub	Santa Barbara Calle Real & Pesetas Ln	SR 1, SR 101, Hollister Av	3 trips in each direction
Lompoc – Santa Barbara	Lompoc Lompoc Transit Hub	Santa Barbara Gutierrez St & Nopal St	SR 1, SR 101	2 trips in each direction
Santa Maria/Buellton – Goleta	Santa Maria Santa Maria Park & Ride	Santa Barbara Calle Real & Pesetas Ln	SR 101	3 trips in each direction
Santa Maria/Buellton – Santa Barbara	Santa Maria Santa Maria Park & Ride	Santa Barbara Gutierrez St & Nopal St	SR 101	2 trips in each direction
