= Harold Kesling =

American orthodontist

Harold Dean Kesling
- Born: April 8, 1901; Cass County, Indiana
- Education: Loyola University Dental School
- Known for: Developed Positioner Appliance, Founding member of Orthodontic Company TP Orthodontics
- Medical career
- Profession: Dentist
- Sub-specialties: orthodontics

Harold Dean Kesling (April 8, 1901 – 1979) was an American orthodontist who is known for developing the tooth positioning appliance called "Positioner". This appliance is used in orthodontics at the end of treatment to allow teeth to settle in occlusion.

In 1945, H.D. Kesling stated that “Major tooth movements could be accomplished with a series of Positioners by changing the teeth on the setup slightly as treatment progresses." The history of clear aligner therapy began when H.D. Kesling pioneered the concept of straightening teeth without braces with the invention of the "Positioner."

H.D. Kesling founded orthodontic company TP Orthodontics, Inc. in 1959.

In the late 1970s, Kesling developed the Yare, an egg-shaped electric car at a cost of $40,000 for development.

== Life ==
He was born in Cass County, Indiana in 1901. He graduated from Loyola University Chicago in 1923 with his dental degree. He then opened his private practice in La Porte, Indiana. In 1929, he opened his orthodontic practice in Hammond, Indiana after receiving his orthodontic degree from Loyola University. Kesling's son, Peter Kesling, developed the Tip Edge appliance.

== Orthodontics ==
Kesling is known for developing the Positioner appliance. He developed this appliance during his work in the La Porte office in Indiana. His developed technique attracted many other orthodontists to his practice and Kesling gave many seminars in 1950s regarding this appliance.

Kesling was influenced by the work of Raymond Begg and his light wire technique. He switched his treatment to the Begg technique after he traveled to Australia and learned about the technique. For next 40 years, Kesling would go on to use this method in his practice. Kesling eventually gave seminars and lectures on the Begg technique.

== Awards and positions ==
- Honorary President of North American Begg Society of Orthodontists
