= California State Route 186 =

Highway in California

State Route 186
- Algodones Road
- SR 186 highlighted in red

Route information
- Maintained by Caltrans
- Length: 2.070 mi (3.331 km)
- Existed: 1972–present

Major junctions
- South end: Mexican border near Algodones
- North end: I-8 near Winterhaven

Location
- Country: United States
- State: California
- Counties: Imperial

Highway system
- State highways in California; Interstate; US; State; Scenic; History; Pre‑1964; Unconstructed; Deleted; Freeways
| ← SR 185 | → SR 187 |

State Route 186 (SR 186), also known as Algodones Road, is a state highway in the U.S. state of California that connects Interstate 8 (I-8) in Imperial County with the U.S.–Mexico border near the Colorado River. Its southern terminus is at the Andrade Port of Entry, which connects it to Los Algodones, Baja California, and its northern terminus is near Winterhaven, California, in the location of Araz Junction. The route is only 2.070 miles (3.331 km) long, heading along the length of the Alamo Canal and the All-American Canal within the boundaries of the Fort Yuma-Quechan Reservation. The route was assigned in 1972 in Imperial County, and the interchange with I-8 was constructed a year later.

== Route description ==
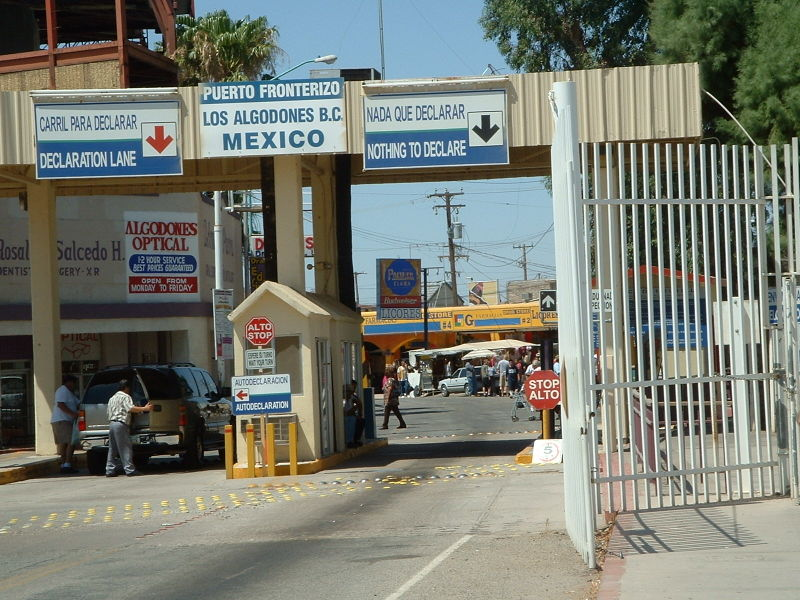
Border crossing into Los Algodones from Andrade, California, at the southern end of SR 186

Route 186 is defined in section 486 of the California Streets and Highways Code, and that the highway is "from the international boundary near Algodones to Route 8".

SR 186 begins at the United States–Mexico border (near Avenue International) in the community of Los Algodones. The route heads to the northeast along the Alamo Canal and crosses the center of the Fort Yuma-Quechan Reservation. Most of the surroundings of SR 186 are desolate, compared to the developed region across the border in Mexico. The highway continues northward, crossing the All-American Canal, where it turns to the north. SR 186 continues northward to an interchange with I-8 in Araz Junction, where the route terminates at the northbound ramps. The route continues northward as locally maintained Araz Road. Near the interchange is a casino operated by the Quechan Native American tribe that opened in 2009.

SR 186 is part of the National Highway System, a network of highways that are considered essential to the country's economy, defense, and mobility by the Federal Highway Administration. In 2014, SR 186 had an annual average daily traffic (AADT) of 3,800 vehicles at the southern end, and 8,200 vehicles at the junction with I-8, the latter of which was the highest AADT for the highway.

== History ==
A road south from the Ocean-to-Ocean Highway to the Mexican border just west of the Colorado River existed by 1917 and was paved between 1956 and 1965. The Andrade Port of Entry at the southern end of the highway was built in 1970. The current alignment of SR 186 was assigned in 1972 by the California State Legislature.

There are two bridges along the alignment of SR 186. The first one to be constructed was a concrete slab bridge over the All-American Canal, which opened in 1938. The bridge is 140.09 feet (42.70 m) long and is considered unable to sustain the traffic it was designed to handle. The second bridge is located at the interchange with I-8 in Araz Junction. This bridge, constructed in 1973 (a year after the route was assigned), is a 227.03-foot-long (69.20 m) concrete box beam structure. This structure, unlike the other, is recorded as being in usable shape.

== Major intersections ==
The entire route is in Imperial County.

| Location | mi | km | Destinations | Notes |
|---|---|---|---|---|
| | 0.00 | 0.00 | Mexico–United States border (Andrade Port of Entry) | Continues beyond the international border as Calle 2 |
| Araz Junction | 2.07 | 3.33 | I-8 | Northern terminus; exit 166 on I-8 |
| Araz Junction | 2.07 | 3.33 | CR S24 (Araz Road) | Continuation beyond I-8; Araz Road is the former US 80 |
1.000 mi = 1.609 km; 1.000 km = 0.621 mi
