= City of Lompoc Transit =

- Parent: City of Lompoc
- Headquarters: 1300 West Laurel Avenue
- Locale: Lompoc, California
- Service type: bus service, paratransit
- Routes: 6
- Fleet: 11 buses
- Operator: RATP Dev
- Website: City of Lompoc Transit

City of Lompoc Transit, known as COLT, is primary provider of mass transportation in Lompoc, Mission Hills, and Vandenberg Village, California. Six local routes are provided, plus one interurban line to Solvang, California and a twice-weekly shuttle to Santa Barbara.

== Routes ==
=== Fixed-Route ===
Route	Terminals		Via	Notes
1	Lompoc Lompoc Transit Hub		A St, Cabrillo Hwy	Clockwise route
2	Lompoc Lompoc Transit Hub		O St, V St	Counter-clockwise route
3	Lompoc Lompoc Transit Hub		Pine St	Loop route
4	Lompoc Mission Plaza		Burton Mesa Bl, SR 1	Serves Allan Hancock College; Loop route
Wine County Express	Lompoc Lompoc Transit Hub	Solvang Solvang Park	SR 246	Express route
Santa Barbara Shuttle	Lompoc Lompoc Transit Hub	Santa Barbara Santa Barbara Transit Center	SR 246, SR101	Shuttle route

== Bus fleet ==
=== Active fleet ===
Make/Model	Fleet numbers	Thumbnail	Year	Engine	Transmission	Notes
ENC Aero Elite	193-194		2012			
Glaval Titan II	11171-11175, 12171-12172		2017			
Glaval Titan II	19091		2019			
Ford Transit	19105		2019			
