= Andrade Port of Entry =

Border crossing between California, United States and Baja California, Mexico

Andrade California Port of Entry
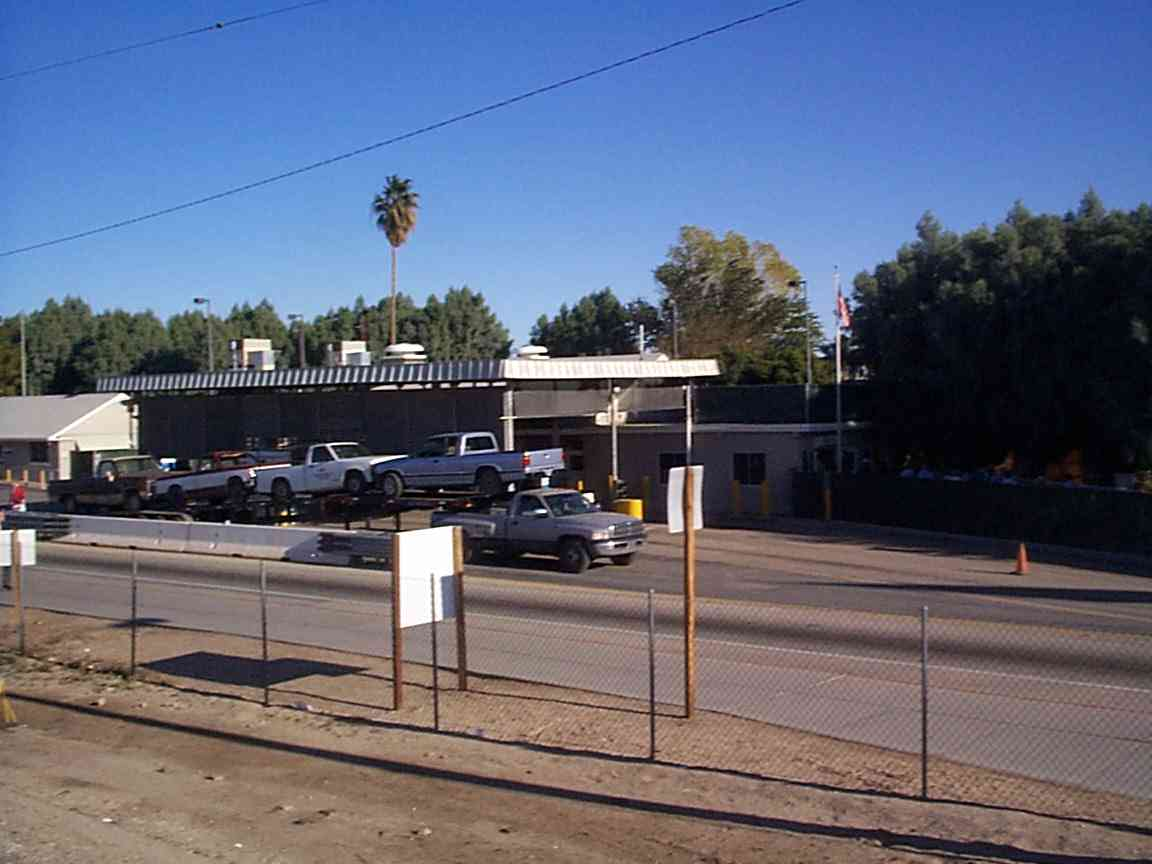
- Andrade Border Inspection Station

Location
- Country: United States
- Location: 235 Andrade Road, Winterhaven, California 92283
- Coordinates: 32.7187°N 114.7277°W

Details
- Opened: 1909

Statistics
- 2011 cars: 387,389
- 2011 trucks: 265
- Pedestrians: 832,608

Website
- http://www.cbp.gov/contact/ports/andrade-class

The Andrade Port of Entry is the easternmost and lowest volume border crossing of the United States-Mexico border in California, USA. It is located 2 miles south of Interstate 8 that it takes to El Centro (about 49 miles west) and to Yuma, Arizona (about 6 miles east), and about 2000 feet west of the Colorado River, in Imperial County opposite the Los Algodones border crossing in Baja California, Mexico. It is connected to Interstate 8 by California State Route 186. It is a minor port in comparison to the larger Calexico West and Calexico East Ports of Entry. In spite of its remote desert location, it supports significant tourist traffic volume. The Andrade-Los Algodones border crossing is also Mexico's northernmost port of entry. The port ranked 11th for pedestrian crossings in 2010, with more than one million people processed by U.S. Customs and Border Protection.

== History ==
The Andrade-Los Algodones border crossing as seen in 1911

This crossing was established in 1909, when the Southern Pacific Railroad constructed a branch that crossed the border at this location. Both the US and Mexico had Custom houses, primarily for the inspection of trains. A parallel road soon followed. By 1960, the railroad had been abandoned. In the 1990s, medical tourism grew significantly in Los Algodones, with numerous dentists and pharmacies establishing offices primarily for US customers, which contributes to the continued heavy pedestrian crossing numbers

== See also ==
- List of Mexico–United States border crossings
