= Yuma County Area Transit =

Public transportation system

Yuma County Area Transit (YCAT)

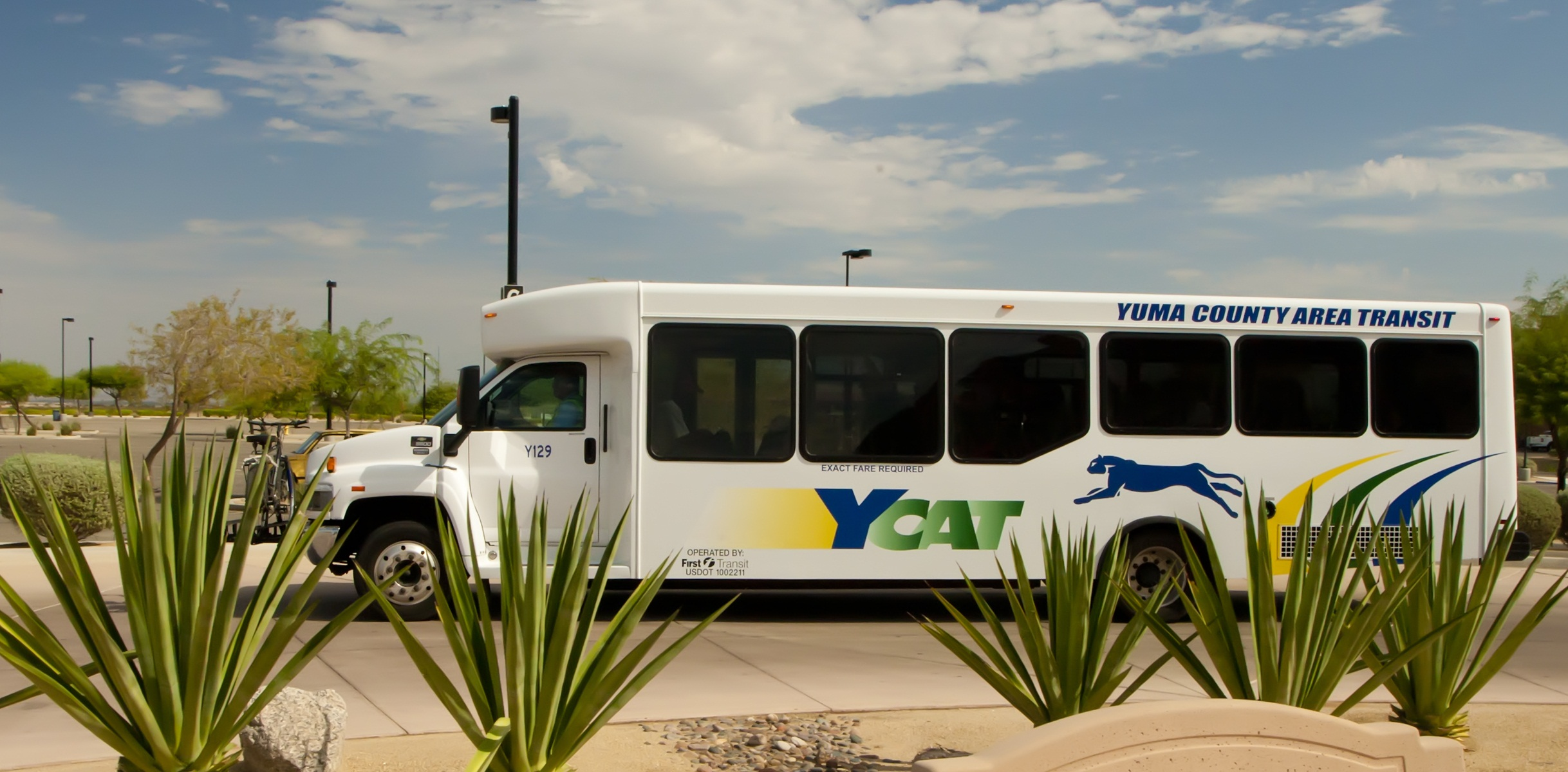
- Parent: Yuma County Intergovernmental Public Transportation Authority
- Founded: 1998
- Headquarters: 2715 E. 14th Street
- Locale: Yuma, Arizona
- Service area: Yuma County, Arizona; Imperial County, California
- Service type: Transit bus
- Routes: 11
- Stops: 390
- Fleet: 28
- Fuel type: Diesel, Gasoline
- Operator: RATP Dev
- Chief executive: Shelly Kreger
- Website: www.ycipta.org

The Yuma County Area Transit (YCAT) system is a public transportation system based in Yuma County, Arizona. Since 1990 the agency has grown from a new transit service offering paratransit to the current mix of fixed-route and demand-responsive services serving over 32,000 riders per month, with an annual operating budget of $2.5 million.

Before 1999, only private transportation companies operated any type of transit service in Yuma County, with taxis serving the urbanized areas and private van services providing transportation between San Luis and Yuma. Paratransit in Yuma County began in February 1999. When the Saguaro Foundation began operating a public dial-a-ride system funded by Yuma Metropolitan Planning Organization (YMPO) in 1996, YMPO's fixed-route service began in February 1999 with service between San Luis and Yuma under the name Valley Transit.

The name YCAT or Yuma County Area Transit was adopted in 2002, with a new system of two routes, a local route within Yuma and an intercity route between San Luis and Yuma/Arizona Western College. YCAT service between Yuma and Foothills was initiated in 2001, but the ridership was not considered high enough to justify the cost, and the system was shortened to terminate at Arizona Western College.

After a comprehensive review of the transit system by Moore and Associates, as well as financial and operating difficulties in 2003 which nearly caused the fixed-route transit system to shut down, the city of Yuma and other member jurisdictions in Yuma County contributed additional funding to the system. YMPO selected a new operating contractor, and service survived. Two routes were added to the system in 2004, and an additional route to Wellton was initiated in January 2006. Service was expanded to 10:00 pm on all routes in the system on a network of seven routes.

In 2010, again after financial and operating difficulties, reductions in funding from the State of Arizona and local member entities, which resulted in the elimination of two routes within the City of Yuma, reduction of service hours from 6:00 am to 6:00 pm, Monday through Saturday. YCAT came very close to closing down. However, a new operations strategy adopted by YMPO came into play to save the transit system using a reduced level of local funding from its member entities with the exception of the City of Yuma. In December 2010, a new agency - Yuma County Intergovernmental Public Transportation Authority (YCIPTA) was formed to assume the operation of transit services from YMPO, which was completed on July 1, 2012. A new service delivery model was implemented on January 9, 2012, with a complete restructure of all routes to improve efficiency. Today, a total of 9 routes now operate Monday through Saturday on a fleet of 17 YCAT fixed route buses and 11 cutaways and vans.

Both demand-response and fixed-route service is administered and funded by the YCIPTA and its member agencies, and operated by a private contractor. Presently, YCIPTA owns all vehicles for fixed-route and demand-response service as well as the lease for the East 14th Street and Atlantic Avenue maintenance facility.

== What is YCIPTA ==
=== Yuma County Intergovernmental Public Transportation Authority (YCIPTA) ===
Under Arizona Revised Statutes - Title 28 Transportation, an intergovernmental public transportation authority (IPTA) may be organized in any county in Arizona with a population of two hundred thousand persons or less. Besides the YCIPTA, the Coconino and Yavapai Counties; the city of Flagstaff, and Northern Arizona University formed the Northern Arizona Intergovernmental Public Transportation Authority (NAIPTA) to assume public transit services from the city of Flagstaff, and Coconino County in an attempt to unify and coordinate public transit services in this region.

The YCIPTA is an IPTA that was formed on December 13, 2010, by the Yuma County Board of Supervisors to administer, plan, operate and maintain public transit services throughout Yuma County, including within the political jurisdictional boundaries of the Cities of Yuma, San Luis, Somerton, Town on Wellton and the unincorporated Yuma County areas.

Dial-A-Ride logo

On September 21, 2010, the Town of Wellton and City of Somerton passed a resolution to petition the county to form the IPTA. On October 3 and 20, 2010 respectively, the Cities of San Luis and Yuma passed a resolution to petition the county to form the IPTA. On December 6, 2010, Northern Arizona University petitioned the county to join the IPTA. On December 13, 2010, the County held a public hearing and approved the formation of the IPTA. On January 24, 2011, the Yuma County Intergovernmental Public Transportation Authority (YCIPTA) held its first Board of Directors meeting.

Since the first meeting, Arizona Western College, Quechan Indian Tribe, and Cocopah Indian Tribe has petition and joined the IPTA.

Support from the YMPO Executive Board was provided in August 2010 through the formation of a subcommittee to establish new governance structure for public transit management and again in August 2011 through the adoption of a resolution with an intent to transfer transit operations to YCIPTA by July 1, 2012. The transition was completed on July 1, 2012.

In 2014, National Express Transit replaced First Transit as the operator.

It is the intent that the Federal Transit Administration (FTA) funding that is used to support Yuma County Area Transit (YCAT) and Greater Yuma Area Dial-A-Ride (DAR) would be used by YCIPTA through YCIPTA designation as a grantee. YCIPTA would receive local match funding from the governmental entities, Indian tribes plus Northern Arizona University and Arizona Western College.

Yuma County Area Transit (YCAT) is the marketing name for the YCIPTA and the fixed route transit system. YCAT OnCall is the marketing name for the demand responsive transit system, previously known as Greater Yuma Area Dial-A-Ride. YCAT began in 2003 as a rebranded effort from what was previously known as Valley Transit. Greater Yuma Area Dial-A-Ride began in 1996 and was the county's first public transportation service. The Yuma Metropolitan Planning Organization (YMPO) has been the administrator of public transit service in Yuma County since 1999 utilizing Federal Transit Administration (FTA) funding that has been available to the Yuma Urbanized Area since 1980 when the urbanized area exceeds 50,000 in population. YCIPTA has since taken over.

YCIPTA is managed by a Transit Director with support staff. YCIPTA has agreements in place with Yuma County for human resources, financial services, Treasurer, Clerk of the Board, and Information Technology support. YCIPTA had a management agreement in place with YMPO to manage the day-to-day operations of the transit system until June 30, 2012.

There are nine board members that consist of City Administrators, Town Manager, Tribal Planning Directors, College Presidents and County Administrator from the member entities that set the overall policy for the transit system. Each member entity receives one vote on the board of directors. When financial contributions are discussed, the Board of Directors has opted towards a weighted voting structure to ensure that members that pay more into the system have fair representation. The Board of Directors meets on the 4th Monday of each month at 1:30 pm at Yuma County Development Services Building inside Aldrich Hall.

YCAT's services were provided under a contractual arrangement with First Transit of Cincinnati, Ohio. First Transit is part of First Group, a United Kingdom-based corporation that also consists of Greyhound, First Student and First Group operations in the United Kingdom. In 2018, they switched contractors to RATP, based out of Paris, France.

YCAT operates 28 buses. 17 buses are powered by diesel and used on YCAT fixed routes. 8 buses and 3 vans are powered by gasoline and used on YCAT OnCall. All buses and vans are owned by YCIPTA and were purchased with Federal Transit Administration funding.

== Routes ==
=== Regular Services (Mon-Sat) ===
Route	Terminals		Via	Notes
2	Yuma Downtown Yuma Transit Center (3rd St @ Gila St)	Yuma Arizona Western College	Pacific Avenue and 32nd Street	Interlines with route 95.
4	Yuma West Yuma Transfer Hub (26th St @ 23rd Ave)		Avenue B and Pacific Avenue	
4A	Yuma West Yuma Transfer Hub (26th St @ 23rd Ave)		Pacific Avenue and Avenue B	
5	Yuma Downtown Yuma Transit Center (3rd St @ Gila St)	Andrade, CA SR 186 @ Andrade Port of Entry	Winterhaven, CA	Trips alternate between providing deviated services on the Fort Yuma Indian Reservation and serving the Andrade Port of Entry.
6A	Cocopah Indian Reservation North Cocopah Reservation	Cocopah Indian Reservation West Cocopah Reservation	Avenue A and East Cocopah Reservation	
8	Yuma Arizona Western College	Wellton Arizona Ave @ William St	Fortuna Foothills and I-8.	
9	Yuma Arizona Western College	San Luis Avenue F @ San Pedro St	County 14th St and US-95	Runs only when college/university classes are in session, Mon-Thu.
10	Yuma Downtown Yuma Transit Center (3rd St @ Gila St)	El Centro, CA State St @ 7th St	Paradise Casino, Quechan Casino, and I-8	Runs only on Mondays, Wednesdays, and Fridays.
95	Yuma Downtown Yuma Transit Center (3rd St @ Gila St)	San Luis William Brooks Ave @ B St	US-95 and Cocopah Casino	Interlines with route 2.

=== Special Services ===
- NightCAT - service to AWC/NAU to Winterhaven, Yuma, Somerton, San Luis, Cocopah Reservations, Fortuna Foothills and unincorporated areas within a ¾ mile radius of existing YCAT routes only.
- On Dr. Martin Luther King Jr. Day, Presidents Day, Memorial Day, Independence Day, Labor Day and Veterans Day, limited service is provided between AWC/NAU/UA and Yuma Palms Regional Center on an advance reservation basis only.

=== Former Services ===
- 1 (Red) - went from Downtown Yuma Transit Center in a counterclockwise direction in the City of Yuma serving Redondo Center Drive, 1st Street, 4th Ave, West Yuma Transfer Hub at Walmart on 26th St at Avenue B, 32nd Street, Yuma Airport & Pacific Avenue.
- 3 (Brown) - former service from AWC/NAU/UA to Fortuna Foothills Branch Library via 32nd St, Fortuna Rd, 40th St, and Foothills Blvd.
- 7 (Violet) - former deviated fixed route service between Cocopah West Reservation, Cocopah East Reservation (westbound only), Mesa Verde/Orange Grove area and Cocopah Casino.
