= List of Baja California cities =

This is a list of the largest cities in Baja California. Populations are 2005 National Population Council (CONAPO) estimates. The following list includes information of cities from the Baja California municipalities of Mexicali, Ensenada, Playas de Rosarito, Tijuana and Tecate. Over 75% of the population lives in the largest city; Tijuana, the capital; Mexicali, or the port city of Ensenada

Largest cities (city proper) in Baja California
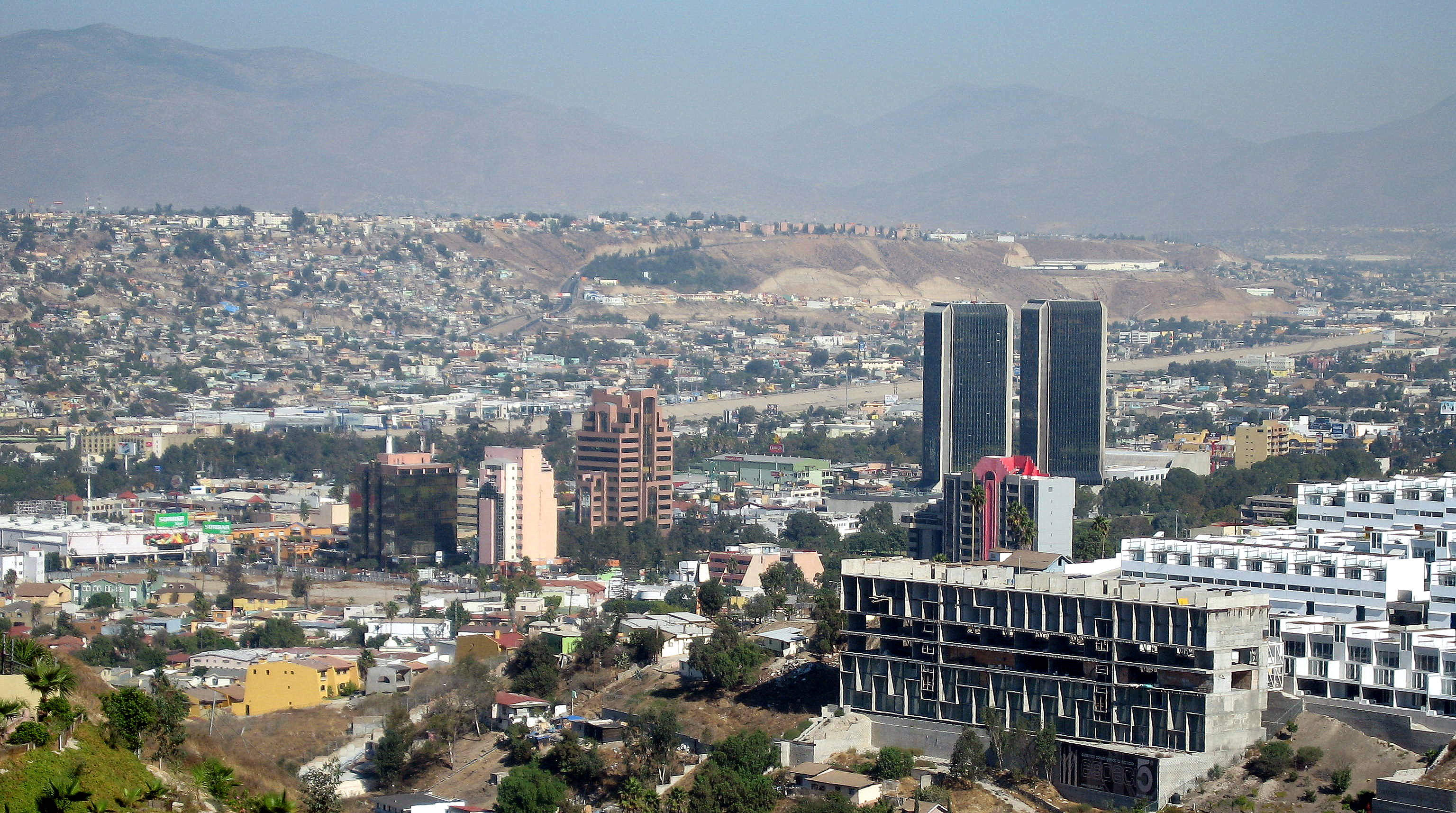
1 - Tijuana

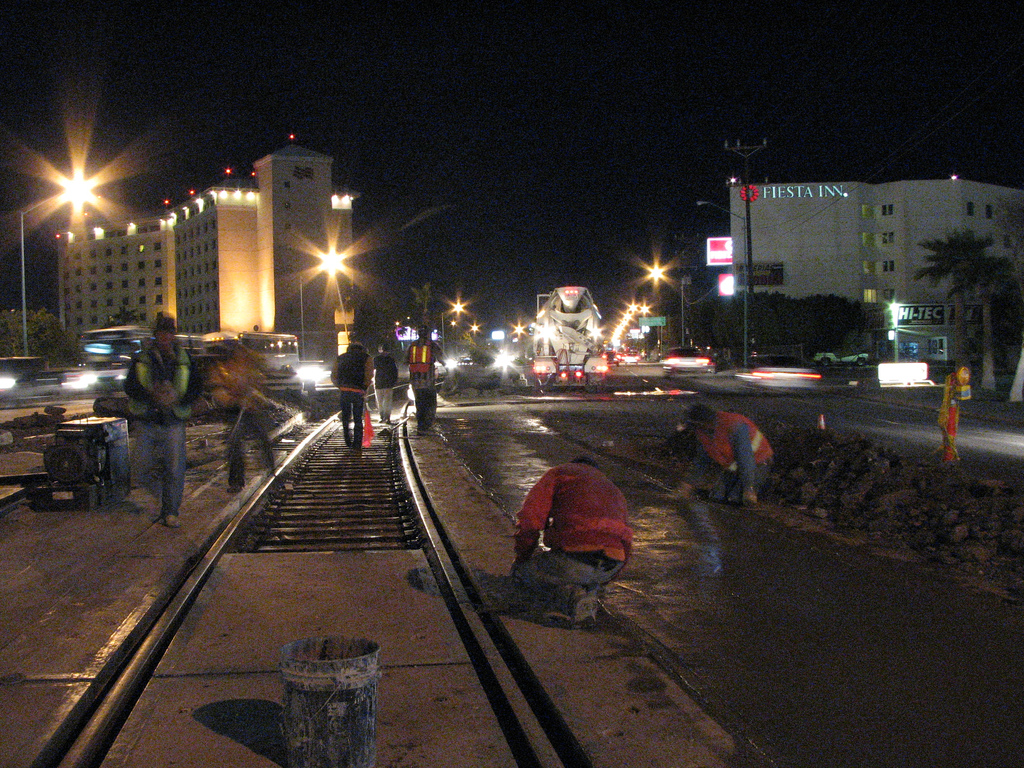
2 - Mexicali

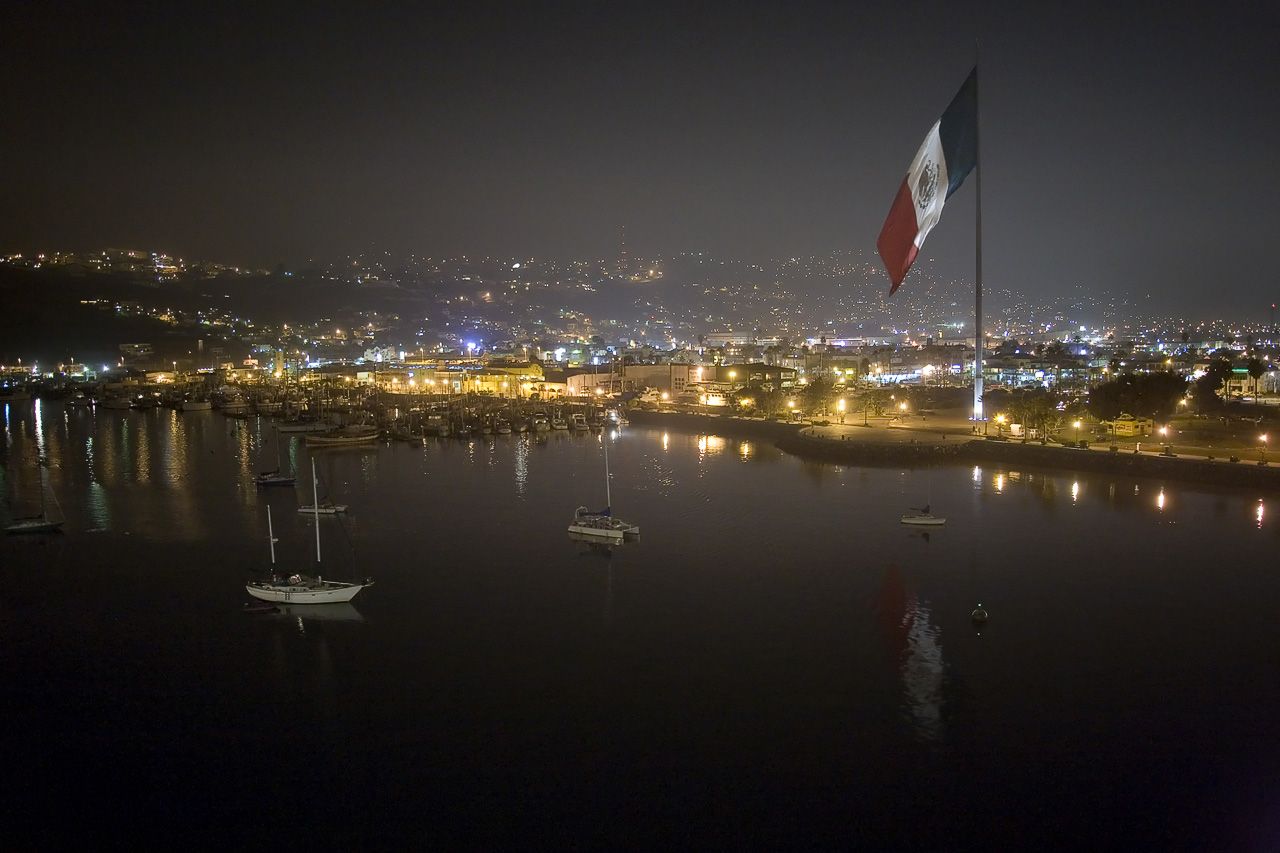
3 - Ensenada

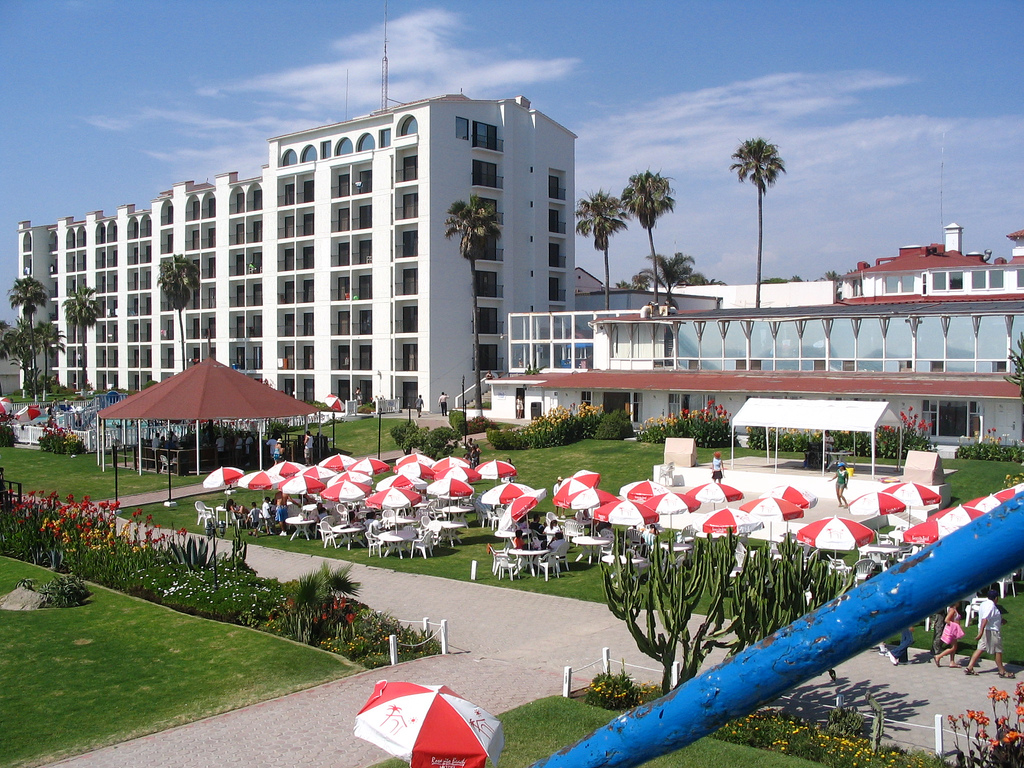
4 - Rosarito

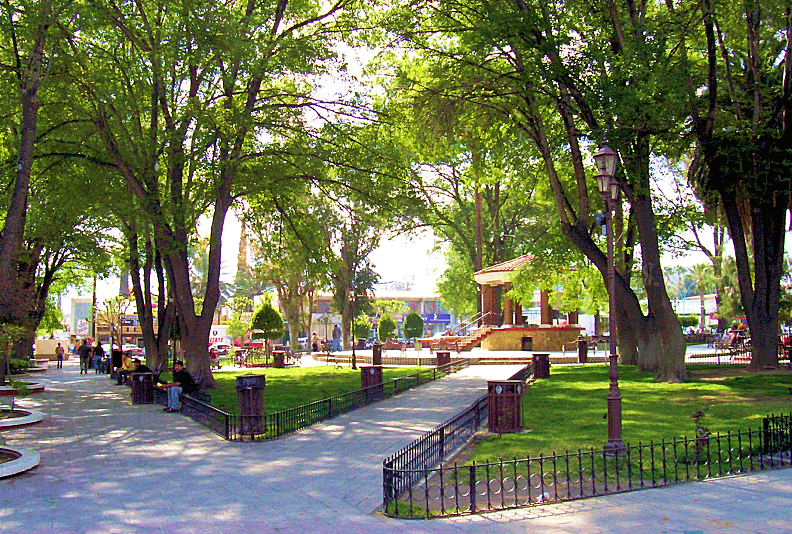
5 - Tecate

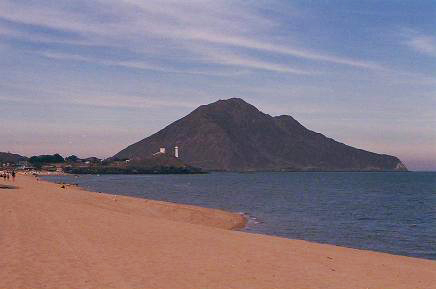
9 - San Felipe

Rank	City	Municipality	Population
1	Tijuana	Tijuana	1,650,351
2	Mexicali	Mexicali	996,826
3	Ensenada	Ensenada	689,075
4	Rosarito	Playas de Rosarito	65,278
5	Tecate	Tecate	64,764
6	Santa Isabel	Mexicali	29,311
7	La Joya	Tijuana	26,860
8	Guadalupe Victoria	Mexicali	17,119
9	San Felipe	San Felipe	16,702
10	Chapultepec	Ensenada	7,055
11	Puebla	Mexicali	7,014
12	Lomas de Santa Anita	Tecate	6,877
13	Ciudad Morelos	Mexicali	6,814
14	Nueva Colonia Ejido Hindu	Tecate	6,406
15	Alberto Oviedo Mota	Mexicali	5,835
16	Coahuila City	Mexicali	5,333
17	Delta	Mexicali	5,278
18	Ejido Hermosillo	Mexicali	5,082
19	Progreso	Mexicali	5,071
20	San Quintin	Ensenada	5,021
21	Vicente Guerrero	Ensenada	4,697
22	Los Algodones	Mexicali	4,021
23	Batáquez	Mexicali	3,758
24	Paredones	Mexicali	3,390
25	Nuevo León	Mexicali	3,255
26	Michoacan de Ocampo	Mexicali	3,065
27	Pueblo de Cedros	Ensenada	2,696
28	Colonia Luis Echeverria	Tecate	2,235
29	Valle de Las Palmas	Tecate	1,797
30	La Rumorosa	Tecate	1,615
31	Andalucia	Tecate	1,116
32	Punta Colonet	Ensenada	1,113
33	Bahía de los Ángeles	San Quintin	1,109
