= Same-sex marriage in Baja California =

Same-sex marriage has been legal in Baja California since 3 November 2017 when the Secretary General of Government, Francisco Rueda Gómez, instructed the state's civil registry to immediately begin issuing marriage licenses to same-sex couples and cease enforcement of the state's same-sex marriage ban. This was in line with jurisprudence established by the Mexican Supreme Court, which has ruled that same-sex marriage bans violate Articles 1 and 4 of the Constitution of Mexico. Previously, Baja California had banned same-sex marriage both by statute and in its state constitution.

On 16 June 2021, the Congress of Baja California passed legislation to remove a same-sex marriage ban added to the State Constitution in 2011 and to amend the Civil Code to recognize the right of same-sex couples to marry.

== Legal history ==
=== Background ===
On 18 March 2013, a male same-sex couple applied to marry in Ensenada. Their application was denied on 21 March, and they filed an amparo in court on 12 April 2014. On 31 October 2014, the Seventh District Court ordered city officials to perform the marriage. Officials in Ensenada announced they would abide by the court decision and perform the marriage.

On 17 June 2013, Víctor Fernando Urías Amparo and Víctor Manuel Aguirre Espinoza were denied the right to marry in Mexicali and filed an amparo. It was approved in October 2013, but was appealed by the civil registrar to the Supreme Court. On 25 June 2014, the Supreme Court ruled that the same-sex marriage ban violated the Constitution of Mexico. "Excluding couples of the same sex goes against the right of persons to self-determination and for every individual's personality to develop freely.", the court ruled. The court granted the plaintiff couple the right to marry, but under Mexico's legal system the court decision did not legalize same-sex marriage statewide. On 31 October 2014, the civil registrar of Mexicali, Adriana Guadalupe Ramirez, notified the couple that the decision would not be appealed, the refusal was withdrawn, and the marriage could proceed. Though Ramirez scheduled the ceremony for 21 November 2014, when the couple appeared in the wedding hall to marry, the judge refused to perform the ceremony and the celebrants were evacuated after a bomb threat was received. The civil registry claimed that discrepancies in documents had been rectified and announced a rescheduling of the wedding to 10 January 2015. On 10 January, the couple again returned to the registry for their marriage ceremony, which was declined for the fourth time, under a citizen's allegation that the couple suffered from "insanity". The citizen who made the allegation was an official who performed premarital counseling required by the city and who had refused to give the couple the certificate that they had completed the counseling. In response to the ongoing controversy in Mexicali, officials in Tijuana announced that they were willing to comply with any injunction and marry same-sex couples if ordered by a court to do so. Lawyers for the couple filed contempt of court proceedings against the mayor and registrar for failure to carry out the instructions of the Supreme Court. During a protest march organized by LGBT activists, officials in Mexicali announced that they were dismissing the accusation of "insanity" and were ready to perform the marriage. On 17 January 2015, the couple became the first same-sex couple to marry in Baja California.

On 6 August 2013, a lesbian couple, Reyna Isabel Soberanes Cuadras and Jacqueline Ramos Meza, were denied a marriage license by the civil registrar in Mexicali, and filed an amparo in court. They received notice that the amparo had been granted on 30 December 2013. Three additional amparos were filed in September 2014. One of the three couples married on 14 May 2016 after having received approval by a court. On 22 January 2015, Meritxell Calderón Vargas and Nancy Bonilla Luna applied to marry in Tijuana but were rejected citing the same reasons given to the other couples. The couple vowed to fight the denial in court. Their amparo was granted, and the couple announced in December 2019 that their marriage ceremony would take place in March 2020. Ten people from Tijuana filed an amparo for same-sex marriage rights in June 2015. It was granted by a court on 18 March 2016. On 22 December 2016, a judge granted an amparo to another same-sex couple.

On 14 January 2015, Raúl Ramírez Baena, director of the Citizens' Commission of Human Rights of the Northeast (CCDH, Comisión Ciudadana de Derechos Humanos del Noroeste), filed a petition with Governor Francisco Vega de Lamadrid and municipal officials, asking them to provide notification on how to proceed with same-sex marriages in compliance with the Supreme Court ruling. On 22 February 2017, the head of Baja California's adoption agency announced that same-sex couples have the right to adopt in the state, in line with jurisprudence established by the Supreme Court.

=== Legislative action ===
==== Constitutional ban (2011) ====
On 23 August 2010, shortly after the ruling of the Mexican Supreme Court requiring all states to recognize same-sex marriages validly performed in other states, state legislators proposed an amendment to article 7 of the Constitution of Baja California, adding the definition of marriage as being the "union between a man and a woman". On 29 September 2010, the Congress of Baja California voted 18–1 in favor of the constitutional amendment. After approval by at least 3 of the state's 5 municipalities, the reform was published on 27 May 2011, and went into force.

==== Same-sex marriage law (2021) ====
A bill was introduced in the Congress of Baja California on 12 February 2015 to legalize same-sex marriage by amending article 7 of the State Constitution. Opponents were successful in delaying the measure for several years.

On 16 July 2020, an amendment to repeal the same-sex marriage ban failed in Congress, with 15 legislators in favor, 3 opposed and 7 abstentions. While a majority of deputies voted to remove the ban, a two-thirds majority was required. The proposal was put to another vote later that same month. Again, it failed to meet the two-thirds threshold; 16 legislators voted in favor, 3 were opposed and 6 abstained, failing to meet the required 17 votes to modify the Constitution.

On 16 June 2021, Congress approved a same-sex marriage bill introduced by Deputy Julia Andrea González. The legislation was passed 18–4, reaching the two-thirds threshold needed to amend the Constitution. The bill was supported by the National Regeneration Movement (MORENA), the Labor Party (PT), the Party of the Democratic Revolution (PRD) and the local Party of Baja California (PBC), as well as two independent deputies. Ratification by a majority of the state's 6 municipalities within the next 30 days (i.e. by 17 July 2021) was needed for the constitutional amendment to take effect. If the municipalities did not act by that date, they were considered to having consented to the amendment (known as "constructive assent", afirmativa ficta). At the end of the process, all 6 municipalities had ratified the constitutional change; 3 voted in favor of the amendment (Mexicali, Tecate, and Tijuana), while the remaining 3 did not vote and as such were considered to having assented (Ensenada, Playas de Rosarito, and San Quintín). The reform was published in the state's official journal on 8 August 2021, following promulgation by Governor Jaime Bonilla Valdez.

The legislation removed the same-sex marriage ban added to the Constitution of Baja California in 2011, and modified article 143 of the Civil Code to read:

- in Spanish: El matrimonio es la unión libre de dos personas para realizar la comunidad de vida, en donde ambas se procuran respeto, igualdad y ayuda mutua. Debe celebrarse ante el Oficial del Registro Civil y con las formalidades que estipule el presente Código.
- (Marriage is the free union of two people with the purpose of building a community of life, where both partners seek respect, equality and mutual aid. It must be solemnized by the officials of the Civil Registry and with the formalities stipulated in this Code.)

Political party	Members	Yes	No	Abstain
National Regeneration Movement	14	11	1	2
Labor Party	2	2		
National Action Party	2		2	
Ecologist Green Party of Mexico	2	1	1	
Independent	2	2		
Institutional Revolutionary Party	1			1
Party of the Democratic Revolution	1	1		
Partido de Baja California	1	1		
Total	25	18	4	3

=== Government decree (2017) ===
On 3 November 2017, the Secretary General of Government, Francisco Rueda Gómez, issued a decree announcing that the state would cease to enforce its ban on same-sex marriages. It instructed the state's civil registry to immediately begin issuing marriage licenses to same-sex couples without requiring the couples to obtain an amparo in court.

In late December 2017, the State Commission of Human Rights urged state officials to comply with the decision and issue marriage licenses to same-sex couples. Officials in Mexicali continued to refuse to issue licenses over the following two years, but they had begun issuing licenses by late December 2019. In early 2020, the civil registry instructed all civil registrars in the state to process marriage applications by same-sex couples in an identical manner to opposite-sex couples.

== Marriage statistics ==
From 2015 to mid-2018, 34 same-sex couples married in Baja California; 18 in Tijuana, 12 in Mexicali, 3 in Ensenada, and 1 in Tecate. The State Commission of Human Rights noted that while same-sex marriage has been legal in the state since November 2017 several same-sex couples were denied marriage licenses following legalization. In July 2018, the Commission recorded 72 cases, mostly in Tijuana. Many couples were rejected based on the state's marriage laws which still retained a ban on same-sex marriages. The Commission urged Congress to explicitly amend its marriage laws to close the loophole (as it finally did in June 2021), and reminded state officials that it is illegal to refuse to issue marriage licenses to qualified same-sex couples.

By the end of 2018, 186 same-sex couples had married in the state, mostly in Tijuana. By the end of June 2021, approximatively 350 same-sex marriages had been performed in Baja California.

The following table shows the number of same-sex marriages performed in Baja California since 2020 as reported by the National Institute of Statistics and Geography.

Number of marriages performed in Baja California
Year	Same-sex			Opposite-sex	Total	% same-sex
Year	Female	Male	Total	Opposite-sex	Total	% same-sex
2020	85	52	137	11,112	11,249	1.22%
2021	220	179	399	14,927	15,326	2.60%

== Public opinion ==
A 2017 opinion poll conducted by Gabinete de Comunicación Estratégica found that 53% of Baja California residents supported same-sex marriage, while 43% were opposed.

According to a 2018 survey by the National Institute of Statistics and Geography, 31% of the Baja California public opposed same-sex marriage. This was the second lowest in all of Mexico, behind Mexico City at 29%.

== See also ==
- Same-sex marriage in Mexico
- LGBT rights in Mexico
- LGBTQ culture in Tijuana
