= Batáquez =

Batáquez Estación Batáquez / Ejido Monterrey
- Town and Municipality
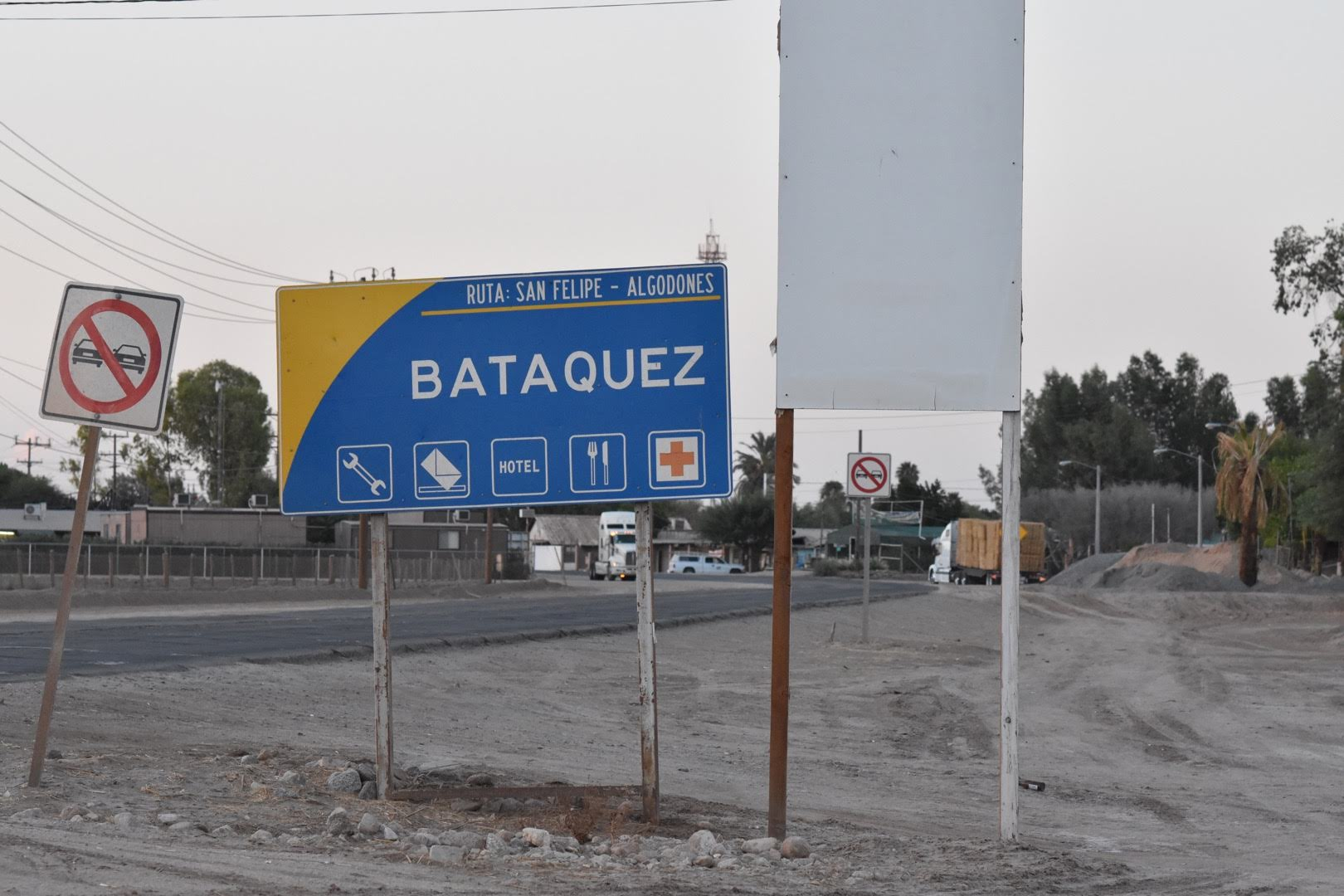

- Location in Mexico
- Coordinates: 32°32′58″N 115°4′15″W
- Country: Mexico
- State: Baja California
- Municipality: Mexicali
- Elevation: 20 m (66 ft)

Population (2020)
  - Total: 1,145
- Time zone: UTC−08:00 (Zona Noroeste)
  - Summer (DST): UTC–07:00 (DST)
- Area code: +52 658

Batáquez, Estación Batáquez or Ejido Monterrey is a Mexican locality in the Mexicali Valley, in municipality of Mexicali, Baja California. According to data from INEGI, it had 1,145 inhabitants as of 2020. Despite being a small locality, Batáquez has local importance since it is head of the municipal delegation of the same name.

Batáquez is accessed mainly by the federal highway No. 2, which crosses the town from east to west, and by the state highway No. 3, which intersects in this locality with the federal highway No. 2 and heads south. This state highway is the road that connects Batáquez with Guadalupe Victoria, which is the most important town in the valley area of Mexicali.

== Name ==
The name Batáquez Station is derived from the fact that, from the beginning until the mid-twentieth century, there was a railway station of the Inter-California Railway or "pachuco train" called "Batáquez". Over time, the population of Ejido Monterrey came to be located next to the aforementioned station.

== History ==
In 1904, the company Southern Pacific was authorized to build a railway line south of the border to complete the stretch that would connect San Diego with Yuma. This branch entered Mexican territory in Mexicali, then went east to Los Algodones, and from there crossed the international line again until it reached Yuma. This railroad was known as Inter-California Railway, but it was popularly called El Chinero. This was because most of its users through the valley were Chinese, who moved from one ranch to another for agricultural work and populated the rural areas in greater numbers than Mexicans. Along the way, towns emerged at the railway stations, including Batáquez.

Historical Demography
Censos Years	Population
1921	197
1930	377
1940	146
1950	340
1960	583
1970	625
1980	852
1990	983
1995	1,076
2000	1,258
2005	1,127
2010	1,121
