= Calexico–Mexicali =

Transborder agglomeration in California and Baja California

- Transborder Agglomeration
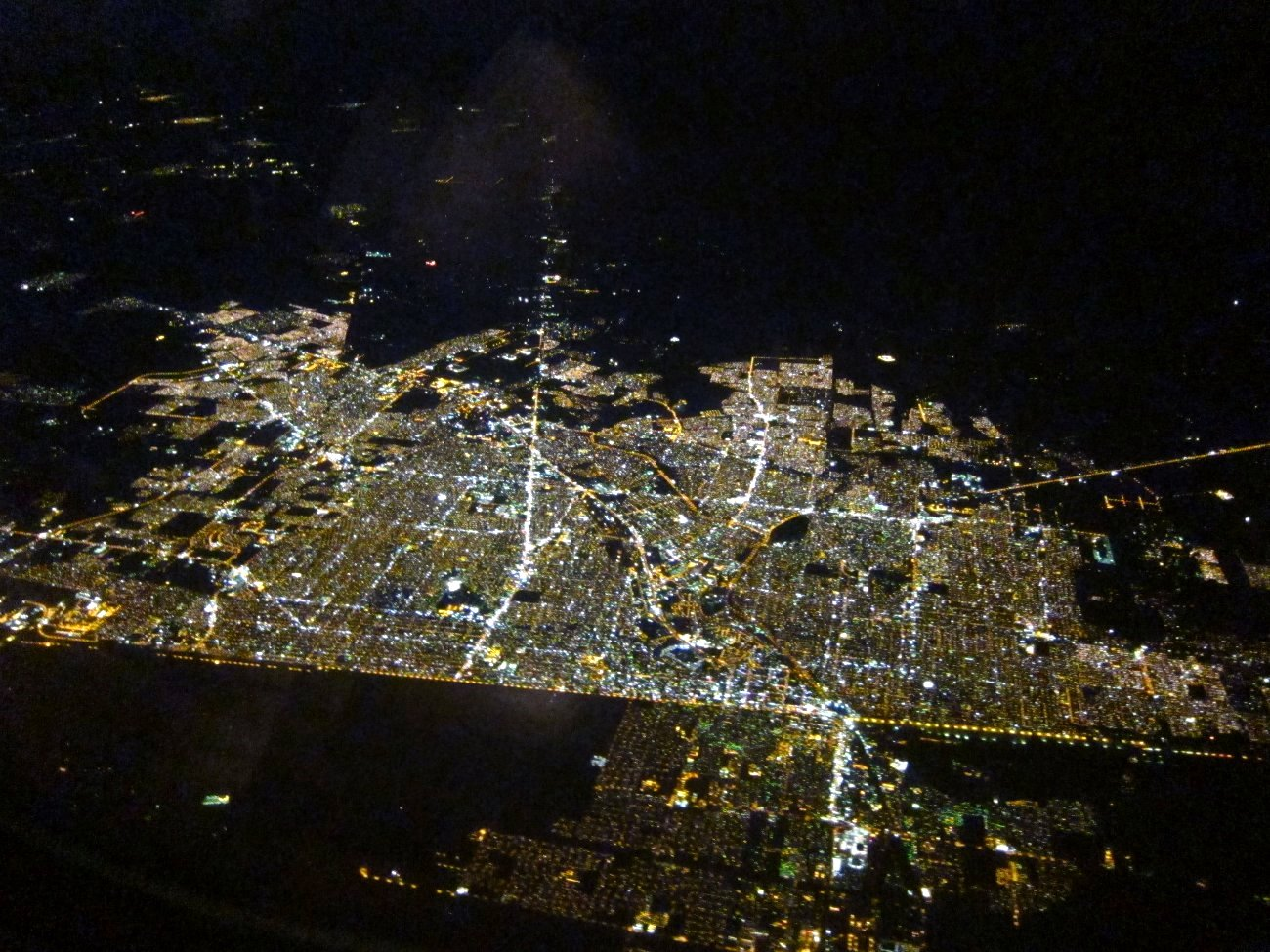
- Mexicali and Calexico urban area, viewed at night from the American side of the border
Map of Calexico–Mexicali
Transborder Agglomeration
El Centro, CA MSA
Municipio de Mexicali
- Country: United States; Mexico
- State: California; Baja California
- Principal cities: Mexicali: Calexico; El Centro; Imperial; Santa Isabel
- Time zone: UTC–08:00 (Zona Noroeste)
  - Summer (DST): UTC–07:00 (DST)

Calexico–Mexicali is a transborder agglomeration in southeastern California (in the United States) and northwestern Baja California (in Mexico) with its center being the border between the sister cities of Calexico and Mexicali. The agglomeration lies within a large geologic region known as the Salton Trough with the city of Calexico located in the Imperial Valley on the United States side of the border, and Mexicali located in the Mexicali Valley on the Mexico side of the border.

Calexico–Mexicali is one of two transborder agglomerations on the California-Baja California border; the other is San Diego–Tijuana.

== See also ==
- Metropolitan areas of Mexico § Transnational conurbations
