= Santa Isabel, Mexico =

Santa Isabel, Mexico may refer to:

- Santa Isabel, Baja California
- Santa Isabel, Chihuahua
