= Venustiano Carranza, Baja California =

Venustiano Carranza
- Community
- Interactive map of Venustiano Carranza
- Coordinates: 32°13′39″N 115°10′13″W
- Country: Mexico
- State: Baja California
- Municipality: Mexicali

Population (2010)
  - Total: 6,098
- Time zone: UTC–08:00 (Zona Noroeste)
  - Summer (DST): UTC–07:00 (DST)

Venustiano Carranza is a small community located in the Mexican State of Baja California. It is located in the municipality of Mexicali and serves as a borough seat of its surrounding area.

The intersection of Baja California State Highways 1 and 4 there is called the Crucero Ledón. It is located 50 kilometers south of Mexicali, the capital of Baja California. The 2010 census reported a population of 6,098 inhabitants.
