= Ciudad Morelos, Baja California =

Ciudad Morelos (Cuervos)
- Town and Municipality
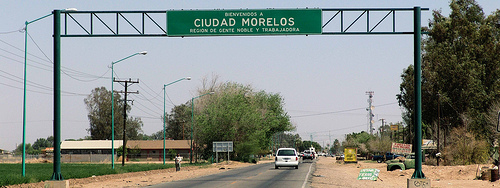

- Location in Mexico Ciudad Morelos (Mexico)
- Coordinates: 32°37′51″N 114°51′25″W
- Country: Mexico
- State: Baja California
- Municipality: Mexicali
- Elevation: 92 ft (28 m)

Population (2020)
  - Total: 9,572
- Time zone: UTC–08:00 (Zona Noroeste)
  - Summer (DST): UTC–07:00 (DST)
- Area code: +52 658

Ciudad Morelos (Cuervos) is a town in the Mexicali Valley, a municipal demarcation that belongs to the municipality of Mexicali, Baja California, Mexico. Founded on 20 October 1909, it is considered one of the most important communities in the valley, the second most populous, according to the number of inhabitants reported in the 2020 census, which amounted to 9,572 people.

The name Cuervos, as it is mostly known, derives from the fact that in this town there was a railway station of the so-called Intercalifornia Railroad, which received the name Estación Cuervos.

== Geography ==
Ciudad Morelos is located approximately 50 km (31 mi) from the state capital, Mexicali. It is connected by state highway number 6 and by state highway number 15, the latter exits to the north to intersect with state highway number 8 that leads to Los Algodones and to the south it intersects with state highway number 2; Number 6 communicates to the northeast with the ejido República Mexicana and to the southwest with the town of Paredones; a local road leads to the southeast and also intersects with state highway number 2 near Colonia Granados and Colonia 5 de Mayo. To the north, practically conurbated with Ciudad Morelos, are the Álamo neighborhood, La Culebra neighborhood, and La Panga.

On the other hand, although it is close to the border, there is no border crossing that connects it with the United States, with the city of Somerton on the other side of the border.

Cuervos is a relevant town within the Mexicali Valley. It is the seventh most important town by number of inhabitants within the municipality, and traditionally it is considered the second most important after Guadalupe Victoria in the valley area. Ciudad Morelos is home to one of the UABC university campuses.

== History ==
Around 1901, in the Valley of Mexicali, the first railway in the north of Mexico began to be designed, the Intercalifornia known as El Pachuco. This railway project was financed with capital from the United States. The Government of Porfirio Díaz had not contemplated the use of the Baja California region, so the Americans requested to transport supplies by train between their cities of San Diego and Yuma. On 6 May 1904, a contract was signed between the Government of Mexico and the Southern Pacific, Compañía del Ferrocarril del Sur, however the successive floods of the Colorado River between 1905 and 1907, interrupted the service that was normalized until August 1909. It was in operation for 50 years, from August 1909 to March 1959, traveling the Mexicali-Algodones route. It mainly transported passengers that crossed the northern part of the Mexicali Valley with the United States border line, through 18 railway stations: Mexicali, Packard, Ampac, Palaco, Pascualitos, Sesbania, Casey, Cucapa, Pólvora, Hechicera, Burdick, Volcano, Bataques, Tecolotes, Paredones, Cuervos, Dieguinos, Algodones, to later interconnect with Yuma.
