= Boroughs of Mexico =

In Mexico, some municipalities and Mexico City are divided into “boroughs” for administrative purposes. Boroughs are known as delegaciones, or in the case of Mexico City, demarcaciones territoriales. Boroughs can either be second-level semi-autonomous administrative divisions or third-level non-autonomous administrative divisions. The limits, nature and competencies of boroughs are usually described in the constitutions of the states they are part of, or in the laws enacted by the municipality itself, and may differ from municipality to municipality.

== Boroughs of Mexico City ==
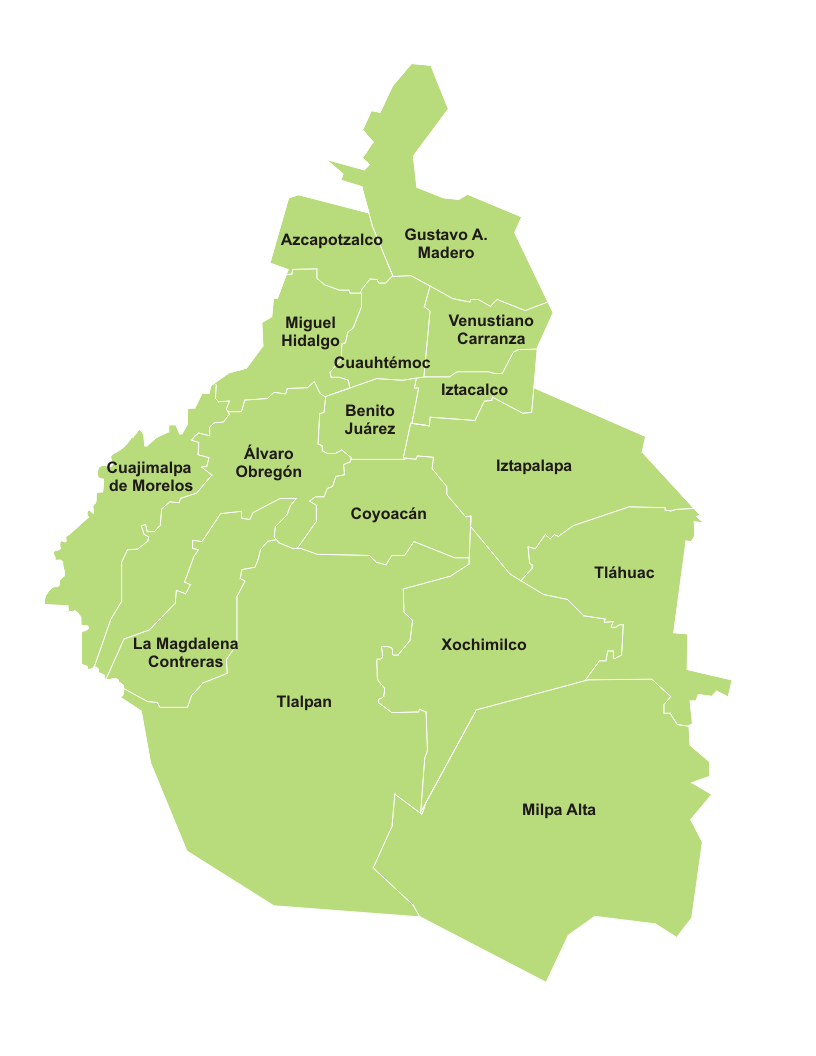
The 16 boroughs of the Federal District

Mexico City is not organized into municipalities. Despite containing the word "City", it is not governed as a city but as a unit consisting of multiple subdivisions. As a result of the political reforms enacted in 2016, it is no longer designated as a federal district and became a city, a member entity of the Mexican federation, seat of the powers of the union and the capital of Mexico.

Mexico City is divided into 16 boroughs, officially designated as demarcaciones territoriales or colloquially known as alcaldías in Spanish. Headed by a mayor, these boroughs kept the same territory and name as the former delegaciones, while expanding their local government powers.

== Boroughs of other municipalities ==
The boroughs of other municipalities are territorial or administrative divisions and in some cases they pertain exclusively to the urbanized areas of the municipality. Municipalities are second-level administrative divisions, and boroughs of municipalities are third-level (unlike those in the Federal District, which are second-level). Municipal boroughs are non-autonomous, but function merely as the internal divisions whereby the administration of public services is organized. Not all municipalities are divided into boroughs; some municipalities use only auxiliary councils or presidencies (presidencia auxiliar in Spanish) to administer the cities or towns that are not adjacent to the city that serves as the seat of the municipal council (ayuntamiento in Spanish), whereas boroughs are usually—but not always—used when the entire municipality is urbanized and is coextensive with a single city.

Some of the municipalities that are divided into boroughs are:

- Baja California

Municipality of Mexicali, is divided into 14 boroughs composing the entire municipality, the city of Mexicali comprises the municipal seat plus 3 metropolitan boroughs.
Municipality of Tijuana, is divided into 8 boroughs that compose the entire municipality, the city of Tijuana metropolitan area comprises all 8 boroughs.
Municipality of Ensenada, the largest municipality in the country is divided in 24 boroughs of which the city of Ensenada comprises the two smallest (Ensenada and Chapultepec).
Municipality of Tecate, is divided into 6 boroughs composing the entire municipality.

- Querétaro

Querétaro, is divided into 7 boroughs that compose the entire municipality, most of which is urbanized. Greater Querétaro, that is the metropolitan area of Querétaro, includes other municipalities.

- Quintana Roo

Benito Juárez, is divided into three boroughs that compose the entire municipality.

- Tabasco

Centro, is divided into 133 boroughs, of which 30 pertain to the city of Villahermosa, 8 to other towns (7 villas and one poblado) and 95 to rural areas (rancherías).

== See also ==
- Colonia (Mexico)
- Political divisions of Mexico
- Municipalities of Mexico
