= La Rumorosa =

- Town and Municipality
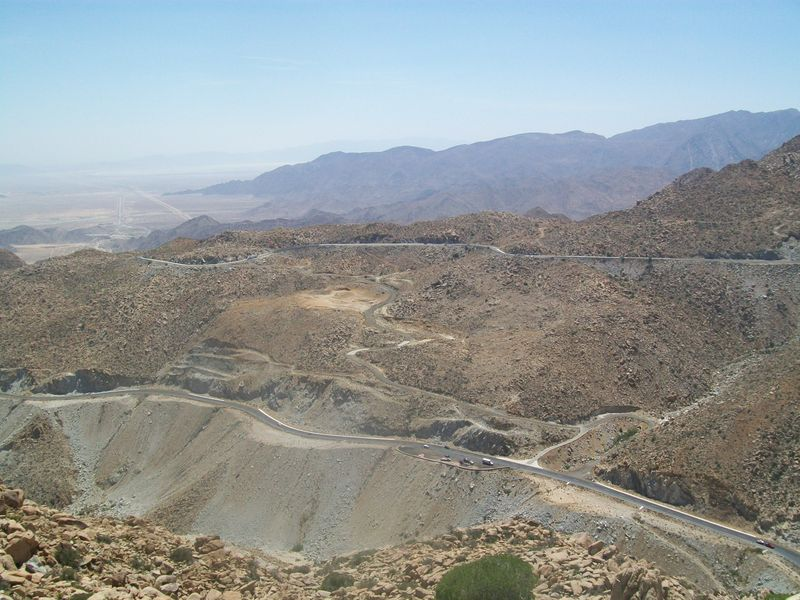

- Location in Mexico La Rumorosa (Mexico)
- Coordinates: 32°31′N 116°04′W
- Country: Mexico
- State: Baja California
- Municipality: Tecate
- Elevation: 4,193 ft (1,278 m)

Population (2010)
  - Total: 1,836
- Time zone: UTC–08:00 (Zona Noroeste)
  - Summer (DST): UTC–07:00 (DST)
- Area code: +52 686

La Rumorosa is a town in the municipality of Tecate, Baja California, Mexico. It has a population of 1,836 inhabitants. It lies on the road between Tecate and Mexicali, and it is directly across the international border from Jacumba Hot Springs, California. However, no official border crossing exists; the nearest official crossing is in Tecate. The La Rumorosa area contains Native American cave paintings, which are the primary tourist draw.

== Geographic location ==
The town is located at 32° 31' N by 116° 04' W and has an altitude of 1278 meters.

== Demographics ==
The 1980 census recorded a population of 531 inhabitants. In 1990, it rose to 1387 inhabitants, and, in 1995 there was a decrease to 1246 inhabitants. During the 2000 census, the population stood at 2,033 inhabitants. In 2005, INEGI registered a population of 1615 inhabitants.

== Roadway ==
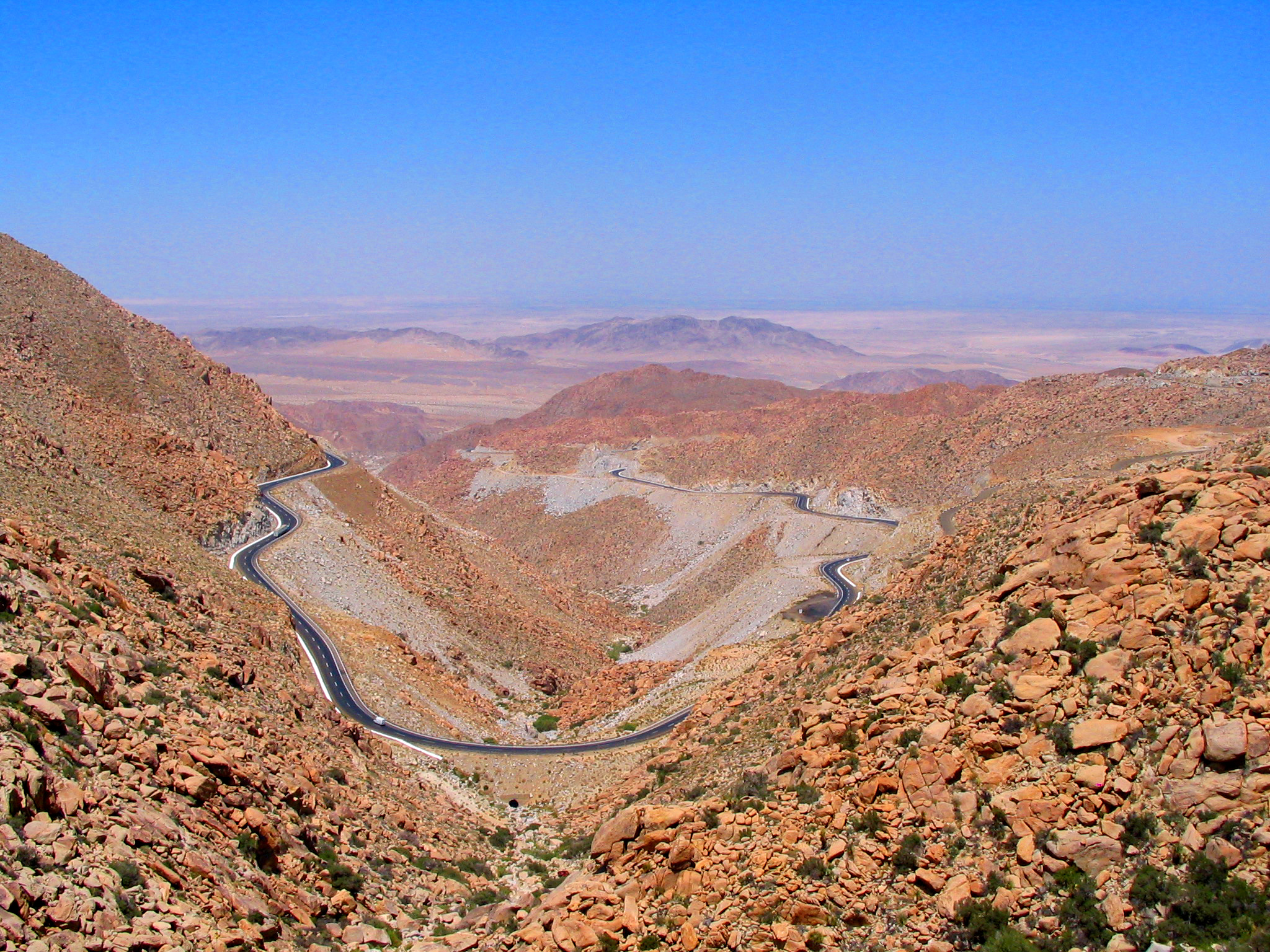
La Rumorosa

La Rumorosa also refers to the famous road that crosses the Sierra de Juárez Mountains in Baja California, which is part of Mexican Federal Highway 2D. This was completed in 1917 under the governorship of Esteban Cantu. Before this road was constructed, land travel between Tijuana and the rest of Mexico required travel through the United States.

Initially, this road was a two-way street only somewhat dangerous due to the wind in the region and the steep grade of the road, as well as the recklessness of some drivers to try to finish this stretch of highway faster, causing numerous accidents. Currently there are two two-lane roads each, one upstream and the other downstream, with improved marking and consequently, a significant reduction of accidents.

However, even with security measures, the road is still considered one of the most dangerous for inexperienced drivers, so it is always advisable to observe a minimum safe distance, to not exceed the speed limit, and use engine braking whenever possible. Headlights are advised in adverse conditions.

== El Vallecito artifacts ==
In the town of La Rumorosa is the archaeological site "El Vallecito", a collection of native paintings that are a true portrait of the native American heritage of Baja California.

The sites also contain pottery scattered on guards and a lot of mortars. To date, in El Vallecito more than 18 sets of paintings have been identified, important ones are: the "Rooted Man" group, the "Indian Cave," "The Imp" group, the "Wittinñur" group and "The Shark".

== Climate ==
Owing to its relatively high altitude, La Rumorosa has a cool semi-arid climate (Köppen BSk), just above an arid climate (BWk). During the winter season can occur with prolonged cold periods of significant snowfall, with January being the month with the most snow. The area is subject to sporadic summer thunderstorms known as monsoons, whilst in winter snow storms occasionally affect the region. The average temperature of La Rumorosa in the coldest month (January) is 7.3 °C (45.1 °F) and the hottest month (July) 25.3 °C (77.5 °F). The area has strong winds, facilitating development of wind power.

Climate data for La Rumorosa (1951–2010)
Month	Jan	Feb	Mar	Apr	May	Jun	Jul	Aug	Sep	Oct	Nov	Dec	Year
Record high °C (°F)	27.0 (80.6)	28.0 (82.4)	31.0 (87.8)	33.0 (91.4)	38.0 (100.4)	45.0 (113.0)	42.0 (107.6)	40.0 (104.0)	40.0 (104.0)	39.0 (102.2)	35.0 (95.0)	30.0 (86.0)	45.0 (113.0)
Mean daily maximum °C (°F)	12.8 (55.0)	13.5 (56.3)	15.5 (59.9)	19.0 (66.2)	23.1 (73.6)	28.9 (84.0)	32.5 (90.5)	31.7 (89.1)	28.4 (83.1)	22.9 (73.2)	17.1 (62.8)	13.6 (56.5)	21.6 (70.9)
Daily mean °C (°F)	7.3 (45.1)	7.9 (46.2)	9.5 (49.1)	12.2 (54.0)	15.8 (60.4)	21.2 (70.2)	25.3 (77.5)	24.7 (76.5)	21.5 (70.7)	16.3 (61.3)	11.1 (52.0)	7.9 (46.2)	15.1 (59.2)
Mean daily minimum °C (°F)	1.9 (35.4)	2.4 (36.3)	3.4 (38.1)	5.4 (41.7)	8.5 (47.3)	13.5 (56.3)	18.1 (64.6)	17.8 (64.0)	14.5 (58.1)	9.7 (49.5)	5.1 (41.2)	2.2 (36.0)	8.5 (47.3)
Record low °C (°F)	−20.0 (−4.0)	−18.0 (−0.4)	−9.0 (15.8)	−5.0 (23.0)	−3.0 (26.6)	1.0 (33.8)	4.0 (39.2)	6.0 (42.8)	0.0 (32.0)	−4.0 (24.8)	−18.0 (−0.4)	−12.0 (10.4)	−20.0 (−4.0)
Average precipitation mm (inches)	24.8 (0.98)	17.7 (0.70)	20.7 (0.81)	10.3 (0.41)	2.0 (0.08)	0.8 (0.03)	9.6 (0.38)	12.8 (0.50)	8.8 (0.35)	12.8 (0.50)	15.1 (0.59)	20.6 (0.81)	156.0 (6.14)
Average precipitation days (≥ 0.1 mm)	3.3	2.7	2.8	1.5	0.4	0.2	1.0	1.4	1.0	1.1	1.7	2.4	19.5
Source: Servicio Meteorologico Nacional

== See also ==
- Baja California
- Mexicali
- Tecate
