= Progreso, Baja California =

City in the Mexican state of Baja California

- City
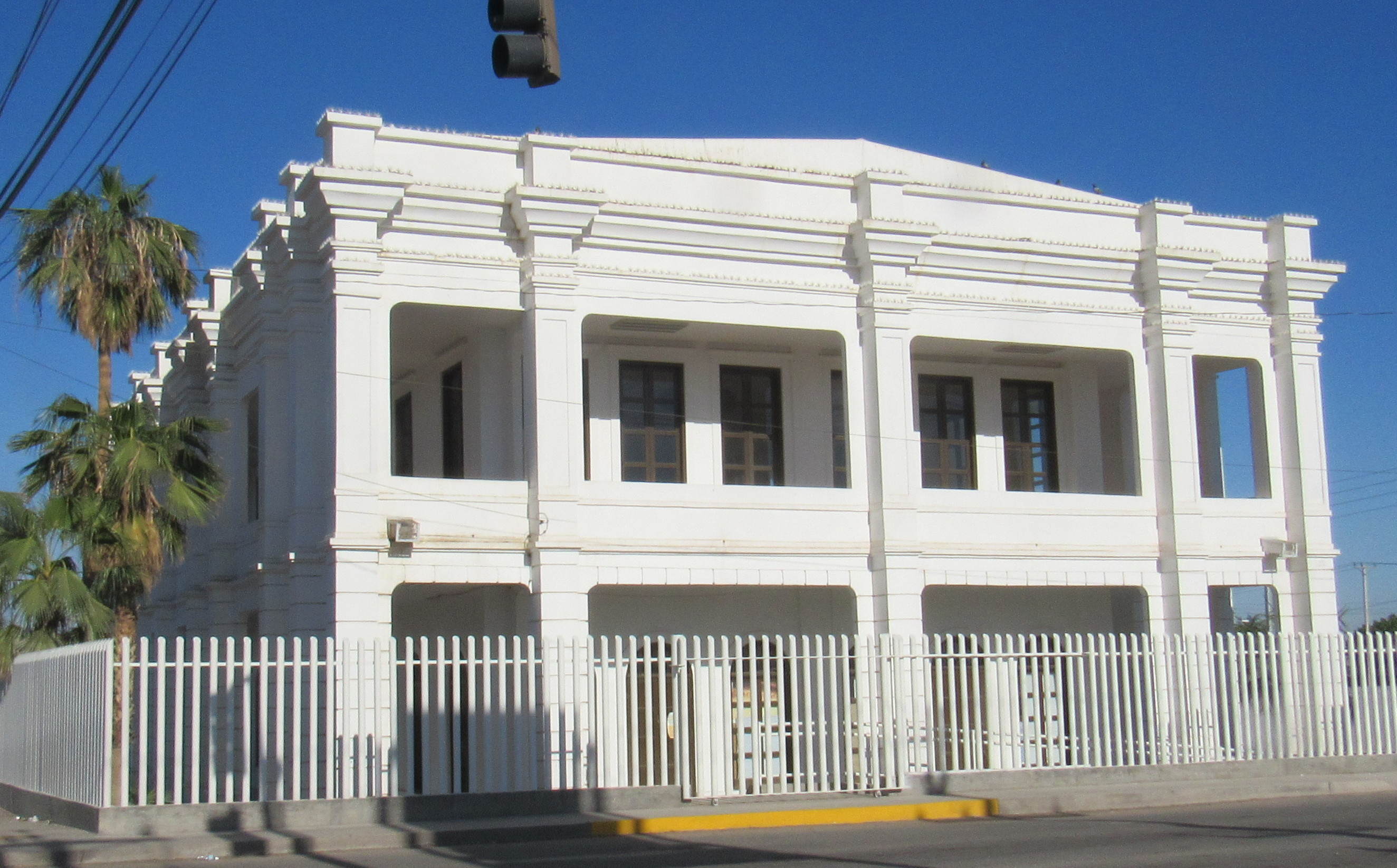
- Casa de Cultura del Progreso

- Location in Mexico Progreso (Mexico)
- Coordinates: 32°35′3″N 115°35′3″W
- Country: Mexico
- State: Baja California
- Municipality: Mexicali
- Elevation: 6 m (20 ft)

Population (2010)
  - Total: 12,557
- Time zone: UTC–08:00 (Zona Noroeste)
  - Summer (DST): UTC–07:00 (DST)

Progreso is a city in Mexicali Municipality, Baja California. Located in the Sonoran Desert, Progreso had a population of 12,557 as of 2010.

Progreso gives its name to one of the western delegations of the municipality.
