= San Lorenzo Marine Archipelago National Park =

National marine park in Baja California, Mexico

Archipiélago de San Lorenzo National Park
- IUCN category II (national park)
- Location within Baja California Location within Mexico
- Location: Isla San Lorenzo, Gulf of California (Sea of Cortez), Mexicali Municipality, Baja California, Mexico
- Nearest city: San Quintín
- Coordinates: 28°46′21″N 112°59′51″W
- Area: 504.42 km^{2}; 124,640 acres (50,442 ha)
- Established: April 25, 2005
- Governing body: Secretariat of the Environment and Natural Resources

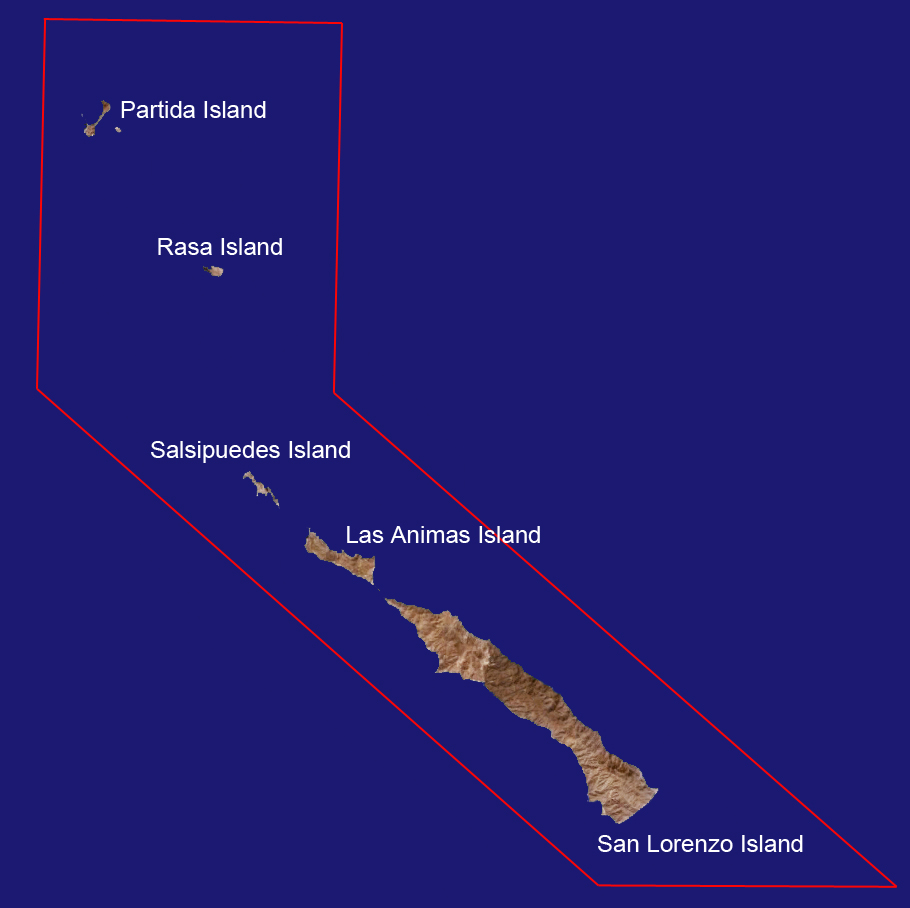

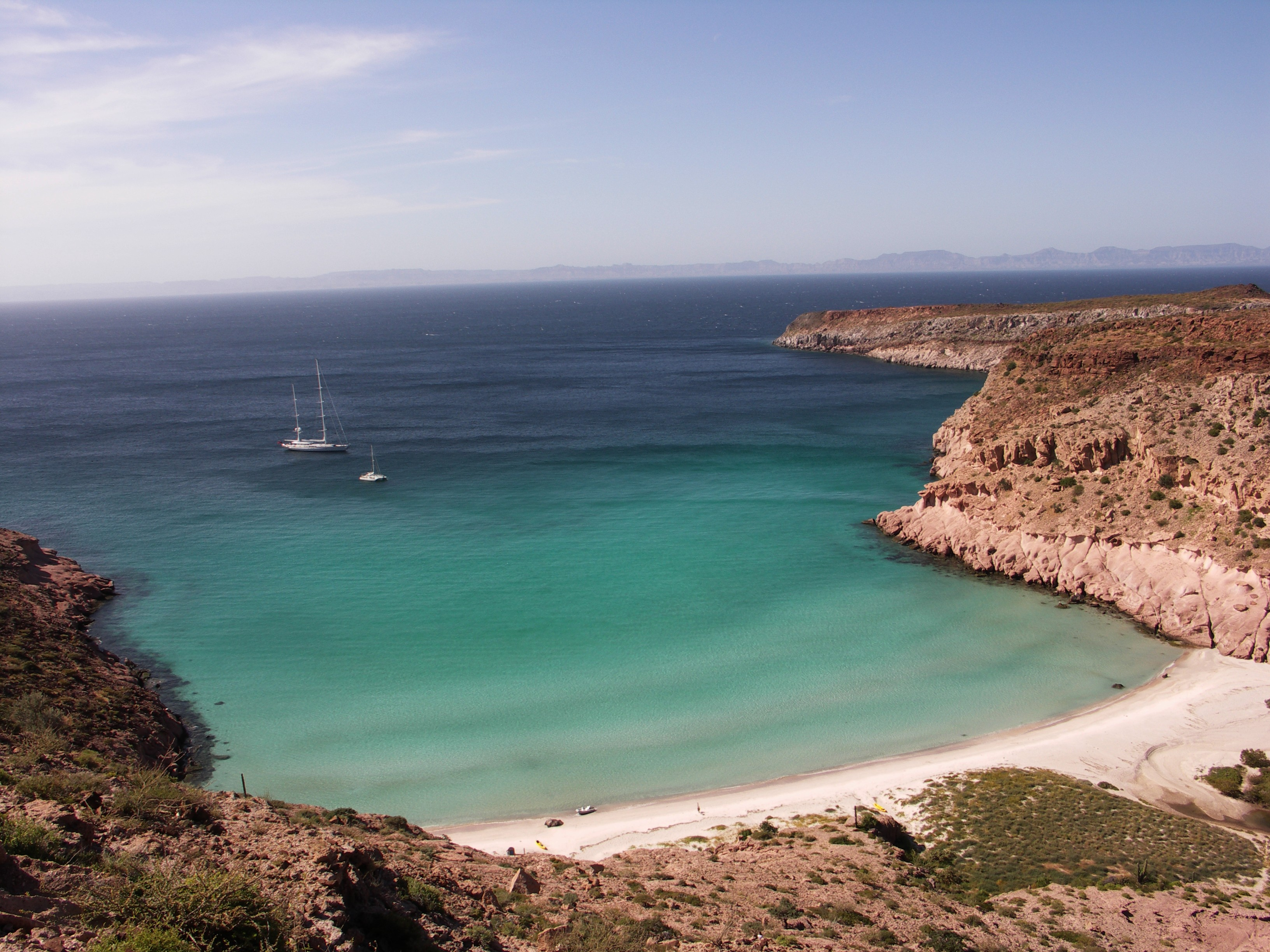
Partida Island

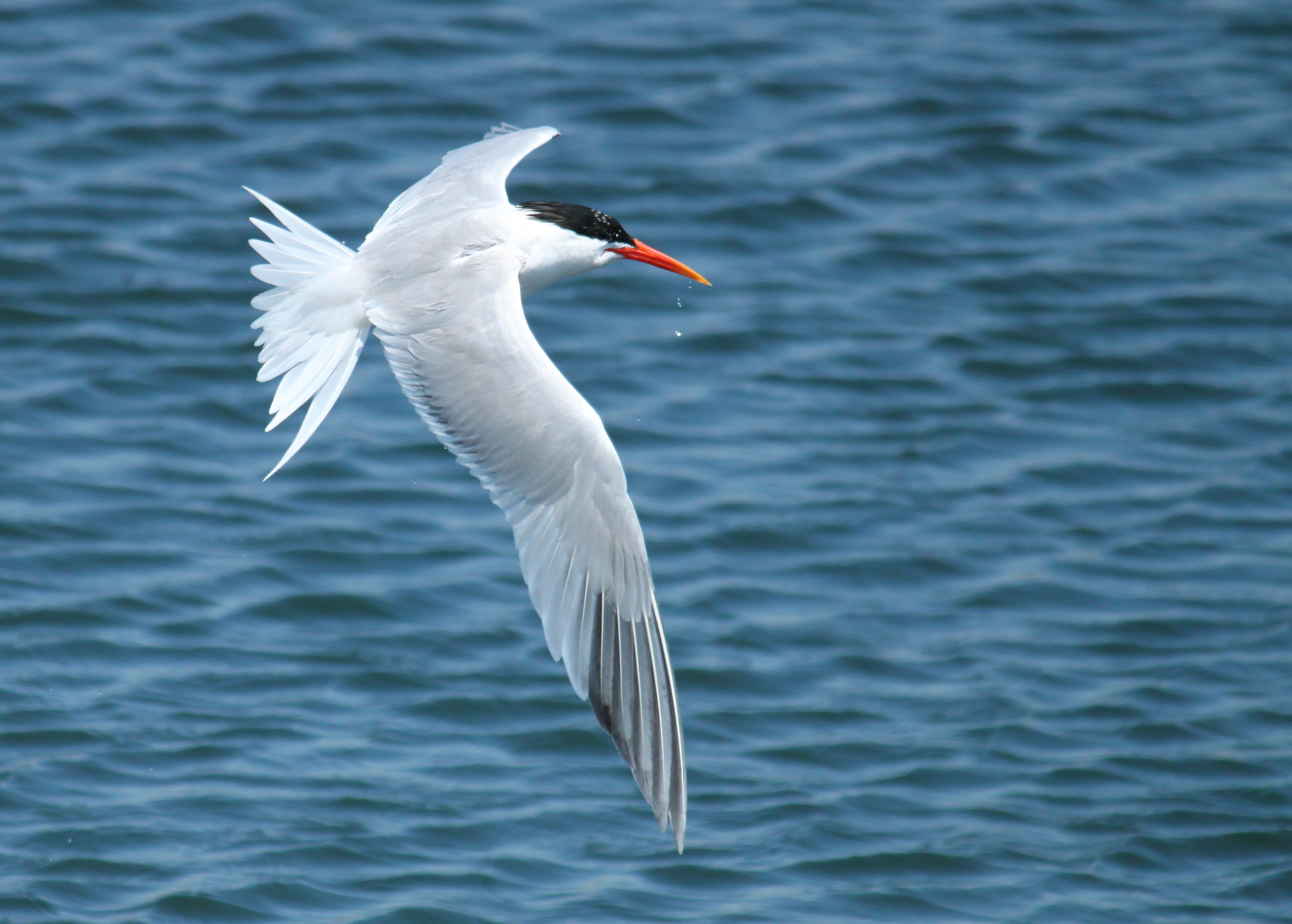
Elegant tern

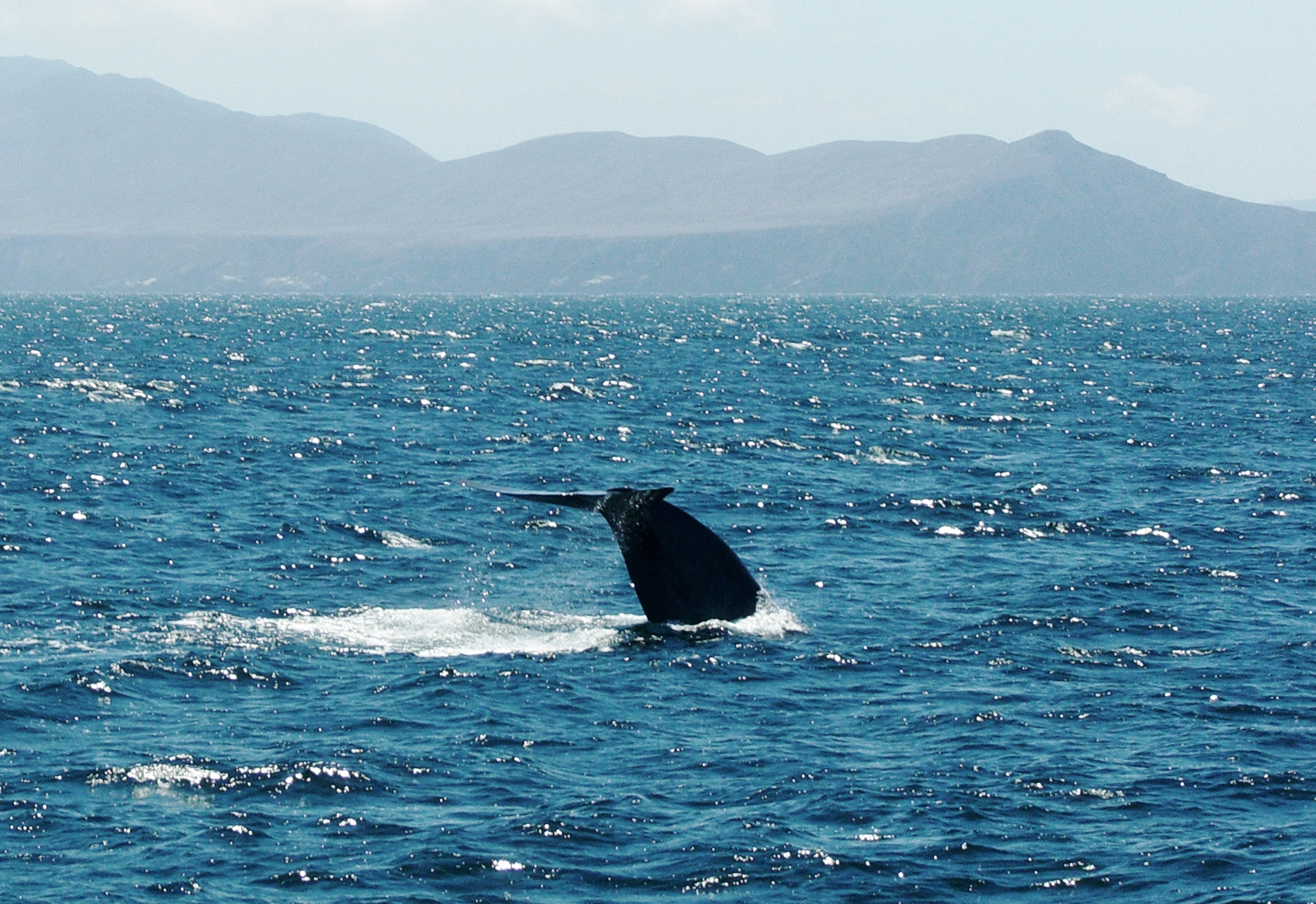
Blue whale

San Lorenzo Marine Archipelago National Park is a national park of Mexico located on San Lorenzo Island part of an archipelago in the Gulf of California off the eastern coast of Baja California. The San Lorenzo Archipelago is considered one of the most important ecological areas of the Gulf of California. The Island and surrounding areas are part of a rich ecosystem comprised by a grand variety of flora and marine fauna. This area is protected by the Mexican federal government Norma Oficial Mexicana NOM-059-SEMARNAT-2001 because of its importance as a habitat for several endangered species. The Archipelago is part of the municipality of Mexicali, Baja California. The island is located southeast of the city separated by the Salsipuedes Channel.

== History ==
Parque Nacional Marino Archipiélago de San Lorenzo was created as a marine national park to protect the fragile and important ecosystem of the San Lorenzo Archipelago by national decree on April 25, 2005. The rich marine biodiversity with a significant number of threatened, vulnerable, and endangered species has made it imperative that the Mexican federal government protect this area. This area is also important as a commercial, cultural, and recreation area.

== Geography ==
The park is comprised by the Archipelago islands of San Lorenzo, Las Animas, Salsipuedes, Rasa, and Partida with the surrounding maritime border of the islands with a total area of 50,442 hectares. The Archipelago islands are surrounded by deep, cold water rich in nutrients in the center part of the Gulf of California also known as the Sea of Cortez. Most of the park is comprised by maritime area. The small terrestrial portion consists of rugged islands with irregular coastline eroded with many sea cliffs. The Archipelago islands exhibit dramatic topological changes where elevation goes from sea level to 485m above sea level. The highest elevations are found on San Lorenzo Island towards the southern end.

== Climate ==
The climate is considered as having dry desert conditions with an estimated annual rainfall of 2.54 in, and an average annual temperature of 75 °F. High levels of solar radiation and constant prevailing winds result in high evaporation rates. The San Lorenzo Archipelago Islands experience hot summers where temperatures during the hottest months of the year (July and August) reach between 95 °F to 104 °F. Winters are warm with average low temperatures reaching 52 °F during the coldest months of the year (January and February). Winds affect the islands' weather, but they have a more significant effect on the sea conditions. Winds prevail from the northwest in the winter which brings nutrient rich waters from the Pacific Ocean into the Gulf of California, but during the summer the winds prevail from the south having the opposite effect on the currents.

== Flora and fauna ==
San Lorenzo Marine Archipelago National Park has unique ecosystems and habitats. These ecosystems support a great nutritional pyramid important to marine animals, birds, and surrounding human settlements. The rich waters of the Gulf of California is home to over 800 species of fish and 2,000 species of invertebrates.

The islands can seem barren due to the lack of fresh water and arid conditions allowing only a few desert shrubs and cactus. The marine flora consists of several varieties of algae. The algae serves as an ideal habitat for small marine species.

The fauna consist of the following list of endangered species: blue whale, humpback whale, killer whale, sperm whale, green turtle, hawksbill turtle, olive ridley turtle, totoaba. The ecosystem of the San Lorenzo Archipelago consists of many varieties of commercially important fish. Swordfish, hake fish, risso dolphin are also common in the waters surrounding the islands. Rasa Island is an important nesting site for Heermann's gull, elegant tern, American oystercatcher, Craveri's murrelet, and brown pelican. Heermann's gull and elegant tern are estimated to reach 260 thousand and 200 thousand respectively which accounts for about 95% of the total world population of that species. Salsipuedes Island, Las Animas Island, and San Lorenzo Island are important reproductive habitat for the brown pelican in the Gulf of California. An average sum of nesting pairs of brown pelicans on the three islands is estimated between 6,000-18,000.

The islands also sustain a great number of bird species consisting of native species and migratory species that are attracted to the rich marine ecosystem. Some of the most observed species of birds include: Cooper's hawk, golden eagle, peregrine falcon, Columbidae, magnificent frigatebird, brown pelican, and Nazca booby.
