= Playas de Rosarito Municipality =

Municipality in the Mexican state of Baja California

- Municipality
- Municipio de Playas de Rosarito
- Coat of arms
- Motto: Un horizonte de posiblidades (A Horizon of Possibilities)
- Location of Playas de Rosarito Municipality in Baja California.
- Coordinates: 32°20′32″N 117°03′22″W
- Country: Mexico
- State: Baja California
- Municipal seat: Rosarito
- Largest city: Rosarito
- Municipality established: June 29, 1995

Government
  - Mayor: Rocio Adame Muñoz

Area
  - Total: 513.32 km^{2} (198.19 sq mi)

Population (2020)
  - Total: 126,890
  - Density: 247.19/km^{2} (640.23/sq mi)
- Data source:
- Time zone: UTC−08:00 (Zona Norteste)
  - Summer (DST): UTC−07:00 (DST)
- Area code: +52 661
- INEGI code: 005
- Website: (in Spanish) Ayuntamiento de Playas de Rosarito

Playas de Rosarito Municipality (Spanish: Municipio de Playas de Rosarito) is located in the northwestern part of the Mexican state of Baja California comprising part of the Tijuana metropolitan area. It lies just south of the city of Tijuana. Its municipal seat is the city of Rosarito. According to the 2020 census, the municipality had a population of 126,890 inhabitants. Its area is 513.32 km^{2} (198.19 sq mi).

== History ==
At the end of the 18th century, Spanish Dominican missionaries and friars gave the name of El Rosario to an indigenous settlement in the area. The town was part of the mission of San Miguel Arcangel de la Frontera, located a few miles to the south. The mission was founded on March 28, 1787 by the Dominican friar Luis Sales on the banks of the San Juan Bautista stream.

Over time, the name of El Rosario became Rosarito. After the Mexican–American War and the 1848 Treaty of Guadalupe Hidalgo, the new Mexican border lay no more than 30 kilometres (19 mi) from Rosarito. This brought the development of the Rancho de la Tia Juana, which eventually grew into the city of Tijuana, the region's development hub.

Playas de Rosarito means "beaches of Rosarito".

== Boroughs ==
- Primo Tapia
- Plan Libertador

== Demographics ==
Historical population
Year	Pop.	±%
2010	90,668	—
2015	96,734	+6.7%
2020	126,890	+31.2%

As of 2020, the municipality had a total population of 126,890.

As of 2010, the city of Playas de Rosarito had a population of 65,278. Other than the city of Playas de Rosarito, the municipality had 358 localities, the largest of which (with 2010 populations in parentheses) were: Ampliación Ejido Plan Libertador (5,906), Primo Tapia (4,921), classified as urban, and Ciudad Morelos (2,040), Colinas del Sol (1,361), and Santa Anita (1,284), classified as rural.

=== Other localities ===
- El Descanso (pop. 567)
- Puerto Nuevo (pop. 135)
- Santa Anita (pop. 1,284)
