= Michoacán de Ocampo, Baja California =

Michoacán de Ocampo
- Town and Municipality
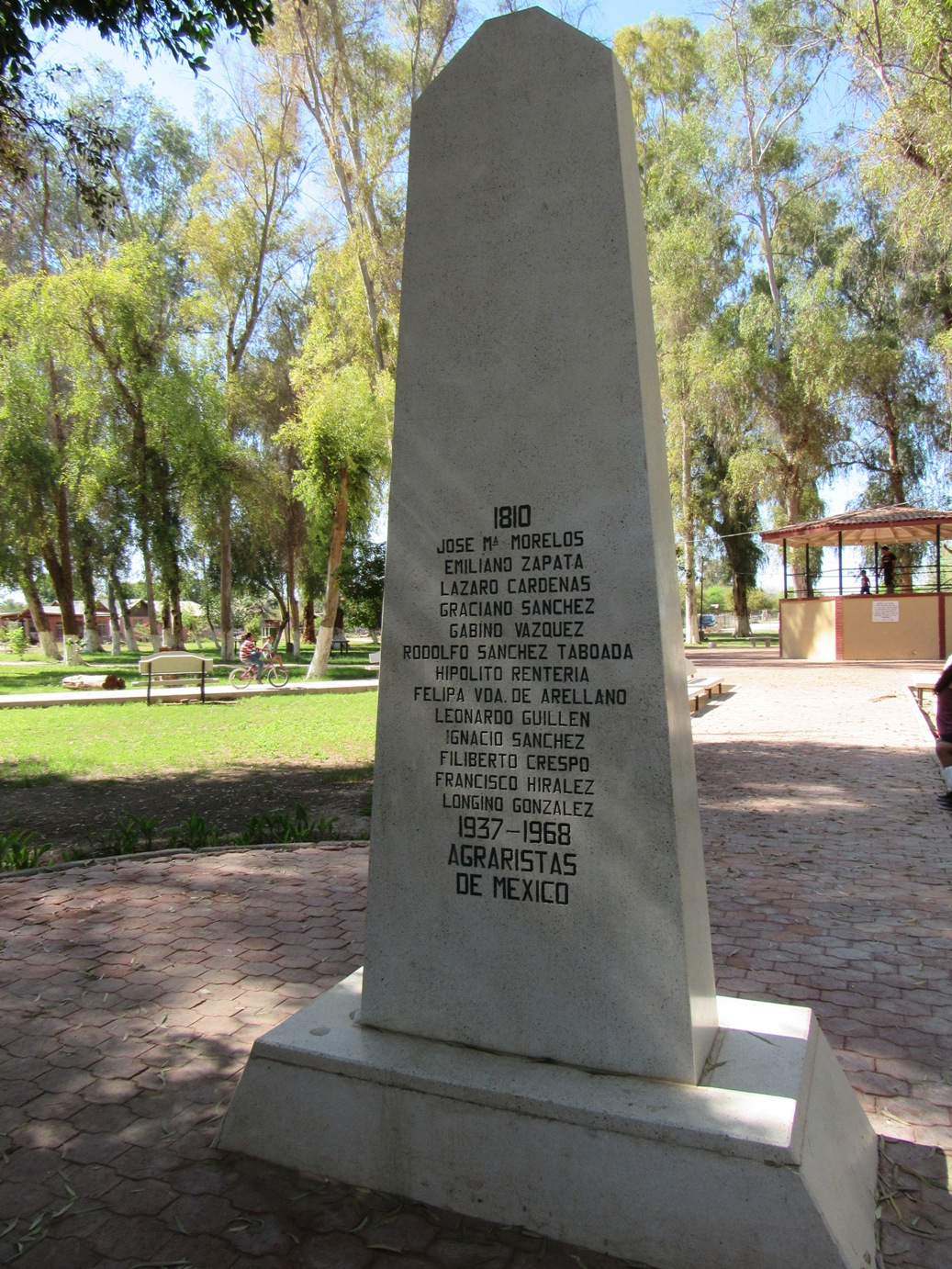
- Monument in the public park

- Location in Mexico
- Coordinates: 32°28′0″N 115°18′31″W
- Country: Mexico
- State: Baja California
- Municipality: Mexicali
- Elevation: 13 m (43 ft)

Population (2010)
  - Total: 3,086
- Time zone: UTC–08:00 (Zona Noroeste)
  - Summer (DST): UTC–07:00 (DST)
- Area code: +52 686

Michoacán de Ocampo is a town in Baja California in Mexicali Municipality, around 14 miles southeast of Mexicali. The town had a population of 3,086 as of 2010. The population of Michoacán de Ocampo has grown by 21 people, about 0.69%, since 2005.
