= Compuertas Borough, Baja California =

Former borough of Mexicali, Mexico

Compuertas is a former borough of Mexicali, located in the northwest of Baja California.

== Geography ==
Compuertas is located in the northeastern part of Mexicali, and adjacent to the Imperial County census-designated place of Calexico, California. The Mexicali downtown is to the west, to the east is the Hechicera borough, and to the south is the borough of González Ortega. The Port of Entry at East Calexico, California is one of the three ports of entry in the Imperial Valley, with the other ports of entry in Calexico (Mexicali downtown) 10 km west and the other 60 km east at Andrade, California (Los Algodones, Baja California).

== History ==
The zone had a few settlements before to be integrated into the city area, the urban zone was populated by moderate income families.

Since the opening of the new port of entry "Garita Nuevo Mexicali", new roads and boulevards transformed this part of the region in Mexicali's "Golden Residential Zone" — and the arrival of higher income families. The zone includes most of the private neighborhoods of the city.
