= Valle de Las Palmas =

Valley in Baja California, Mexico

Coordinates: 32°22′08″N 116°37′04″W

Valle de las Palmas (Palms Valley in Spanish) is located between two hamlets Espuela and Seco in the municipalities of Tijuana and Tecate, Baja California, Mexico. It is the site of a long-term planned urban development which would take advantage of proximity to the existing cities of Tijuana to the north west and Mexicali to the north east to create a similar sized city of one million people by the year 2030, on Mexican Federal Highway 3 around an existing industrial park and university campus Unidad Valle De Las Palmas. The first project in Valle de las Palmas, named Valle San Pedro, is proposed by the Mexican Federal Government, the State of Baja California, Urbi (land developer and homebuilder) and Banobras. It has been certified as the first Integral Sustainable Urban Development or DUIS in Mexico, which establishes criteria in collaboration with Interamerican Development Bank IDB to evaluate projects that will receive inter-secretarial technical support and public investment. The locality reported a population of 1,860 inhabitants in the 2010 federal census. It is located at an altitude of 282 m. (925 ft.) above sea level. Also is an agricultural area with olives and grapes fields, and some farms with cows, pigs and poultry.

== Industrialization direction ==
This can be surmised from the courses of instruction offered by the University as Aerospace, Computers, Microelectronics and Renewable Energy.

== Transport ==
Valle de Las Palmas is on Mexican Federal Highway 3 running north from Ensenada, Baja California and is south of the city of Tecate which city is on a spur of the toll road linking Tijuana with Mexicali across the central Sierra. It is also on the older two-lane east-west road which is toll-free.

== Air travel ==
The city of Tecate is home for the Tecate Airport, which no longer operates due to low traffic. As the development of Valle Las Palmas occurs it will cause increased traffic causing the Tecate airport to reopen. Instead, Tecate municipio residents are served by the nearby Tijuana International Airport, closer to Tecate than Mexicali International Airport, used to a lesser extent.
