= Urbi =

Home development firm

Urbi Desarrollos Urbanos, S.A.B. de C.V.
- Company type: Sociedad Anónima Bursátil de Capital Variable
- Traded as: BMV: URBI
- Industry: Construction & Real Estate
- Founded: 1981; 45 years ago
- Headquarters: Col. Nueva, Mexicali, BC, Mexico
- Key people: Netzahualcóyotl Pérez Román (Chairman); Cuauhtemoc Pérez Román (CEO)
- Products: Home builder
- Revenue: ▼US$ 826.3 million (2012)
- Net income: ▼US$ 96.6 million (2012)
- Number of employees: 2,100 (as of 1Q13)
- Website: www.urbi.com

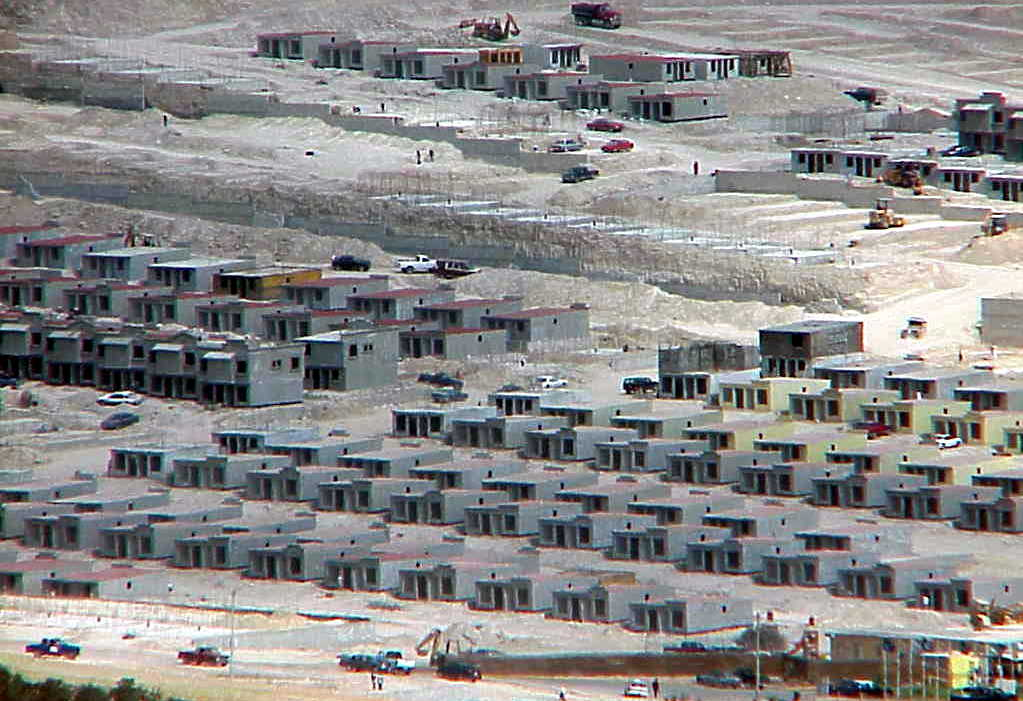
Urbi mass housing construction near Tijuana, Mexico.

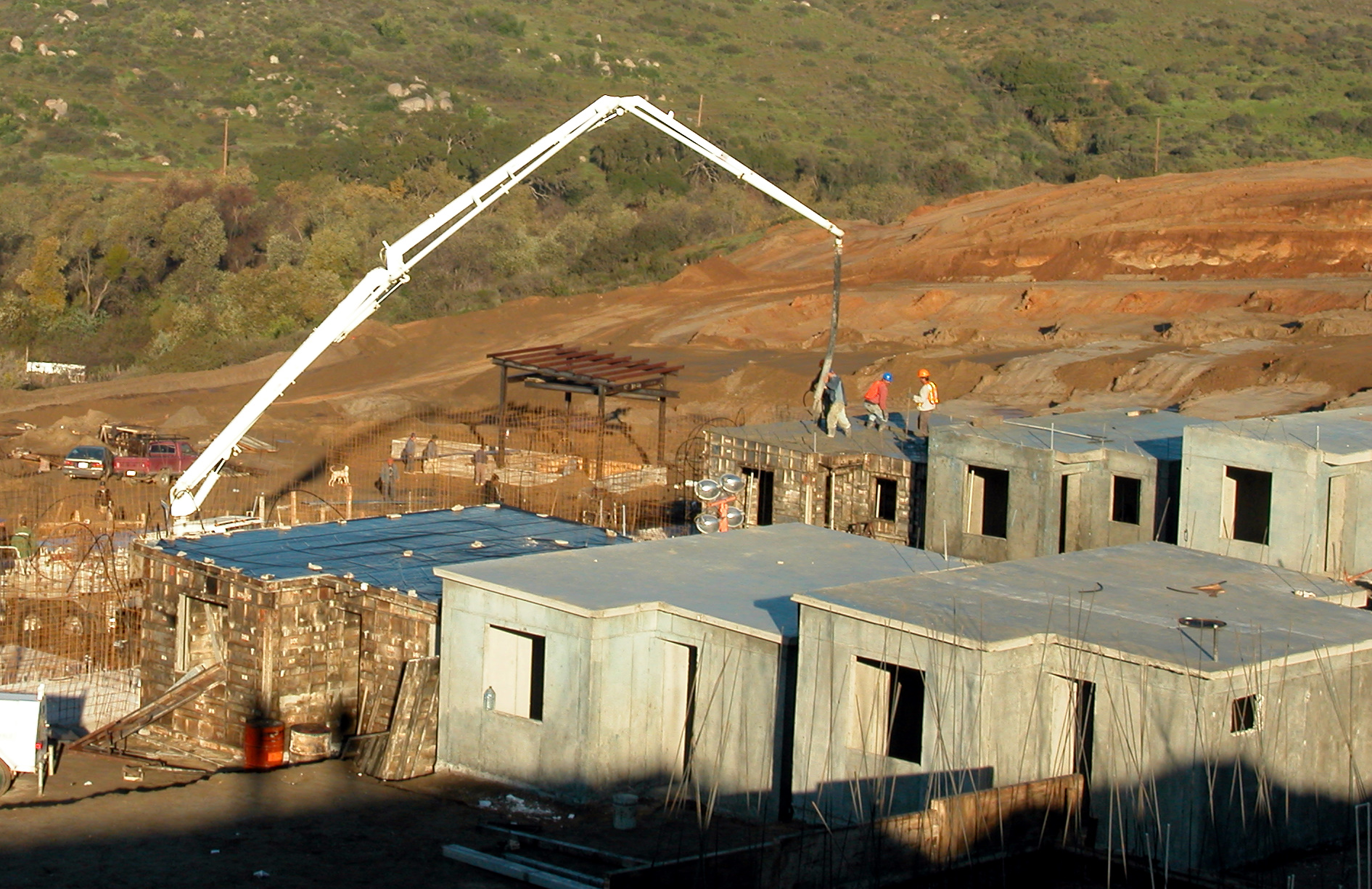
Mass housing construction by Urbi of Mexico.

Urbi, incorporated in 1981, is a home developer based in Mexico, with its headquarters located in the Northwestern city and the capital of the state of Baja California, Mexicali. The company has presences in the Northern states of Mexico, as well as the metropolitan areas of Mexico City, Guadalajara and Monterrey. It has been public since 2004, and its stock trades on the Bolsa Mexicana de Valores.

Urbi develops housing for residential markets in Mexico. The company, as of 2013, had built and sold more than 430,000 homes in Mexico.

The company has invested in the development of sustainable communities. In 2002 it won the National Housing Award for a model development in the State of Mexico and in 2009 its macro-development in the Valle de las Palmas area of Tijuana, Valle San Pedro, became the first in Mexico to be certified with the DUIS or Integral Sustainable Urban Development Certification.

== History ==
In 1981 Urbis was formed by a group of young entrepreneurs who raised US$70,000 to start the company.

The first projects were developments of 211 and 204 homes. Urbi grew to become one of Mexico's biggest homebuilders, with a presence, as of 2013, in 30 cities, including the metropolitan areas of Mexico City, Monterrey and Guadalajara.

The company caters mainly to the low income market segment.

=== Bankruptcy ===
In December 2014, Urbi filed for bankruptcy protection to restructure its debt with a plan to give its creditors a majority stake in the company. The company, had already had its shares suspended for more than a year at that point, and foresaw issuing new shares representing 97.5 percent of Urbi's capital. The bulk of the shares would be exchanged for debt, as well as for five and ten year bonds.
