= Santa Isabel, Baja California =

City in Baja California, Mexico

- City
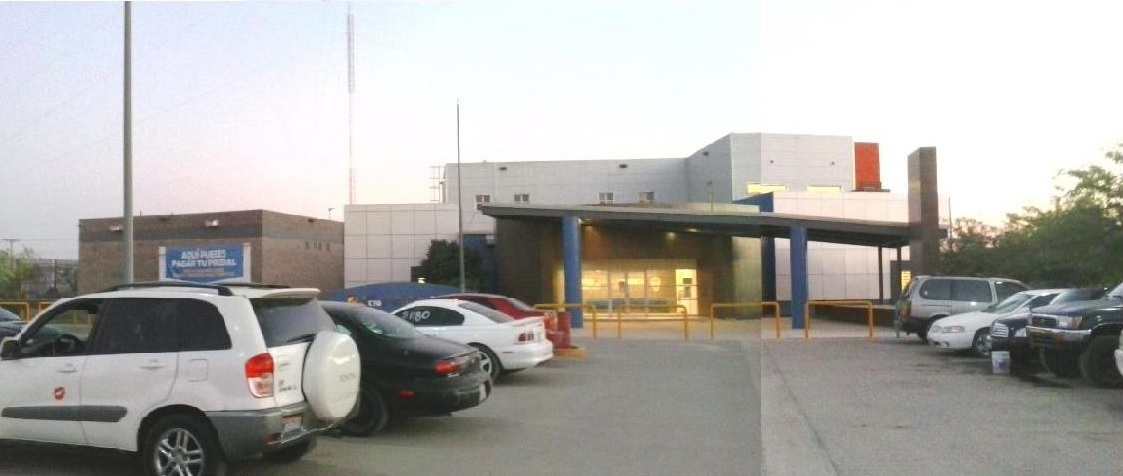

- Location in Mexico
- Coordinates: 32°37′53″N 115°34′32″W
- Country: Mexico
- State: Baja California
- Municipality: Mexicali

Population (2016)
  - Total: 40,059
- Time zone: UTC–08:00 (Zona Noroeste)
  - Summer (DST): UTC–07:00 (DST)

Santa Isabel (Spanish for "St. Elizabeth of Portugal") is a city in Mexicali Municipality, Baja California. The city had a population of 33,604 as of 2018. Located just south of the US-Mexico border, Santa Isabel is a part of the Calexico–Mexicali metropolitan area.

== Economy ==
The city is the location of Silicon Border.

== Demographics ==
Historical population
Year	Pop.	±%
1995	15,839	—
2000	18,041	+13.9%
2005	22,007	+22.0%
2010	29,311	+33.2%
2018	33,604	+14.6%

== See also ==
- Mexicali
