= Francisco Rueda Gómez =

Mexican politician

- Born: 22 November 1964 (age 61); Tijuana, Baja California, Mexico
- Occupation: Politician
- Political party: PAN

Francisco Rueda Gómez (born 22 November 1964) is a Mexican politician affiliated with the National Action Party (PAN). In the 2006 election he was elected to the Chamber of Deputies for the 60th session of Congress, representing Baja California's first district.
