= Unidad Valle de las Palmas =

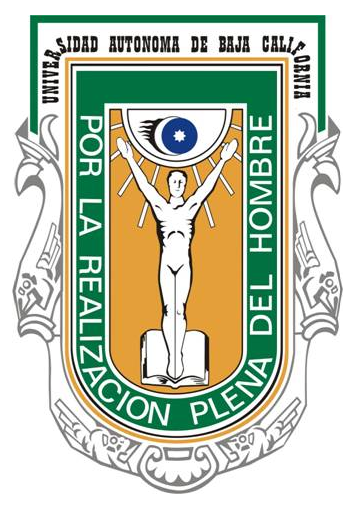
Unidad Valle De Las Palmas

Unidad Valle de las Palmas is a formal extension of the Autonomous University of Baja California, belonging to the Campus Vicerectorship of Tijuana, located on the Tijuana-Tecate highway, near the height of the Carrizo Dam. In 2009, the academic unit will have new educational offerings in Health Sciences (Nursing, Medicine and Dentistry), Design (Architecture, Graphic Design and Industrial Design), and Engineering Sciences (Aerospace Engineering, Semiconductor Engineering, Microelectronics, Computer Engineering, and Renewable Energy).

The first phase of the Valle de las Palmas campus facility of the Autonomous University of Baja California (UABC) will be ready for the first group in August 2009, according to the rector Gabriel Estrella Valenzuela. During the startup of the work—which includes the construction of the first four buildings of classrooms and laboratories, as well as the community center and two parking areas, among other venues—it was announced that would respond to an enrollment of 4 thousand students in two shifts. This used 30 of the 50 hectares of land that was donated by the State Government, with an initial investment of 160 million pesos. The start of work was led by Rector Estrella and Governor Jose Guadalupe Osuna Millan, who was accompanied by the mayors of Tijuana and Tecate (Jorge Ramos and Aldo Peñalosa, respectively), as well as by state and municipal officials.

== Sources ==
- es:Wikipedia:Unidad Valle De Las Palmas
- Valle De Las Palmas Campus of UABC opens
