= Mexicali Municipality =

Municipality in the Mexican state of Baja California

Coordinates: 31°45′N 115°15′W

Mexicali Municipality Municipio de Mexicali
- Municipality
- Flag Coat of arms
- Motto(s): Tierra Cálida (Warm Land)
- Location of Mexicali in Baja California.
- Country: Mexico
- State: Baja California
- Municipal seat: Mexicali
- Largest city: Mexicali
- Municipality established: 29 December 1953

Government
  - Municipal president: Norma Alicia Bustamante Martínez (MORENA)

Area
  - Total: 13,700 km^{2} (5,300 sq mi)

Population (2020)
  - Total: 1,049,792
  - Density: 76.6/km^{2} (198/sq mi)
- Data source:
- Time zone: UTC−08:00 (Zona Noroeste)
  - Summer (DST): UTC−07:00 (DST)
- Area code: +52 686/658
- INEGI code: 002
- Website: (in Spanish) Ayuntamiento de Mexicali

Mexicali Municipality is a municipality (Spanish: municipio) in the Mexican state of Baja California. Its municipal seat (Spanish: cabecera municipal) is located in the city of Mexicali. As of 2020, the municipality had a total population of 1,049,792. The municipality has an area of 13,700 km^{2} (5,300 sq mi). This includes many smaller outlying communities as well as the city of Mexicali. Also, the islands of Baja California located in the Gulf of California are part of the municipality, among them the mudflat islands at the mouth of the Colorado River (the largest one being Montague Island), Isla Ángel de la Guarda and the islands of San Lorenzo Marine Archipelago National Park. Mexicali is the northernmost municipality of Baja California, Mexico, and Latin America.

The city of Mexicali was founded in 1903, and its name is a portmanteau of Mexico and California, as is the name of Calexico, California across the border.

== Industry ==
Mexicali has more than 180 maquiladoras, and the rapid growth of the city has outstripped the capacity of its sewage system.

== Infrastructure ==
Mexico and the United States spent $91 million upgrading Mexicali's sewers in recent decades, but funding has dropped in the 2010s.

Las Arenitas wastewater plant opened in 2007 south of Mexicali, greatly improving water quality, particularly bacteria levels. However the overburdened sewer system began periodically dumping raw sewage into the river, resulting in spikes in bacterial levels.

In 2016 the Mexicali Public Service Commission took over regulation of wastewater discharge from the Environmental Protection Department of the state of Baja California, increasing oversight.

In 2009 California Governor Arnold Schwarzenegger signed a bill creating the New River Improvement Project. Funding was approved in 2016 for a scaled-down project that would encase the river in a pipe underground and reroute it away from Calexico.

== Boroughs ==
The municipality of Mexicali is divided into 14 administrative boroughs (Spanish: delegaciones) of which the city of Mexicali occupies three beside the city proper area; all boroughs are in turn divided into colonias or ejidos. These boroughs offer administrative services such as urban planning, civil registry, inspection, verification, public works and community development and are served by a delegado.

The boroughs of Mexicali Municipality city are:

1. Los Algodones, located in the Valley Zone.
2. Batáquez, located in the Valley Zone.
3. Cerro Prieto, located in the Urban Zone, is part of the Mexicali metropolitan area.
4. Venustiano Carranza, located in the Valley Zone.
5. Ciudad Morelos, informally known as Cuervos, located in the Valley Zone.
6. Colonias Nuevas, informally known as Km 57, located in the Valley Zone.
7. Progreso, located in the Urban Zone, is part of the Mexicali metropolitan area.
8. Ejido Hermosillo, located in the Valley Zone.
9. Estación Delta, located in the Valley Zone.
10. Guadalupe Victoria, informally known as Km 43, located in the Valley Zone.
11. González Ortega, informally known as Palaco, located in the Urban Zone, is part of the Mexicali metropolitan area.
12. Hechicera, located in the Valley Zone.
13. Benito Juárez, informally known as Tecolotes, located in the Valley Zone.

The former borough (delegación) of Compuertas is located in the eastern part of the city of Mexicali.

== Cities and towns ==
Main localities

Historical population
Year	Pop.	±%
2010	936,826	—
2015	988,417	+5.5%
2020	1,049,792	+6.2%

As of 2020, the municipality of Mexicali had a population of 1,049,792. Other than the city of Mexicali, the municipality had 2,553 localities, the largest of which (with 2010 populations in parentheses) were: Santa Isabel (29,311), Ciudad Guadalupe Victoria (Kilómetro Cuarenta y Tres) (17,119), San Felipe (16,702), Puebla (15,168), Progreso (12,557), Ciudad Morelos (Cuervos) (8,243), Colonia Venustiano Carranza (La Carranza) (6,098), Ciudad Coahuila (Kilómetro Cincuenta y Siete) (5,617), Vicente Guerrero (Algodones) (5,474), Delta (Estación Delta) (5,180), EJido Hermosillo (5,101), Benito Juárez (Ejido Tecolotes) (4,167), Batáquez (3,758), Nuevo León (3,655), Poblado Paredones (3,332), Michoacán de Ocampo (3,086), Ejido Hechicera (2,517), Viñas del Sol (2,509), Ejido Sinaloa (Estación Kasey) (2,505), classified as urban, and Ejido Lázaro Cárdenas (La Mosca) (2,463), Poblado Lázaro Cárdenas (La Veintiocho) (2,388), Ejido Quintana Roo (2,311), Islas Agrarias Grupo A (1,979), Ejido Jiquilpan (1,681), Ejido Plan de Ayala (1,654), Ejido Yucatán (1,628), Ejido Durango (1,593), Ejido Saltillo (1,560), Ejido Pátzcuaro (1,513), Ejido Sonora (1,507), Nayarit Llamada (1,486), Ejido Vicente Guerrero (1,463), Ejido Veracruz Dos (1,446), Ejido Colima 1 (1,379), Colonia José María Rodríguez Mérida (La Panga) (1,275), Rincones del Puebla (1,175), Ejido Netzahualcóyotl (1,064), Ejido Toluca (1,060), Islas Agrarias Grupo B (1,054), Estación Pescaderos (Kilómetro Treinta y Nueve) (1,051), Ejido Tabasco (1,029), Veracruz Uno (1,023), and Ejido Doctor Alberto Oviedo Mota (El Indiviso) (1,009), classified as rural.

== Adjacent municipalities and counties ==
- San Luis Río Colorado Municipality, Sonora – east
- Ensenada Municipality – southwest
- Tecate Municipality – west
- Imperial County, California – north
- Yuma County, Arizona – northeast
- San Felipe Municipality, Baja California - south

== See also ==
- Municipalities of Baja California
- Baja California
- Calexico, California
- New River (Mexico–United States)

== Sources ==
- (in Spanish) Link to tables of population data from the 2005 Census, INEGI: Instituto Nacional de Estadística, Geografía e Informática.
- (in Spanish) Mexicali, Enciclopedia de los Municipios de México, Instituto Nacional Para el Federalismo y el Desarrollo Municipal, SEGOB. Accessed on line 15 November 2007.
- (in Spanish) Ubicación Geográfica, Mexicali government web site. Describes subdivisions of Mexicali.
