= Tecate Municipality =

Municipality in the Mexican state of Baja California

Tecate Municipality Municipio de Tecate
- Municipality
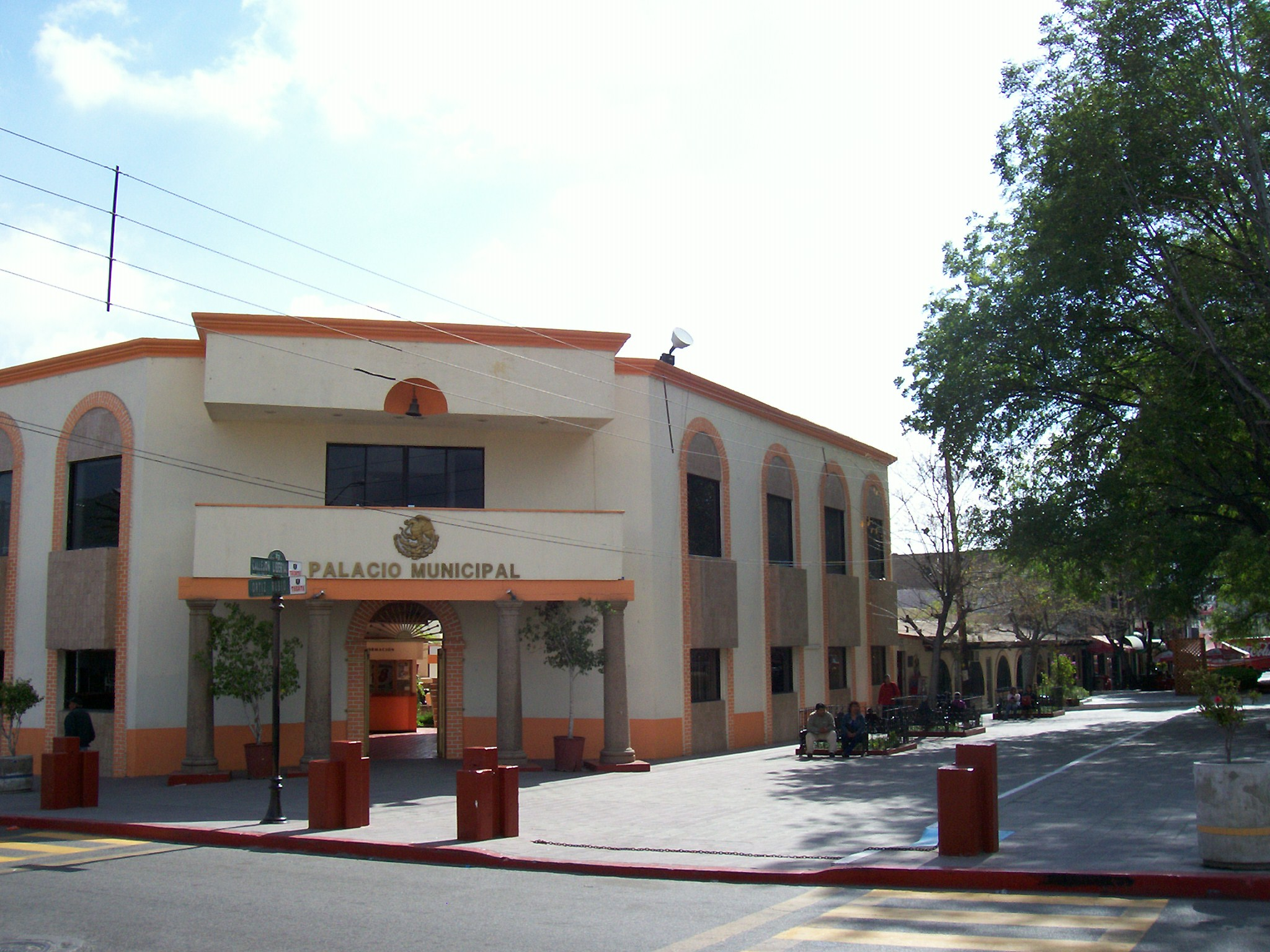
- Town hall

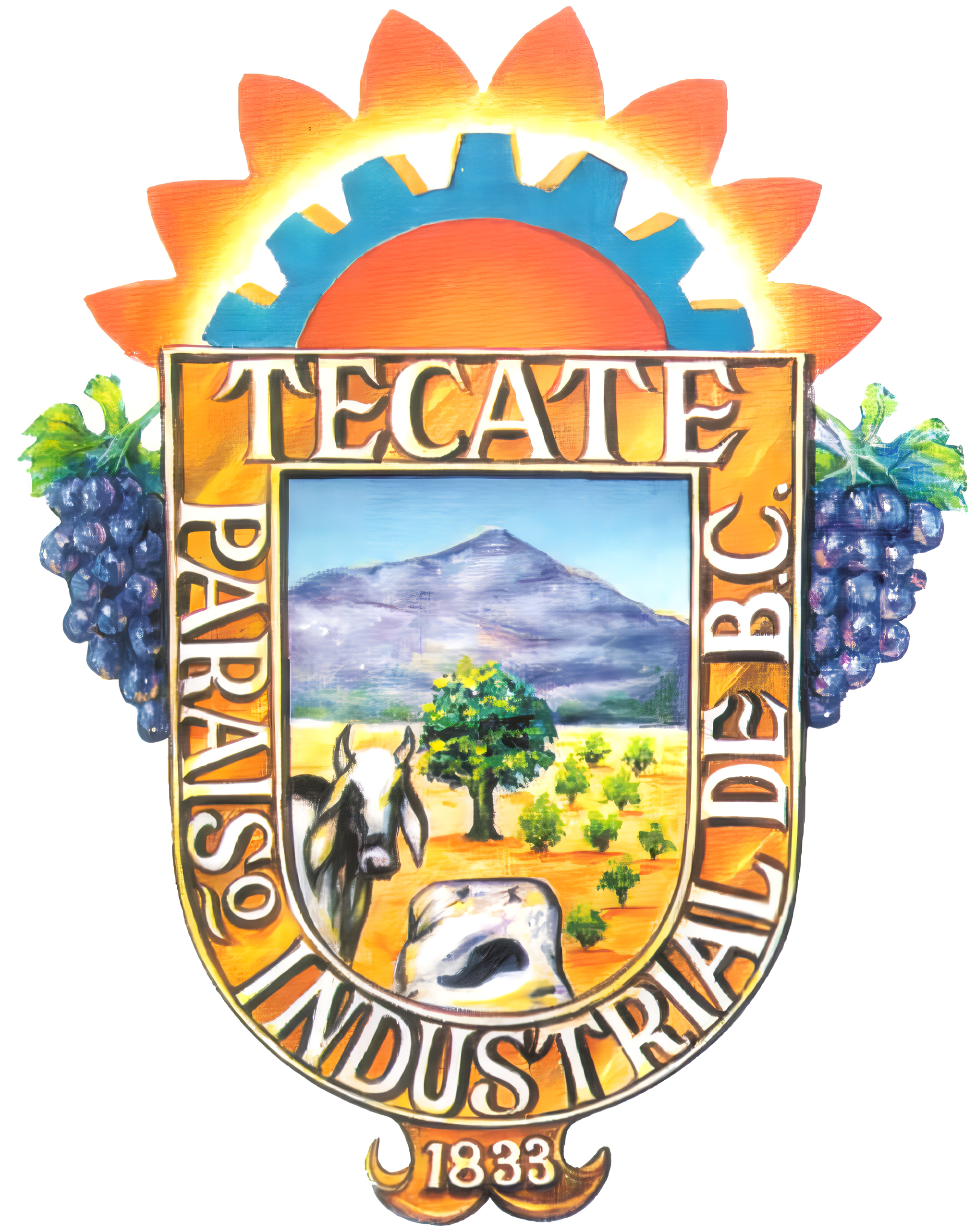
- Coat of arms
- Motto: Paraíso Industrial de B.C. (Baja California's Industrial Paradise)
- Location of Tecate in Baja California.
- Coordinates: 32°34′N 116°38′W
- Country: Mexico
- State: Baja California
- Municipal seat: Tecate
- Largest city: Tecate
- Municipality established: December 29, 1953

Government
  - Municipal president: Román Cota Muñoz (MORENA)

Area
  - Total: 3,079.0 km^{2} (1,188.8 sq mi)

Population (2020)
  - Total: 108,440
  - Density: 35.219/km^{2} (91.217/sq mi)
- Data source:
- Time zone: UTC−08:00 (Zona Noroeste)
  - Summer (DST): UTC−07:00 (DST)
- Area code: +52 665/686
- INEGI code: 003
- Website: (in Spanish) Gobierno Municipal de Tecate, Baja California

Tecate is a municipality in the Mexican state of Baja California. Its municipal seat is located in the city of Tecate. According to the 2020 census, it had a population of 108,440 inhabitants. The municipality has an area of 3,079.0 km^{2} (1,188.8 sq mi).

== Boroughs ==
The municipality is administratively subdivided into 6 boroughs, in addition to the municipal seat, Tecate.

- Nueva Colonia Hindú
- Colonia Luis Echeverría
- Heroes del Desierto
- Mi Ranchito
- Valle de Las Palmas
- La Rumorosa

== Demographics ==
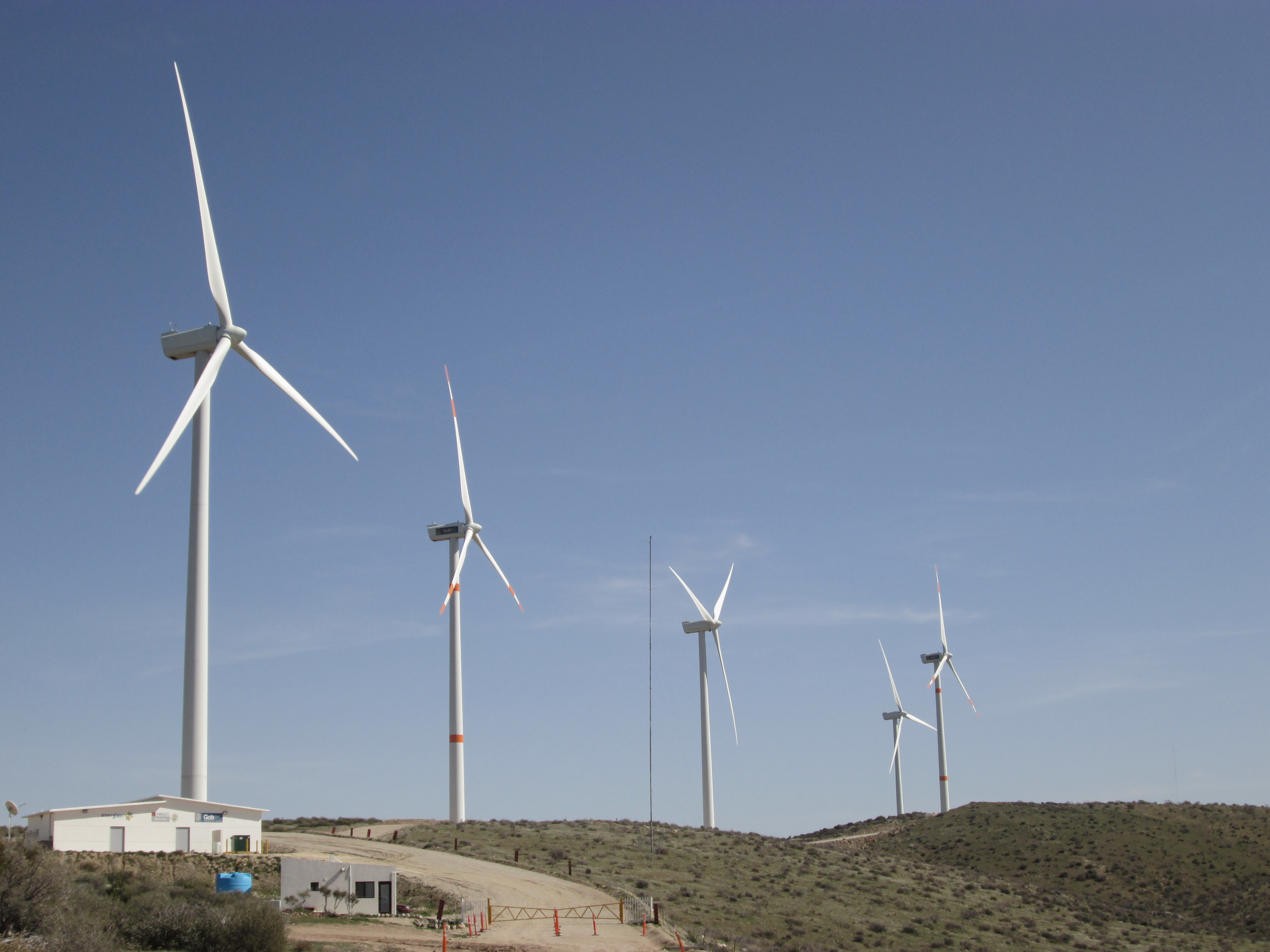
Wind farm in La Rumorosa.

Historical population
Year	Pop.	±%
2010	101,079	—
2015	102,406	+1.3%
2020	108,440	+5.9%

As of 2020, the municipality had a total population of 108,440.

As of 2010, the city of Tecate had a population of 64,764. Other than the city of Tecate, the municipality had 964 localities, the largest of which (with 2010 populations in parentheses) were: Lomas de Santa Anita (6,604), Nueva Colonia Hindú (4,431), classified as urban, and Cereso del Hongo (4,278), Luis Echeverría Álvarez (El Hongo) (2,411), classified as urban, and Hacienda Tecate (1,871), Valle de las Palmas (1,860), La Rumorosa (1,836), Maclovio Herrera (Colonia Aviación) (1,219), Alfonso Garzón (Granjas Familiares) (1,188), and El Mirador (1,171), classified as rural.

== Adjacent municipalities and counties ==
- Mexicali Municipality – east
- Ensenada Municipality – south
- Tijuana Municipality – west
- San Diego County, California – north
- Imperial County, California – northeast
