= Guadalupe Victoria, Baja California =

City in Baja California, Mexico

Coordinates: 32°17′39″N 115°06′16″W

Guadalupe Victoria, also known as the 43, is a small city in the state of Baja California in northern Mexico. Its population at the 2018 census was 20,222 inhabitants. It is located in the municipality of Mexicali and serves as a borough seat of its surrounding area.

Economically, it serves as an agricultural hub supplying the numerous cotton and wheat farms and ranches in the surrounding area

Its name honors the first president of Mexico, Guadalupe Victoria. Other names by which it is known locally include Estación Victoria and "el cuarenta y tres" (the 43) These latter two names are due to the town's location on kilometer 43 on the former Ferrocarril Sonora-Baja California railroad, today a line of Ferromex, connecting Mexicali and the border with Benjamin Hill, Sonora and Guadalajara.

The city includes a sub-campus of the Universidad Autónoma de Baja California.

It is located near the epicenter of the 2010 Baja California earthquake.
