= Municipalities of Baja California =

List of municipalities of Mexican state

Map of Mexico with Baja California highlighted

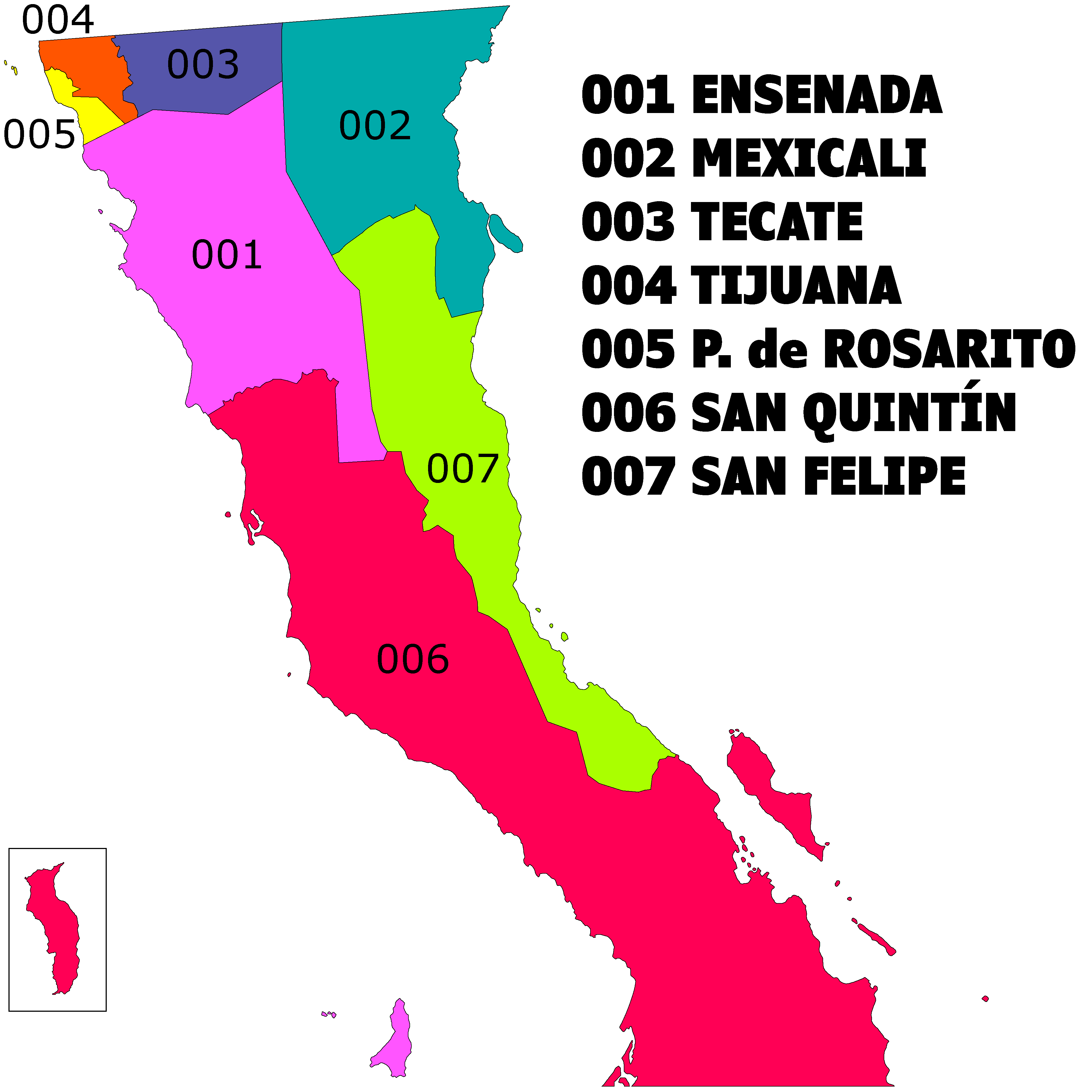
Municipalities of Baja California since 2022.

Baja California is a state in northwest Mexico that is divided into seven municipalities. According to the 2020 INEGI census, Baja California is the 13th most populous state with 3,769,020 inhabitants and the 12th largest by land area spanning 73,290.08 square kilometres (28,297.46 sq mi).

Municipalities in Baja California are administratively autonomous of the state according to the 115th article of the 1917 Constitution of Mexico. Their legal framework derives from Title VI of the state Constitution and the state's 2001 Law of the Municipal Regime. Every three years, citizens elect a municipal president (Spanish: presidente municipal) by a plurality voting system who heads a concurrently elected municipal council (ayuntamiento) responsible for providing public services for their constituents. The municipal council consists of a variable number of trustees and councillors (regidores y síndicos) who govern from the municipal seat. Municipalities are responsible for public services (such as water and sewerage), street lighting, public safety, traffic, and the maintenance of public parks, gardens and cemeteries. They may also assist the state and federal governments in education, emergency fire and medical services, environmental protection and maintenance of monuments and historical landmarks. Since 1984, they have had the power to collect property taxes and user fees, although more funds are obtained from the state and federal governments than from their own income. Municipalities may establish functional and geographical subdivisions called delegaciones and subdelegaciones in accordance with Article 29 of the Law of the Municipal Regime.

The largest municipality by population in Baja California and in Mexico is Tijuana with 1,922,523 residents, representing around half (51%) of the population of the state. The smallest municipality by population is San Felipe: the areas which now make up San Felipe recorded a population of 18,369 inhabitants in the 2010 Mexican Census. San Quintín, which spans 32,883.93 km^{2} (12,696.56 sq mi), is the largest municipality by area in the state and in the country. Playas de Rosarito is the smallest municipality by area spanning 500.67 km^{2} (193.31 sq mi). The first municipality to incorporate was Ensenada on May 15, 1882, and the newest municipality is San Felipe which was formed from Ensenada and Mexicali on January 1, 2022.

== Municipalities ==
Municipalities in Baja California

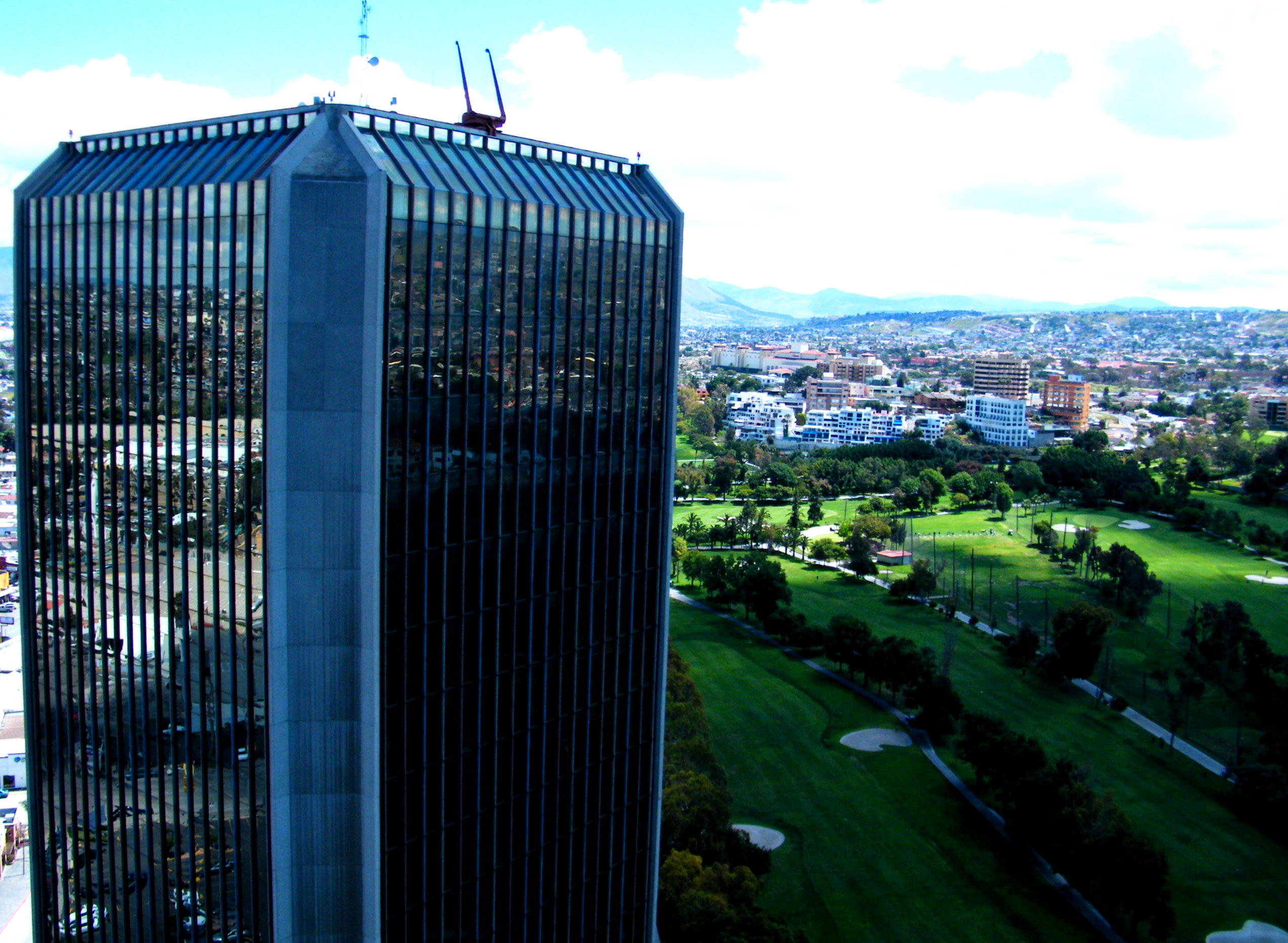
Tijuana, Baja California's most populous municipality

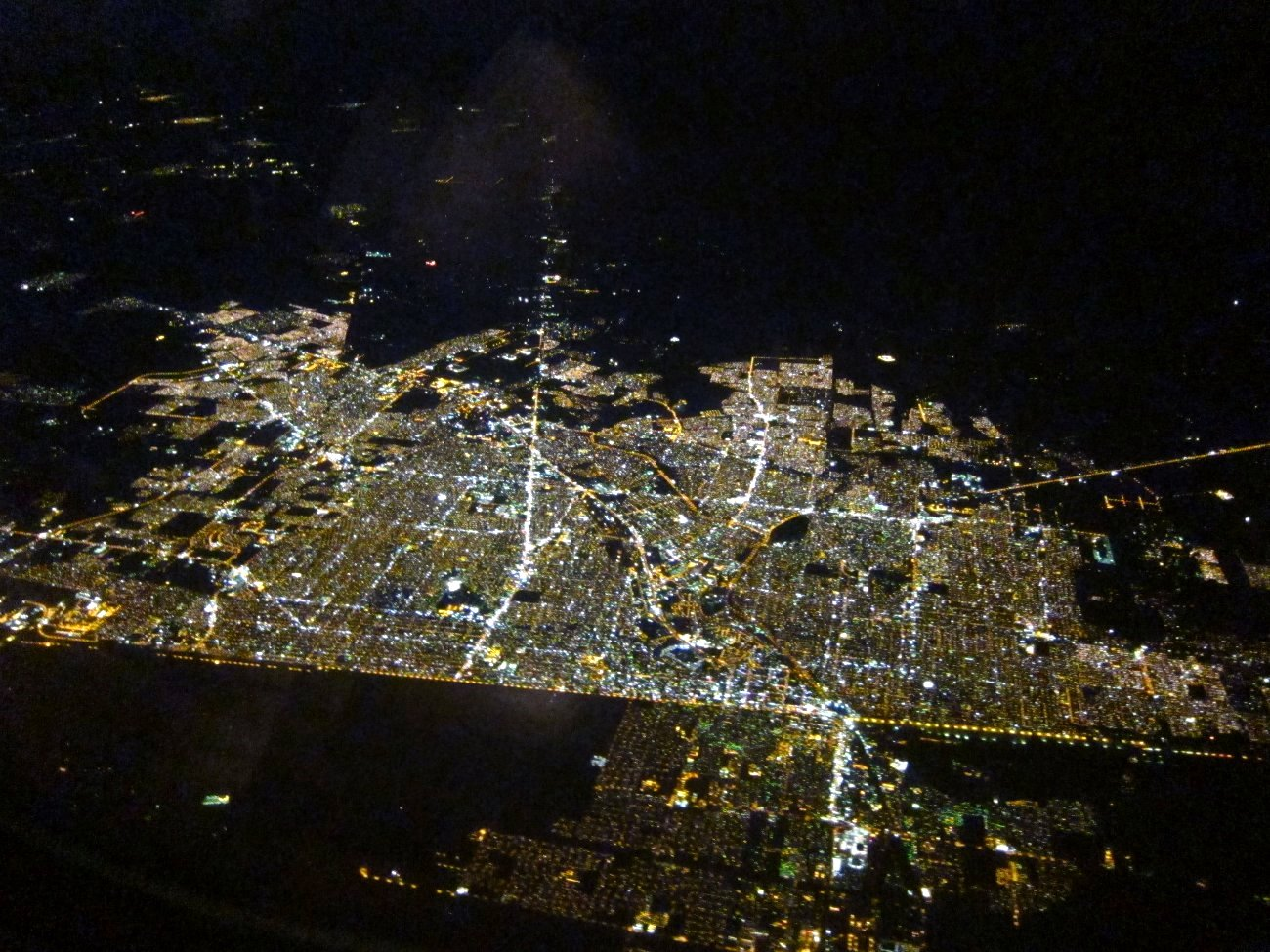
Mexicali, state capital and second largest municipality by population

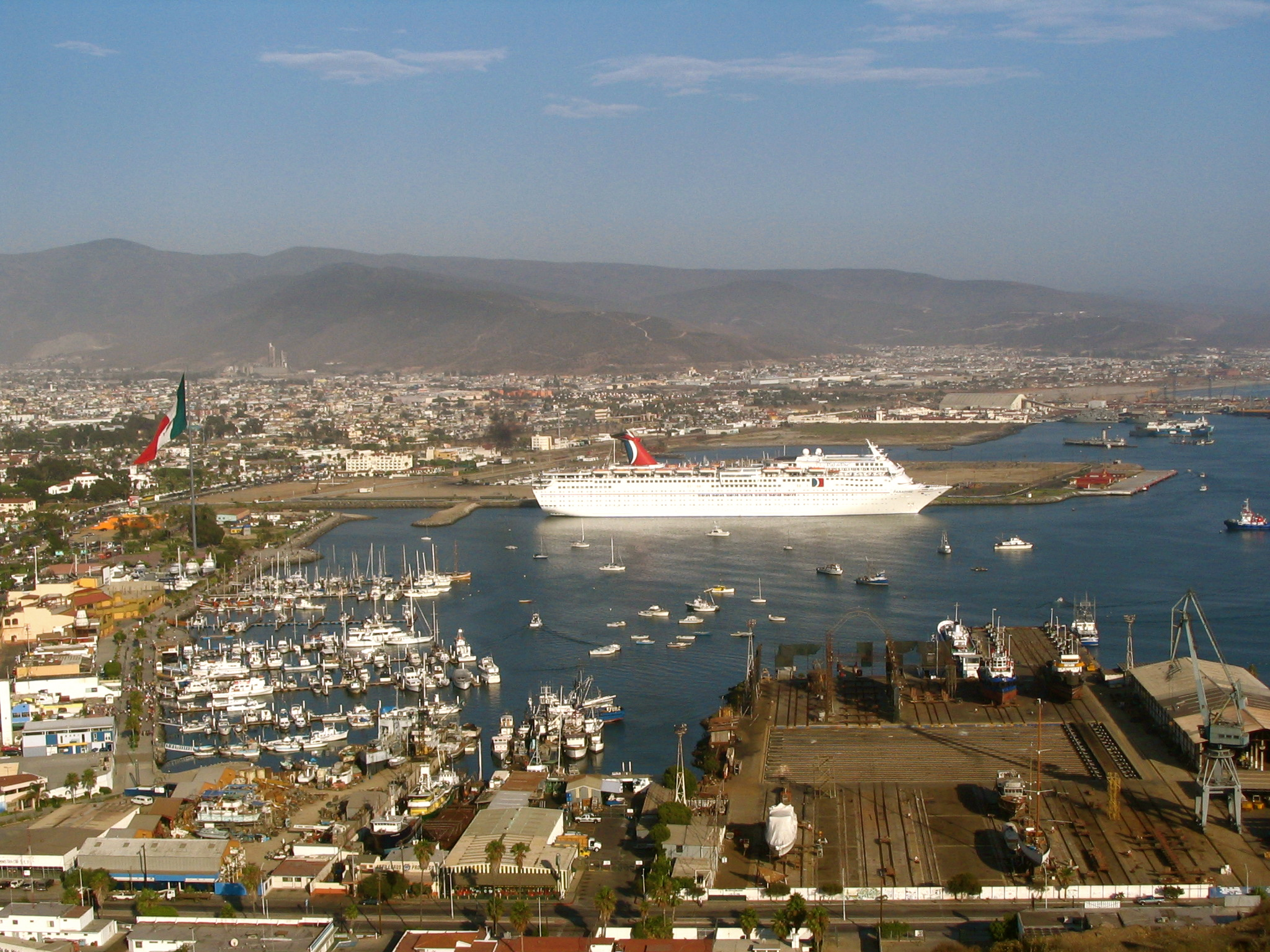
Ensenada, third largest municipality by population, and largest municipality by area.

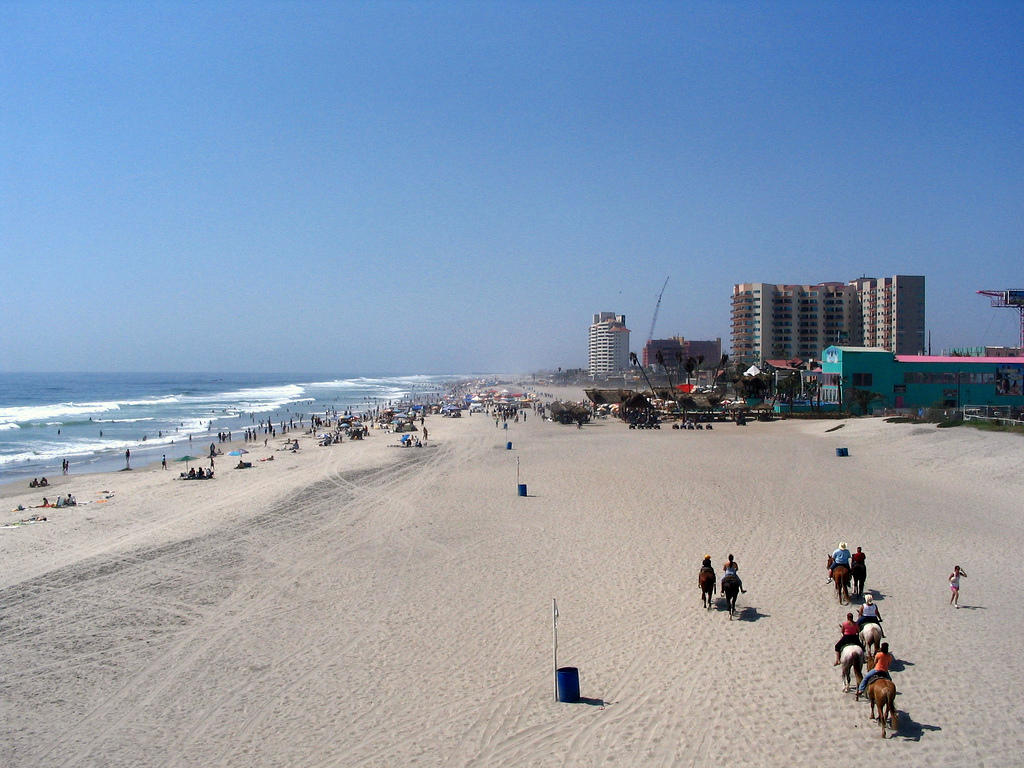
Playas de Rosarito, fourth largest municipality by population

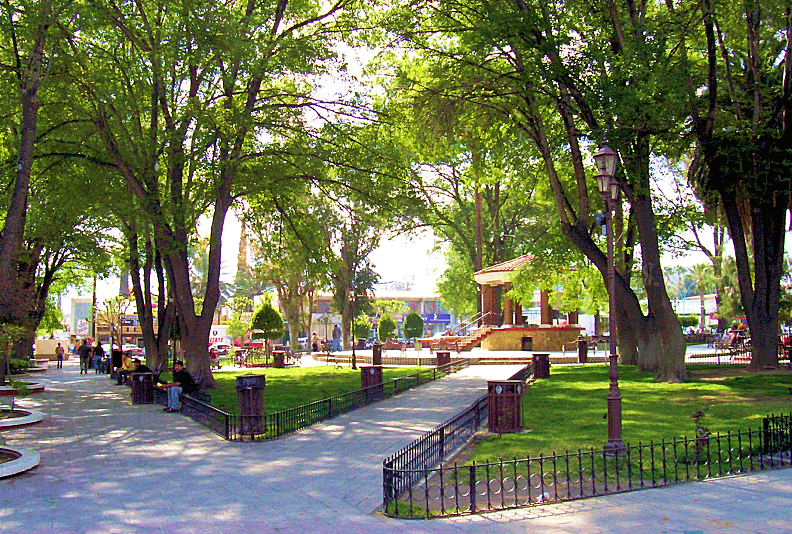
Tecate, the least populated municipality before the creation of San Felipe.

† State capital

Municipalities of Baja California
Name	Municipal seat	Population (2020)	Population (2010)	Change	Land area		Population density (2020)	Incorporation date
Name	Municipal seat	Population (2020)	Population (2010)	Change	km^{2}	sq mi	Population density (2020)	Incorporation date
Ensenada	Ensenada	443,807	466,814	−4.9%	19,526.80	7,539.34	22.7/km^{2} (58.9/sq mi)	May 15, 1882
Mexicali†	Mexicali	1,049,792	936,826	+12.1%	14,528.30	5,609.41	72.3/km^{2} (187.1/sq mi)	November 20, 1914
Playas de Rosarito	Rosarito	126,890	90,668	+40.0%	506.30	195.48	250.6/km^{2} (649.1/sq mi)	July 21, 1995
San Felipe (Note: San Felipe was created from parts of the municipalities of Ensenada and Mexicali on January 1, 2022. INEGI has not yet provided current land area or population figures for San Felipe, or updated the land area and population figures of Ensenada and Mexicali to reflect the change.)	San Felipe							January 1, 2022
San Quintín (Note: San Quintín was created from Ensenada on February 12, 2020, and thus does not appear in the 2010 census.)	San Quintín	117,568			32,953.30	12,723.34	3.6/km^{2} (9.2/sq mi)	February 12, 2020
Tecate	Tecate	108,440	101,079	+7.3%	2,861.20	1,104.72	37.9/km^{2} (98.2/sq mi)	March 11, 1917
Tijuana	Tijuana	1,922,523	1,559,683	+23.3%	1,074.10	414.71	1,789.9/km^{2} (4,635.8/sq mi)	March 11, 1917
Baja California	—	3,769,020	3,155,070	+19.5%	71,450	27,587.00	52.8/km^{2} (136.6/sq mi)	—
Mexico	—	126,014,024	112,336,538	+12.2%	1,972,550	761,606	63.9/km^{2} (165.5/sq mi)	—
