= Daylight saving time in Mexico =

Most of Mexico no longer observes daylight saving time (DST; Spanish: horario de verano ("summer schedule")) as it was abolished on Sunday, 30 October 2022. The exceptions are the entire state of Baja California, as well as the border municipalities in Chihuahua, Coahuila, Nuevo León, and Tamaulipas, which still observe daylight saving time matching the schedule of the United States beginning on the second Sunday of March and ending on the first Sunday of November.

From 1996 to 2022, DST was observed even in its tropical regions because of its increasing economic ties to the United States. It followed the schedule used by the United States before 2007, with DST beginning on the first Sunday of April and ending on the last Sunday of October. Although the United States changed the schedule for DST starting in 2007, only certain municipalities located less than 20 km from the border adopted this change.

== Overview ==
Baja California adopted daylight saving time in 1942 due to the state's close ties to the U.S. state of California. This made Baja California the first Mexican state to observe daylight saving time.

The federal government adopted daylight saving time nationwide in 1996 to decrease energy consumption and to facilitate commerce and tourism with the neighboring United States.

In December 2009, Congress permitted municipalities less than 20 kilometers from the U.S. border to synchronize their time with their U.S. counterparts. This resulted in these municipalities joining and leaving DST at the same time as the United States, relieving some border problems and confusion.

- Matamoros, Tamaulipas
- Reynosa, Tamaulipas
- Nuevo Laredo, Tamaulipas
- Anáhuac, Nuevo León
- Ciudad Acuña, Coahuila
- Piedras Negras, Coahuila
- Ojinaga, Chihuahua
- Ciudad Juárez, Chihuahua
- All of Baja California

Except for the border municipalities (above), daylight saving time in Mexico began on the first Sunday of April and ended on the last Sunday of October.

Federal deputy Francisco Saracho Navarro (PRI) proposed a bill in September 2015 to reduce confusion by modifying the aforementioned DST start and end dates, observed by the rest of the country, to match those followed by the border municipalities (above). Congress discarded the bill on 29 June 2016.

In July 2022, President Andrés Manuel López Obrador proposed a bill to eliminate daylight saving time after a survey showed that 71% of the general public supported the idea. Certain northern border municipalities would continue the practice of remaining harmonized with adjacent U.S. states. This bill was passed on 26 October 2022 and came into effect on the following Sunday, 30 October 2022, so clocks would stay on standard time permanently after that Sunday's shift from daylight time.

The law also established a process for any future time zone changes, where a state seeking a time zone change must submit a request from its state's legislature to Congress, and if Congress initiates the change, it must be approved by that state's legislature. This provision has been used once, when Congress amended the law to include eight border municipalities in Chihuahua.

In addition to the entire state of Baja California, the following municipalities still observe daylight saving time from the second Sunday of March until the first Sunday of November:

- Zona Centro (U.S. Central Time) (Standard: UTC−06:00 | DST: UTC−05:00)
  - Matamoros, Tamaulipas
  - Valle Hermoso, Tamaulipas
  - Río Bravo, Tamaulipas
  - Reynosa, Tamaulipas
  - Gustavo Díaz Ordaz, Tamaulipas
  - Camargo, Tamaulipas
  - Miguel Alemán, Tamaulipas
  - Mier, Tamaulipas
  - Guerrero, Tamaulipas
  - Nuevo Laredo, Tamaulipas
  - Anáhuac, Nuevo León
  - Zaragoza, Coahuila
  - Villa Unión, Coahuila
  - Piedras Negras, Coahuila
  - Ocampo, Coahuila
  - Nava, Coahuila
  - Morelos, Coahuila
  - Jiménez, Coahuila
  - Hidalgo, Coahuila
  - Guerrero, Coahuila
  - Allende, Coahuila
  - Acuña, Coahuila
  - Manuel Benavides, Chihuahua
  - Ojinaga, Chihuahua
  - Coyame del Sotol, Chihuahua
- Zona Pacífico (U.S. Mountain Time) (Standard: UTC−07:00 | DST: UTC−06:00)
  - Guadalupe, Chihuahua
  - Praxedis G. Guerrero, Chihuahua
  - Juárez, Chihuahua
  - Ascensión, Chihuahua
  - Janos, Chihuahua

=== Baja California ===
The state of Baja California (not Baja California Sur) has observed daylight saving time for several decades and, until 1996, was the only state to observe it.

Since 2022, Baja California is the only state that continues to observe DST statewide instead of along a limited border region.

=== Sonora ===
The state of Sonora has not observed DST since 1998 because of the non-observance of DST by most of its neighbor Arizona and its important economic ties with that U.S. state.

=== Island territories ===
The Islas Marías and the Revillagigedo Islands do not observe DST. The westernmost island of the Revillagigedo Archipelago, Clarion Island, uses UTC−08:00 (PST) all the time.

=== Quintana Roo ===
The state of Quintana Roo decided not to observe DST as of 1 February 2015, when it switched time zones from CST to EST.

== See also ==
- Daylight saving time by country
- Time in Mexico
