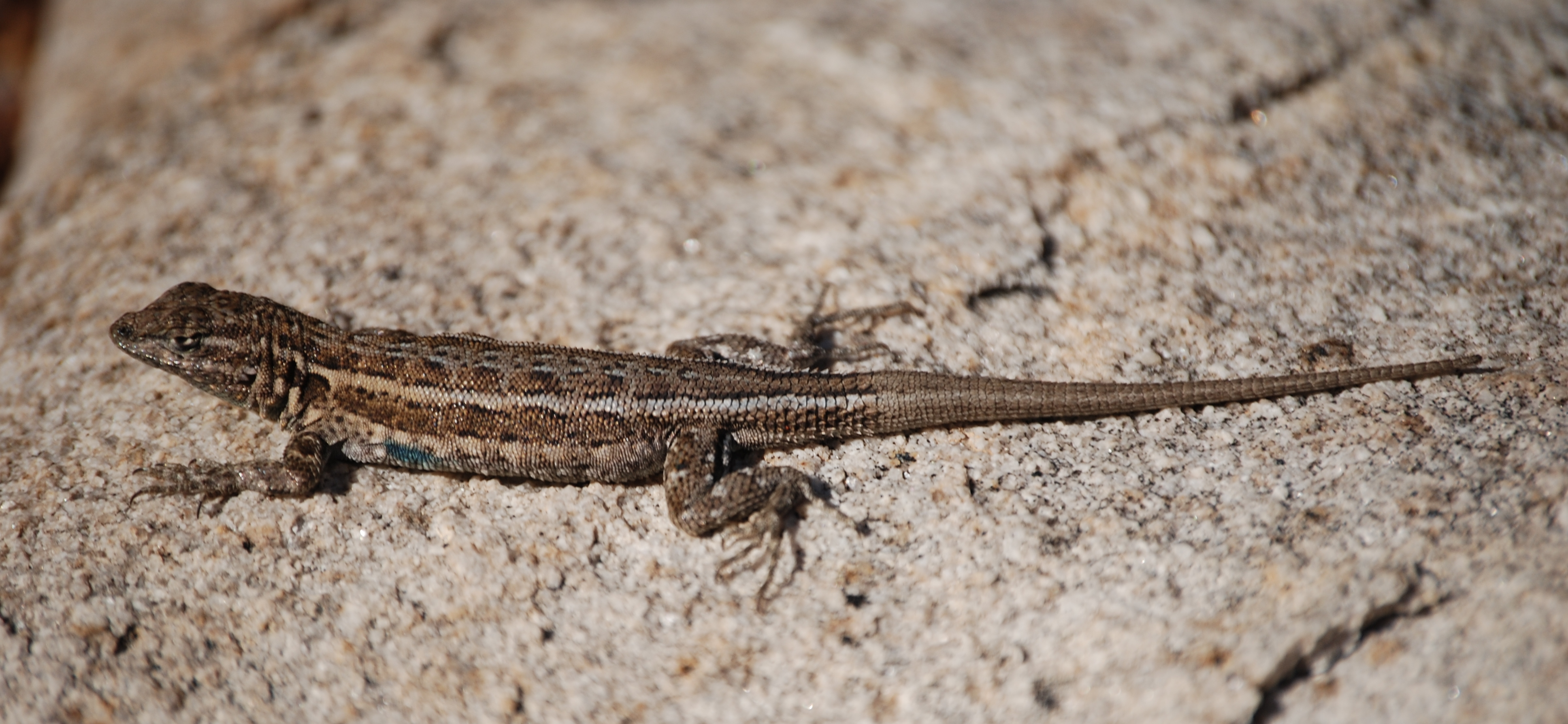

Conservation status
- Least Concern (IUCN 3.1)

Scientific classification
- Kingdom: Animalia
- Phylum: Chordata
- Class: Reptilia
- Order: Squamata
- Suborder: Iguania
- Family: Phrynosomatidae
- Genus: Uta
- Species: U. stansburiana

Binomial name
- Uta stansburiana Baird & Girard, 1852

Subspecies
- U. s. stansburiana northern side-blotched lizard; U. s. nevadensis Nevada side-blotched lizard; U. s. uniformis plateau side-blotched lizard; U. s. elegans western side-blotched lizard; U. s. stellata San Benito side-blotched lizard; U. s. concinna Cedros side-blotched lizard; U. s. martinensis San Martin side-blotched lizard (disputed); U. s. taylori Taylor's side-blotched lizard (disputed)
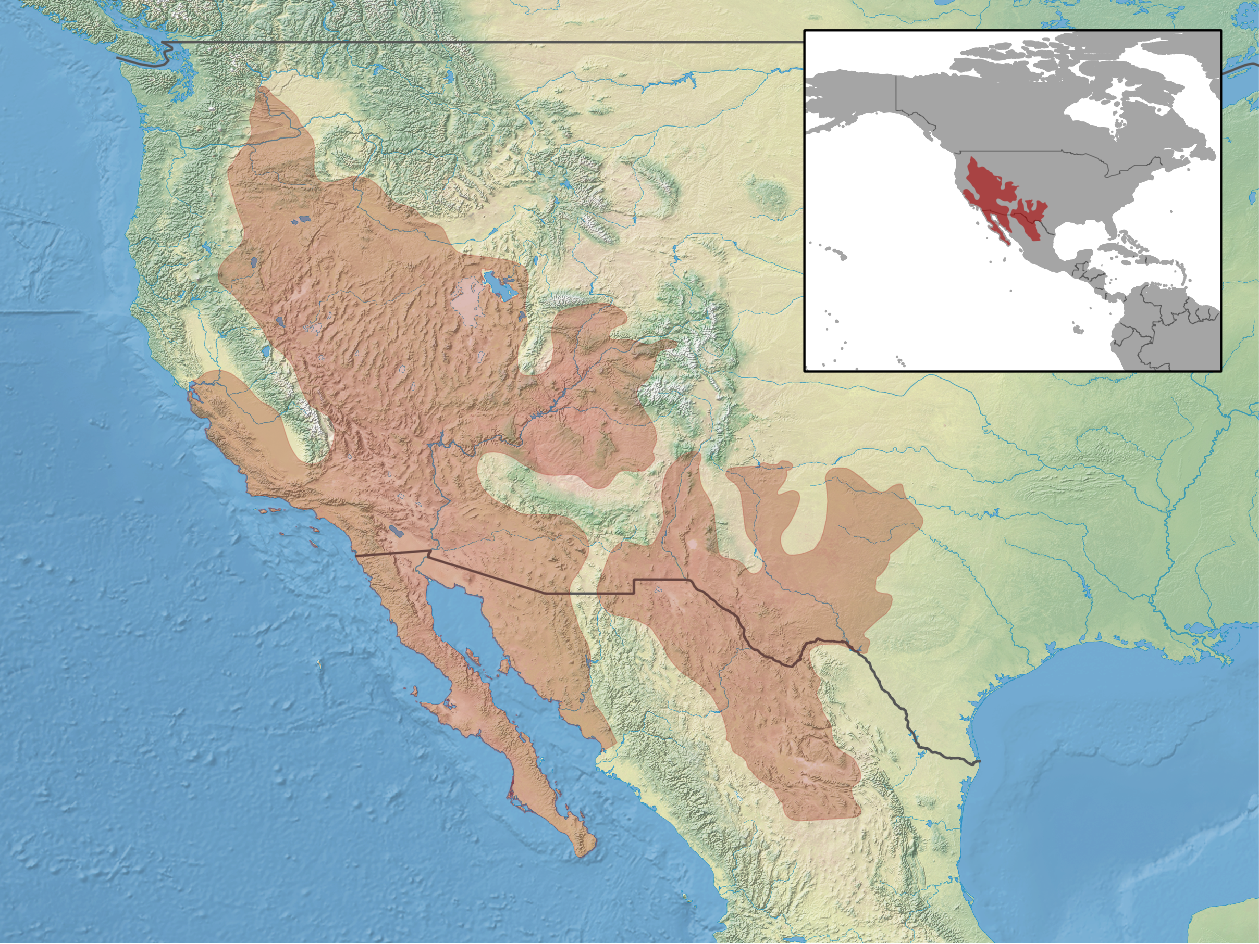

Synonyms
- Uta concinna; Uta elegans; Uta levis; Uta martinensis; Uta stansburiana hesperis; Uta stellata; Uta wrighti; Uta irregularis; Uta lateralis; Uta nelsoni; Uta tuberculata

= Common side-blotched lizard =

Species of lizard

The common side-blotched lizard (Uta stansburiana) is a species of side-blotched lizard in the family Phrynosomatidae. The species is native to dry regions of the western United States and northern Mexico. It is notable for having a unique form of polymorphism wherein each of the three different male morphs utilizes a different strategy in acquiring mates. The three morphs compete against each other following a pattern of rock paper scissors, where one morph has advantages over another but is outcompeted by the third.

== Etymology ==
The specific epithet, stansburiana, is in honor of Captain Howard Stansbury of the US Corps of Topographical Engineers, who collected the first specimens while leading the 1849-1851 expedition to explore and survey the Great Salt Lake of Utah.

== Taxonomy ==
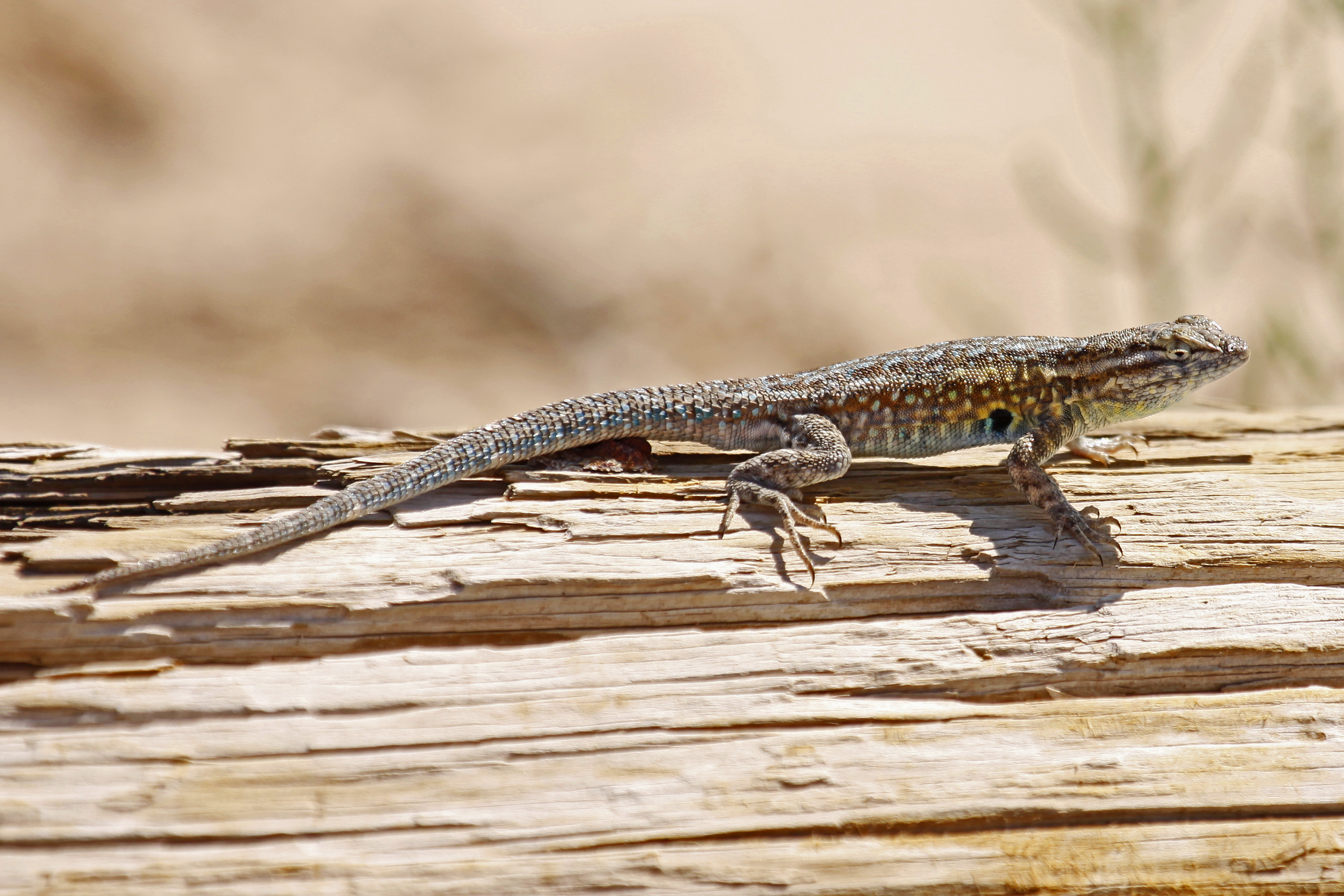
Image of common side-blotched lizard. A distinguishing feature of this species is the dark blotch behind the front leg, which is clearly seen in this image. The dark blotch is generally less prominent in females than in this male.

The systematics and taxonomy of the widespread and variable lizards of the genus Uta is much disputed. Countless forms and morphs have been described as subspecies or even distinct species.

- The forms which occur in most of Mexico (except Baja California) have been recognized as a very distinct species, the eastern side-blotched lizard, Uta stejnegeri.
- Populations from San Benito and Cedros Islands were separated as distinct species Uta stellata and U. concinna, but are now included in U. stansburiana.
- Those of Isla Santa Catalina and Isla Salsipuedes, U. squamata and U. antiqua are sometimes included in this species, too, but this is certainly not correct in the latter case, and probably in the former also.
- Based on the same data that would give U. squamata species rank, the southern Baja California populations could arguably be split off (as Uta elegans), too.
- The proposed subspecies martinensis and taylori are probably not valid.
- The populations on Isla Ángel de la Guarda, Isla Mejia and Isla Rasa almost certainly constitute a separate species closer to Uta palmeri, and that of San Esteban Island may so too, being close to squamata.
- The status of the Isla Encantada group populations named as Uta encantadae, U. lowei and U. tumidarostra is not completely resolved; these distinct populations are of comparatively recent origin and are sometimes included in this species, but their unique adaptations to living in intertidal habitat suggest they should be considered distinct; whether as one or as three species remains unresolved.

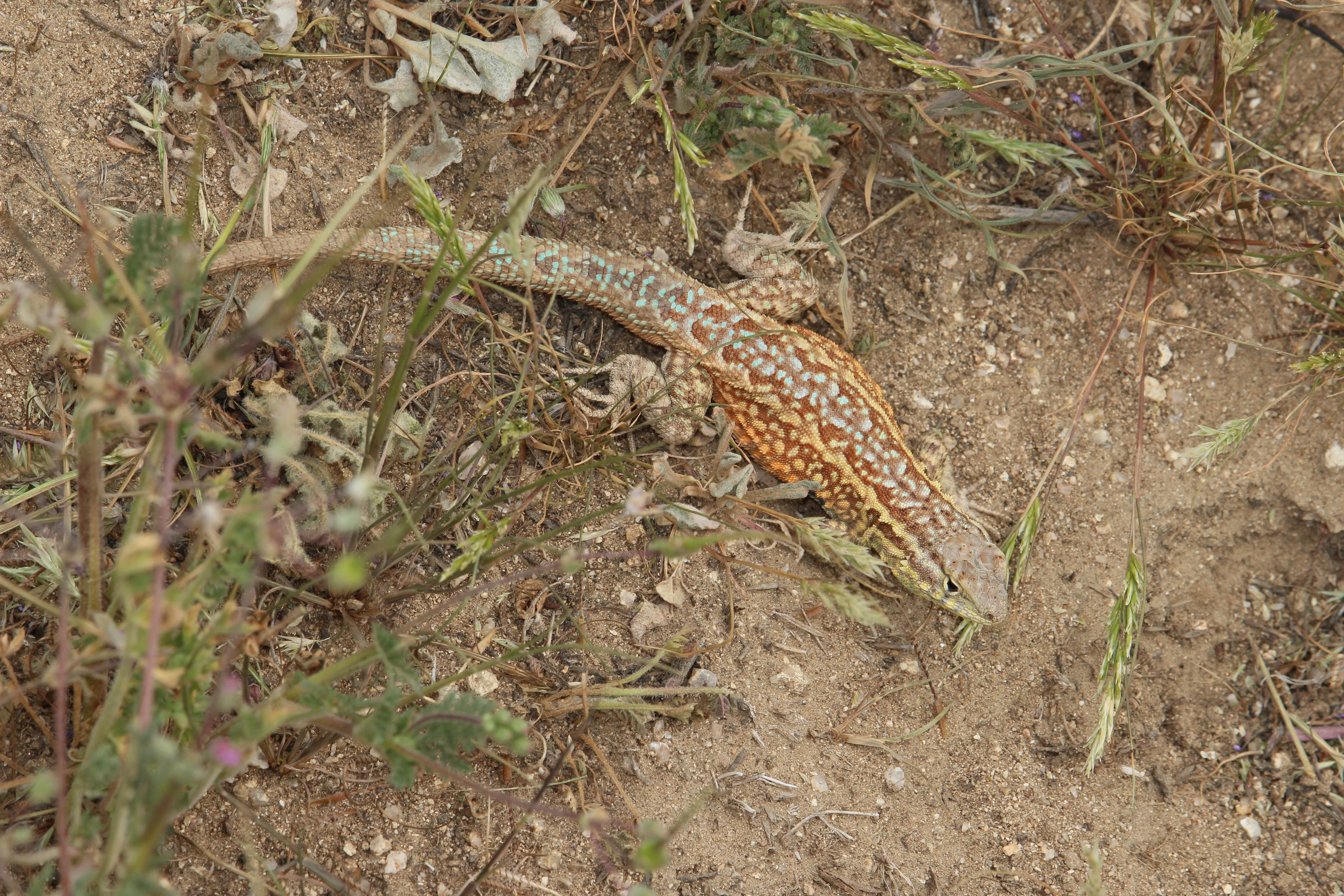
The male (pictured above) is more brightly colored than the female and is usually distinguished by the presence of blue spots on its back, especially near the base of the tail. Also, the base of the tail is swollen in the male.

== Physical description ==
The common side-blotched lizard displays a moderate degree of sexual dimorphism. Males can grow up to 60mm (2.4 inches) from snout to vent, while females are typically a little smaller. Females may have stripes along their backs/sides, or may be relatively drab. Both sexes have a dark blotch on the lateral aspect (side) of the thorax, just behind the front limbs. This dark blotch is generally less prominent in females than in males. The degree of pigmentation varies with both sex and population. Some males can have blue flecks spread over their backs and tails, and their sides may be yellow or orange, while others may be unpatterned. Males are usually more brightly colored than females, and often have blue spots on the dorsum, especially near the base of the tail. Also, males display a hemipenal bulge at the base of the tail.

Males of the species exhibit three distinct color polymorphisms in their throat colors. The skin of the throat may be orange, blue, or yellow. Coloration of the throat is critical, as it is closely related to the mating behavior of both males and females. The different throat morphologies displayed by the male side-blotched lizard is also correlated with their sprinting speed. Across all three morphs, sprinting speed is positively correlated with blue hue, the brightness of the yellow throat, and the level of saturation of the orange throats. The relationship between physical capabilities and coloration may play a role in sexual competition amongst male side-blotched lizards.

The speed of these male lizards during the end of their reproductive seasons is dependent on their body temperature. The maximum sprinting speed of these lizards is achieved when the body temperature is between 35-38 degrees Celsius.

== Physiology ==
When comparing populations within wind farms and in neighbouring control sites, no differences in oxidative stress are seen in the side-blotched lizard. In females oxidative stress also increases with the number of yolk follicles produced.

=== Genetic determination of throat-color polymorphism ===
Analysis of DNA nuclear microsatellites has provided genetic evidence for the rock-paper-scissors behavior pattern of male side-blotched lizard competition. In populations where all three morphs are present, shared paternity between yellow- and blue-throated individuals occurs at a rate significantly below random chance, while shared paternity between yellow- and orange-throated males occurs at a rate significantly above chance. In addition, blue-throated males often shared paternity with orange-throated males, despite having mostly yellow-throated neighbors.

Blood plasma testosterone levels play an important role in the creation of the three male morphs both during and after development. Orange-throated males have 46-48% higher plasma testosterone levels compared to their yellow- or blue-throated counterparts. Experimental elevation of plasma testosterone levels in the other two male morphs led to increases in endurance, aggressiveness, and territory size to the degree expressed by normal orange-throated males. In addition, the transformation of yellow-throated males to blue-throated males is accompanied by an increase in their plasma testosterone levels.

Throat color in side-blotched lizards is genetically determined, and has high heritability. It is determined by a single Mendelian factor with three alleles. In males, the o allele is the dominant allele, and the b allele is recessive to the y allele. Therefore, phenotypically orange-throated males have genotypes of either oo, ob, or oy. Yellow-throated males have genotypes of either yy or yb, and blue-throated males are exclusively bb. In females, all individuals with the dominant o allele are orange-throated, while those lacking an o allele develop yellow throats.

=== Tails ===
For the side-blotched lizard, limbs serve as an anti-predatory defense – their ability to survive without a tail allows them to escape predation after being caught. While this defense mechanism can be advantageous, the loss of a tail can also negatively impacts a lizard’s survival and reproduction. For the Uta stranburiana, the loss of a tail is accompanied by a loss of social status amongst their peers. This can contribute to them having a hard time acquiring and maintaining a superior home range. The influence of tail loss on survivorship, however, is only significant during conditions of low mortality – when the overall mortality rate of side-blotched lizards is 30-40% higher than average, the condition of the tail does not impact the survival of adults and juveniles. This is because the tails of side-blotched lizards are not energetic lipids stores. As mentioned earlier, lizards that lose their tails are at a greater risk of predation than lizards with their tails intact. Since social status is an important survival mechanism amongst side-blotched lizards, researchers have suggested that the loss of a tail, which contributes to a decrease in social status, forces tailless side-blotched lizards to inhabit more inferior home ranges. Therefore, in addition to losing a physiological defense mechanism when losing their tails, side-blotched lizards are also inclined to inhabit inferior living conditions which bolsters their risk of predation.

== Mating ==
=== Rock–paper–scissors mechanism ===
Male side-blotched lizards exhibit distinct polymorphism in their throat colors, and can be divided into three different categories. Each of these three different morphs varies in how it competes for mates, and variation within a breeding population is maintained by a rock paper scissors mechanism of frequency-dependent sexual selection. A cycle is created where the least common morph of one breeding season often has the largest number of mature living offspring in the next year. This is because one morph does particularly well against another, but poorly in comparison to the third.

- Orange-throated males are "ultradominant". They are the largest and most aggressive morph, defending relatively large (about 100 m^{2} or 120 yd^{2}) territories and keeping harems of females with which they mate. They are adept at stealing mates from blue-throated individuals, but are vulnerable to cuckoldry by the yellow-throated female mimics. Orange-throated males also have significantly reduced yearly survival rates compared to the other two morphs.
- Blue-throated males are "dominant". They are intermediate in size, and guard smaller territories containing only a single female. As they only have one mate to defend, they are better at catching yellow-throated sneaks, but are also susceptible to having their mates stolen by the larger, more aggressive orange-throated males.
- Yellow-throated males are "sneakers". Their coloration is similar to that of sexually mature females, and they typically mimic female "rejection" displays when they encounter dominant orange- or blue-throated males. Unlike the other morphs, yellow-throated males do not hold territories. Instead, they have wide-reaching home ranges that may overlap with several other lizards’ territories. They rely on their mimicry to sneak matings with unattended females. This is more easily achieved among the harems kept by orange-throated males than by the single, closely guarded mate of the blue-throated males. Though orange-throated males have the highest mortality rates, yellow-throated males have higher relative rates of posthumous fertilization (posthumous birth), indicating an increased reliance on sperm competition as part of their reproductive strategy. Yellow-throated males can in specific instances transform into blue-throated males over the course of the breeding season. This transformation is usually triggered by the death of a nearby dominant male, and the blue patches the yellow-throated males develop is qualitatively distinct from the blue patches of genetically blue-throated males. Not all yellow-throated males transform, but when they do, they give up their female mimicry and adopt the "dominant" morph's behavior pattern. No transformations in the other direction, in which dominant males gain yellow-throat coloration, have been observed.

Female side-blotched lizards have also been shown to exhibit behaviorally correlated differences in throat coloration. Orange-throated females are considered r-strategists. They typically produce large clutches consisting of many small eggs. In contrast, yellow-throated females are K-strategists that lay fewer, larger eggs. Like the male morphs, the frequencies of these two female morphs also cycle with time. However, the cycle is shorter – two years in comparison to the male morphs’ four- or five-year cycle – and is not a result of frequency-dependent sexual selection. Instead, orange-throated females are more successful at lower population densities, where competition for food is less fierce and less selection pressure from predation occurs. When population density is high and/or when predators abound, yellow-throated females tend to have higher reproductive success. In general, their larger hatchlings have higher short-term and long-term survival rates, and these advantages are magnified in times of scarcity. Side-blotched lizards show displays and aggression shortly after hatching, and even minute differences in size can lead to increased social dominance and capacity to outcompete the smaller hatchlings.

The blue female morphs behave similar to yellow female morphs instead of orange female morphs.

== Reproduction ==
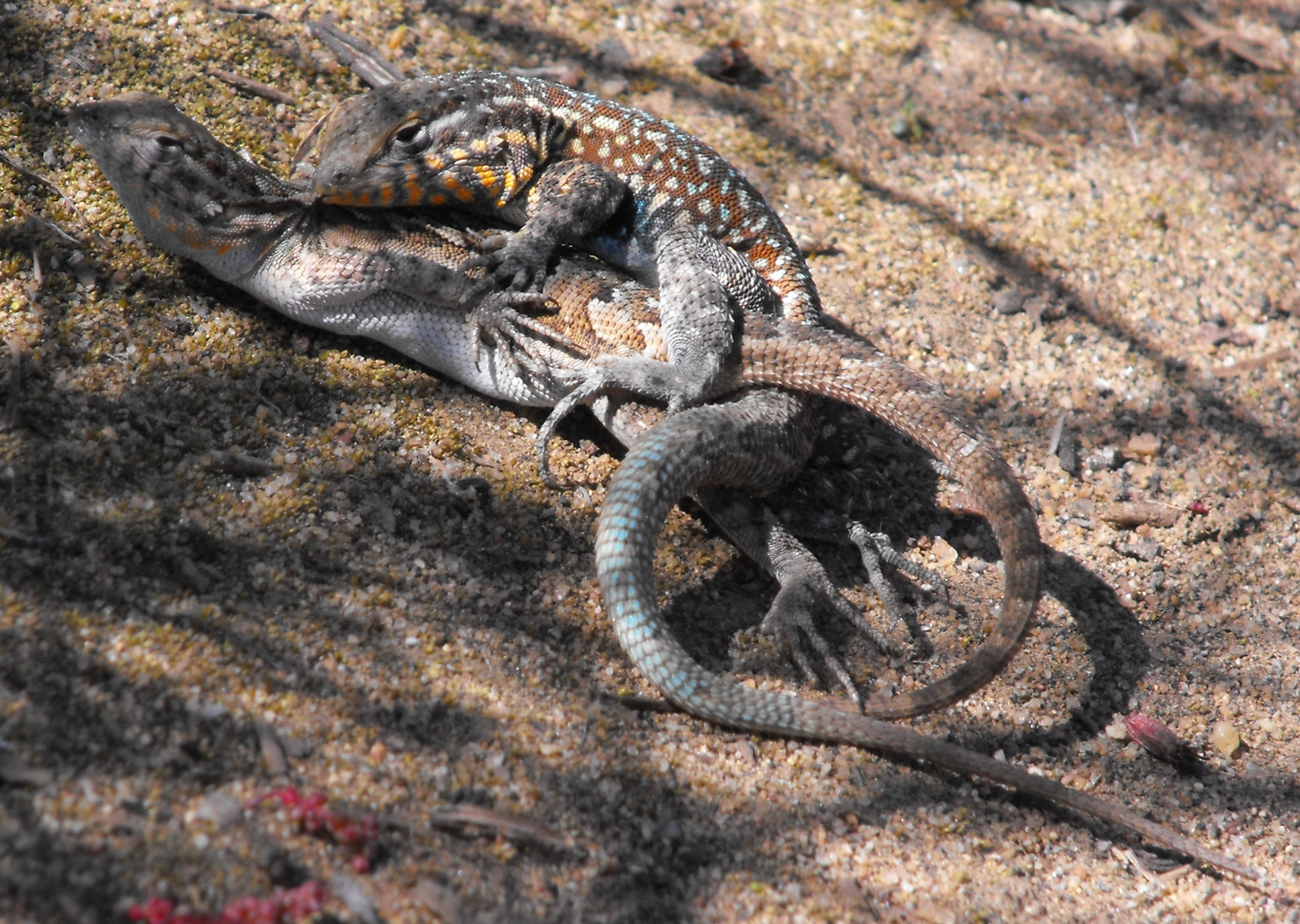
Image of common side-blotched lizards mating. The male lizard is on the right, and the female lizard is on the left.

Female side-blotched lizards lay clutches with an average of 5.1 eggs and a maximum of 9 eggs in a single clutch. Smaller clutch sizes, often associated with yellow-throated females, have an increased frequency of eggs bursting upon being laid or egg binding, suggesting an upper physiological limit to how much a female can invest in each individual egg she lays.

The presence of a tail on female side-blotched lizards can impact reproduction. Tailless female lizards have reduced overall survivorship due to the increased risk of predation they experience without this physiological defense mechanism. Although tailless female side-blotched lizards experience an increased risk of death, the loss of a tail does not impose an energetic handicap on them that negatively impacts their potential growth and reproduction. Additionally, the lack of a tail in adult males attempting to mate with females during the spring decreases their ability to successfully copulate which suggests that tails are sufficient to increase the likelihood of males attracting sexual partners during reproductive seasons. In addition to the way that physiological traits affect female reproduction, the age of females, the environment they inhabit, and the time in the reproductive season also affect female fecundity. A study conducted by researchers at Utah State University confirmed that older females lay more eggs than yearling females and that the annual variations that have been previously observed in female fecundity are the result of variations in the numbers of clutches (clutch frequency), not by the average size of clutches produced.

As the reproductive season progresses for side-blotched lizards, females tend to produce fewer but larger eggs. Researchers hypothesize that this occurs because of the tradeoff between egg size and clutch size. Later in their reproductive seasons, female lizards are selected to increase their egg size to produce larger and more competitively superior hatchlings because during this time in the season, food is generally more scarce and juvenile density is high. It has also been suggested that selection favors smaller clutches at the end of the reproductive season because females invest their remaining reproductive energy into their last clutches. Therefore, these females want to ensure that this remaining energy was well spent and that her hatchlings will have a good chance of survival. With a decreased clutch size, when the female side-blotched lizard allocates her energy into her last clutch, each hatchling will receive more parental investment from their mother – assuming that the mother’s energy is divided equally among the hatchlings of the smaller clutch. Researchers at Utah State University also verified that clutch frequency is positively correlated with the density of rainfall. Their results indicated that there is a causative association between winter rainfall and clutch frequency for female side-blotched lizards. The researchers suggested that air temperatures play an important role in the timing and deposition of the first spring clutch – that increases in winter rainfall induce earlier clutches in female side-blotched lizards.

== Speciation ==
The "rock-paper-scissors" mating strategy is a genetically-based male polymorphism that has been maintained over millions of years throughout many populations of side-blotched lizard in the United States and Mexico. However, speciation has resulted from the formation of reproductive isolation between populations when a population loses of one or more of the male morphologies. However, speciation due to the loss of a male morph has occurred when populations lose one or more male morphs and become reproductively isolated from populations with the ancestral polymorphism. For side-blotched lizards, the morph lost most commonly is the sneaker male. In other cases, speciation has occurred as a result of hybridization between morphs occurring in response to rapid changes in the environment.

The loss of a male morph can change selection on the remaining morphs. In side-blotched lizards, for example, female mate preferences change after the loss of a male morph, and alleles that once allowed other male morphs to outcompete the lost morph for mates are no longer as beneficial. These shifts in selection often lead to greater sexual size dimorphism. Larger male and female size regularly follow the loss of a polymorphism, as seen in the side-blotched lizards. Predator-prey dynamic also change after a male morph is lost, with predators evolving to prey on the remaining morphologies.

== Behavior ==
=== Aggression ===
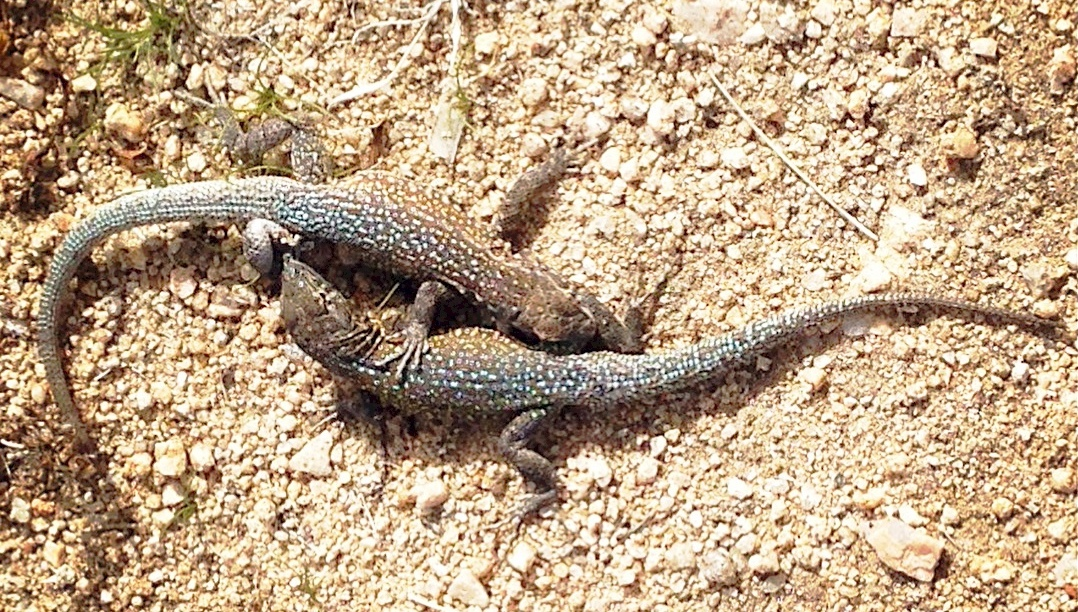
Fighting

Dominant male side-blotched lizards are aggressive in the defense of their territories. Upon spotting another conspecific within their territories, resident individuals enter a state of heightened alertness. They perform one or more "pushups" (vertical bobbing motions), arch their backs, and extend their limbs before approaching the intruder. If the intruder is another male, the resident follows up by rushing, butting, or nipping at the intruder, which will then usually proceed to run away.

Tail length is important in the determination of dominance hierarchies. Like many other lizard species, side-blotched lizards use tail autotomy as an escape mechanism. However, a reduction in tail length also confers a loss of social status for both males and females. Males will autotomize their tails less readily than will females, likely due to the increased importance of social status for males. Subordinate females can still mate, but male reproductive success is directly tied to their social status.

==== Courtship with aggression ====
If the intruder is a female, the male resident will initiate courtship, which consists of circling, flank-biting, licking, smelling, shallower head-bobbing, and eventually copulation. Body shape and passivity are the main releasers for courtship activity, and males have been observed in trying to court and copulate with smaller lizards of other species, as well as smaller subordinate side-blotched lizards.

=== Aggression among different morphs ===
Side-blotched lizards come in three different morphs; the orange and blue morphs are known to be territorial while the yellow morphs are known to be non-territorial. It is important to understand these differences because the territorial orange and blue morphs rely on spatial processing mechanisms to acquire and defend their territories. This suggests that there are differences in neuronal plasticity across the three morphs in the regions of their brains that are responsible for the processing, recognition, and learning of new spatial information. In a study published by the University of Nevada, researchers confirmed that when territorial side-blotched lizards are placed in larger spaces, the production of new neurons in the region of their brains responsible for spatial learning become stimulated. Interestingly, this does not happen in non-territorial yellow side-blotched lizard morphs which indicates that non-territorial morphs do not have the neuronal capacity to behave territorially in the way that orange and blue morphs can.

The opposing forces of sexual selection and natural selection are important for the maintenance of trait variation in alternative reproductive strategies in side-blotched lizards. The OBY locus that determines throat phenotype in these lizards is an important genetic marker that is influenced by the levels of gonadotropin hormone modulation of testosterone in male side-blotched lizards. Suzanne Mills confirmed that the oo, ob (orange phenotype), and bb (blue phenotype) males are near their physiological and behavioral capacities for reproductive success. On the other hand, yy and by (yellow phenotype) males are below their physiological maximum. The researchers have proposed that although the levels gonadotropins are important for the maintenance of physiological, morphological, and behavioral variation in male side-blotched lizards, they are also responsible for the immunosuppression of sexual signals in yellow-throated side-blotched male lizards.

=== Spatial processing ===
Although territorial behaviors are important defining differences between the different morphologies of these lizards, environmental experiences play important roles in the cortical volume of both territorial and non-territorial side-blotched lizards. The phenotypic differences between the different male morphologies of side-blotched lizards can be exacerbated by the experiences that the lizards encounter. LaDage Roth Sinervo et al 2016 confirmed that environmental experiences of both territorial and non-territorial side-blotched lizards affects the cortical volume of their brains. When these lizards grow up in controlled captive environments, the cortical volume of their brains are smaller, regardless of whether they are territorial or not. This is important because spatial recognition and processing occur in the cortical region of their brains and certain behaviors, like territoriality, that are important for survival rely on the recognition of space. Therefore, the experiences that side-blotched lizards have affect their cortical volume and subsequently, their cortical phenotypes. While there is a confirmed relationship between territoriality, spatial informational processing, and neuronal plasticity, researchers have suggested that testosterone plays a role in the regulation of medial cortical volumes. In addition, research has demonstrated that testosterone affects territorial males more significantly than non-territorial males. This is likely because during the reproduction season there is an increase in male territoriality, territory size, and testosterone levels. Although more research is needed to confirm that there is a causative relationship between elevated testosterone levels and increases in territorial behaviors, territorial animals rely on spatial memory to remember the boundaries of their territories which is important for detecting potential female partners that might enter their home space range.

== Predation ==
Side-blotched lizards encounter a plethora of different predators in the wild and they engage in a variety of escape behaviors to avoid predation. In a study published in the Canadian Journal of Zoology, researchers confirmed that these escape behaviors – flight initiation distance, distance fled, and refuge entry – do not differ depending on what type of predator the lizard encounters or whether that predator is relatively abundant in their environment. Side-blotched lizards do, however, tend to escape more directly towards refuge when they encounter predatory lizards while less directly towards refuge when encountering predatory snakes.

== Diet and feeding ==
Side-blotched lizards display feeding behavior which can be influenced by sex or season. In a study conducted by Best et al.., these lizards were found to consume diets largely based upon arthropod populations within the area, within a given season. These populations vary by year, and different arthropod populations will fluctuate seasonally. The study showed a correlation between sex and diet, giving way to a number of theories that speculate why gender has an effect on feeding behavior and diet. One mechanism proposes the behavior differences depend on gender, such as guarding territories and attracting mates, are responsible for, or a contributing factor in, feeding behavior. Alternatively, the sexual difference in feeding behavior could also act in favor of reducing intraspecific competition for resources, with individuals eating prey appropriate for their respective size (ex. small females consuming smaller prey).

Feeding regimes in side-blotched lizards are also influenced by their body temperatures. Waldschmidt, Jones & Porter 1986 confirmed that the body temperature of side-blotched lizards affects their consumption rate of food and the passage time of that ingested food, but body temperature does not affect their digestive coefficient. When the body temperature of the lizard increased between 20 and 36 degrees Celsius, the probability of eating increased curvilinearly while the passage time of ingested food decreased curvilinearly.

== Parasites ==
Like most animals, side-blotched lizards are infected by a variety of parasites. Intestinal parasites include nematodes and cestodes. Blood parasites include members of the Apicomplexa such as Schellackia occidentalis and species of Lankesterella. The tegument is infected by several species of mites. Out of these, Neotrombicula are the most common ectoparasites. The number of Neotrombicula parasites is reduced in populations of side-blotched lizards near wind farms. Parasites can alter metabolism and reproductive success of side-blotched lizards due to body temperature changes in response to fighting the infection.

== See also ==
- r/K selection theory
