= Isla Coloradito =

- Location within Baja California Location within Mexico

Geography
- Location: Gulf of California
- Coordinates: 30°03′5.75″N 114°29′19.84″W
- Highest elevation: 80 m (260 ft)

Administration
- Mexico
- State: Baja California

Demographics
- Population: uninhabited

Isla Coloradito is an island in the Gulf of California east of the Baja California Peninsula. The island is uninhabited and is part of San Felipe Municipality.

== Biology ==
Isla Coloradito has only one endemic species of reptile, Uta tumidarostra (Swollen-Nosed Side-blotched Lizard).
