= Islotes Blancos =

Island in Mexico

- Location within Mexico

Geography
- Location: Gulf of California
- Coordinates: 30°01′4.38″N 114°27′59.91″W
- Highest elevation: 10 m (30 ft)

Administration
- Mexico
- State: Baja California

Demographics
- Population: uninhabited

Islotes Blancos, is an island in the Gulf of California east of the Baja California Peninsula. The island is uninhabited and is part of the Mexicali Municipality.

== Biology ==
Islotes Blancos has only one species of reptile, the Enchanted Side-blotched Lizard (Uta encantadae).
