= San Felipe Municipality, Baja California =

Municipality in the Mexican state of Baja California

San Felipe
- Municipality
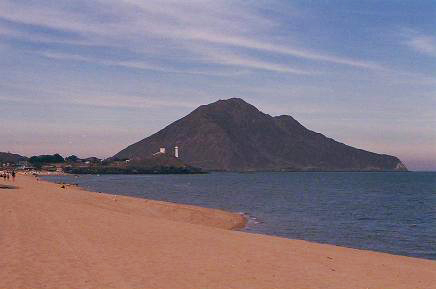
- The beach at San Felipe, with the Cerro El Machorro at Point San Felipe in the background

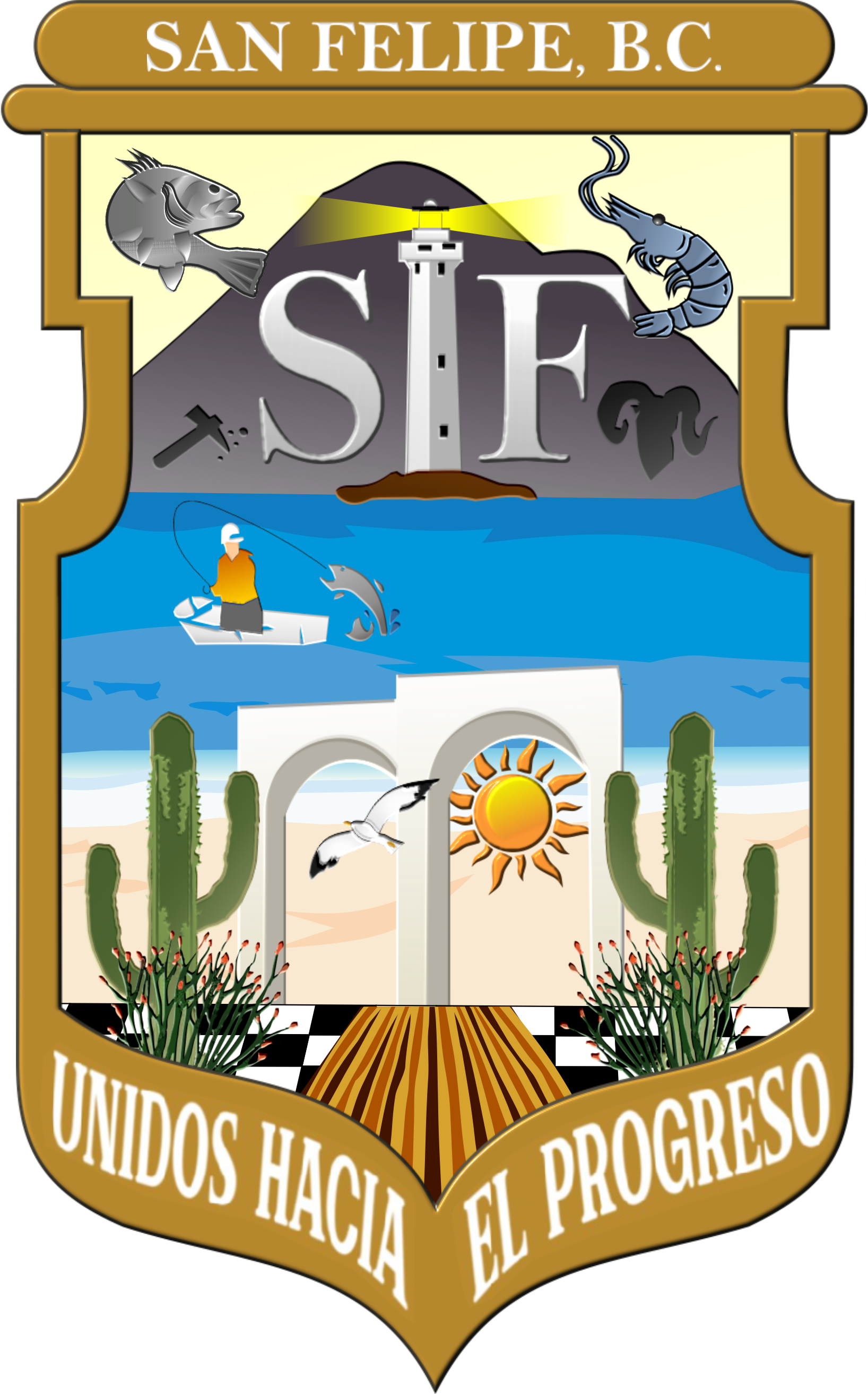
- Coat of arms

- Approximate borders of San Felipe in Baja California
- Coordinates: 31°01′N 114°50′W
- Country: Mexico
- State: Baja California
- Inaugurated: 1 January 2022
- Seat: San Felipe

Government
  - Municipal president: José Luis Dagnino López

Area
  - Total: 10,808 km^{2} (4,173 sq mi)

Population (2010 Census)
  - Total: 18,369
  - Density: 1.6996/km^{2} (4.4019/sq mi)
  - Seat: 16,702
- Time zone: UTC–08:00 (Zona Noroeste)
  - Summer (DST): UTC–07:00 (DST)

San Felipe is the newest municipality in the Mexican state of Baja California. Inaugurated on 1 January 2022, it is located approximately 190 kilometres (120 mi) south of Mexicali, the state capital.

== Geography ==
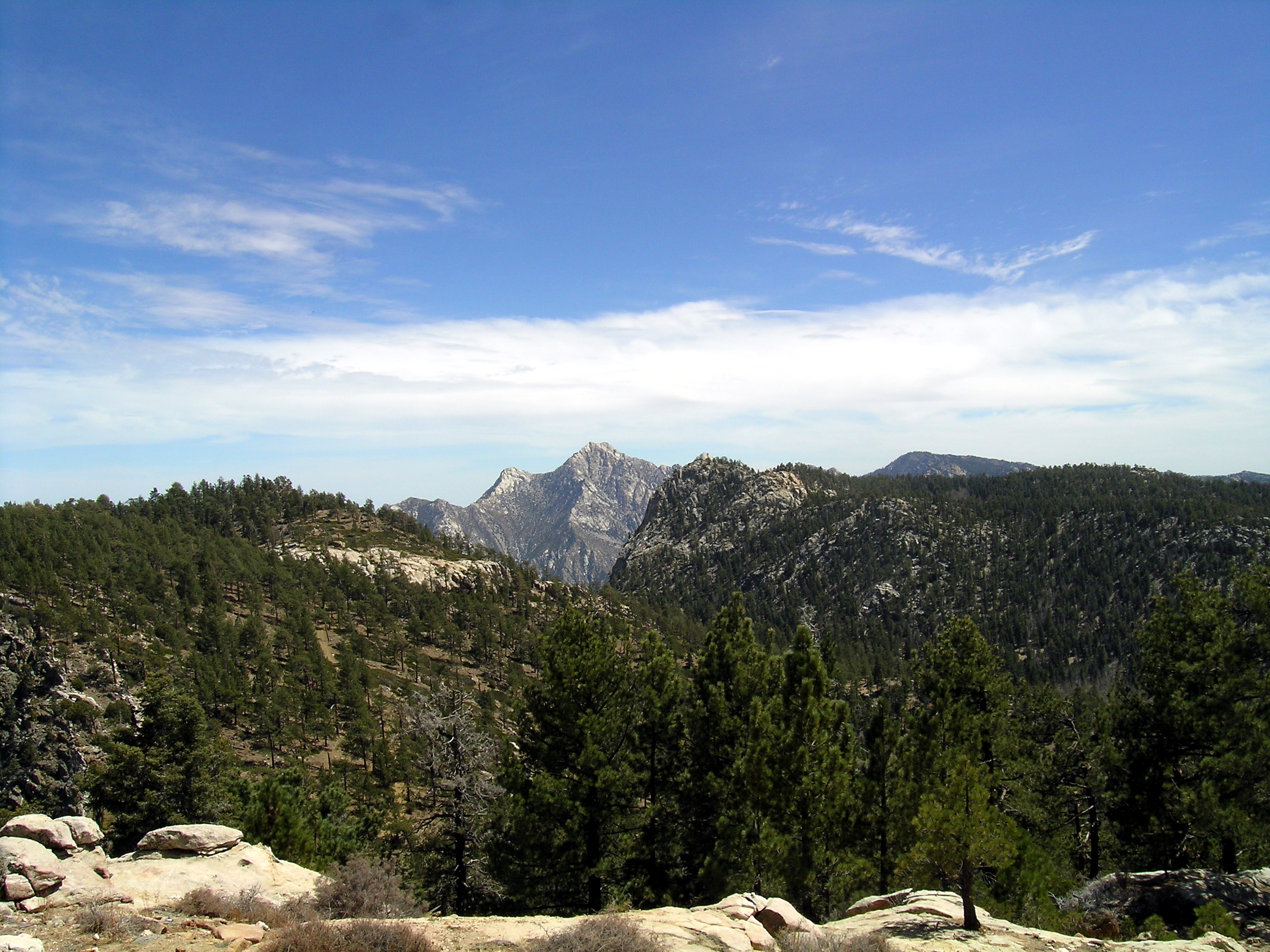
Picacho del Diablo, the highest point in Baja California, in the Sierra de San Pedro Mártir

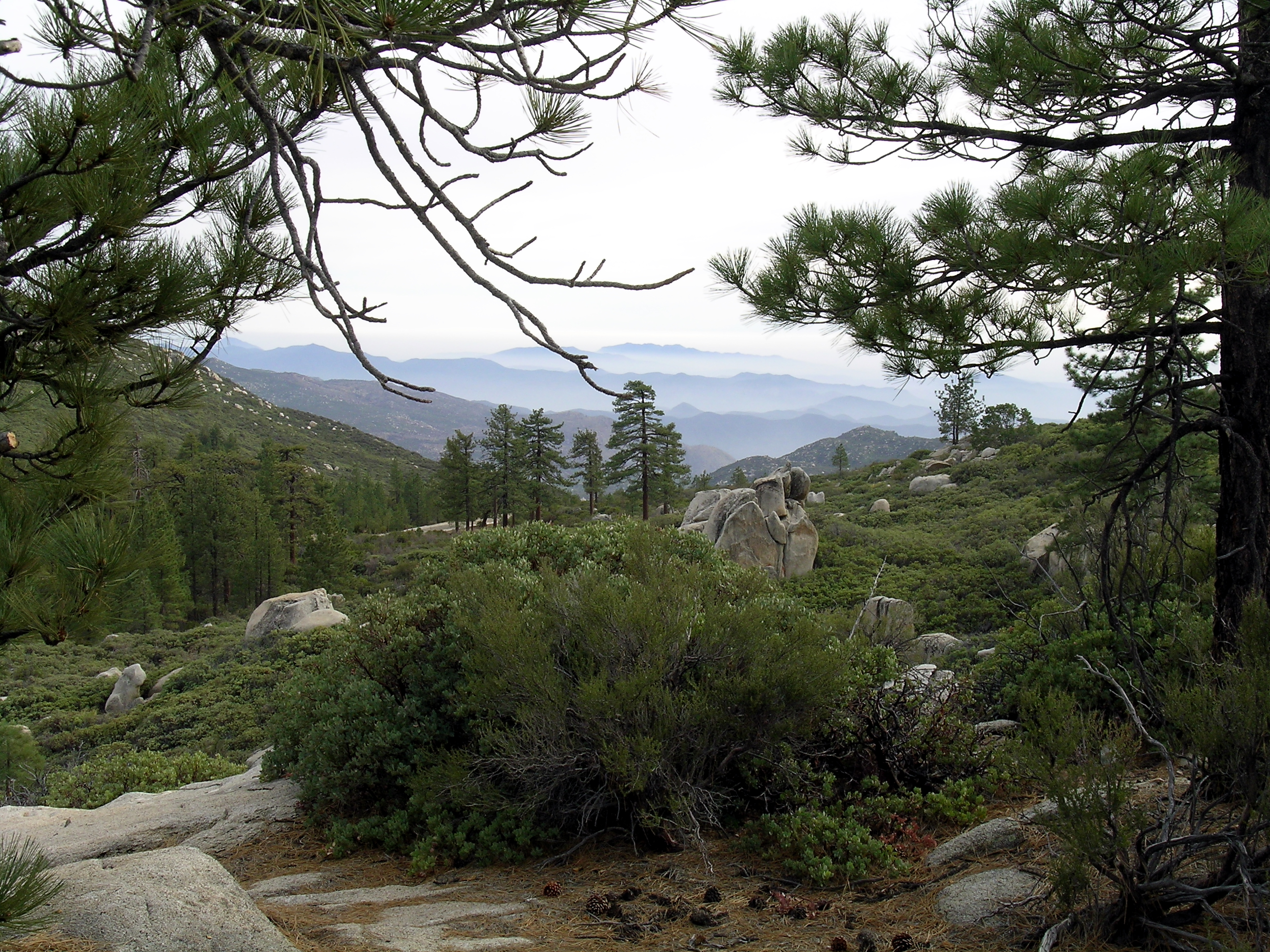
Flora on the east side of the Sierra de San Pedro Mártir

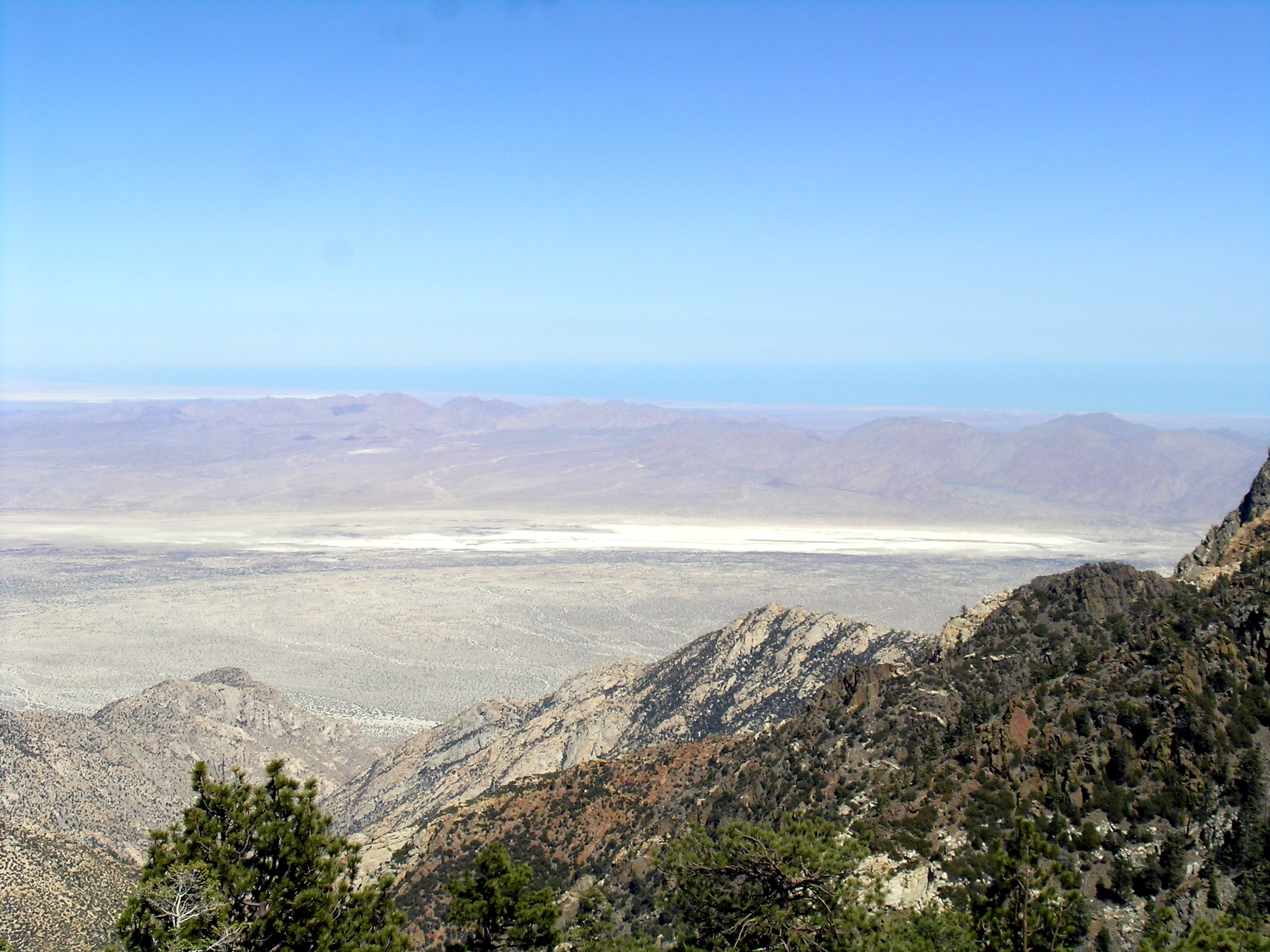
View of the San Felipe Desert and the Gulf of California from the Sierra de San Pedro Mártir

The municipality of San Felipe lies on the northeastern side of the Baja California Peninsula. It borders the municipalities of Mexicali to the north, Ensenada to the northwest, San Quintín to the west and south, and the Gulf of California to the east. The municipality also comprises various islands and islets in the Gulf, such as Roca Consag and the Islas Encantadas, e.g., Isla Coloradito, Isla El Muerto, Isla Encantada, Isla Lobos, and Isla San Luis. The municipality covers an area of 10,808 square kilometres (4,173 sq mi).

The municipality is situated in the San Felipe Desert, which is located in the rain shadow formed by the Sierra de San Pedro Mártir to its west, and is the most arid region of North America. Picacho del Diablo, the highest point in Baja California at 3,095 metres (10,154 ft), lies within the municipality. Average annual precipitation rarely exceeds 70 millimetres (2.8 in).

The southern part of the municipality extends into the Valle de los Cirios wildlife protection area, and the coastline of the northern part of the municipality is protected as part of the Alto Golfo de California Biosphere Reserve.

Climate data for San Felipe weather station at 31°01′39″N 114°50′07″W, 10 m above sea level (1981–2010 averages, 1951–2010 extremes)
Month	Jan	Feb	Mar	Apr	May	Jun	Jul	Aug	Sep	Oct	Nov	Dec	Year
Record high °C (°F)	37.0 (98.6)	40.0 (104.0)	41.0 (105.8)	45.0 (113.0)	49.0 (120.2)	51.0 (123.8)	51.0 (123.8)	49.0 (120.2)	50.0 (122.0)	47.0 (116.6)	48.0 (118.4)	39.0 (102.2)	51.0 (123.8)
Mean daily maximum °C (°F)	20.8 (69.4)	22.3 (72.1)	25.9 (78.6)	29.2 (84.6)	32.7 (90.9)	35.5 (95.9)	37.4 (99.3)	37.5 (99.5)	35.7 (96.3)	31.2 (88.2)	25.7 (78.3)	21.4 (70.5)	29.6 (85.3)
Daily mean °C (°F)	15.0 (59.0)	16.4 (61.5)	19.7 (67.5)	22.2 (72.0)	25.6 (78.1)	28.7 (83.7)	31.3 (88.3)	31.2 (88.2)	29.5 (85.1)	24.6 (76.3)	19.6 (67.3)	15.8 (60.4)	23.3 (73.9)
Mean daily minimum °C (°F)	9.2 (48.6)	10.4 (50.7)	13.5 (56.3)	15.2 (59.4)	18.5 (65.3)	21.9 (71.4)	25.2 (77.4)	24.8 (76.6)	23.3 (73.9)	18.1 (64.6)	13.5 (56.3)	10.1 (50.2)	17.0 (62.6)
Record low °C (°F)	−1.0 (30.2)	0.0 (32.0)	0.0 (32.0)	1.0 (33.8)	5.0 (41.0)	5.0 (41.0)	9.0 (48.2)	10.0 (50.0)	10.0 (50.0)	3.0 (37.4)	−6.0 (21.2)	−2.0 (28.4)	6.0 (42.8)
Average precipitation mm (inches)	1.3 (0.05)	5.6 (0.22)	0.6 (0.02)	0.1 (0.00)	0.3 (0.01)	0.0 (0.0)	1.9 (0.07)	6.9 (0.27)	8.8 (0.35)	7.7 (0.30)	3.4 (0.13)	4.9 (0.19)	41.5 (1.63)
Average rainy days (≥ 1 mm)	0.2	0.7	0.1	0.0	0.0	0.0	0.1	0.3	0.5	0.5	0.2	0.4	3.0
Source: Servicio Meteorológico Nacional

== History ==
The Kiliwa people are the indigenous inhabitants of the area. Historically, they lived in the Sierra de San Pedro Mártir and made annual excursions to San Felipe Bay, where fresh water was available, to supplement their diet with seafood. At San Felipe Bay they gathered clams and mussels, and caught fish using a stone weir built across the entrance to the bay, as well as with hook and line.

San Felipe Bay was named in 1721 by the expedition of the Jesuit missionary Pedro de Ugarte, brother of Juan de Ugarte. Fernando Consag made the first description of the bay in 1746, and Wenceslaus Linck became the first European to reach San Felipe by land in 1766.

Permanent settlement of San Felipe Bay began sometime around 1910–1915 with the establishment of fisheries for totoaba and later shrimp. A highway connecting San Felipe to Mexicali was built in 1950. Diesel generators were installed in the village in 1958, and pipelines for drinking water in 1967.

After citizens demanded the creation of a new municipality for many years, the Congress of Baja California approved the creation of the municipality of San Felipe from territories previously part of the delegación of San Felipe in the municipality of Mexicali, and the delegación of Puertecitos in the municipality of Ensenada. The new municipality came into force on 1 January 2022.

== Administration ==
San Felipe will conduct its first municipal elections in 2024. A transitional administration was appointed by the state in August 2021. Led by its president José Luis Dagnino López, it began operations on 1 January 2022.

== Demographics ==
San Felipe is the least populous municipality in Baja California. The areas which now make up the municipality recorded a population of 18,369 inhabitants in the 2010 Mexican Census. Most of the population lives in the municipal seat of San Felipe which recorded 16,702 inhabitants in 2010, and 17,143 inhabitants in 2020. There are also 130 inhabited rural localities in the municipality.

== Economy and infrastructure ==
Important economic activities in San Felipe include commerce, tourism, real estate, and fishing. San Felipe receives approximately 250,000 visitors per year, including a significant number of American and Canadian retirees.

The municipality is served by Federal Highway 3, which connects it to Ensenada in the northwest, and Federal Highway 5, which connects it to Mexicali in the north and Federal Highway 1 in the south. The port of San Felipe is located just south of the municipal seat and serves both commercial and recreational boats. San Felipe International Airport is located in the municipality, but currently has no commercial service.
