= Isla Roca Lobos =

Island in the Gulf of California

- Location within Mexico

Geography
- Location: Gulf of California
- Coordinates: 28°43′26.82″N 112°57′46.78″W
- Highest elevation: 35 m (115 ft)

Administration
- Mexico
- State: Baja California

Demographics
- Population: uninhabited

Isla Roca Lobos is an island in the Gulf of California east of the Baja California Peninsula. The island is uninhabited and is part of San Felipe Municipality.

== Biology ==
Isla Roca Lobos has two species of reptile, including Sauromalus varius (Piebald Chuckwalla) and Uta stansburiana (Common Side-blotched Lizard).
