= Valle Chico Hot Springs =

Thermal springs in Baja California, Mexico

- San Felipe Hot Springs
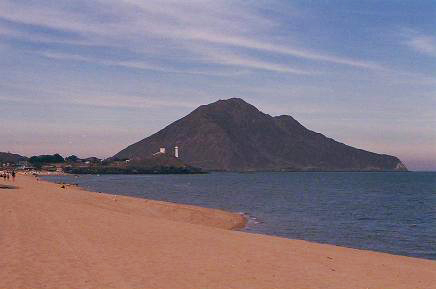
- San Felipe
- Interactive map of Valle Chico Hot Springs
- Location: Near the town of San Felipe, Baja California, Mexico
- Coordinates: 30°38′51″N 115°12′25″W
- Elevation: 2,041 ft (622 m)
- Type: geothermal
- Temperature: 2,041 feet

Valle Chico Hot Springs is a subaerial thermal spring located at in the Sierra San Pedro Martir mountains of Baja California, Mexico.

== Location ==
The springs are located Southwest of the town of San Felipe at an elevation of 2,041 feet. The GPS coordinates are N 30 38.85 W 115 12.41. There is a ramada, fence and line shack at the location. Wildlife in the area include bobcats, pumas, coyotes, wild pigs, mountain sheep, fox, ringtails, racoons, badgers, and jackrabbits.

== Water profile ==
The hot mineral water emerges from a meteoric source at 144°F and flows into a cold water stream, cooling the water in a nearby soaking area to 110°F. The mineral waters are alkaline with a pH from 8.5 to 8.8. A 1988 study (Giggenbach, 1988) states that a Na/K geothermometer measured temperatures between 136 °C and 169 °C.

== See also ==
- List of hot springs in the United States
- List of hot springs in the world
