= Isla Lagartija =

Island in Mexico

- Location within Baja California Location within Mexico

Geography
- Location: Gulf of California
- Coordinates: 28°44′1.91″N 112°57′58.72″W
- Highest elevation: 20 m (70 ft)

Administration
- Mexico
- State: Baja California

Demographics
- Population: uninhabited

Isla Lagartija, is an island in the Gulf of California off the Baja California Peninsula. The island is uninhabited and is part of the Mexicali Municipality.

== Biology ==
Isla Lagartija has only one species of reptile, the Common Side-blotched Lizard (Uta stansburiana).
