= Salsipuedes =

Salsipuedes (Spanish for "get out if you can") may refer to:

- Salsipuedes: a Tale of Love, War and Anchovies, a 2004 opera by Daniel Catán
- Salsipuedes (film), a 2016 Panamanian film directed by Ricardo Aguilar Navarro
- Salsipuedes Massacre, an 1831 killing in Uruguay
- Isla Salsipuedes, an island in the Gulf of California
- Rancho Cañada de Salsipuedes, a Mexican land grant in present-day Santa Barbara County, California
- Rancho Salsipuedes, a Mexican land grant in present day Santa Cruz County, California

== See also ==
- Salsipuedes Creek (disambiguation)
