= Isla Encantada =

Uninhibited Island in the Gulf of California

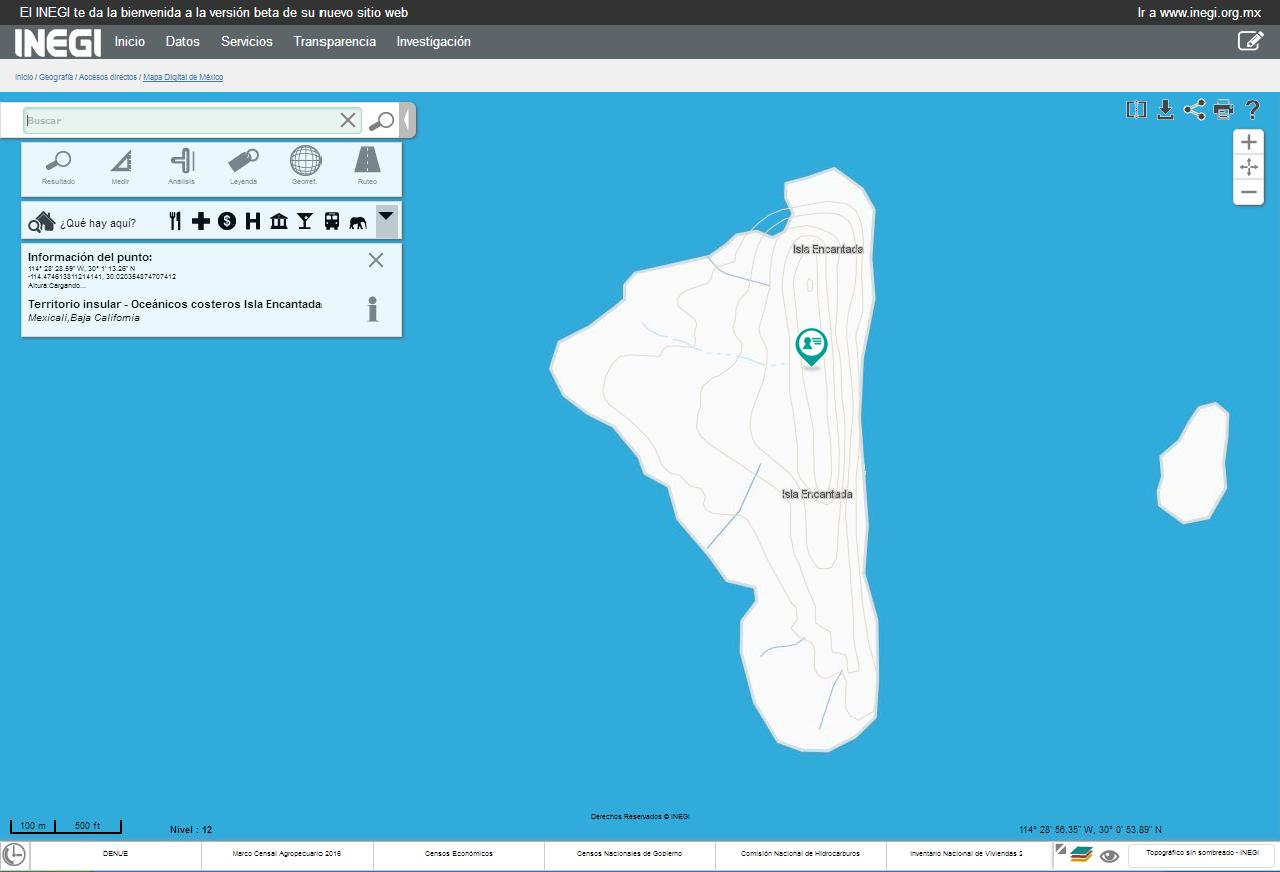
- Isla Encantada

- Location within Mexico

Geography
- Location: Gulf of California
- Coordinates: 30°01′10.94″N 114°28′31.45″W
- Highest elevation: 125 m (410 ft)

Administration
- Mexico
- State: Baja California

Demographics
- Population: uninhabited

Isla Encantada is an island in the Gulf of California east of the Baja California Peninsula. The island is uninhabited and is part of San Felipe Municipality.

== Biology ==
Isla Encantada has only one endemic species of reptile, the Enchanted Side-blotched Lizard (Uta encantadae).
