= Puertecitos =

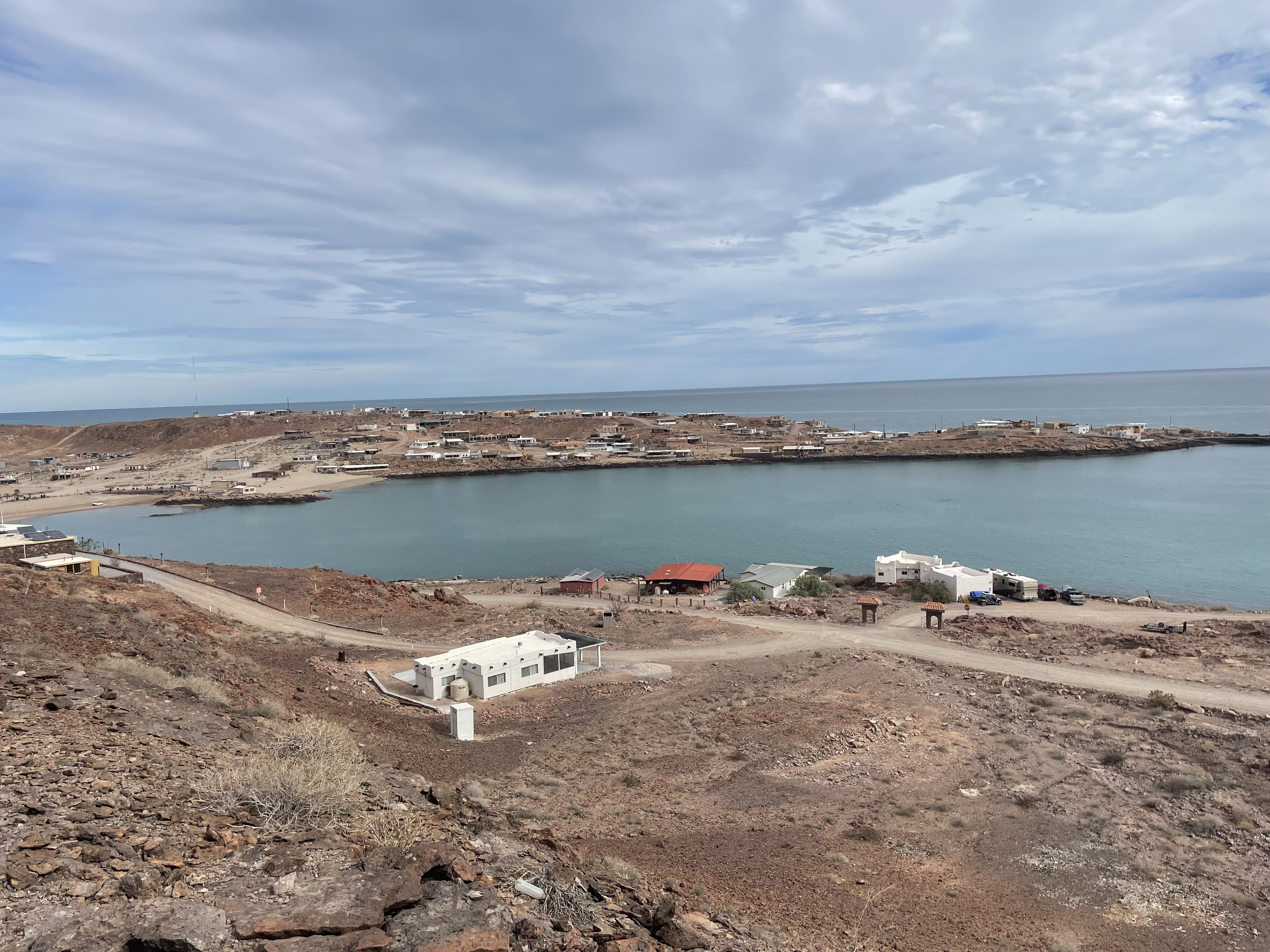

- Location in Mexico
- Coordinates: 30°21′02″N 114°38′30″W
- Country: Mexico
- State: Baja California
- Municipality: San Felipe
- Elevation: 15 m (49 ft)

Population (2010)
  - City: 41
  - Urban: 0
- Time zone: UTC-8 (Northwest US Pacific)
  - Summer (DST): UTC-7 (Northwest)

The town of Puertecitos is located 90 kilometers south of San Felipe, in the Mexican state of Baja California. Puertecitos is a tourist spot for both vacationers and expatriates from the United States. The Puertecitos bay, which was permanently settled in 1949 by Rafael Orozco, overlooks the Gulf of California. There are a couple of hundred homes and mobile homes in Puertecitos, mostly lying on a low hill which overlooks the Gulf of California on the east side, and the inner bay of Puertecitos on the west side.

Puertecitos receives an average of two inches of rain a year, and has the same climate as San Felipe.

Puertecitos Hot springs

Puertecitos is known primarily for its hot springs on the rocky coastline and being a tourist destination. There is a fee to use the Puertecitos Campo which controls access to the natural hot springs and is still run by Rafael's Daughter - Clara. The hot springs contain man modified rock and concrete pools of sulphur water which reach 70C before it mixes with the incoming tide, cooling the temperature. They are accessed by walking down a small but steep hill and not considered handicap accessible.

Campo Puertecitos has a several palapas with picnic tables and running water using a tinaco. It also has a restaurant which serves traditional Baja food. There are not yet hotel accommodations but they are actively being built. Gas is not available at the Puertecitos Pemex station, as it is no longer in operation. It is advisable to fill up with gas in San Felipe prior to driving to Puertecitos. San Louis Gonzaga is the next available Gas station south of Puertecitos on MEX-5. Puertecitos also has a small local market - Pez Market - with typical sundry supplies, as well as, fresh fruits, vegetables, meats, cheese, sodas, beer and drinking water. There are different places to beach camp in the area with a small fee, including the Puertecitos Campo it's self, as well as, Campo La Toba. Bahia Cristina's, which is located 6.4 kilometres (4.0 mi) south, has a traditional Baja style restaurant and beach camping with palaps.

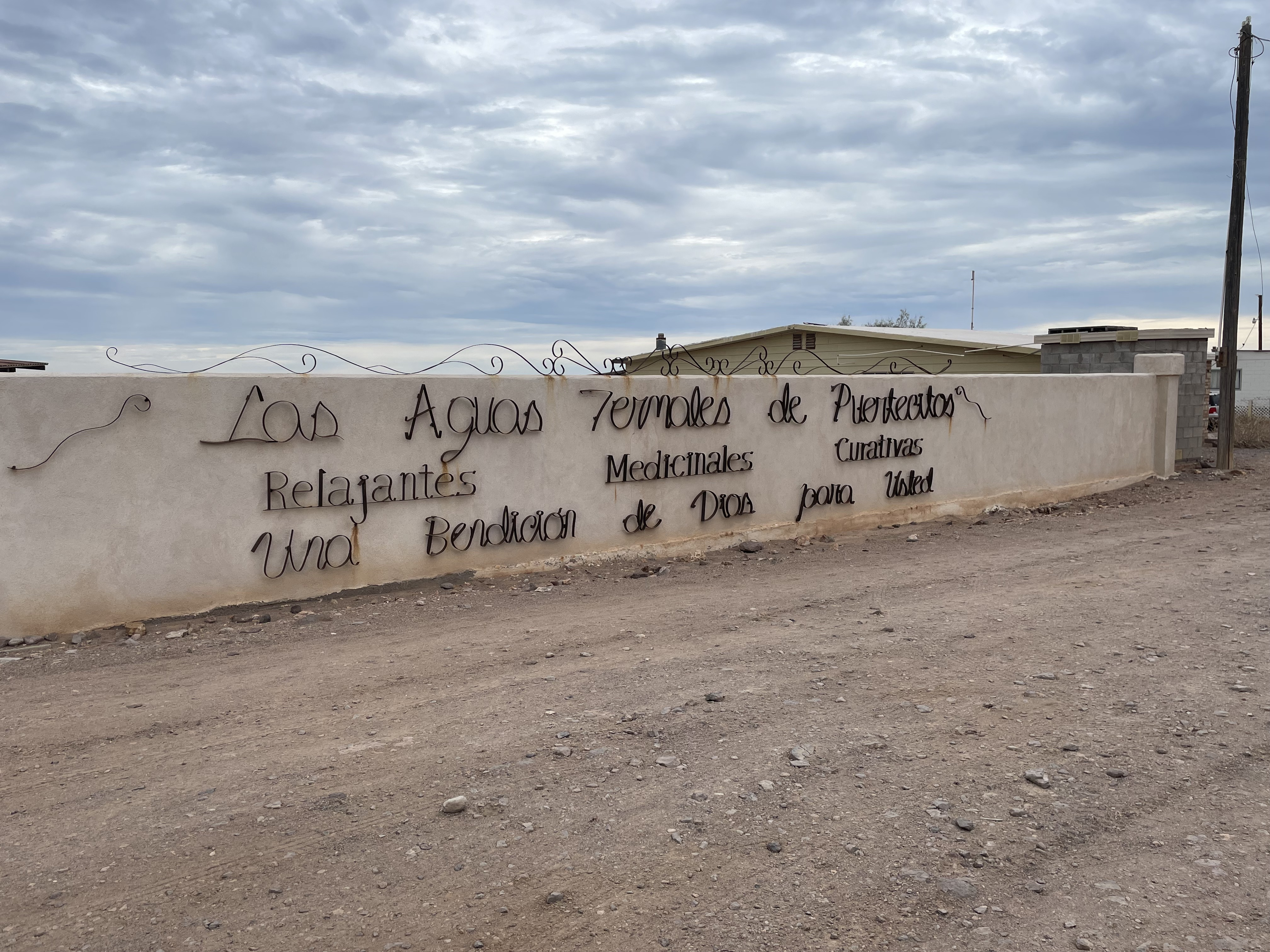
