= San Pedro side-blotched lizard =

Conservation status
- Vulnerable (IUCN 3.1)

Scientific classification
- Kingdom: Animalia
- Phylum: Chordata
- Class: Reptilia
- Order: Squamata
- Suborder: Iguania
- Family: Phrynosomatidae
- Genus: Uta
- Species: U. palmeri

Binomial name
- Uta palmeri Stejneger, 1890

Species of lizard

The San Pedro side-blotched lizard (Uta palmeri), also known commonly as mancha lateral de San Pedro Mártir in Mexican Spanish, is a species of lizard in the family Phrynosomatidae. The species is endemic to Mexico.

== Etymology ==
The specific name, palmeri, is in honor of American zoologist Theodore Sherman Palmer.

== Geographic distribution ==
Uta palmeri is found in the Mexican state of Sonora, on San Pedro Mártir Island (Isla San Pedro Mártir), an island in the Gulf of California (Sea of Cortés).

== Habitat ==
The preferred natural habitats of Uta palmeri are the intertidal zone and rocky hillsides.

== Behavior ==
Uta palmeri is terrestrial.

== Diet ==
For much of the year Uta palmeri eats mostly plant matter. However, during the nesting season of the blue-footed booby (Sula nebouxii) on the island, the lizard eats fish scraps dropped by the birds and flies attracted to the guano of the birds.

== Reproduction ==
Uta palmeri is oviparous.
