= SeaPort Airlines (2008–2016) =

American regional airline

SeaPort Airlines, Inc.
IATA	ICAO	Call sign
K5	SQH	SASQUATCH
- Commenced operations: June 5, 2008; 18 years ago
- Ceased operations: September 20, 2016; 10 years ago
- Hubs: Portland International Airport; Memphis International Airport
- Destinations: 7
- Parent company: SeaPort Airlines, Inc.
- Headquarters: Portland International Airport (Portland, Oregon)
- Key people: Kent Craford (co-founder); Timothy Sieber (President); John Beardsley (CEO); David Perlitz (Joint-Director of Station Operations; Noel McDermott (Director of Operations); James Beebe (Chief Pilot)

SeaPort Airlines was a US-based regional airline with its headquarters at Portland International Airport in Portland, Oregon. It operated scheduled service from its bases at Portland International Airport, Memphis International Airport, San Diego International Airport, and Hollywood Burbank Airport, as well as international service to San Felipe International Airport. For most of its history, the airline focused on federally subsidized Essential Air Service flights to rural airports.

SeaPort Airlines pilots used the call sign "Sasquatch" to communicate with air traffic controllers. The carrier played off this in early 2013 when it introduced "Roger, The SeaPort Airlines Sasquatch" as its mascot.

== History ==
The airline began in 2008 as a provider of commuter flights between Portland International Airport (PDX) and King County International Airport (Boeing Field) in Seattle, but later changed its business model to emphasize federally subsidized Essential Air Service (EAS) flights to various rural airports.

SeaPort operated scheduled service from its bases at PDX (Pacific Northwest region) and Memphis International Airport (MEM) (Mid-South region). It also operated a Southwest region from San Diego International Airport (SAN) and Hollywood Burbank Airport (BUR), as well as international service to San Felipe International Airport (SFH), the airport's most recent commercial service, from 2013 to January 2016.

As of November 2013, SeaPort Airlines received $13,879,930 in annual federal EAS subsidies.

On February 5, 2016, the airline announced it had filed for voluntary Chapter 11 bankruptcy after being forced to reduce its route network. Normal day-to-day operations were set to continue during the company reorganization. The company filed a plan to emerge from Chapter 11 on July 12, 2016. However, on September 20, 2016, the company went out of business after its Chapter 11 bankruptcy was converted to a Chapter 7 liquidation.

In 2025, co-founder Kent Craford—who left the airline in 2009—attributed its eventual collapse to the decision to focus on EAS flights, which he characterized as "notoriously unprofitable".

=== Regional operations ===
SeaPort Airlines operated scheduled commuter service in two distinct geographical areas connecting rural communities to the national transportation network: the Pacific Northwest with destinations in Portland and Eastern Oregon Regional Airport in Pendleton, Oregon and the Mid-South including South Arkansas Regional Airport at Goodwin Field in El Dorado, Boone County Airport in Harrison, and Memorial Field Airport in Hot Springs, Arkansas as well as George Bush Intercontinental Airport (IAH) in Houston, Texas.

Until January 2016 the airline also had a Southwest region with destinations in California and Mexico.

=== Pacific Northwest service ===
SeaPort's Pacific Northwest Service at its Portland International Airport (PDX) hub was historically targeted at commuters between Seattle and Portland wishing to avoid congestion at the larger Seattle-Tacoma International Airport and the main commercial terminal at Portland International Airport. In late 2011, SeaPort began to reinvent its business model and the carrier ended its namesake route between Seattle (Boeing Field) and Portland on January 27, 2012.

As part of this business shift, on January 15, 2012, SeaPort Airlines began nonstop flights between Portland International Airport and North Bend/Coos Bay utilizing Cessna 208 Caravan single turboprop engine aircraft.

On October 21, 2008, SeaPort Airlines was awarded a two-year EAS grant to provide commercial service from Portland to Eastern Oregon Regional Airport in Pendleton, Oregon, beginning December 1, 2008, replacing subsidized service by Horizon Air.

On March 20, 2016, SeaPort Airlines ceased service to North Bend/Coos Bay, and PenAir began service on March 21.

=== Mid-South service ===
All of SeaPort's Mid-South service based at Memphis International Airport was federally subsidized under EAS.

On March 12, 2010, SeaPort won a two-year EAS contract to provide three daily flights Sunday through Friday between Salina, Kansas and Kansas City International Airport and between Hot Springs, Arkansas and Memphis International Airport. As part of this growth SeaPort secured Department of Transportation approval to add daily flights between Kansas City International Airport and Harrison, Arkansas. In July 2011, SeaPort began service to Dallas Love Field from El Dorado and Hot Springs.

In February 2013, SeaPort Airlines announced that its EAS contract for service to McKellar-Sipes Regional Airport in Jackson, Tennessee, had been extended by the U.S. Department of Transportation through January 31, 2014. The carrier had been awarded a one-year (rather than the typical two-year) contract due to the low number of passengers that used the flights operated by the previous carrier providing EAS, which had put Jackson's continued eligibility for subsidized air service at risk. Service was extended but ended on June 26, 2015.

By July, 2014, EAS service began to Great Bend, Kansas with flights to Kansas City and Wichita, Kansas. The Wichita flights ended by April, 2015.

In November, 2014, Seaport began service from Memphis and Nashville to Tupelo, Mississippi and on January 12, 2015 service began from Nashville to Muscle Shoals, Alabama, both under EAS contracts. Both had ended in late 2015.

Following the 2014 phaseout of the Wright Amendment and the opening of a new terminal at Dallas Love Field, SeaPort had to share a single gate with Virgin America and lost its access to a permanent ticket counter; the resulting inconvenience and flight delays prompted SeaPort to transfer the Texas–Arkansas flights from Love Field to George Bush Intercontinental Airport in Houston in September 2015.

On January 16, 2016, SeaPort ceased service to Salina, Great Bend, and Kansas City, citing a nationwide shortage of regional airline pilots.

=== Southwest service ===
On May 1, 2013, the airline began service connecting Imperial/El Centro to San Diego and Burbank. The EAS contract was awarded to SeaPort in January 2013, replacing the incumbent carrier SkyWest Airlines, which linked Imperial to Los Angeles.

In July 2014, SeaPort Airlines announced it would begin nonstop service between Burbank and San Diego on October 1, with four weekday flights each way, and reduced service on weekends.

Later the airline added service to Sacramento and Visalia as well as its first international destination, San Felipe in Mexico.

SeaPort ceased all operations in California and Mexico on January 15, 2016.

== Fleet ==
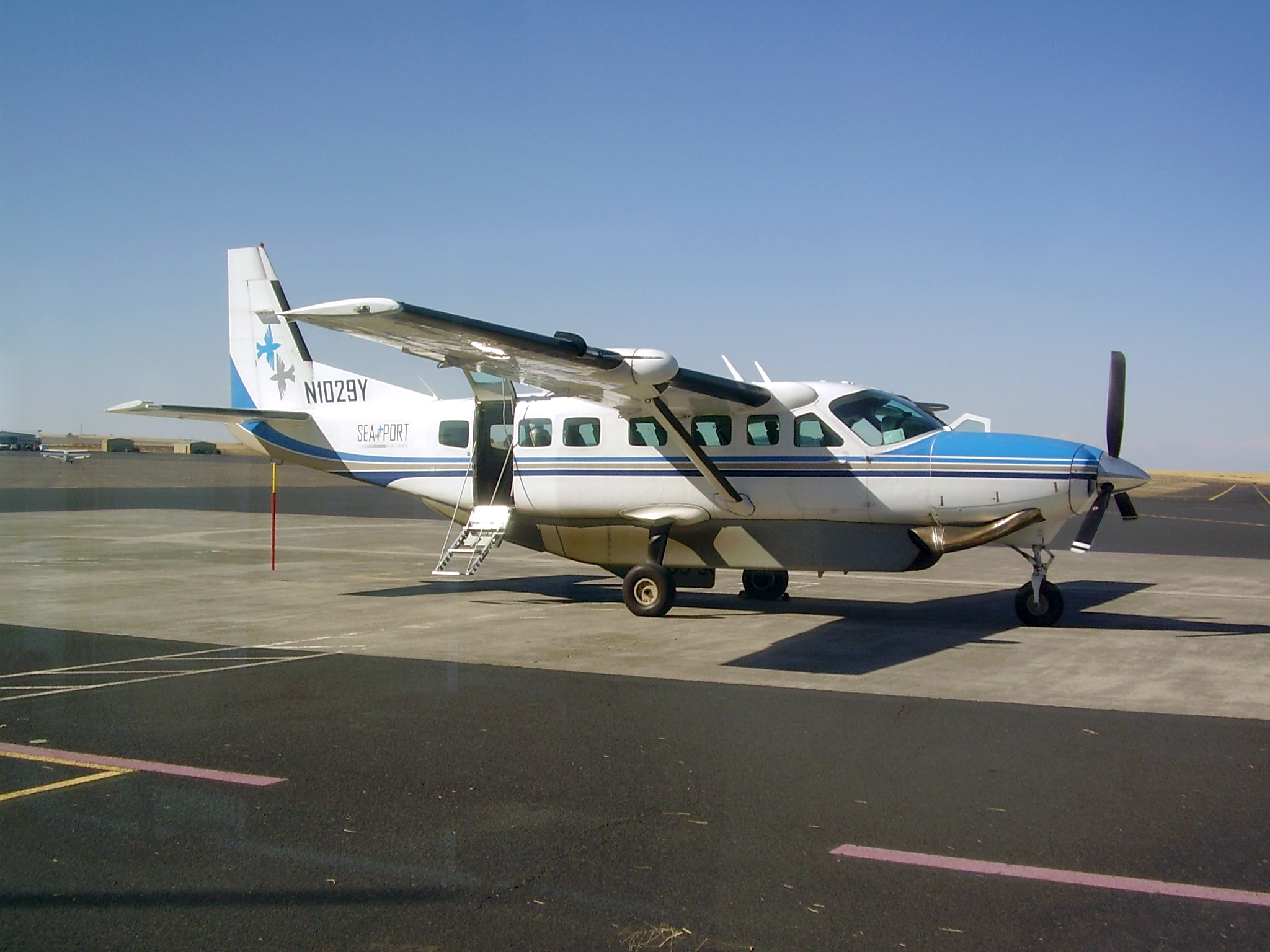
Cessna 208 N1029Y of SeaPort Airlines at Eastern Oregon Regional Airport in October 2015

Seaport Airlines operated the Pilatus PC-12 and the Cessna 208 Caravan.

== See also ==
- List of defunct airlines of the United States
