= Salsipuedes Creek =

Salsipuedes Creek is the name of several streams in California. "Salsipuedes" means "leave if you can" in Spanish.

== Waterways in the United States ==
- Salsipuedes Creek (Pajaro River), a tributary of the Pajaro River in Santa Cruz County, California
- Salsipuedes Creek (Salinas River), a tributary of the Santa Margarita Lake, a reservoir on the Salinas River in San Luis Obispo County, California; see Salinas Dam
- Salsipuedes Creek (Santa Ynez River tributary), a tributary of the Santa Ynez River in Santa Barbara County, California

== See also ==
- Salsipuedes (disambiguation)
