= Isla Mejia =

Island in the Gulf of California

- Location within Mexico

Geography
- Location: Gulf of California
- Coordinates: 29°33′26.84″N 113°34′14.84″W
- Area: 2.1 km^{2} (0.81 sq mi)
- Highest elevation: 240 m (790 ft)

Administration
- Mexico
- State: Baja California

Demographics
- Population: uninhabited

Isla Mejia is an island in the Gulf of California east of the Baja California Peninsula. The island is uninhabited and is part of the Mexicali Municipality.

== Biology ==
Isla Mejia has six species of reptiles: Hypsiglena ochrorhyncha (coast night snake), Lichanura trivirgata (rosy boa), Petrosaurus slevini (Slevin's banded rock lizard), Phyllodactylus nocticolus (peninsular leaf-toed gecko), Sauromalus hispidus (spiny chuckwalla), and Uta stansburiana (common side-blotched lizard).
