= Isla San Pedro Nolasco lizard =

Conservation status
- Least Concern (IUCN 3.1)

Scientific classification
- Kingdom: Animalia
- Phylum: Chordata
- Class: Reptilia
- Order: Squamata
- Suborder: Iguania
- Family: Phrynosomatidae
- Genus: Uta
- Species: U. nolascensis

Binomial name
- Uta nolascensis Van Denburgh & Slevin, 1921

Species of lizard

The Isla San Pedro Nolasco lizard (Uta nolascensis) is a species of lizard. Its range is in Mexico.
