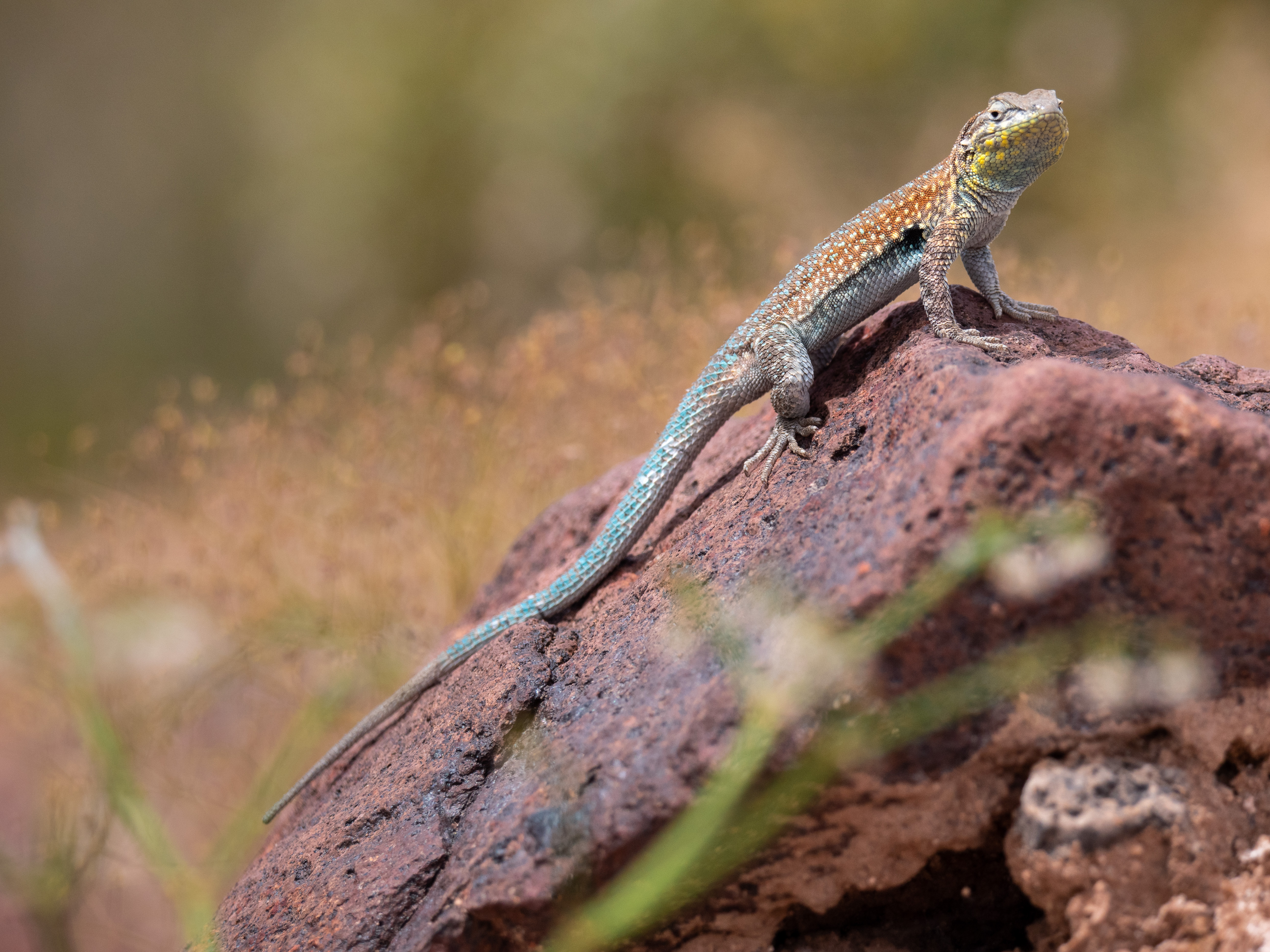
- Male common side-blotched lizard (Uta stansburiana)

Scientific classification
- Kingdom: Animalia
- Phylum: Chordata
- Class: Reptilia
- Order: Squamata
- Suborder: Iguania
- Family: Phrynosomatidae
- Genus: Uta; Baird & Girard, 1852

Species
- Several, see text

= Side-blotched lizard =

Side-blotched lizards

Genus of lizards

Side-blotched lizards are lizards of the genus Uta. They are some of the most abundant and commonly observed lizards in the deserts of western North America, known for cycling between three colorized breeding patterns and best described by the common side-blotched lizard. They commonly grow to 6 inches including the tail, with the males normally being the larger sex. Males often have bright throat colors.

These lizards are prey for many desert species. Snakes, larger lizards, and birds all make formidable predators to side-blotched lizards. Larger lizard species, such as collared, leopard, and spiny lizards, and roadrunners are the main predators. In turn, the side-blotched lizards eat arthropods, such as insects, spiders, and occasionally scorpions.

As a result of their high predation rate, these lizards are very prolific breeders. From April to June, they breed, with the young emerging as early as late May. These inch-long (2.54 cm) young appear all through the summer, and into September.

The diploid chromosome number in most if not all species is 34, consisting of 12 macro- and 22 microchromosomes.

== Sex ==
Side-blotched lizards are notable for having the highest number of distinct male and female morphs within a species: three male and two female. They show a diversity of behaviors associated with reproduction, which are often referred to as "alternative reproductive tactics".

Orange-throated females lay many small eggs and are very territorial. Yellow-throated females lay fewer, larger eggs, and are more tolerant of each other.

Orange-throated males are "ultra-dominant, high testosterone" males that establish large territories and control areas that contain multiple females. Yellow stripe-throated males ("sneakers") do not defend a territory but cluster on the fringes of orange-throated lizard territories and mate with the females on those territories while the orange-throat is absent, as the territory to defend is large. Blue-throated males are less aggressive and guard only one or two females; they can fend off the yellow stripe-throated males, but cannot withstand attacks by orange-throated males.

This is called the rock paper scissors effect, borrowed from the name of the playground game, because the outcome of the mating success shows that one morph of the lizard takes advantage over another but not over the third.

In 1996, herpetologists Sinervo and Lively published a mathematical model of the three-part male lizard game. At the time, they assumed that the three color morphs reflected three different genotypes. After years of piecing together a side-blotched lizard genome and the spread of more accurate methods of genetic analysis in 2012, a team led by Lively and biologist Ammon Corl finally found that the three color morphs come from just two alleles, O and B: The orange from the recessive homozygous OO genotype and both blue and yellow from the OB and BB genotypes. Yellow morph males can change to blue males, but they cannot later change back.

The orange and blue-throated males can sometimes be seen approaching a human "intruder". One speculation is that he could be giving the female(s) a chance to escape, but whether he is defending the female has not been documented. Another speculation is that he is highly motivated to engage whenever he sees movement on his territory, which he may be interpreting as a possible intruding male, or another female.

The blue female morphs behave similar to yellow female morphs instead of orange female morphs.

== Systematics ==
The systematics and phylogeny of the side-blotched lizards is very confusing, with many local forms and morphs having been described as full species. Following the 1997 review of Upton and Murphy, which included new data from mtDNA cytochrome b and ATPase 6 sequences, the following species can be recognized pending further research:

- Enchanted side-blotched lizard, U. encantadae
- Dead side-blotched lizard, U. lowei
- Isla San Pedro Nolasco lizard, U. nolascensis
- San Pedro side-blotched lizard, U. palmeri
- Isla Santa Catalina side-blotched lizard, U. squamata
- Common side-blotched lizard, U. stansburiana
  - Western side-blotched lizard, U. (stansburiana) elegans
  - Nevada side-blotched lizard, U. (stansburiana) nevadensis
  - Northern side-blotched lizard, U. (stansburiana) stansburiana
  - Eastern side-blotched lizard, U. (stansburiana) stejnegeri
  - Plateau side-blotched lizard, U. (stansburiana) uniformis
- Swollen-nosed side-blotched lizard, U. tumidarostra

== See also ==
- Paracerceis sculpta: Males are polymorphic and exist in 3 forms, α, β, and γ of different sizes.
