= Digestive rate model =

Model in behavioral ecology

The digestive rate model (DRM) (of foraging) is related to optimal foraging theory in that the model describes the diet selection that animals should perform in order to maximize the energy (or nutrients) available to them. It differs from the main body of Optimal Foraging Theory in stating that animals can select food in order to make optimal use of their digestive tract (maximize digestion rate) rather than the maximization of the food ingestion rate, which is the base of Optimal foraging theory.

The basic tenet of the DRM is that the intake of energy by an animal passes through two consecutive processes, food ingestion or foraging, and food digestion. Optimal foraging theory describes the diet selection if the food ingestion rate is the limiting factor. The DRM describes diet selection and foraging behavior if digestion is the rate limiting process. Food can consist of varying fractions of largely indigestible parts such as fibre in plant material, shells of molluscs or insect chitin, which can be thought of as 'rate limiting' for the digestion process or somewhat more intuitively as 'bulk' that takes up capacity that can be spent better for material with a higher digestibility.

The original description of the model positioned the DRM as an alternative to the contingency model (CM) of optimal foraging and pointed out that some of the predictions of the DRM provide a better match than did the CM with observed diet choice and behavior of e.g. herbivores. The DRM went largely unnoticed, but a 2004 paper by Van Gils describes how red knots Calidris canutus forage based on digestive bottlenecks and confirmed their foraging according to the DRM rather than the CM model of optimal foraging. The case is particularly interesting as a major difference in individual foraging behavior is related to a large intraspecific difference in the digestive tract of the knots.

== See also ==
- Behavioral ecology
- Human behavioral ecology
- Optimal foraging
