= San Felipe International Airport =

Airport in San Felipe, Baja California, Mexico

San Felipe International Airport Aeropuerto Internacional de San Felipe
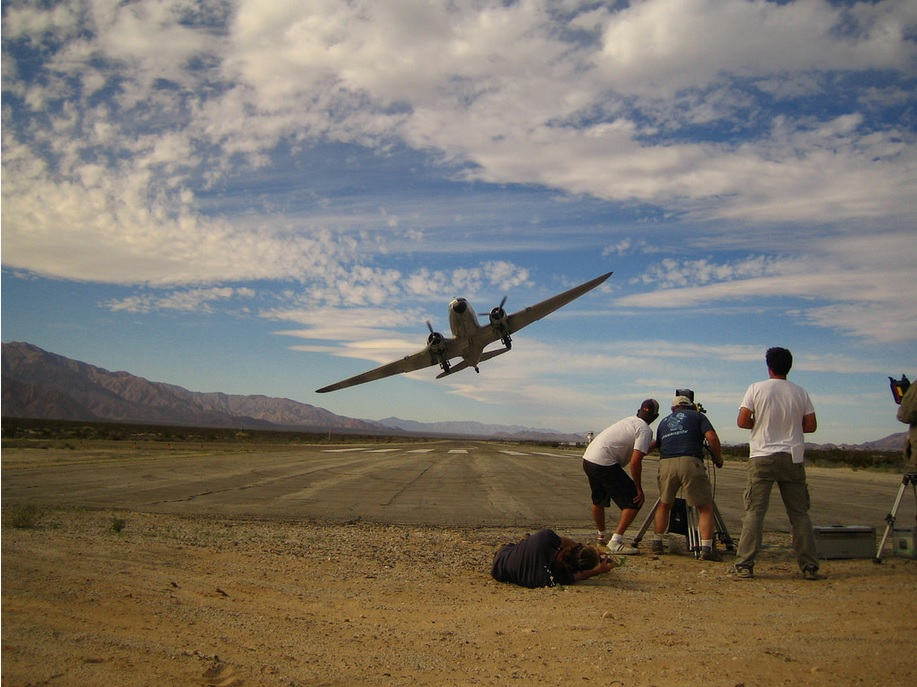
- IATA: SFH; ICAO: MMSF; LID: SFE

Summary
- Airport type: Public
- Operator: Patronato para la Administración del Aeropuerto de San Felipe
- Serves: San Felipe, Baja California, Mexico
- Time zone: PST (UTC-08:00)
  - Summer (DST): PST (UTC-07:00)
- Elevation AMSL: 30 m / 98 ft
- Coordinates: 30°55′49″N 114°48′59″W

Map
- Location of airport in Baja California SFH (Mexico)

Runways
Direction	Length		Surface
Direction	m	ft	Surface
13/31	1,622	5,322	Asphalt

Statistics (2023)
- Total passengers: N/A
- Ranking in Mexico: N/A
- Source: Agencia Federal de Aviación su primer comandante Capitan. Jose Oscar Valencia Quiroz Civil

San Felipe International Airport (Spanish: Aeropuerto Internacional de San Felipe) (IATA: SFH, ICAO: MMSF) is a small international airport located 11 km (6.8 mi) south of San Felipe, Baja California, Mexico. It handles the air traffic for San Felipe. Operated by the state-owned Patronato para la Administración del Aeropuerto de San Felipe, the airport has experienced intermittent service by regional airlines, offering seasonal flights within the region. Between 2014 and 2016, the airport operated flights to San Diego, operated by SeaPort Airlines. However, since 2016, its services have been limited to handling flight training, executive, and general aviation activities. The airport does not offer scheduled passenger public flights. The closest airport providing commercial flights is Mexicali International Airport, located 182 kilometres (113 mi) north of San Felipe.

The airport is situated at an elevation of 30 m (98 ft) above mean sea level. It features a single asphalt runway, designated as 13/31, measuring 1,622 by 30 m (5,322 by 98 ft). The commercial aviation apron spans 13,275 m^{2} (142,890 sq ft), featuring two parking positions for small aircraft, helipads and additional stands for general aviation.

The passenger terminal features arrival and departure facilities for domestic flights within a single-story building, with gates allowing passengers to walk to their aircraft. Adjacent facilities include small hangars and facilities for general aviation.

== See also ==
- List of the busiest airports in Mexico
- List of airports in Mexico
- List of airports by ICAO code: M
- List of busiest airports in North America
- List of the busiest airports in Latin America
- Transportation in Mexico
- Tourism in Mexico
- Mexical International Airport
