= San Felipe, Baja California =

City in the Mexican state of Baja California

San Felipe, Baja California Juwiy mja' (Kiliwa)
- City
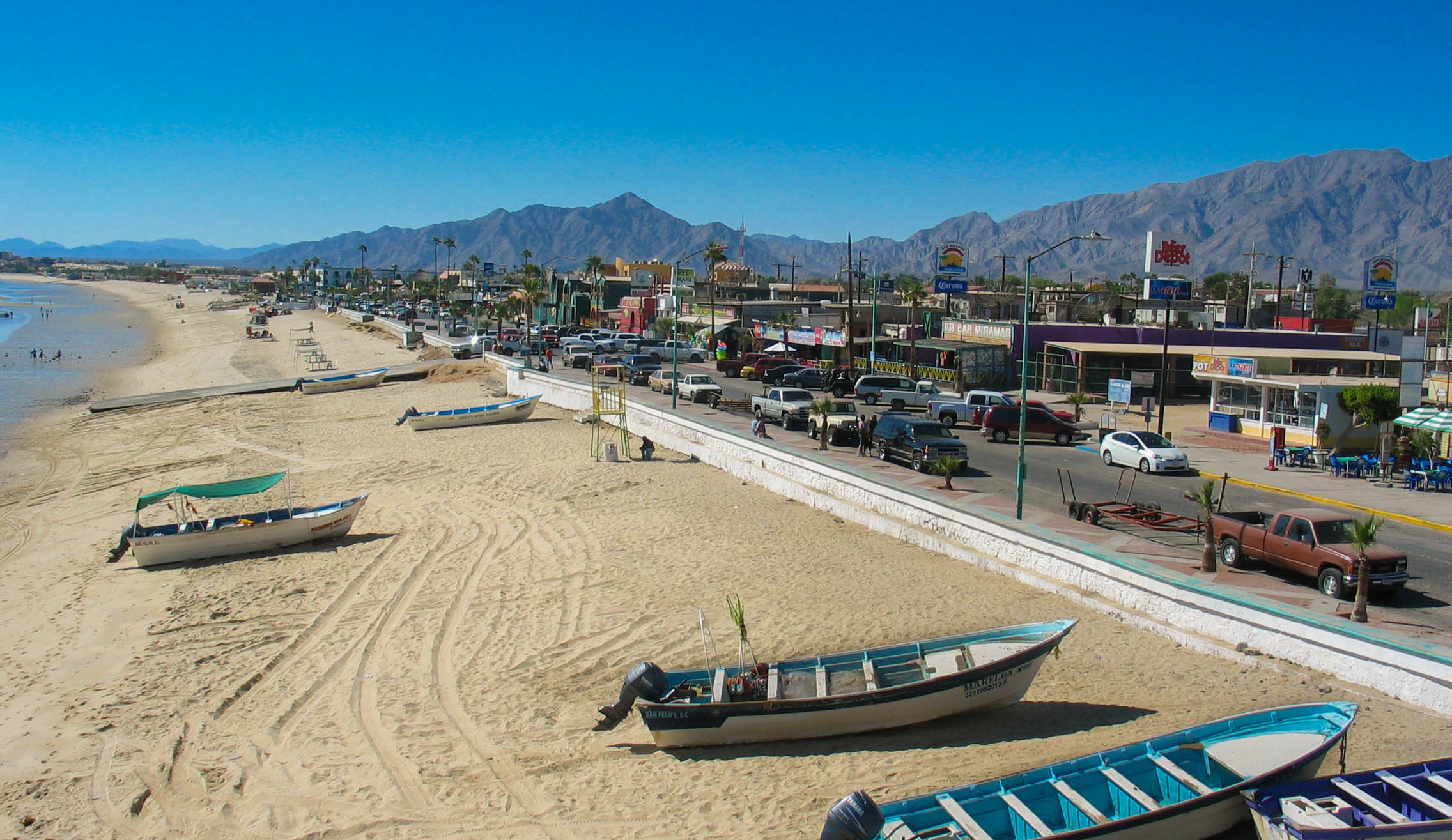
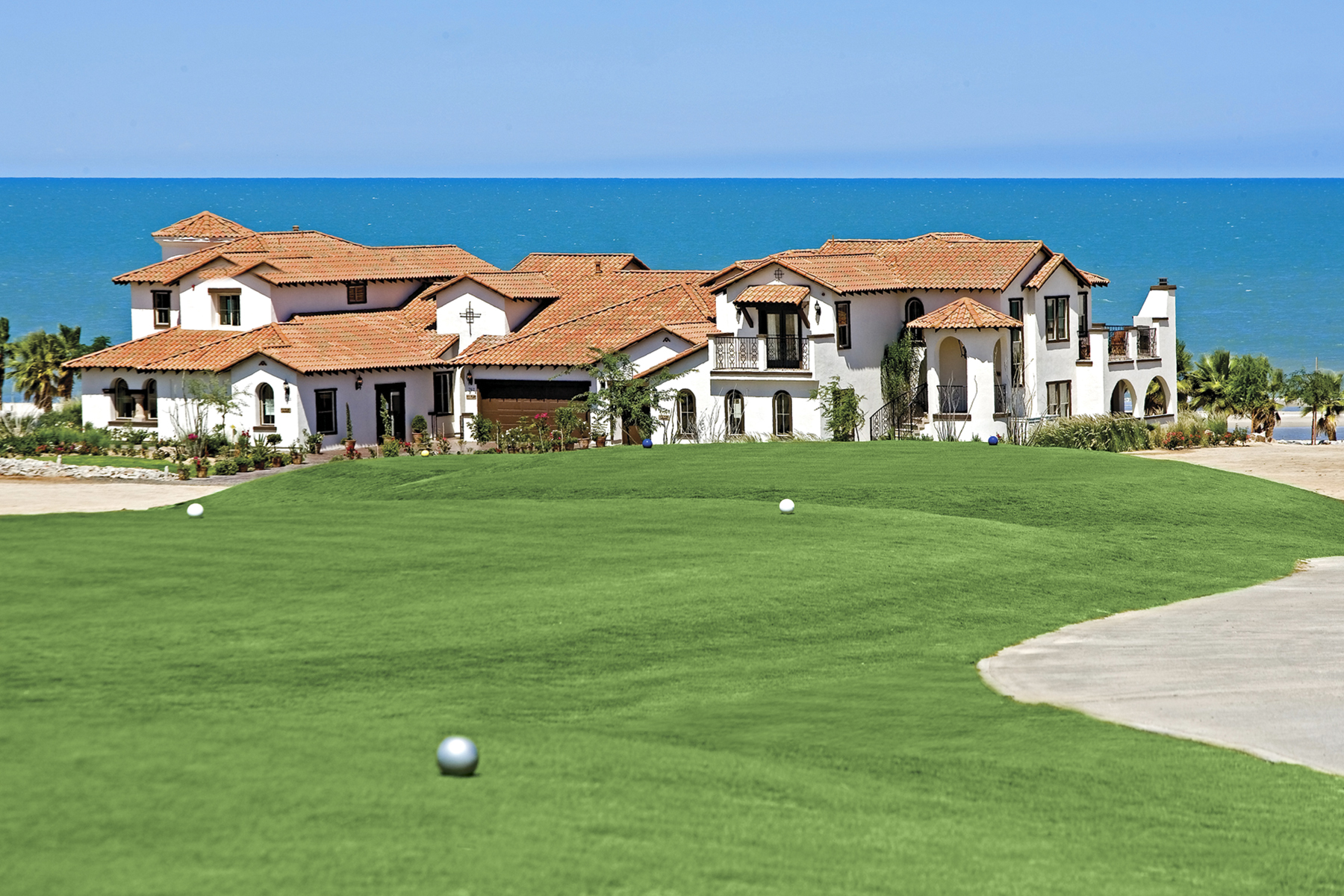
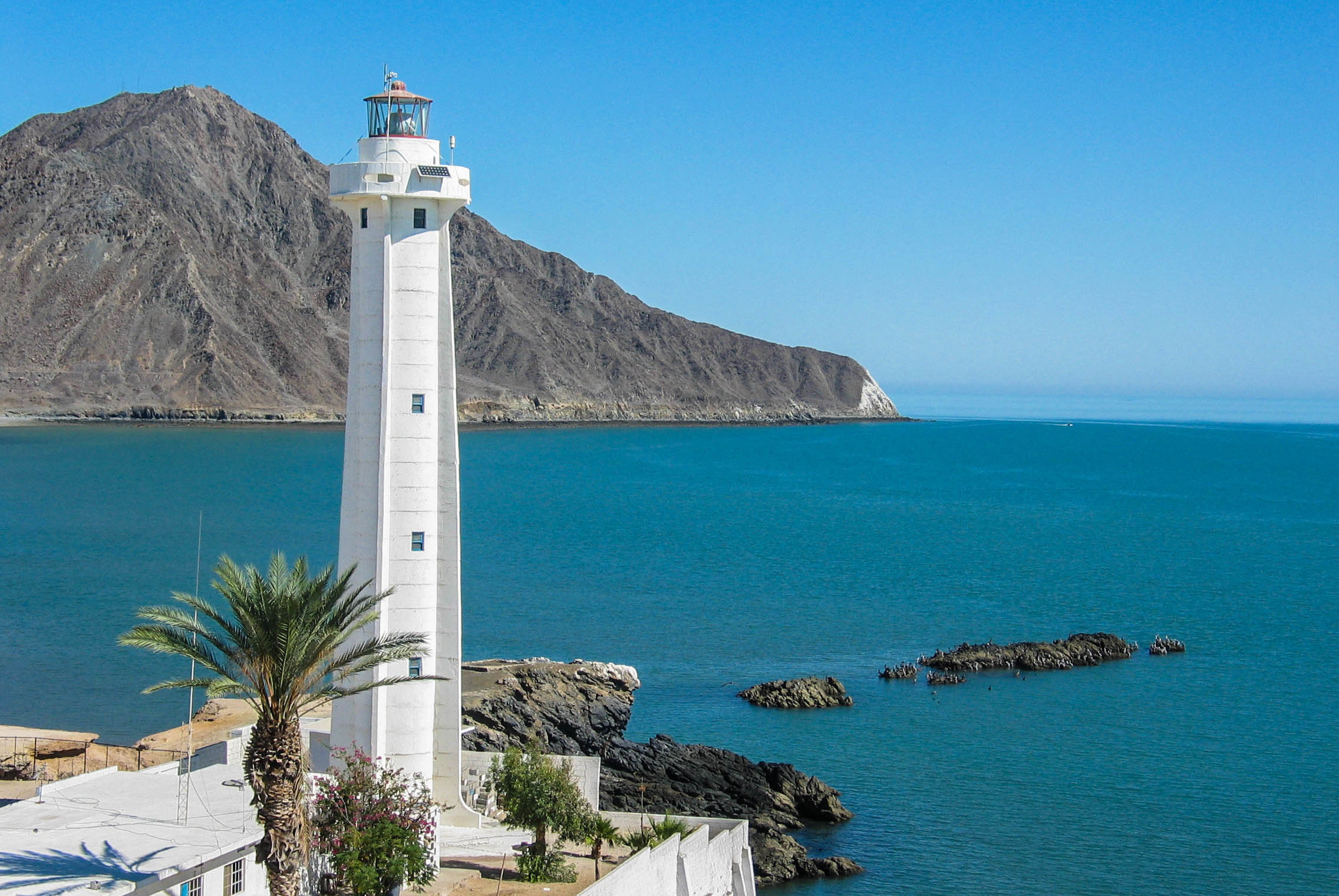
- Top: Malecón de San Felipe; bottom: La Ventana del Mar (left) and Faro de San Felipe (right)
- Nickname: The Gateway to the Sea of Cortés
- Location in Mexico
- Coordinates: 31°01′39″N 114°50′07″W
- Country: Mexico
- State: Baja California
- Municipality: San Felipe
- Founded: 1916
- Elevation: 9 m (30 ft)

Population (2020)
  - Total: 17,143
- Time zone: UTC–08:00 (Zona Noroeste)
  - Summer (DST): UTC–07:00 (DST)
- Area code: +52 686
- Website: https://san-felipemexico.com/

San Felipe (Kiliwa: Juwiy mja') is a coastal city in San Felipe Municipality, Baja California, located on the Gulf of California. The population of San Felipe was reported as 17,143 inhabitants in the 2020 INEGI census. San Felipe is historically a fishing town. Today it is also a popular tourist destination, known for its beaches, nature, and desert racing, as home to the San Felipe 250.

== History ==
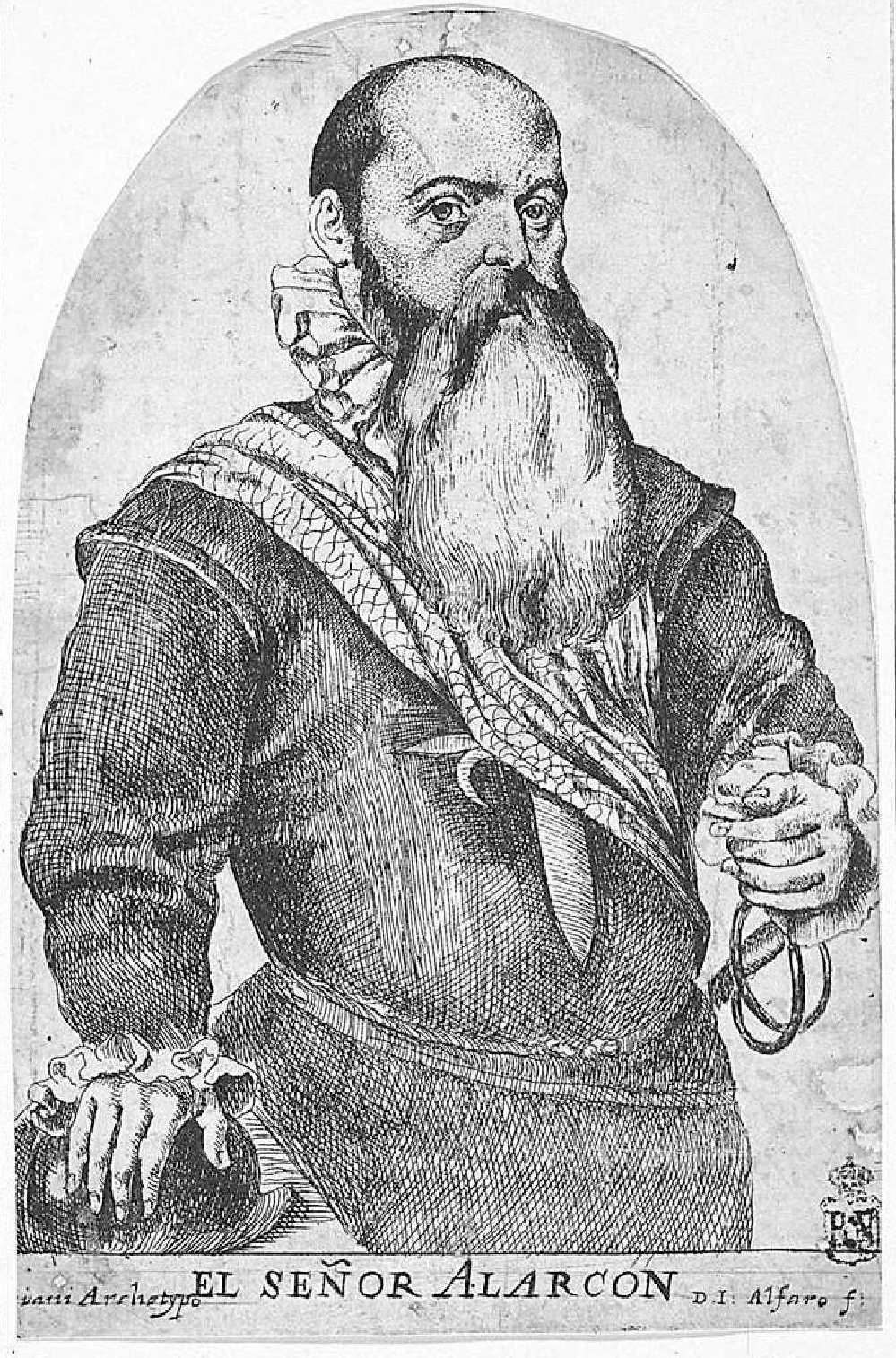
In 1536, Hernando de Alarcón gave the name "Santa Catalina" to what is today the San Felipe peninsula.

The first European to arrive in the Baja California Peninsula was Hernán Cortés on May 3, 1535. The history of San Felipe began later with the expeditions of Francisco de Ulloa, one of Cortés's captains who navigated the bay in September 1535. In 1536, Hernando de Alarcón and Domingo Castillo explored the region and made the first detailed map of the peninsula, giving San Felipe its original name, Santa Catalina.

After the first expeditions were long forgotten, Father Eusebio Kino rediscovered the Baja California peninsula in 1701. Juan de Ugarte later built the first ship in Baja California and explored the area, arriving in San Felipe on July 5, 1721. Twenty-five years later Father Ferdinand Konščak arrived and christened the bay San Felipe de Jesús. In 1766, Wenceslaus Linck was the first European person to reach San Felipe by land, and in 1794 the Lt. Governor of the Californias, José Joaquín de Arrillaga, began to use it as a port. He also established the land route between San Felipe and Ensenada through Valle de la Trinidad.

It was not until 1925, during the administration of General Abelardo L. Rodríguez, territorial governor, that San Felipe began to incorporate, when the first fishing camps were established and the government organized the first sub-delegation and school. Octavio Vega Ruiz was appointed sub-delegate and the basis for the growth and development of San Felipe were established during his administration from 1926 to 1942.

The sea transportation of both people and cargo also contributed to the integration of San Felipe as a township. Among the most celebrated ships of the era were José Ascolani's Trieste, and Pacita and Río Colorado, owned by Arnulfo Liera. By the end of the 1920s, San Felipe had nearly 100 permanent inhabitants, and in 1940 appeared for the first time in the census with 287 inhabitants.

By 1947, the Compañía Industrial del Golfo de Cortés, owned by José María Rodríguez Luján, bought the land from Guillermo Andrade's estate to build an international tourist center. The Mexicali-San Felipe highway began paving in 1948 and was completed in 1951. At the same time, the 15-room Hotel Augies (later the Villa del Mar, Trucha Vagabunda and Las Palmas Inn) opened. In 1959, the motel El Cortés was opened to the public.

Many new hotels were established in the 1960s, including Hotel Riviera, El Pescador, Arnold's del Mar and Arco Iris, and the tourist camps of Costa Azul, Las Arenas, Miramar, Playa Bonita, Playa de Laura, and Rubén's. The port had electricity by 1963 and piped drinking water by 1967. The 1970s saw the establishment of the government building, restaurants, bars, gas stations, a small boat anchorage, airport, sea walk, main boulevard and sewage system, as well as the first four-star hotel, the Playas de San Felipe, followed by the Fiesta Hotel. The La Hacienda opened in the 1980s; the Marina Resort and Spa in 1993.

Currently, San Felipe's income depends (in descending order of importance) upon tourism, shrimping and fishing.

== Geography ==
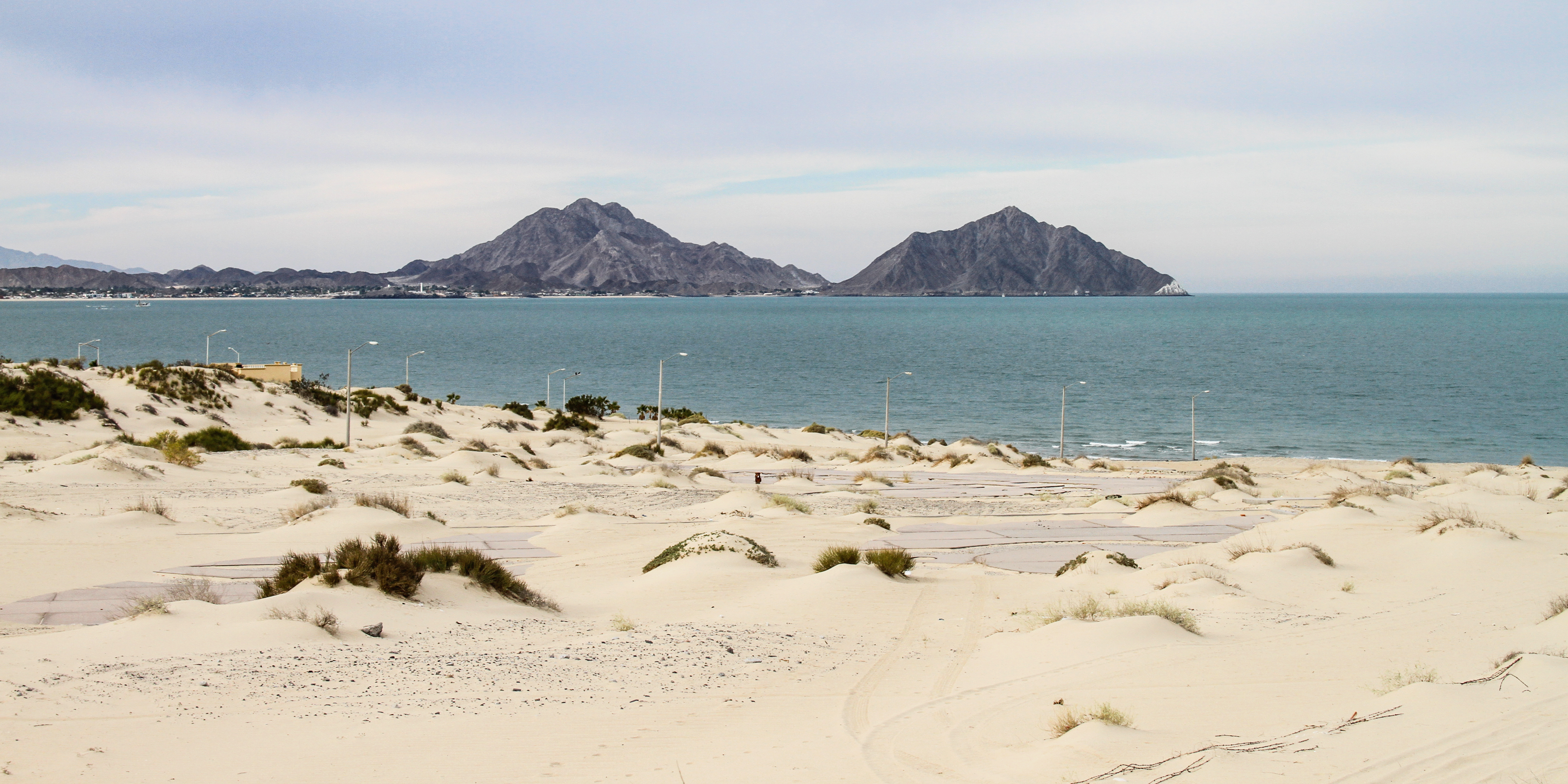
View of San Felipe from across the Bay of San Felipe, on the Gulf of California.

The Bay of San Felipe is 3 meters above sea level. At low tide, the water can recede as much as 2 km. San Felipe experiences one of the largest tidal bores in the world due in part to the Colorado River delta to the north. The seven-meter tides expose a kilometer of ocean floor.

The Valley of the Giants natural reserve of the thousand-year-old Cardon Cactus has become a major attraction after the transport of one of these giant specimens to Seville, Spain for Seville Expo '92. The area has also become a favorite spot for photographers worldwide. Local environmentalists are lobbying for the protection of the valley in the form of a Nature Reserve. The entrance to the park is located at 30.8771944°N 114.7407916°W.

=== Climate ===
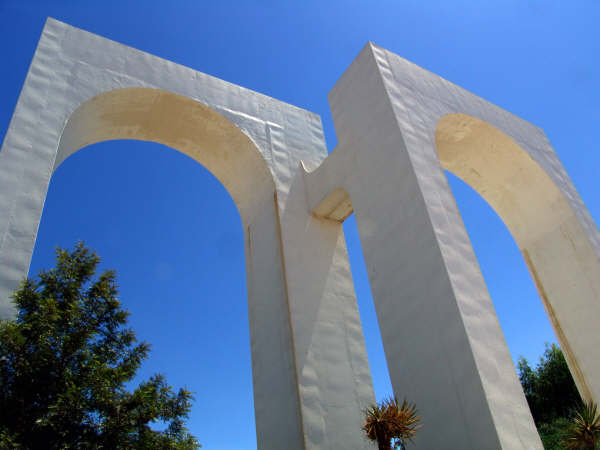
The Arcos de San Felipe.

Temperatures in San Felipe average approximately 24 °C year-round. San Felipe is located in a unique ecosystem, where the desert meets the sea. Temperatures range from a nocturnal winter low of 4 to 46 °C (39 to 115 °F) in the shade during July and August.

Climate data for San Felipe (1991–2020)
Month	Jan	Feb	Mar	Apr	May	Jun	Jul	Aug	Sep	Oct	Nov	Dec	Year
Record high °C (°F)	37.0 (98.6)	40.0 (104.0)	41.0 (105.8)	45.0 (113.0)	49.0 (120.2)	51.0 (123.8)	51.0 (123.8)	50.0 (122.0)	50.0 (122.0)	47.0 (116.6)	48.0 (118.4)	39.0 (102.2)	51.0 (123.8)
Mean daily maximum °C (°F)	21.3 (70.3)	23.4 (74.1)	26.3 (79.3)	28.7 (83.7)	31.0 (87.8)	34.4 (93.9)	36.5 (97.7)	36.9 (98.4)	35.1 (95.2)	31.0 (87.8)	26.6 (79.9)	21.6 (70.9)	29.4 (84.9)
Daily mean °C (°F)	15.6 (60.1)	17.5 (63.5)	20.5 (68.9)	22.3 (72.1)	24.8 (76.6)	28.0 (82.4)	30.6 (87.1)	30.6 (87.1)	29.0 (84.2)	24.8 (76.6)	20.6 (69.1)	16.3 (61.3)	23.4 (74.1)
Mean daily minimum °C (°F)	9.9 (49.8)	11.7 (53.1)	14.7 (58.5)	15.9 (60.6)	18.6 (65.5)	21.7 (71.1)	24.7 (76.5)	24.4 (75.9)	22.9 (73.2)	18.5 (65.3)	14.5 (58.1)	11.0 (51.8)	17.4 (63.3)
Record low °C (°F)	−1.0 (30.2)	0.0 (32.0)	0.0 (32.0)	1.0 (33.8)	5.0 (41.0)	5.0 (41.0)	5.0 (41.0)	5.0 (41.0)	3.0 (37.4)	3.0 (37.4)	−6.0 (21.2)	−2.0 (28.4)	−6.0 (21.2)
Average precipitation mm (inches)	1.4 (0.06)	5.3 (0.21)	1.6 (0.06)	0.0 (0.0)	0.0 (0.0)	1.2 (0.05)	0.5 (0.02)	2.0 (0.08)	7.0 (0.28)	8.0 (0.31)	1.1 (0.04)	2.1 (0.08)	30.2 (1.19)
Average precipitation days (≥ 0.1 mm)	0.1	0.6	0.2	0.0	0.0	0.1	0.1	0.1	0.4	0.5	0.1	0.1	2.3
Source: Servicio Meteorologico Nacional

Average Sea Temperature
Jan	Feb	Mar	Apr	May	Jun	Jul	Aug	Sep	Oct	Nov	Dec
60.5 °F 15.8 °C	60 °F 15.5 °C	63.4 °F 17.4 °C	68.1 °F 20 °C	72.9 °F 22.7 °C	78.7 °F 25.9 °C	84.6 °F 29.2 °C	87.3 °F 30.7 °C	86.5 °F 30.3 °C	80.4 °F 26.9 °C	71.8 °F 22.1 °C	63.8 °F 17.6 °C

The temperature of the sea experiences many variations, reaching a low of 60 °F in winter and highs of 79-86 °F in summer.

== Economy ==
The port of San Felipe is a small town historically dependent on fishing and now on tourism, catering mostly to travelers from the United States. The city is home to San Felipe International Airport.

=== Tourism ===
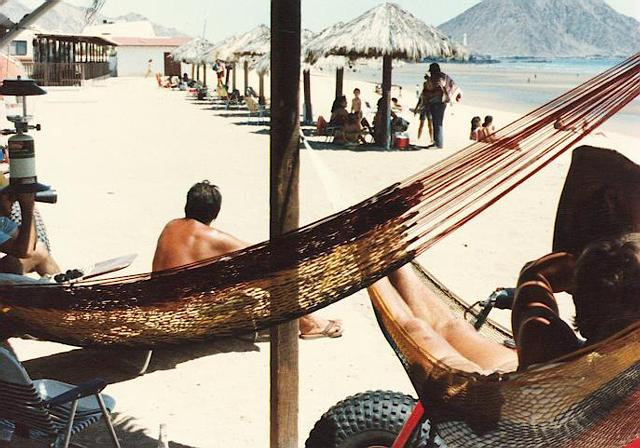
Tourists at a beach in San Felipe.

San Felipe was a popular spring break spot for residents of the Western U.S. states and northern Mexico, due to its many tourist attractions. Nightclubs and bars dot the beach areas. Some visitors enjoy camping on the beaches or off-roading on ATVs and dirt bikes in the adjacent desert.

Several hotels, ranches, camp sites and RV parks in or near the town offer volleyball, tennis, pools, bathing areas and fishing. In 2005, San Felipe's first golf course, Las Caras de Mexico, opened to the public. This oceanside golf course is located at La Ventana del Mar.

Other popular activities are desert racing events such as the Baja 250 and San Felipe 250. The former is a spin-off from the popular Baja 1000 international race organized by SCORE and hosted by CODE, an off-road racing organization based in Mexicali. The latter was organized by SCORE until 2026. Currently, CODE holds two races in the San Felipe Desert: the CODE San Felipe 200 in April and the CODE Race Ready 275 in December; the first is a loop around the deserts of San Felipe, while the other is a one-way race from Mexicali to San Felipe at the end of the season. The National Off-Road Racing Association, San Felipe Desert Mayhem, Legacy Racing Association, Record Off-Road, and Stadium Super Trucks also jointly hosted the San Felipe SpeedFest in 2027.

Another visitor attraction are the hot, sulfurous, geothermal springs at Puertecitos on the Sea of Cortez, cooled somewhat by sea water.

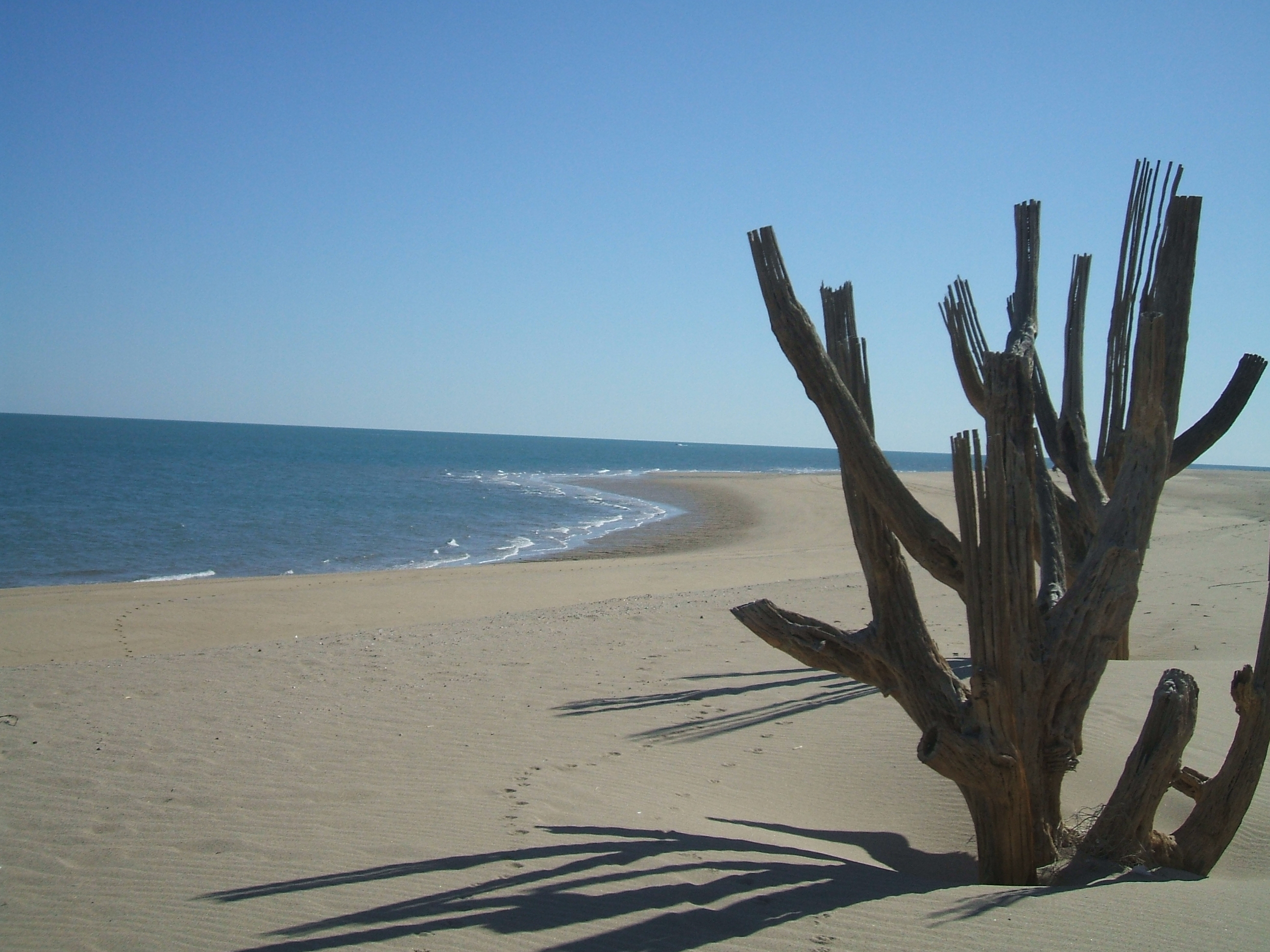
Beach in San Felipe.

In recent years, San Felipe locals and tourists have enjoyed a new activity, Carnaval. It is often referred to as a Mexican Mardi Gras but the name is an exaggeration, since the locale is smaller than in other Mexican carnivals.

The International Blues & Arts Fiesta, a San Felipe Lions Club fundraiser, is held the last Saturday in March.

Every other year, San Felipe receives hundreds of motorcycles in the Devils Run festival in the last weekend of April. Most of the riders make a run from Temecula, California, but the event attracts bikers from many different places as far as Cancun, Mexico or New York The three day event includes several contest and get together experiences like a rock concert sponsored by the local authorities and gets up to 90% of the different lodgings available in town.

One of the lesser known sightseeing trips in San Felipe is a boat ride to Konsag Island. This is a rock visible from the San Felipe coast line and about an hour out to sea. The area around the rock has plenty of marine life and great fishing.
