= Isla Salsipuedes =

Island in Mexico

- Location within Mexico

Geography
- Location: Gulf of California
- Coordinates: 28°43′37.57″N 112°57′21.64″W
- Highest elevation: 50 m (160 ft)

Administration
- Mexico
- State: Baja California

Demographics
- Population: uninhabited

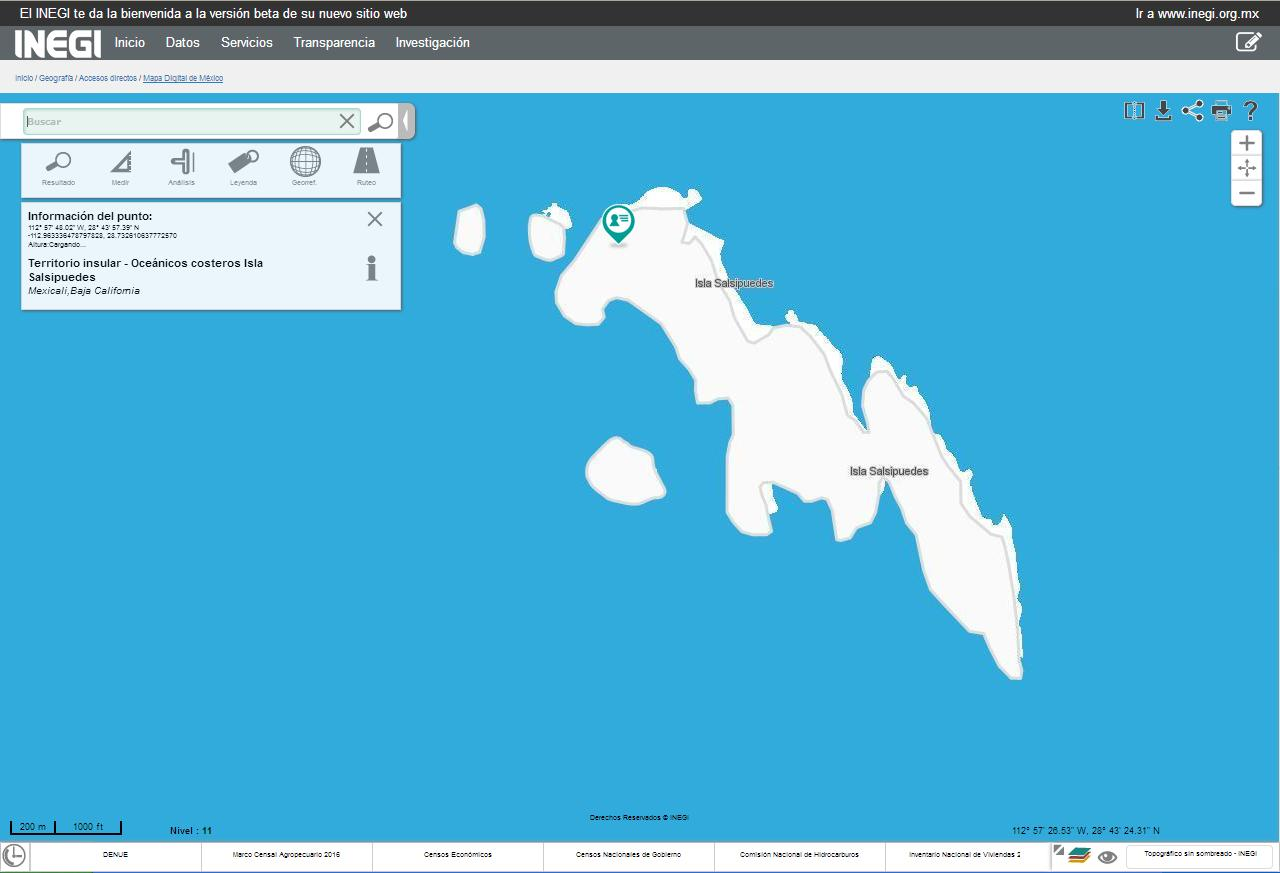
Map of the isles

Isla Salsipuedes is an island in the Gulf of California off the coast of the Baja California Peninsula. The island is uninhabited and is part of the Mexicali Municipality. The name of the island is a contraction of the Spanish "sal si puedes", or "leave if you can".

== Biology ==
Isla Salsipuedes has six species of reptiles: Aspidoscelis cana (Isla Salsipuedes whiptail), Crotalus mitchellii (speckled rattlesnake), Hypsiglena ochrorhyncha (coast night snake), Lampropeltis californiae (California kingsnake), Phyllodactylus nocticolus (peninsular leaf-toed gecko), and Uta antiqua (San Lorenzo Islands side-blotched lizard).
