= Swollen-nosed side-blotched lizard =

Conservation status
- Vulnerable (IUCN 3.1)

Scientific classification
- Kingdom: Animalia
- Phylum: Chordata
- Class: Reptilia
- Order: Squamata
- Suborder: Iguania
- Family: Phrynosomatidae
- Genus: Uta
- Species: U. tumidarostra

Binomial name
- Uta tumidarostra Grismer, 1994

Species of lizard

The swollen-nosed side-blotched lizard (Uta tumidarostra) is a species of lizard. Its range is in Mexico.

Its diet consist of mainly sea food but has developed a way of sneezing out excess salt.
