= Enchanted side-blotched lizard =

Conservation status
- Vulnerable (IUCN 3.1)

Scientific classification
- Kingdom: Animalia
- Phylum: Chordata
- Class: Reptilia
- Order: Squamata
- Suborder: Iguania
- Family: Phrynosomatidae
- Genus: Uta
- Species: U. encantadae

Binomial name
- Uta encantadae Grismer, 1994

Species of lizard

The enchanted side-blotched lizard or San Lorenzo Island lizard (Uta encantadae) is a species of lizard. Its range is in Mexico.
