= Proseč (disambiguation) =

Proseč is a town in the Pardubice Region of the Czech Republic.

Prosec or Proseč may also refer to:

== Economy ==
- Prosec Mexico, an economic program

== Places in the Czech Republic ==
- Proseč (Pelhřimov District), a municipality and village in the Vysočina Region
- Proseč, a village and part of Kámen (Havlíčkův Brod District) in the Vysočina Region
- Proseč, a village and part of Pošná in the Vysočina Region
- Proseč, a village and part of Seč (Chrudim District) in the Pardubice Region
- Proseč, a village and part of Záhoří (Semily District) in the Liberec Region
- Proseč, a village and part of Žernov (Semily District) in the Liberec Region
- Proseč pod Ještědem, a municipality and village in the Liberec Region
- Proseč pod Křemešníkem, a municipality and village in the Vysočina Region
