= Baja California =

State of Mexico

- State
- Free and Sovereign State of Baja California; Estado Libre y Soberano de Baja California (Spanish)
- Flag Coat of arms
- Anthem: "Canto a Baja California"
- State of Baja California within Mexico
- Coordinates: 30°00′N 115°10′W
- Country: Mexico
- Capital: Mexicali
- Largest city: Tijuana
- Largest metro: Greater Tijuana
- Municipalities: 7
- Before statehood: Territory of Baja California Norte
- Admission: 16 January 1952
- Order: 29th

Government
  - Governor: Marina del Pilar Ávila Olmeda (Morena)
  - Legislature: Congress of Baja California
  - Senators: Jaime Bonilla Valdez (Morena); Alejandra León Gastélum (Morena); Gina Cruz Blackledge (PAN)
  - Deputies: Federal deputies: • Yesenia Olúa González (1st); •Julieta Andrea Ramírez Padilla (2nd); •Armando Reyes Ledesma (3rd); •Socorro Irma Andazola Gómez (4th); •Evangelina Moreno Guerra (5th); •Héctor Mares Cossío (6th); •Isaías Bertín Sandoval (7th); •Fausto Gallardo García (8th)

Area
  - Total: 71,450 km^{2} (27,590 sq mi)
  - Rank: 12th

Population (2020)
  - Total: 3,769,020
  - Rank: 14th
  - Density: 52.75/km^{2} (136.6/sq mi)
  - Rank: 19th
- Demonym: Bajacaliforniano(a)

GDP
  - Total: MXN 1.082 trillion (US$53.9 billion) (2022)
  - Per capita: US$14,185 (2022)
- Time zone: UTC–08:00 (Zona Noroeste)
  - Summer (DST): UTC–07:00 (DST^{[a]})
- Postal code: 21, 22
- Area code: Area codes: • 615; • 616; • 646; • 653; • 658; • 661; • 664; • 665; • 686
- ISO 3166 code: MX-BCN
- HDI: ▲0.830 very high Ranked 5th of 32
- Website: Official website
- a. 2010 and later. Baja California is the only state to use the U.S. DST schedule state-wide, while the rest of Mexico (except for small portions of other northern states) observes standard time year-round. b. The state's GDP was 294.8 billion pesos in 2008, an amount corresponding to 23.03 billion United States dollars, with US$1 valued at 12.80 pesos (value of 3 June 2010).

Baja California, (Note: This state is often informally referred to as Baja California Norte (literally "Lower California North" or "North Lower California" in English) or Baja Norte, to distinguish it from both the Baja California peninsula as a whole, of which it forms the northern half, and Baja California Sur, the adjacent state that covers the southern half of the peninsula. While Baja Norte and Baja California Norte are well-established terms for the northern half of the Baja California peninsula, they do not officially exist as political designations for any state or region. The latter name (Baja California Norte) was officially adopted from 1974 to 1979, and endured unofficially thereafter. In other words, "The northern state is officially known as Baja California, but since that name is easily confused with the name for the entire peninsula, it is commonly referred to by visitors and locals alike as Baja Norte.") (Note: Spanish pronunciation: [ˈbaxa kaliˈfoɾnja]; 'Lower California') officially the Free and Sovereign State of Baja California, (Note: Spanish: Estado Libre y Soberano de Baja California) is a state in Mexico. It is the northwesternmost of the 32 federal entities of Mexico. Before becoming a state in 1952, the area was known as the North Territory of Baja California (Territorio Norte de Baja California). It has an area of 70,113 square kilometers (27,071 sq mi) (3.57% of the land mass of Mexico) and comprises the northern half of the Baja California peninsula, north of the 28th parallel, plus oceanic Guadalupe Island. The mainland portion of the state is bordered on the west by the Pacific Ocean, on the east by Sonora and the northern Gulf of California, on the south by Baja California Sur, and by the north is the United States with the US States of California to the north and Arizona slightly to the east.

The state has an estimated population of 3,769,020 as of 2020, significantly higher than the sparsely populated Baja California Sur to the south, and similar to San Diego County, California, to its north. Over 75% of the population lives in Mexicali (the state's capital city), Ensenada, or Tijuana (the state's largest city). Other important cities include San Felipe, Rosarito, and Tecate.

Baja California is the 12th-largest state by area in Mexico. Its geography ranges from beaches to forests and deserts. The backbone of the state is the Sierra de Baja California, where Picacho del Diablo, the highest point of the peninsula, is located. This mountain range effectively divides the weather patterns in the state. In the northwest, the weather is semi-dry and Mediterranean. In the narrow center, the weather changes to be more humid due to altitude. It is in this area where a few valleys can be found, such as the Valle de Guadalupe, the major wine-producing area in Mexico. To the east of the mountain range, the Sonoran Desert dominates the landscape. In the south, the weather becomes drier and gives way to the Vizcaíno Desert. The state is also home to numerous islands off both of its shores. Baja California is also home to Guadalupe Island, the westernmost point of Mexico, as well as its northernmost point. The Coronado Islands, Todos Santos islands, and Cedros Island are also on the Pacific shore. On the Gulf of California, the largest island is Angel de la Guarda Island, separated from the peninsula by the deep and narrow Canal de Ballenas.

== History ==
=== Prehistory and Spanish colonial era ===
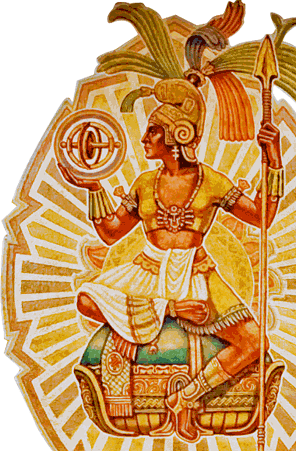
The word "California" and its namesake ruler, Queen Calafia, originate in the 1510 epic Las Sergas de Esplandián, written by Garci Rodríguez de Montalvo.

The first people came to the peninsula at least 11,000 years ago. At that time, two main native groups are thought to have been present on the peninsula – the Cochimí in the south, and several groups belonging to the Yuman language family in the north, including the Kiliwa, Paipai, Kumeyaay, Cocopa, and Quechan. These peoples were diverse in their adaptations to the region. The Cochimí of the peninsula's Central Desert were generalized hunter-gatherers who moved frequently; however, the Cochimí on Cedros Island off the west coast developed a strong maritime economy. The Kiliwa, Paipai, and Kumeyaay in the better-watered northwest were also hunter-gatherers, but that region supported denser populations and a more sedentary lifestyle. The Cocopa and Quechan of northeastern Baja California practiced agriculture in the floodplain of the lower Colorado River.

Another group of people was the Guachimis, who came from the north and created much of the UNESCO World Heritage-recognized Sierra de Guadalupe cave paintings. Not much is known about them except that they lived in the area between 100 BC and 1300 AD.

Europeans reached the present state of Baja California in 1539, when Francisco de Ulloa reconnoitered its east coast on the Gulf of California and explored the peninsula's west coast at least as far north as Cedros Island. Hernando de Alarcón returned to the east coast and ascended the lower Colorado River in 1540, and Juan Rodríguez Cabrillo (or João Rodrigues Cabrilho (in Portuguese)) completed the reconnaissance of the west coast in 1542. Sebastián Vizcaíno again surveyed the west coast in 1602, but outside visitors during the following century were few.

The Jesuits founded a permanent mission colony on the peninsula at Loreto in 1697. During the following decades, they gradually extended their sway throughout the present state of Baja California Sur. In 1751–1753, the Croatian Jesuit mission-explorer Ferdinand Konščak made overland explorations northward into the state of Baja California. Jesuit missions were subsequently established among the Cochimí at Santa Gertrudis (1752), San Borja (1762), and Santa María (1767).

After the expulsion of the Jesuits in 1768, the short-lived Franciscan administration (1768–1773) resulted in one new mission at San Fernando Velicatá. More importantly, the 1769 expedition to settle Alta California under Gaspar de Portolà and Junípero Serra resulted in the first overland exploration of the northwestern portion of the state.

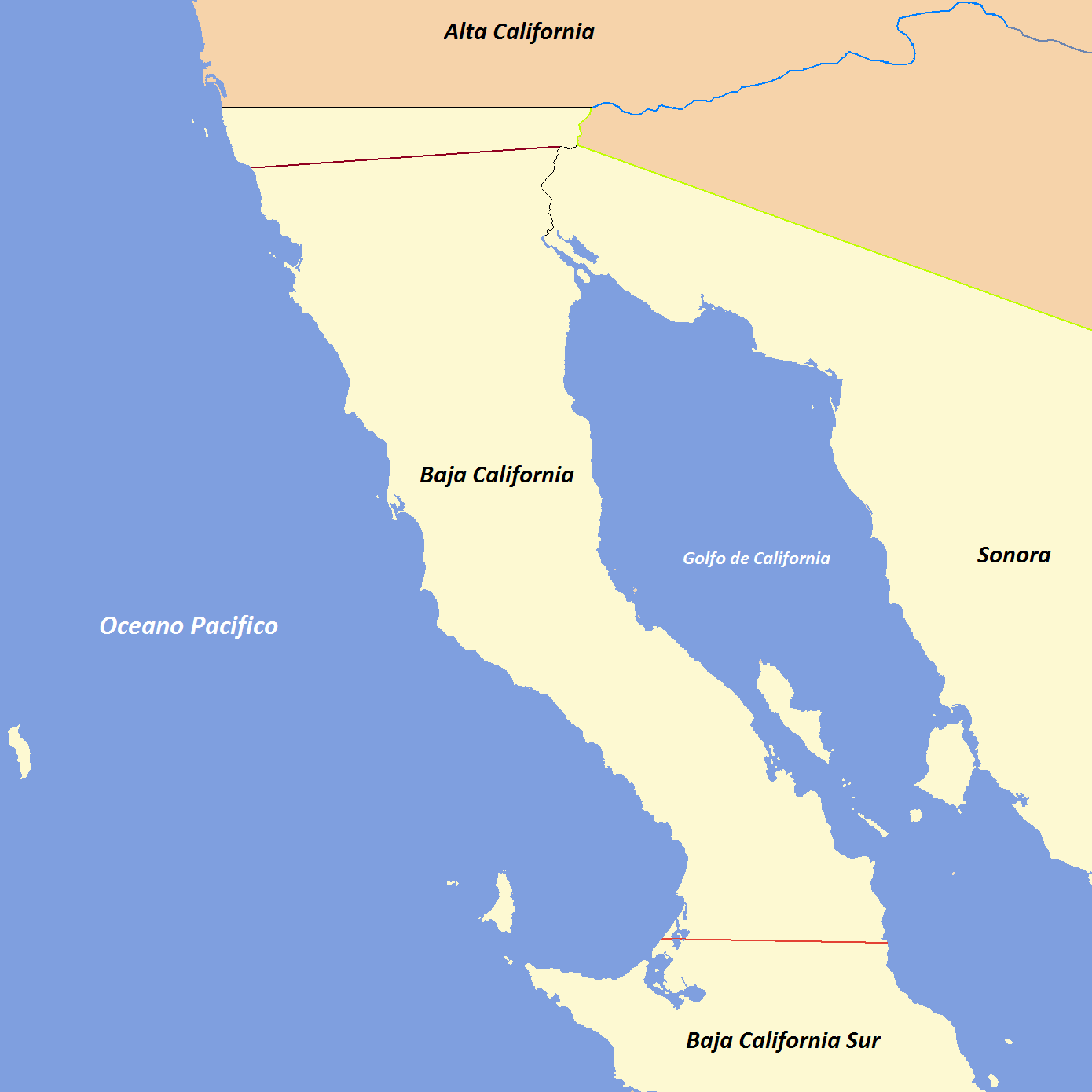
Evolution of the political boundaries of the Californias: Palóu Line (1804–1836) Gila River; border between Las Californias/Alta California and Sonora (1767–1847) Treaty of Guadalupe Hidalgo (1848–present) Baja California Sur boundary (1931–present)

The Dominicans took over management of the Baja California missions from the Franciscans in 1773. They established a chain of new missions among the northern Cochimí and western Yumans, first on the coast and subsequently inland, extending from El Rosario (1774) to Descanso (1817), just south of Tijuana below the Palóu Line.

In 1804, the Spanish crown divided California into Alta ('Upper') and Baja ('Lower') California at the line separating the Franciscan missions in the north from the Dominican missions in the south. The colonial governors were José Joaquín de Arillaga (1804–1805), Felipe de Goicoechea (1806–1814), and José Darío Argüello (1814 – April 11, 1822).

=== Post-independence, 1821–present ===
==== Early republic ====
Mexican liberals were concerned that the Roman Catholic Church retained too much power in the post-independence period and sought to undermine it by mandating the secularization of missions in 1833. In the aftermath of the Mexican American War (1846–1848) and the Treaty of Guadalupe Hidalgo, the United States gained sovereignty over territory previously held first by New Spain and then Mexico, most of which was sparsely settled. Alta California was incorporated into the U.S., and during the California Gold Rush, quickly gained enough population to be admitted to the union as a state. Baja California gains control of where is now the cities of Tijuana, Mexicali, and Tecate from Alta California after the treaty and remained under Mexican control. In 1853, soldier of fortune (mercenary) William Walker captured La Paz, declaring himself president of the Republic of Baja California. The Mexican government forced his retreat after several months.

==== Era of Porfirio Díaz ====
When liberal army general Porfirio Díaz came to power in 1876, he embarked on a major program to develop and modernize Mexico.

- 1884: Luis Huller and George H. Sisson obtain a concession covering much of the present state in return for promises to develop the area.
- 1905: The Magonista revolution, an anarchist movement based on the writings of Ricardo Flores Magón and Enrique Flores Magón, begins.
- 1911: Mexicali and Tijuana are captured by the Mexican Liberal Party (Partido Liberal Mexicano, PLM), but soon surrender to Federal forces.

==== Postrevolutionary Mexico ====
- 1917: On 11 December, "[a] prominent Mexican, close friend of President Carranza" offered to U.S. Senator Henry Ashurst to sell Baja California to the U.S. for "fifty million dollars gold".
- 1931: Baja California is further divided into Northern and Southern territories.
- 1952: The North Territory of Baja California becomes the 29th state of Mexico, Baja California. The southern portion (below 28°N) remains a federally administered territory.
- 1974: The South Territory of Baja California becomes the 31st state, Baja California Sur.
- 1989: Ernesto Ruffo Appel of the National Action Party (PAN) becomes the first non-Institutional Revolutionary Party governor of Baja California and the first opposition governor of any state since the Revolution. Baja California would acquire a reputation as a stronghold for PAN into the 2010s.

== Geography ==
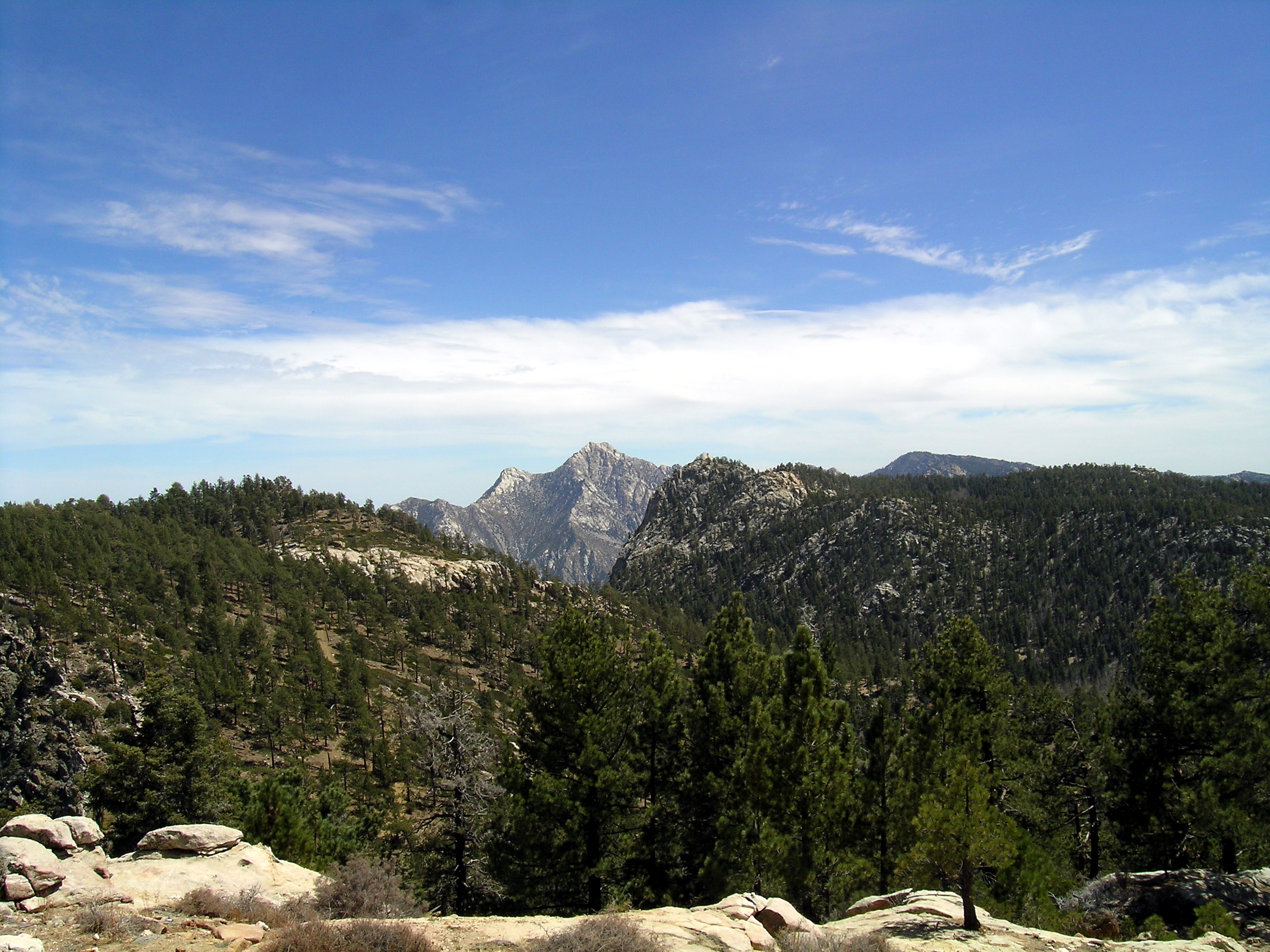
Sierra de San Pedro Mártir, with Picacho del Diablo in the center

Baja California encompasses a territory within the Californias region of North America, which exhibits diverse geography for a relatively small area. The Peninsular Ranges of the California cordillera run down the geographic center of the state. The most notable ranges of these mountains are the Sierra de Juárez and the Sierra de San Pedro Mártir. These ranges are the location of forests reminiscent of Southern California's San Gabriel Mountains. Picacho del Diablo is the highest peak on the peninsula. Valleys between the mountain ranges are located within a climate zone that is suitable for agriculture. Such valleys include the Valle de Guadalupe and the Valle de Ojos Negros, areas that produce citrus fruits and grapes. The mineral-rich mountain range extends southwards to the Gulf of California, where the western slope becomes wider, forming the Llanos del Berrendo on the border with Baja California Sur. The mountain ranges located in the center and southern part of the state include the Sierra de La Asamblea, Sierra de Calamajué, Sierra de San Luis and the Sierra de San Borja.

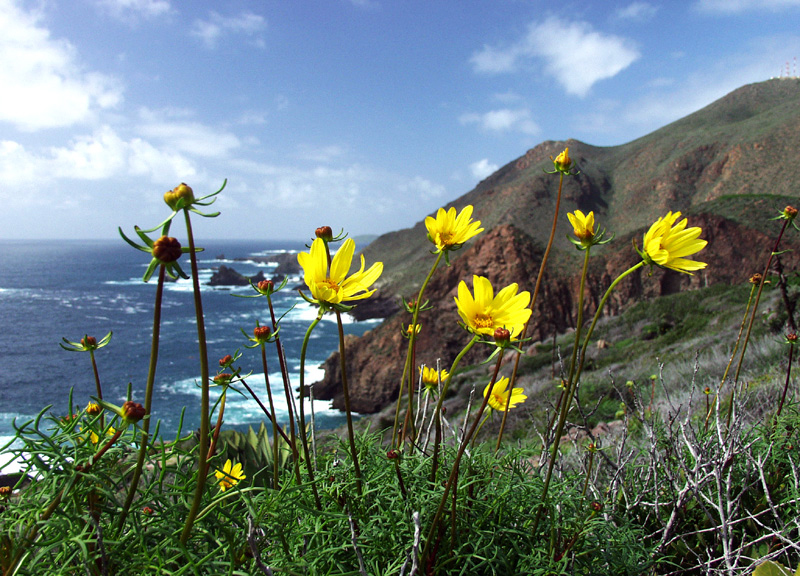
Leptosyne maritima growing on the Ensenada Municipality coast, typical of the California coastal sage and chaparral ecoregion

Temperate winds from the Pacific Ocean and the cold California Current make the climate along the northwestern coast pleasant year-round. As a result of the state's location on the California Current, rains from the north barely reach the peninsula, thus leaving southern areas drier. South of the El Rosario River, the state changes from a Mediterranean landscape to a desert one. This desert exhibits diverse succulent species that flourish in part due to the coastal fog.

To the east, the Sonoran Desert enters the state from both California and Sonora. Some of the highest temperatures in Mexico are recorded in or nearby the Mexicali Valley. (Note: Delta in the northeast recorded 54.0 °C (129.2 °F) on 3 August 1998.) However, with irrigation from the Colorado River, this area has become a true agricultural center. The Cerro Prieto geothermal province is near Mexicali as well (this area is geologically part of a large pull apart basin); it produces about 80% of the electricity consumed in the state and enough additional power to export to California. Laguna Salada, a saline lake below sea level lying between the rugged Sierra de Juárez and the Sierra de los Cucapah, is also in the vicinity of Mexicali. The state government has recently been considering plans to revive Laguna Salada. (Note: The state is currently (2008) looking at a plan by SDSU Adj. Professor Newcomb (ICATS) to do this using his geothermal desalination system to supply water locally. SEMARNAT believes this to be the first viable plan presented.) The highest mountain in the Sierra de los Cucapah is Cerro del Centinela or Mount Signal. The Cucapah are the primary indigenous people from the mountains north to Yuma, Arizona.

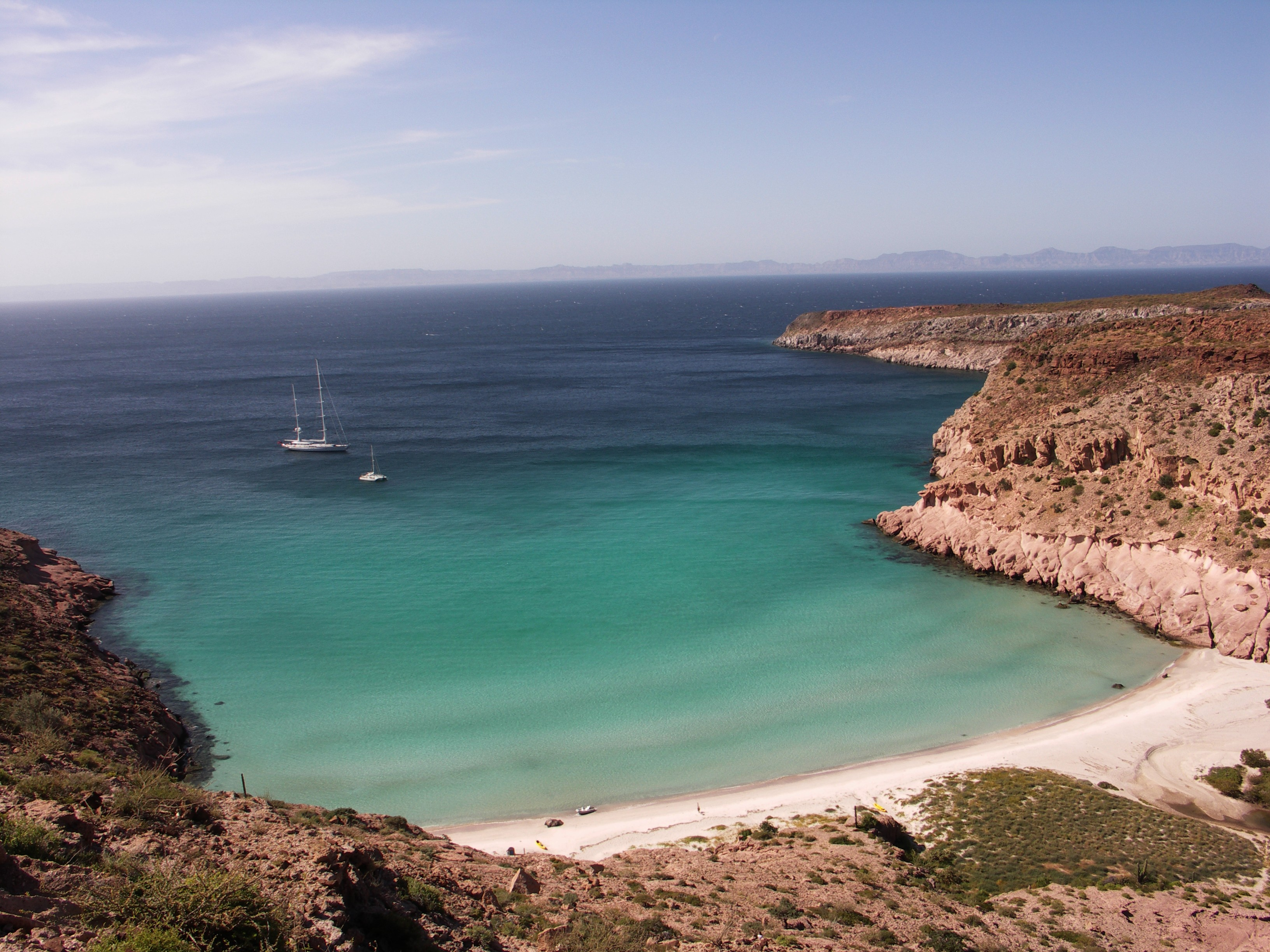
Isla Partida, part of the San Lorenzo Marine Archipelago National Park

There are numerous islands on the Pacific shore. Guadalupe Island is located in the extreme west of the state's boundaries and is the site of large colonies of sea lions. Cedros Island exists in the southwest of the state's maritime region. The Todos Santos islands and Coronado Islands are located off the coasts of Ensenada and Tijuana, respectively. All of the islands in the Gulf of California on the Baja California side belong to the municipality of Mexicali.

Baja California obtains much of its water from the Colorado River. Historically, the river drained into the Colorado River Delta and then flowed into the Gulf of California, but due to large demands for water in the American Southwest, less water now reaches the Gulf. The Tijuana metropolitan area also relies on the Tijuana River as a source of water. Much of rural Baja California depends predominantly on wells, a few dams and even oases. Tijuana also purchases water from San Diego County's Otay Water District. Potable water is the largest natural resource issue of the state.

=== Climate ===
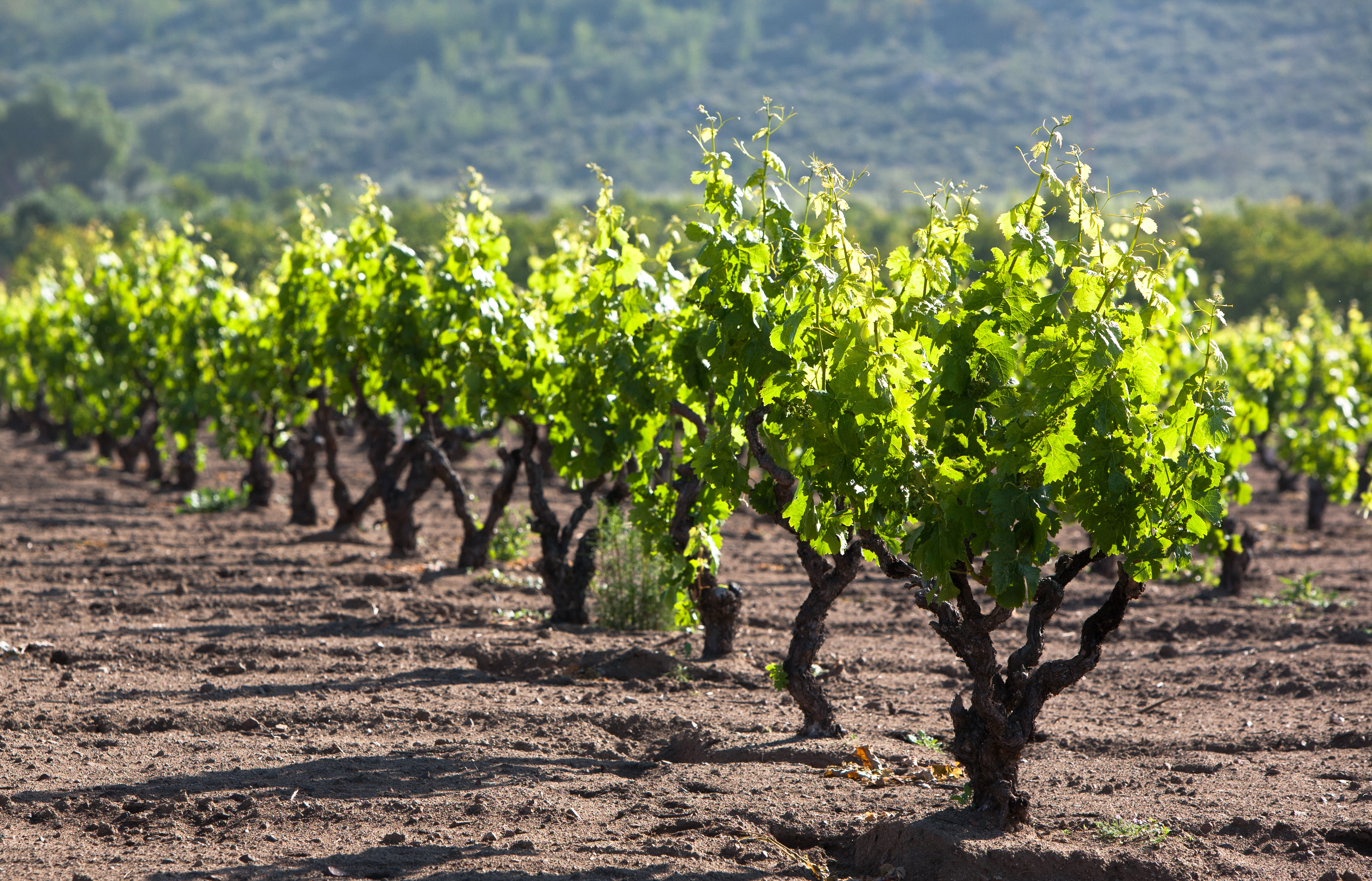
Vineyard in the Valle de Guadalupe

Baja California's climate varies from Mediterranean to arid. The Mediterranean climate is found in the northwestern corner of the state, where the summers are dry and mild and the winters cool and rainy. This climate is observed in areas from Tijuana to San Quintín and nearby interior valleys. The cold oceanic California Current often creates a low-level marine fog near the coast. The fog occurs along any part of the Pacific coast of the state.

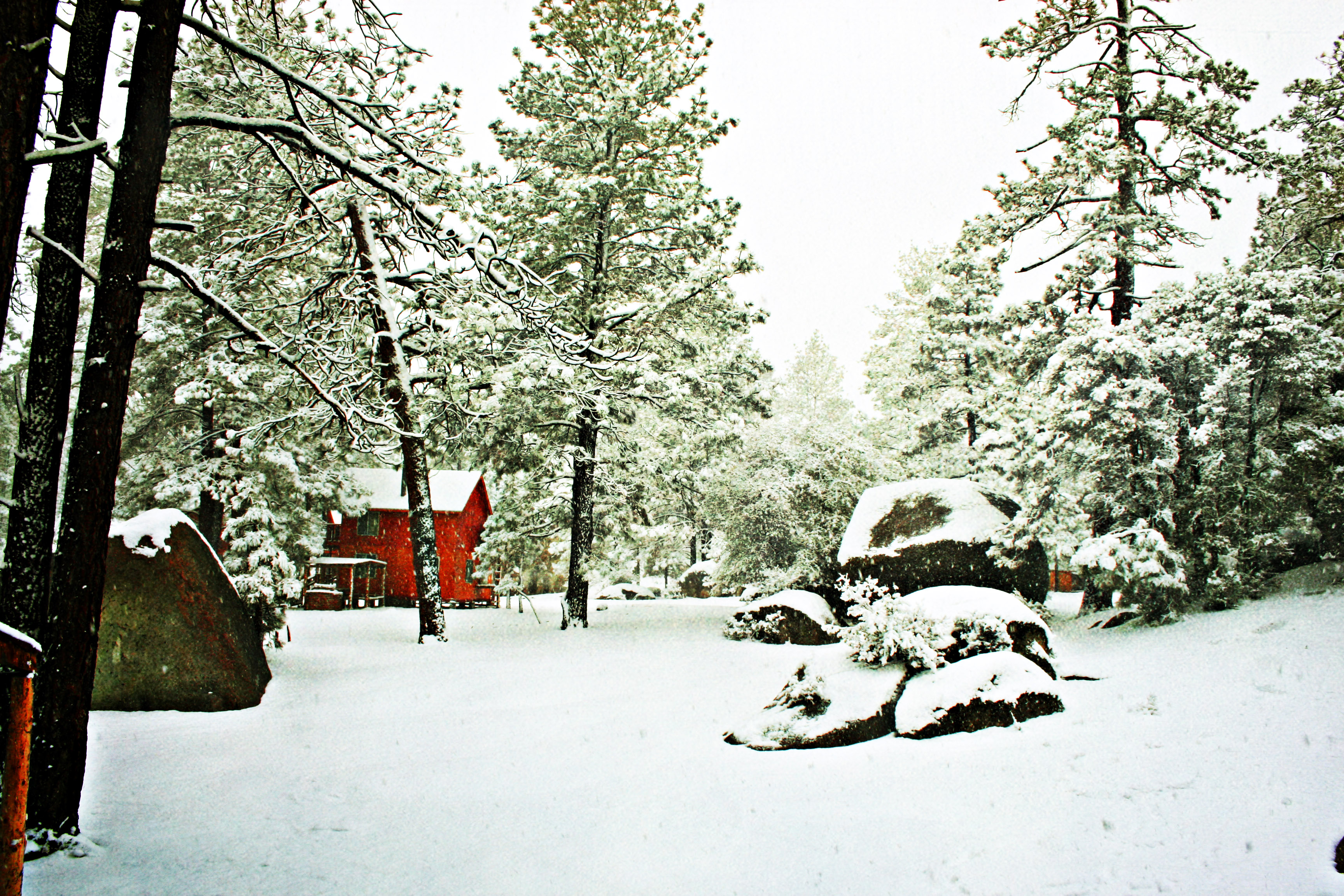
Snowfall at Constitution 1857 National Park

The change of altitude towards the Sierra de Baja California creates an alpine climate in this region. Summers are cool, while winters can be cold with below freezing temperatures at night. It is common to see snow in the Sierra de Juárez, Sierra de San Pedro Mártir and in the valleys in between the two ranges from December to April. Due to orographic effects, precipitation is much higher in the mountains of northern Baja California than on the western coastal plain or eastern desert plain. Pine, cedar and fir forests are found in the mountains.

The mountains produce a rain shadow to the east of their peaks, creating an extremely arid environment. The Sonoran Desert region of Baja California experiences hot summers and nearly frostless mild winters. The Mexicali Valley (which is below sea level) experiences the highest temperatures in Mexico, frequently surpassing 47 °C (116.6 °F) in mid-summer, and exceeding 50 °C (122 °F) on some occasions.

Further south along the Pacific coast, the Mediterranean climate transitions into a desert climate, but it is milder and not as hot as along the gulf coast. Transition climates, from Mediterranean to desert, can be found from San Quintín to El Rosario. Further inland and along the Gulf of California, the vegetation is scarce and temperatures are very high during the summer months. The islands in the Gulf of California also have a desert climate. Some oases can be found in the desert where few towns are located – for instance, Catavina, San Borja and Santa Gertrudis.

=== Flora and fauna ===
Common trees at the higher elevations are the Jeffrey pine, sugar pine and pinon pine. Understory species include manzanita. There is a variety of reptiles, including the western fence lizard, which is at the southern extent of its range. The name of the fish genus Bajacalifornia is derived from the Baja California peninsula.

In the main wildlife refuges on the peninsula of Baja California, Constitution 1857 National Park and Sierra de San Pedro Mártir National Park, several coniferous species can be found. The most abundant are Jeffrey pine, Pinus ponderosa, Pinus cembroides, Pinus quadrifolia, Pinus monophylla, Juniperus, Arctostaphylos pringlei subsp. drupacea, Artemisia ludoviciana and Adenostoma sparsifolium. Baja California shares many plant species with the Laguna Mountains and San Jacinto Mountains in southwest California. The lower elevations of the Sierra de Juárez are characterized by chaparral and desert shrub. Guadalupe Island and its surrounding waters, 250 kilometres (160 miles) off the Pacific coast, has been designated the Guadalupe Island Biosphere Reserve to preserve endangered marine and terrestrial species of animals and plants.

The fauna in the parks include a large number of mammals, primarily mule deer, bighorn sheep, cougars, bobcats, ringtail cats, coyotes, rabbits, squirrels and more than 30 species of bats. The park is also home to many avian species like bald eagles, golden eagles, falcons, woodpeckers, black vultures, crows, and several species of Sittidae and duck.

Flora and fauna of Baja California

Sea otter

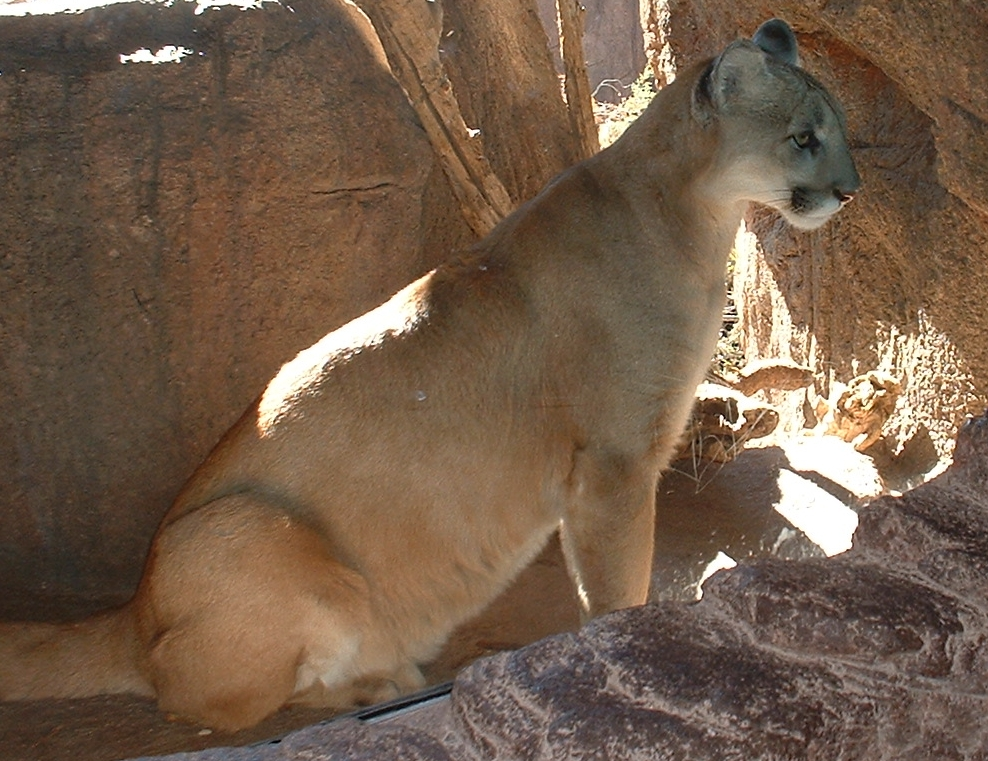
Cougar

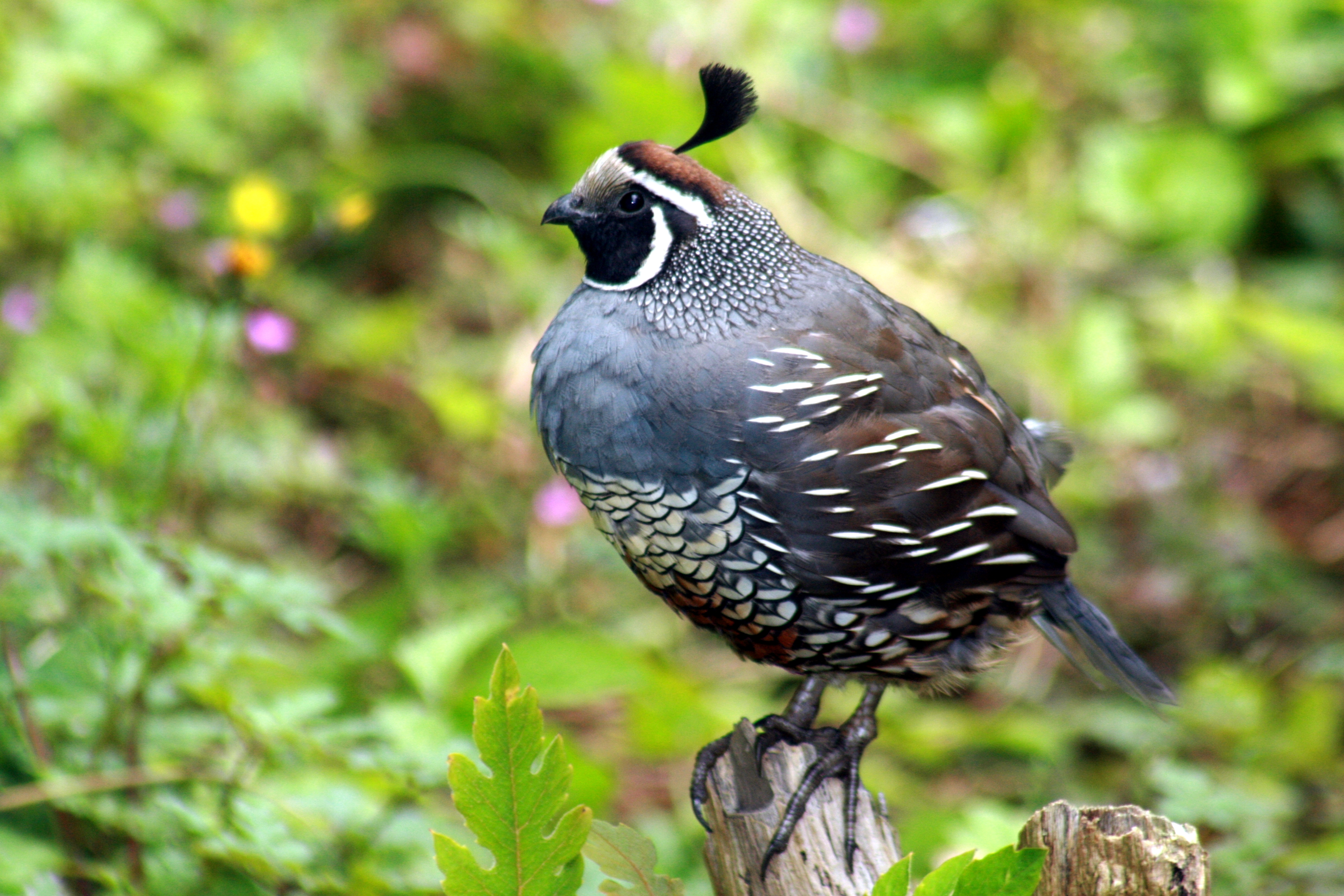
California quail

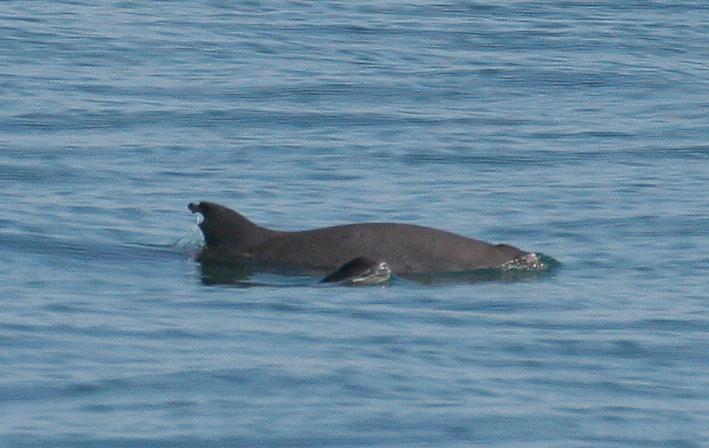
Vaquita

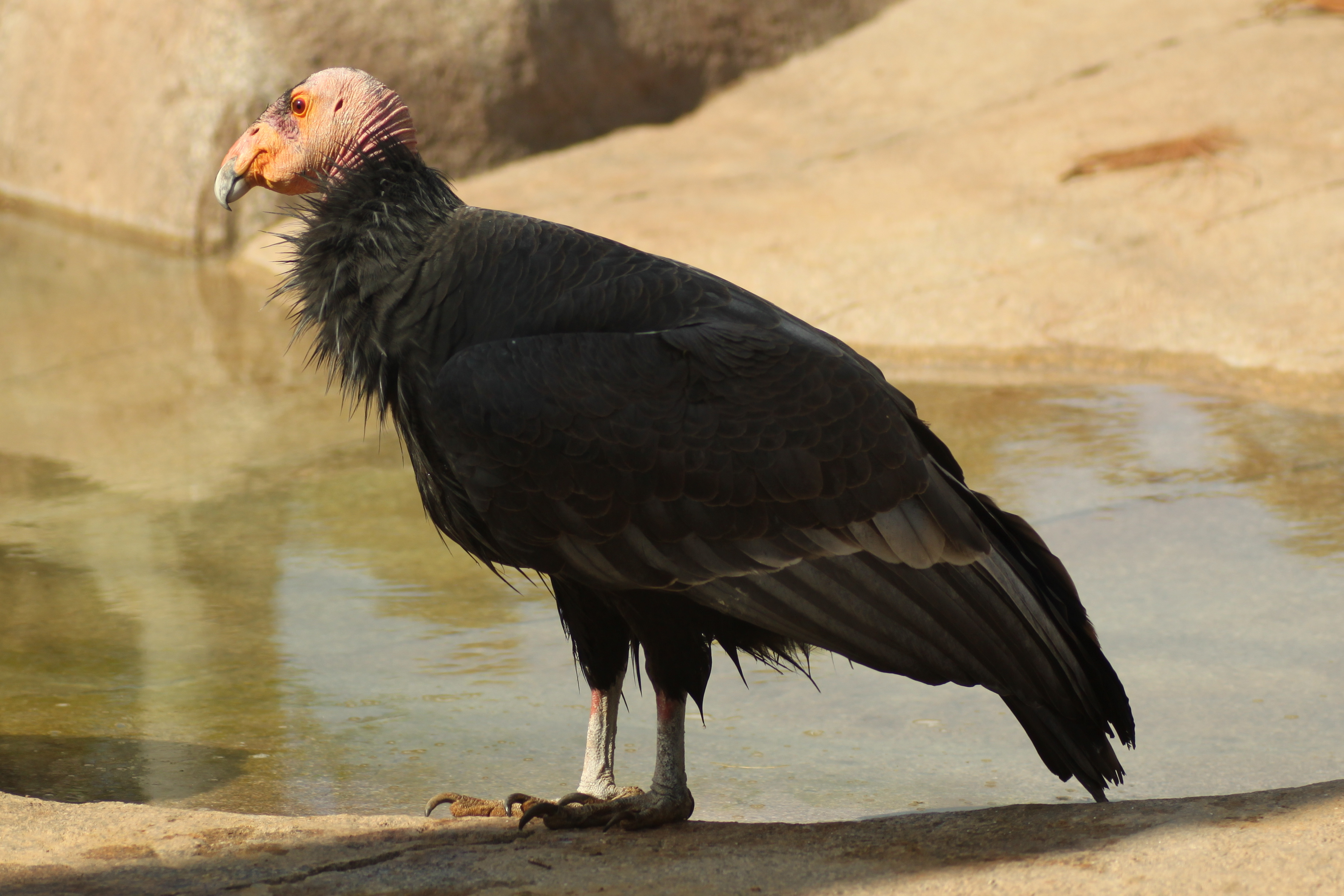
California condor

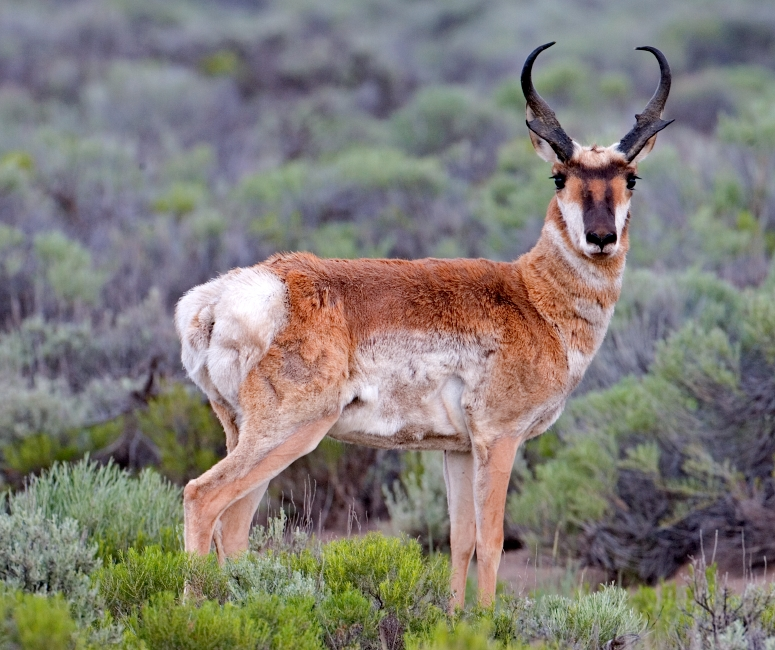
Pronghorn

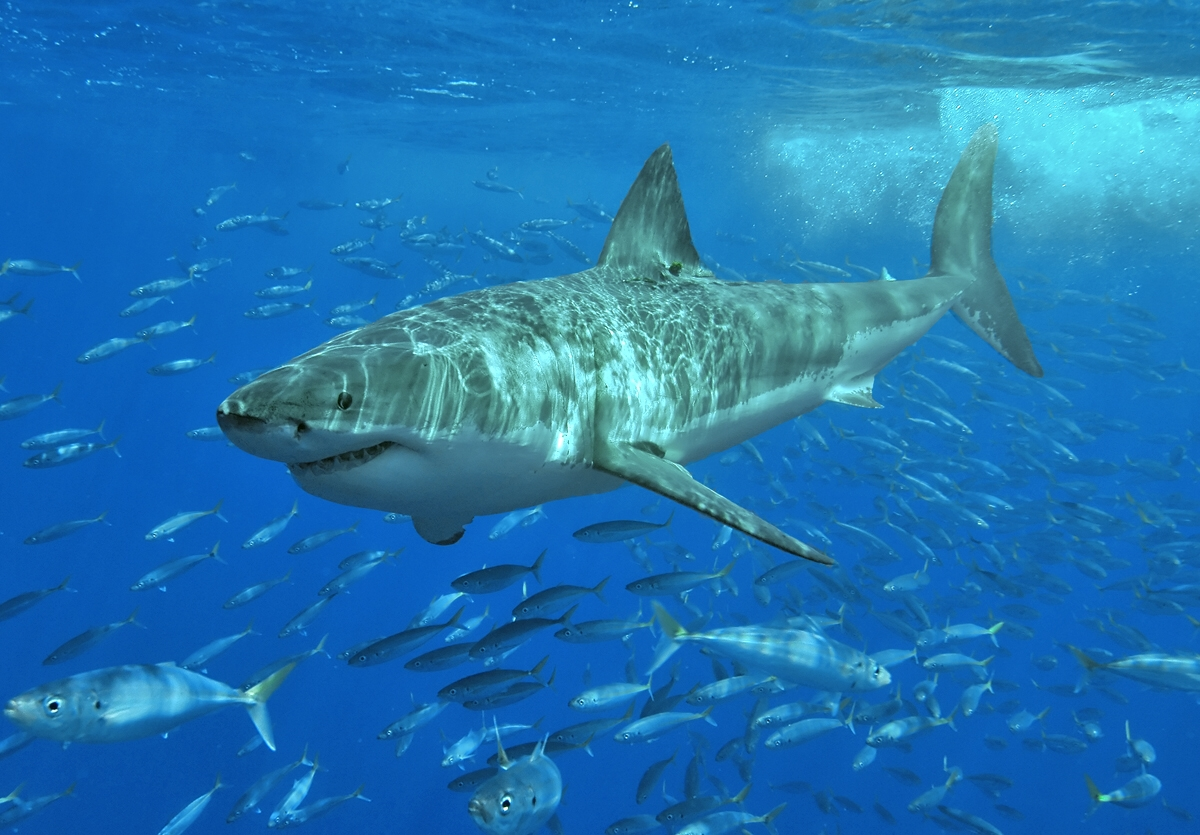
Great white shark

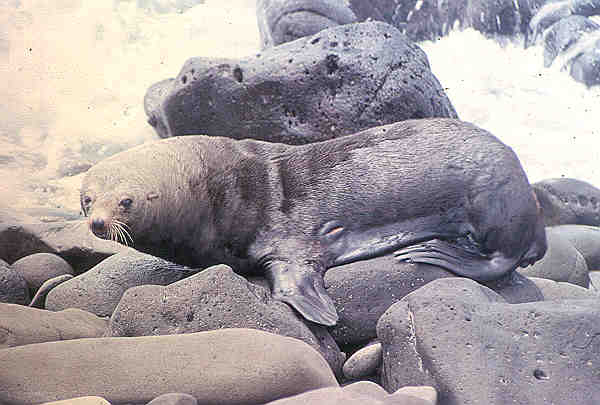
Guadalupe fur seal

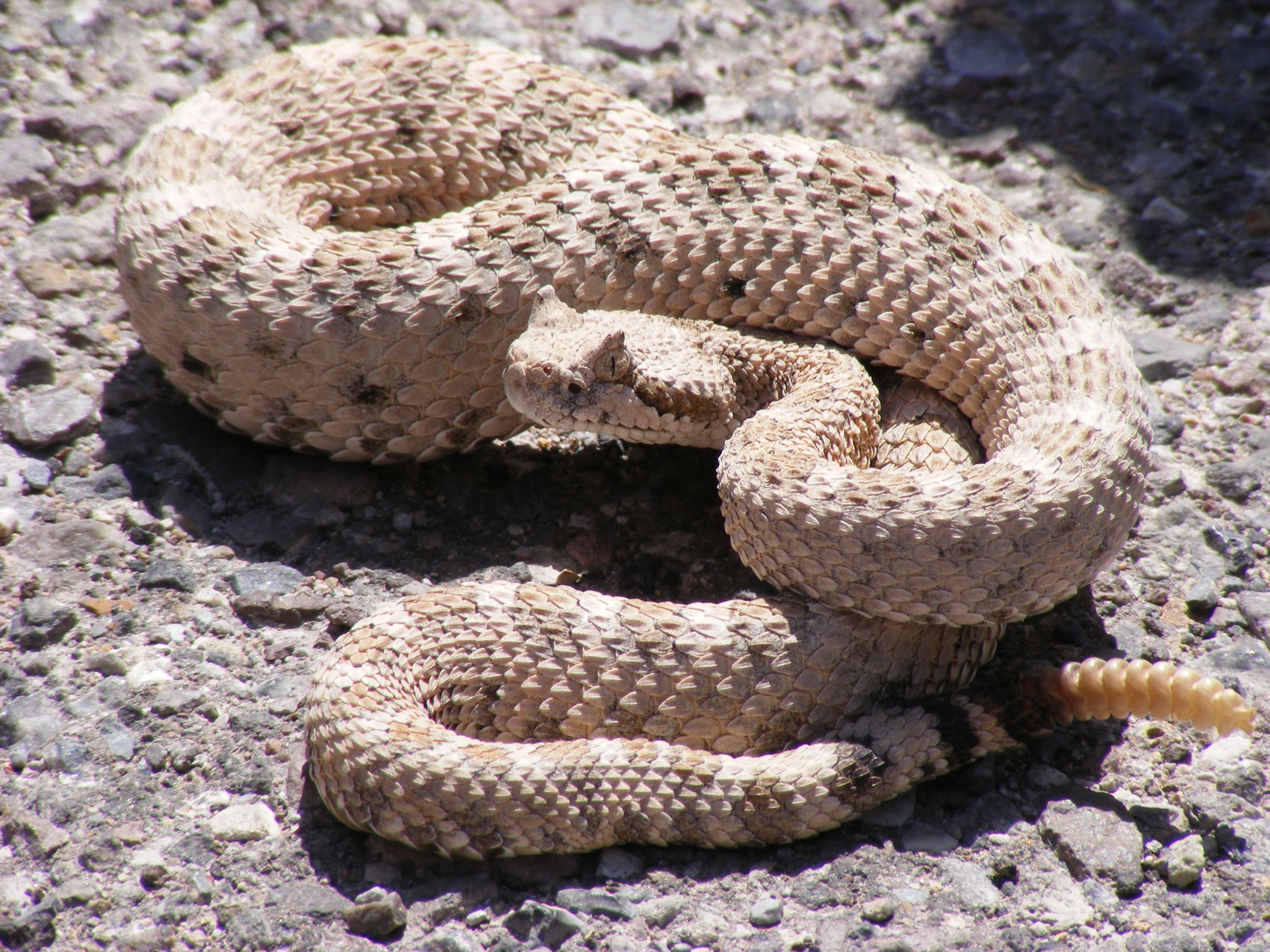
Crotalus cerastes

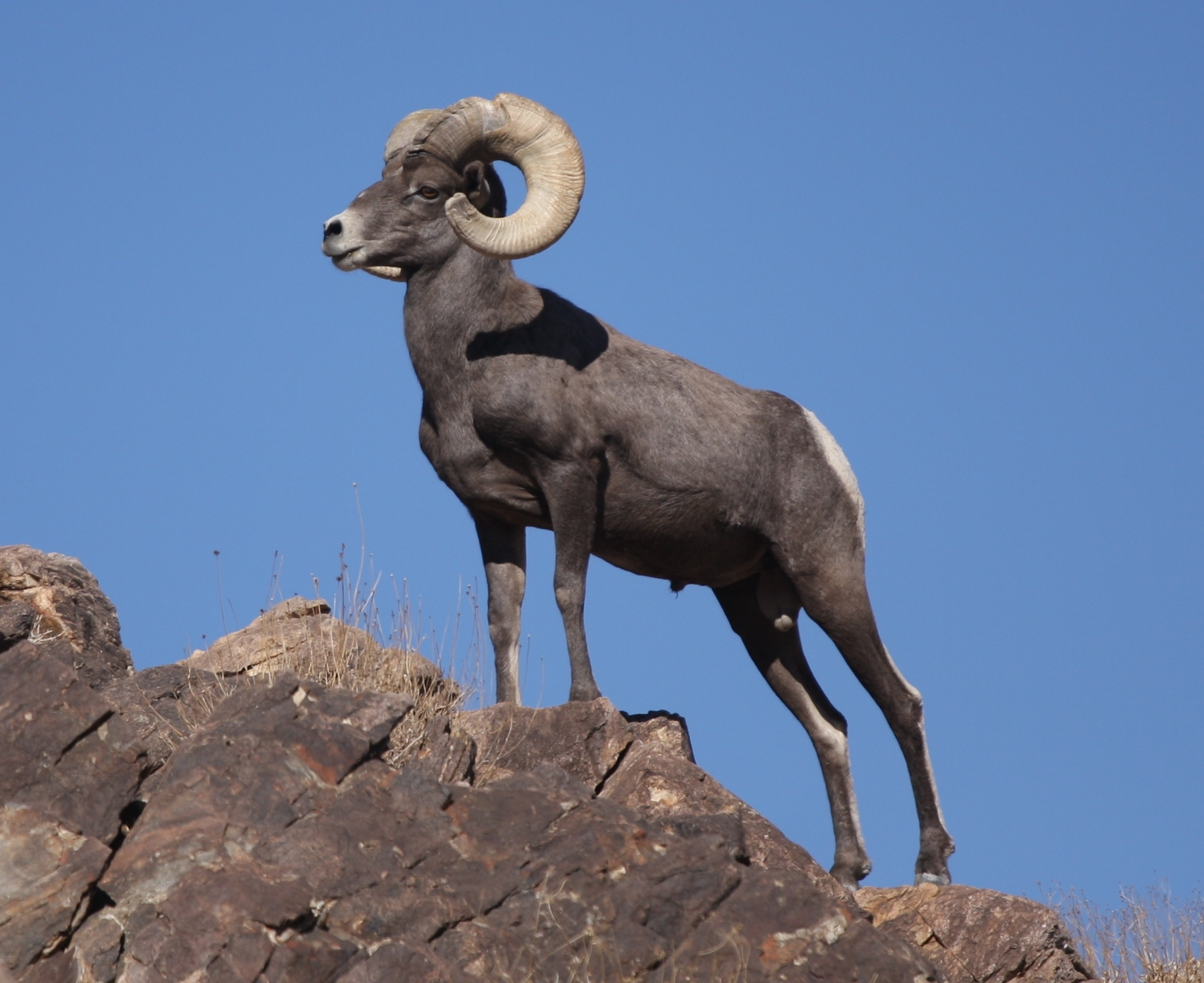
Bighorn sheep

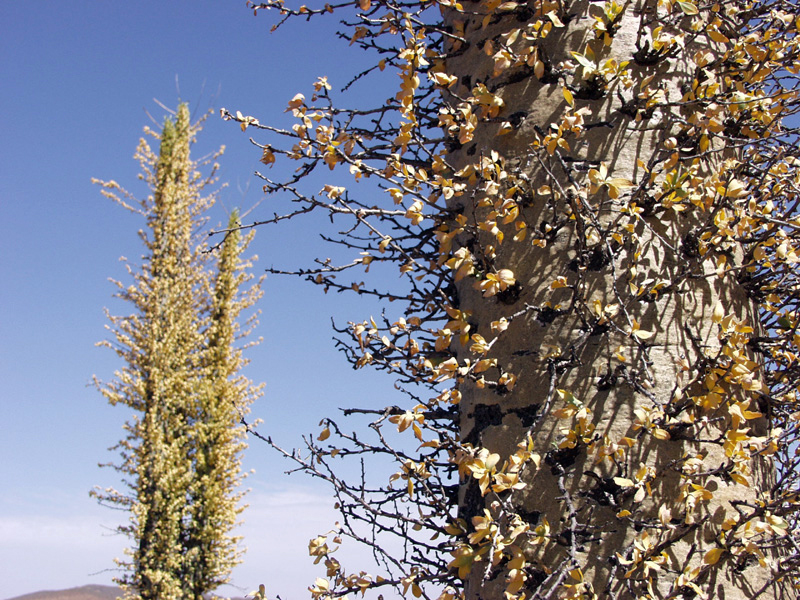
Fouquieria columnaris

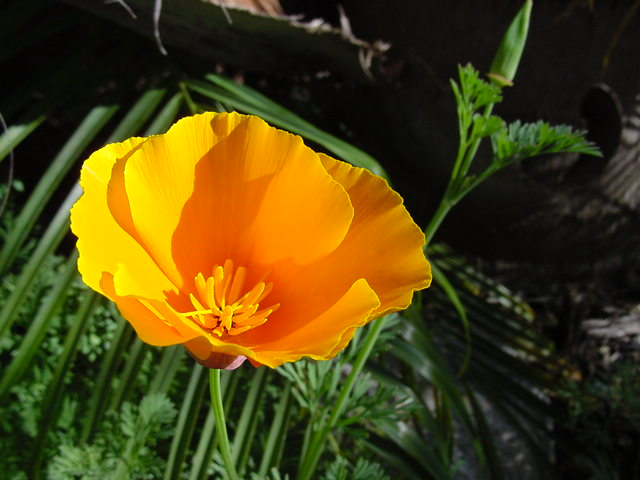
Eschscholzia californica

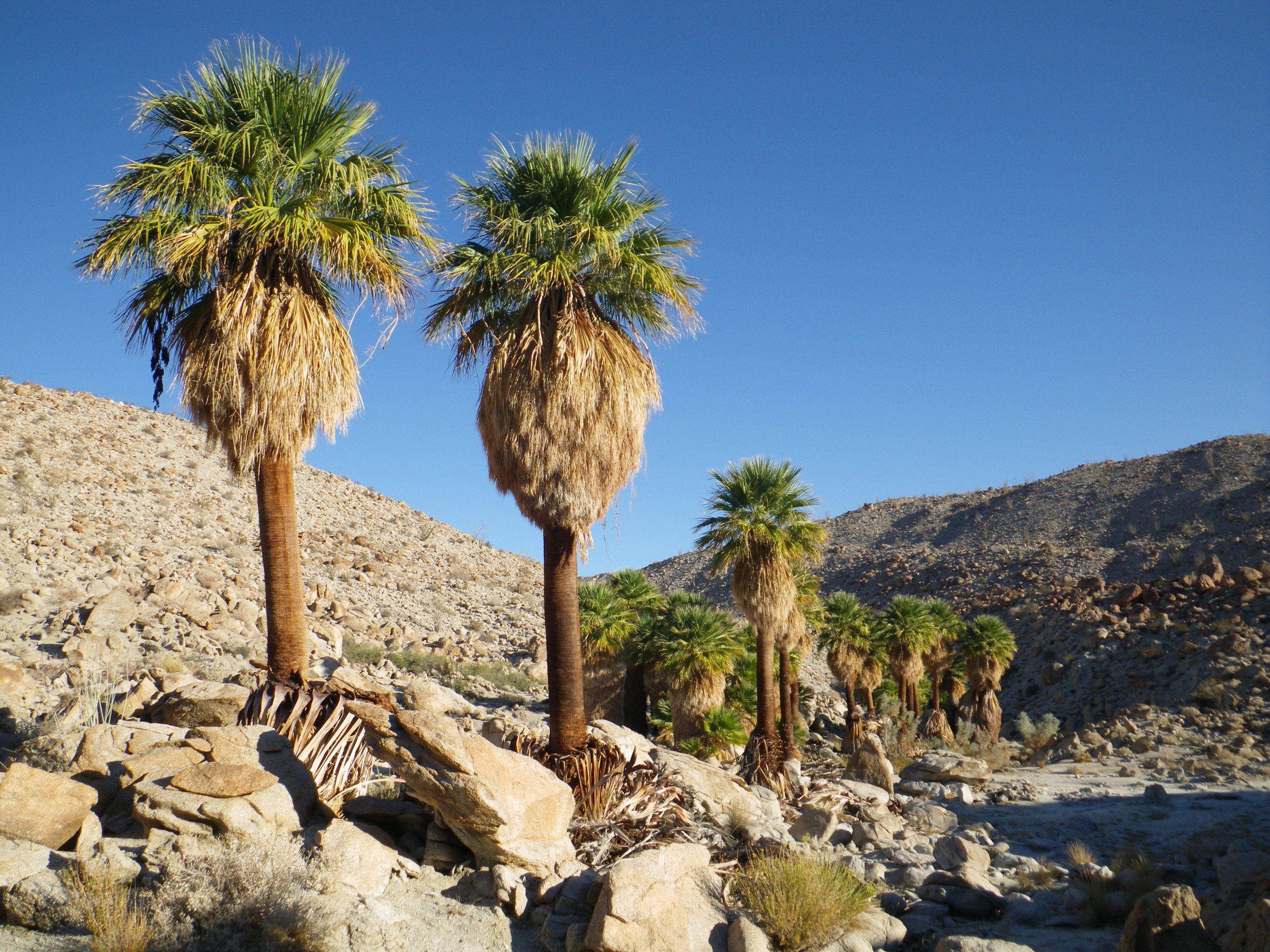
Washingtonia filifera

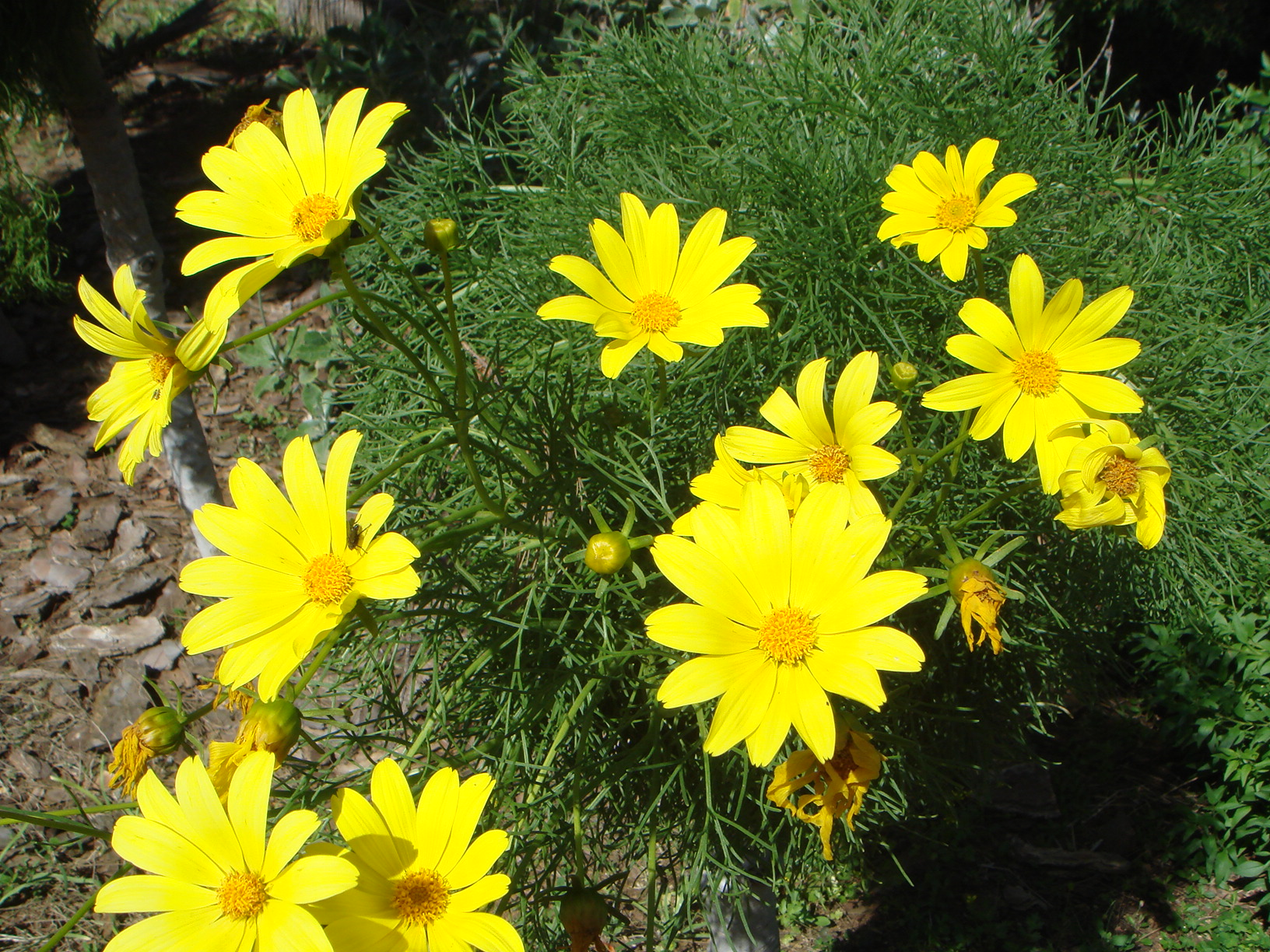
Coreopsis gigantea

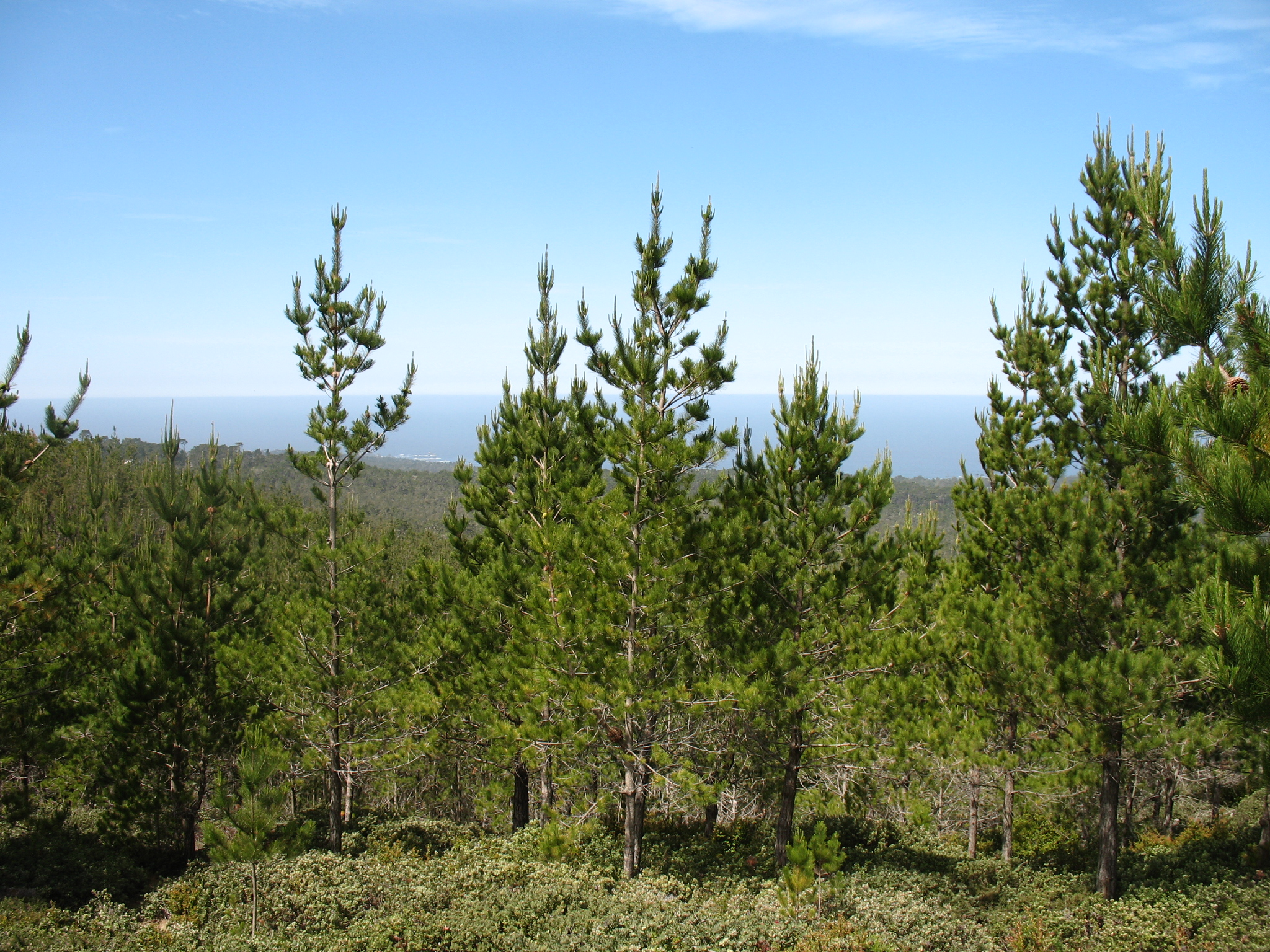
Pinus radiata

=== 2010 earthquakes ===
At 3:40:41 pm PDT on Easter Sunday, 4 April 2010, a 7.2 M_{w} (on the moment magnitude scale) magnitude northwest-trending strike-slip earthquake hit the Mexicali Valley, with its epicenter 26 km (16 mi) southwest of the city of Guadalupe Victoria, Baja California. The main shock was felt as far as the Los Angeles, Las Vegas, Phoenix and Tucson metropolitan areas, and in Yuma. At least a half-dozen aftershocks with magnitudes between 5.0 and 5.4 were reported, including a 5.1-magnitude shaker at 4:14 am that was centered near El Centro. As of 6:31 am PDT on 5 April 2010, two people were confirmed dead.

== Government ==
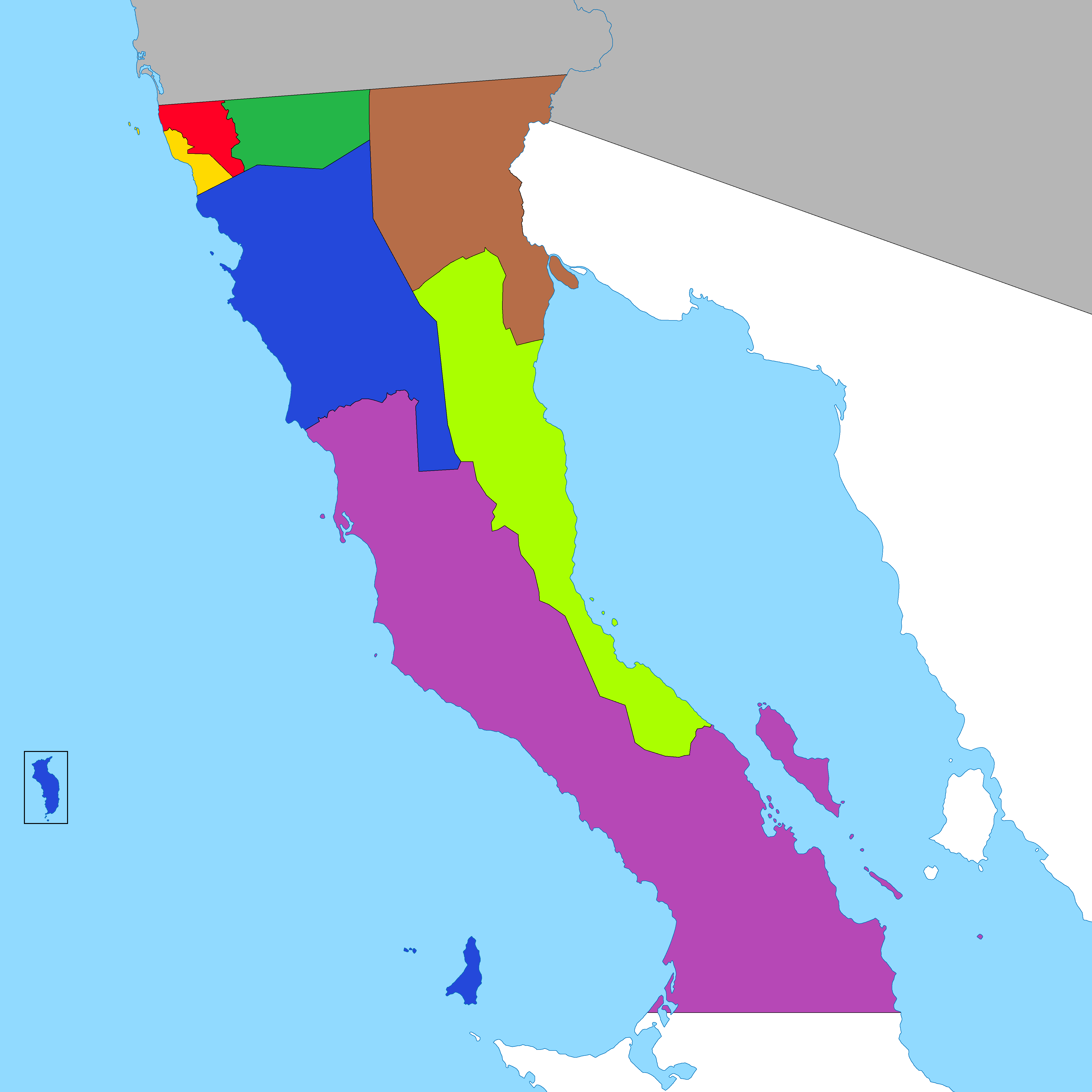
Municipalities of Baja California in 2022

=== Municipalities of Baja California ===
Baja California is subdivided into seven municipios ('municipalities'): Ensenada, Mexicali, Tecate, Tijuana, Rosarito, San Quintín and San Felipe.

=== Foreign relations ===
Baja California is a member of the Commission of the Californias, a tri-lateral forum for cooperation between the U.S. state of California and the Mexican states of Baja California and Baja California Sur.

== Politics ==
=== State elections ===
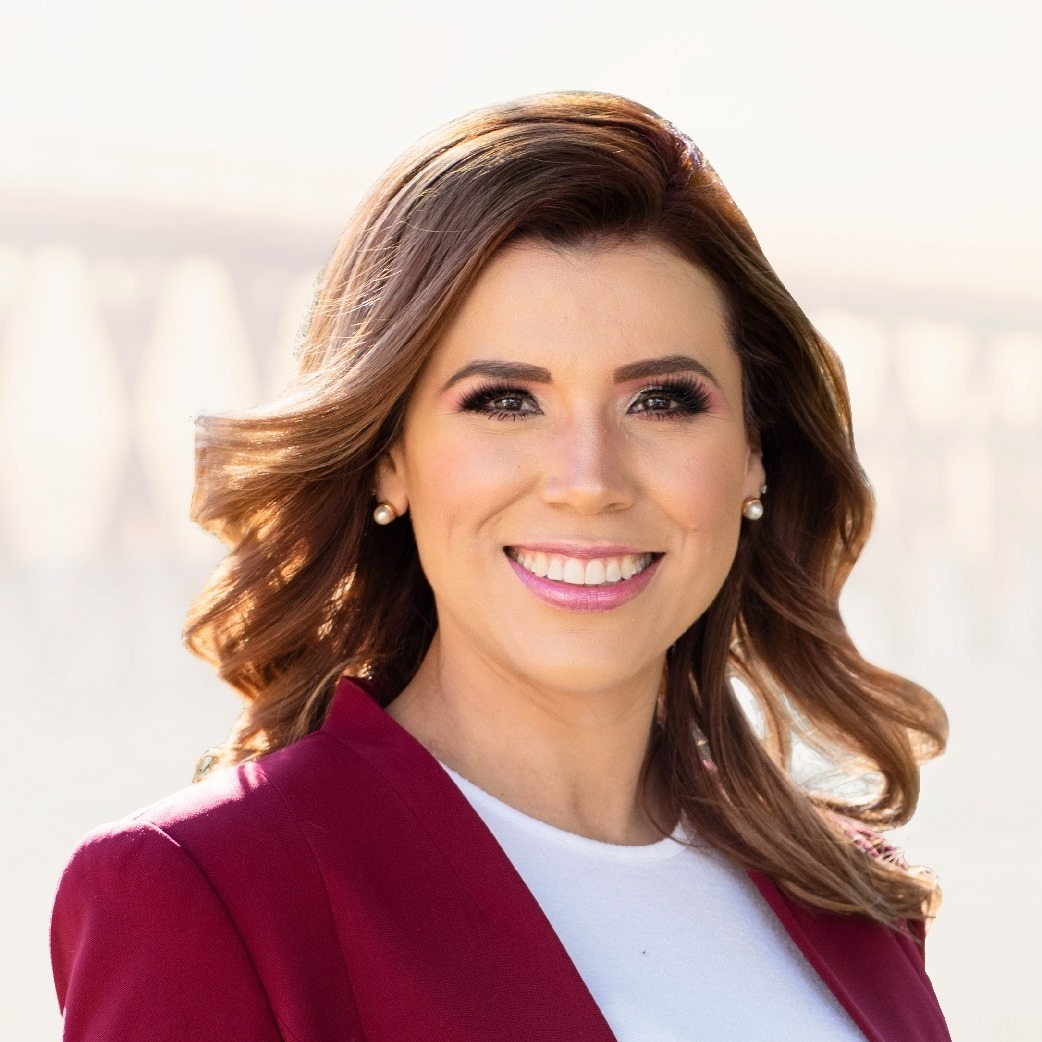
Marina del Pilar Ávila Olmeda, the governor of Baja California since 2021

In Baja California, state elections are held every two years (every three years prior to 2019) for the positions of state governor, 25 state deputies of the Congress of Baja California, and 5 municipal mayors. Of the 25 state deputies, 17 are elected by relative majority in each of the electoral districts, while another 8 are elected by proportional representation. The 17 deputies elected by relative majority may be re-elected for up to four consecutive terms, while the other 8 deputies can only serve one term.

During the 2019 Baja California state election, Jaime Bonilla Valdez of the Morena-led Juntos Hacemos Historia coalition won by a margin of 27.58% to become the governor of Baja California. In addition, 21 out of 25 state deputy positions and all 5 municipal mayoral positions were won by candidates aligned with the Juntos Hacemos Historia coalition.

During the 2021 Baja California state election, Marina del Pilar Ávila Olmeda of the Morena-led Juntos Hacemos Historia coalition won by a margin of 17.49% to become the first female governor of Baja California. Of the state's 25 local deputies, 13 were won by Morena-aligned candidates, followed in a distant second place by candidates of the Solidarity Encounter Party (PES), National Action Party (PAN), and Labor Party (PT) with 3 seats each. All 5 municipal mayoral positions were again won by Morena-aligned candidates.

In the 2024 Baja California state election, Morena gained an extra seat in the State Congress.

=== Federal elections ===
Presidential election results
| Year | PRI | PAN | PRD | MORENA |
|---|---|---|---|---|
| 2018 | 8.86% 94,296 | 19.33% 205,747 | | 63.10% 671,599 |
| 2012 | 36.99% 446,192 | 27.20% 328,116 | 31.15% 375,803 | |
| 2006 | 21.38% 203,233 | 47.35% 450,186 | 23.59% 224,275 | |
| 2000 | 37.04% 319,477 | 49.76% 429,194 | 8.97% 77,340 | |
| 1994 | 48.92% 402,332 | 36.18% 297,565 | 8.35% 68,669 | |

During the 2018 Mexican general election, the presidential vote of Baja California was won by a landslide of almost 44% by Andrés Manuel López Obrador of the Morena party. Out of the 8 federal deputies representing Baja California in the Mexican Chamber of Deputies, 5 were won by Morena candidates, 2 were won by Social Encounter Party candidates, and 1 was won by a Labor Party candidate. The next Mexican general election is scheduled for 2024.

During the 2021 Mexican legislative election, six of the eight federal deputies representing Baja California in the Mexican Chamber of Deputies were won by Morena candidates, with the other two being won by candidates of the Labor and Ecologist Green parties. The next legislative elections are scheduled for 2024.

== Demographics ==
Largest cities or towns in Baja California Source:
| Rank | Name | Municipality | Pop. |
|---|---|---|---|
| 1 | Tijuana | Tijuana | 1,810,645 |
| 2 | Mexicali | Mexicali | 854,186 |
| 3 | Ensenada | Ensenada | 330,652 |
| 4 | Rosarito | Playas de Rosarito | 100,660 |
| 5 | Tecate | Tecate | 81,059 |
| 6 | Villa del Campo | Tijuana | 33,360 |
| 7 | Maneadero | Ensenada | 27,969 |
| 8 | Guadalupe Victoria | Mexicali | 19,081 |
| 9 | Lázaro Cárdenas | San Quintín | 18,829 |
| 10 | San Felipe | San Felipe | 17,143 |

Historical population
| Year | Pop. | ±% |
|---|---|---|
| 1895 | 7,268 | — |
| 1900 | 7,583 | +4.3% |
| 1910 | 9,760 | +28.7% |
| 1921 | 23,537 | +141.2% |
| 1930 | 48,327 | +105.3% |
| 1940 | 78,907 | +63.3% |
| 1950 | 226,965 | +187.6% |
| 1960 | 520,165 | +129.2% |
| 1970 | 870,421 | +67.3% |
| 1980 | 1,177,886 | +35.3% |
| 1990 | 1,660,855 | +41.0% |
| 1995 | 2,112,140 | +27.2% |
| 2000 | 2,487,367 | +17.8% |
| 2005 | 2,844,469 | +14.4% |
| 2010 | 3,155,070 | +10.9% |
| 2015 | 3,315,766 | +5.1% |
| 2020 | 3,769,020 | +13.7% |
2015 data from Encuesta Intercensal 2015.

Religion in Baja California (2010 census)
| Roman Catholicism | 72.1% |
| Other Christian | 15.1% |
| Other religion | 0.1% |
| No religion | 10.0% |
| Unspecified | 2.7% |

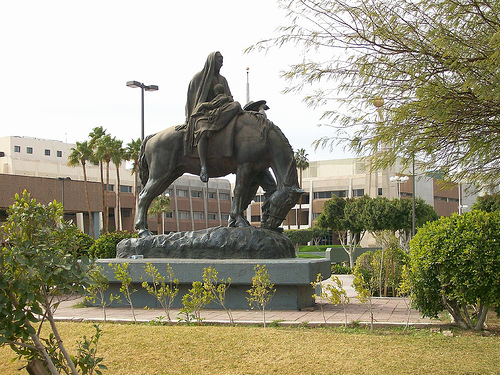
Los Pioneros monument in Mexicali, dedicated to the pioneers who settled the region

Although the state is predominantly European in ancestry, it has historically seen a sizable East and Southeast Asian immigrant population. Mexicali has a large Chinese community, as well as many Filipinos who arrived to the state during the eras of Spanish Philippines and American rule (1898–1946) in much of the 19th and 20th centuries. Tijuana and Ensenada were major ports of entry for East Asians entering the U.S. ever since the first Asian Americans were present in California.

According to the 2020 Census, 1.71% of Baja California's population identified as Black, Afro-Mexican, or of African descent.

Since 1960, large numbers of migrants from southern Mexican states have arrived to work in agriculture (especially the Mexicali Valley and nearby Imperial Valley, California, U.S.) and manufacturing. The cities of Ensenada, Tijuana, and Mexicali grew as a result of migrants, primarily those who sought U.S. citizenship. Those temporary residents awaiting their entry into the United States are called flotillas, which is derived from the Spanish word flota, meaning 'fleet'.

There is also a sizable immigrant community from Central and South America, and from the United States and Canada. An estimated 200,000+ American expatriates live in the state, especially in coastal resort towns such as Ensenada, known for affordable homes purchased by retirees who continue to hold U.S. citizenship. San Felipe, Rosarito and Tijuana also have a large American population (second largest in Mexico after Mexico City), particularly for their cheaper housing and proximity to San Diego.

Some 60,000 Oaxacans live in Baja California. Some 40% of them lack proper birth certificates.

According to a Consejo Nacional de Ciencia y Tecnología (Conacyt) investigator, a little under a million people were classified as "poor" in the state, up from 2008 when there were roughly 810,000. Exactly who these people are, whether locals, interstate or international migrants, was not explained.

== Education ==
Baja California offers one of the best educational programs in the country, with high rankings in schooling and achievement.

The state government provides education and qualification courses to increase the workforce standards, such as school–enterprise linkage programs which help the development of a labor force according to the needs of the industry.

91.60% of the population from six to fourteen years of age attend elementary school. 61.95% of the population over fifteen years of age attends or has already graduated from high school. Public school is available in all levels from kindergarten to university.

The state has 32 universities offering 103 professional degrees. These universities have 19 research and development centers for basic and applied investigation in advanced projects related to biotechnology, physics, oceanography, computer science, digital geothermal technology, astronomy, aerospace, electrical engineering and clean energy, among others. At this educational level, supply is steadily growing. Baja California has developed a need to be self-sufficient in matters of technological and scientific innovation and to be less dependent on foreign countries. Current businesses demand new production processes as well as technology for the incubation of companies. The number of graduate degrees offered, including PhD programs, is 121. The state has 53 graduate schools.

== Economy ==
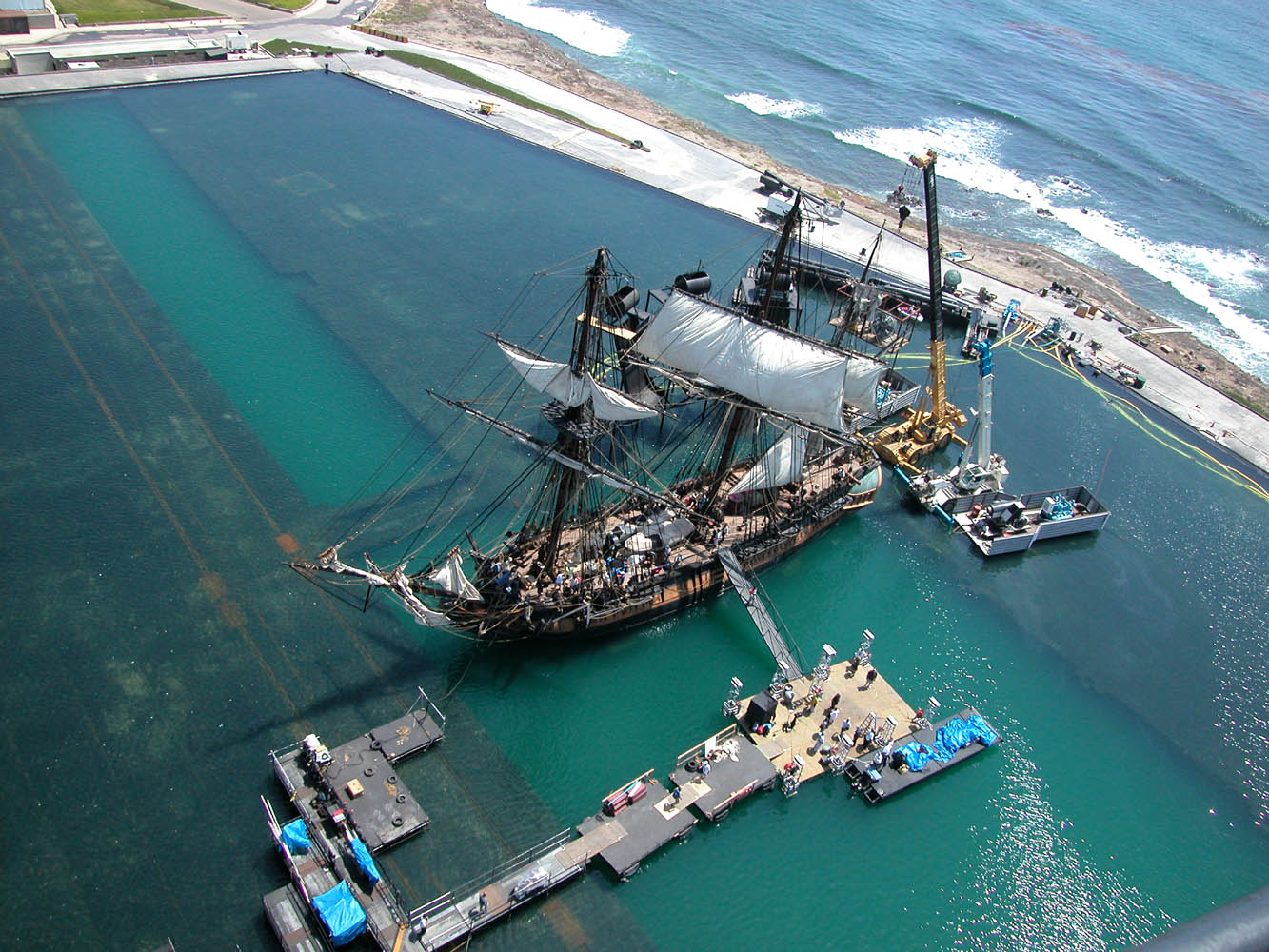
Filming of Master and Commander at Baja Film Studios. Located in Rosarito, Baja Film Studios has become one of the premier production facilities with horizon tanks.

As of 2005, Baja California's economy represents 3.3% of Mexico's gross domestic product, or US$21.996 billion. Baja California's economy has a strong focus on tariff-free export oriented manufacturing (maquiladora). As of 2005, 284,255 people are employed in the manufacturing sector. There are more than 900 companies operating under the federal Prosec program in Baja California.

=== Employment ===
In 2021, Baja California generated 57,550 new jobs, about 15.2 jobs per 1,000 inhabitants, making it the 5th highest in the country and the second highest of any border state behind Nuevo León (86,364 new jobs). The majority of these new jobs were generated in and around the cities of Tijuana, Mexicali, Ensenada, Playas de Rosarito, and Tecate. Industries that experienced the highest degree of growth in 2021 include transformative industries, transport and communication, commerce, and construction.

As of November 2021, Baja California has the highest employment rate of any state in northern Mexico, with a rate of 96.7%.

=== Economic investment ===
As of September 2021, Baja California receives the third highest amount of foreign direct investment of any state in Mexico, constituting about 7.7% of the national total and behind only Nuevo León (7.7%) and Mexico City (16.5%). About 81.4% of Baja California's foreign domestic investment comes from the United States, of which 50.3% comes from the construction of natural gas pipelines and 8.2% comes car and truck manufacturing.

=== Real estate ===
The Foreign Investment Law of 1973 allows foreigners to purchase land within the borders and coasts of Mexico by way of a trust handled through a Mexican bank (Fideicomiso). This trust assures to the buyer all the rights and privileges of ownership, and it can be sold, inherited, leased, or transferred at any time. Since 1994, the Foreign Investment Law stipulates that the Fideicomiso must be to a 50-year term, with the option to petition for a 50-year renewal at any time.

Any Mexican citizen buying a bank trust property has the option to either remain within the trust or opt out of it and request the title in escritura.

Mexico's early history involved foreign invasions and the loss of vast amounts of land; in fear of history being repeated, the Mexican constitution established the concept of the "Restricted Zone". In 1973, in order to bring in more foreign tourist investment, the Bank Trust of Fideicomiso was created, thus allowing non-Mexicans to own land without any constitutional amendment necessary. Since the law went into effect, it has undergone many modifications in order to make purchasing land in Mexico a safer investment.

== Transport ==
=== Highways ===
- Mexican Federal Highway 1 or the Transpeninsular Highway, completed 1973, south from Tijuana 713 km (436 miles) via Ensenada and El Rosario to Baja California Sur at Guerrero Negro.
- Mexican Federal Highway 1D toll road from Ensenada 98 km to US I-5 at Tijuana.
- Mexican Federal Highway 2 from Tijuana 214 km east via Tecate, La Rumorosa and Mexicali to Sonora at San Luis Rio Colorado.
- Mexican Federal Highway 3 south from the US border at Tecate 112 km (70 miles) to Highway 1 at El Sauzal Rodriguez, just north of Ensenada (bypassing Tijuana), with a second segment from Highway 1 in Ensenada 196 km (122 miles) south-east via Real del Castillo to Highway 5 near the east coast in El Chinero, 55 km (34 miles) north of San Felipe (where all vehicles are subject to a military inspection).
- Mexican Federal Highway 5 south from Mexicali 401 km (249 miles) to Highway 1 in San Felipe on the east coast, where a state highway continues to Puertecitos.
- Mexican Federal Highway 12 east from Highway 1 68 km to Bahía de los Ángeles on the east coast.

=== Railroads ===
- Ferromex in Mexicali connects with Union Pacific's former Southern Pacific Railroad line at Calexio and runs east to Sonora at Riíto, with another line connecting with Yuma, Arizona across the Colorado River at Algodones.
- The Baja California Railroad operates the 71 km former Ferrocarril Tecate Tijuana line from the US San Diego and Imperial Valley Railroad in San Ysidro east via Tecate.

=== Airports ===
The state is served by these international airports:

- Tijuana International Airport
- Mexicali International Airport

However, San Diego International Airport is also used by air travellers from the state. It is located 34 kilometres (21 mi) north west of Tijuana city centre. The Tijuana airport can be accessible by Cross Border Xpress.

=== Waterways ===
Deep water ports at Ensenada (a major naval base) and Isla de Cedros.

== Media ==
Newspapers of Baja California include El Centinela, El informador de Baja California, El Mexicano (edición Tijuana), El Mexicano Segunda Edición, El Sol de Tijuana, El Vigía, Esto de las Californias, Frontera, La Crónica de Baja California, La Voz de la Frontera, and Semanario Zeta.

== See also ==
- History of the west coast of North America
- Las Californias
- List of Baja California cities
- Spanish missions in present-day Baja California
