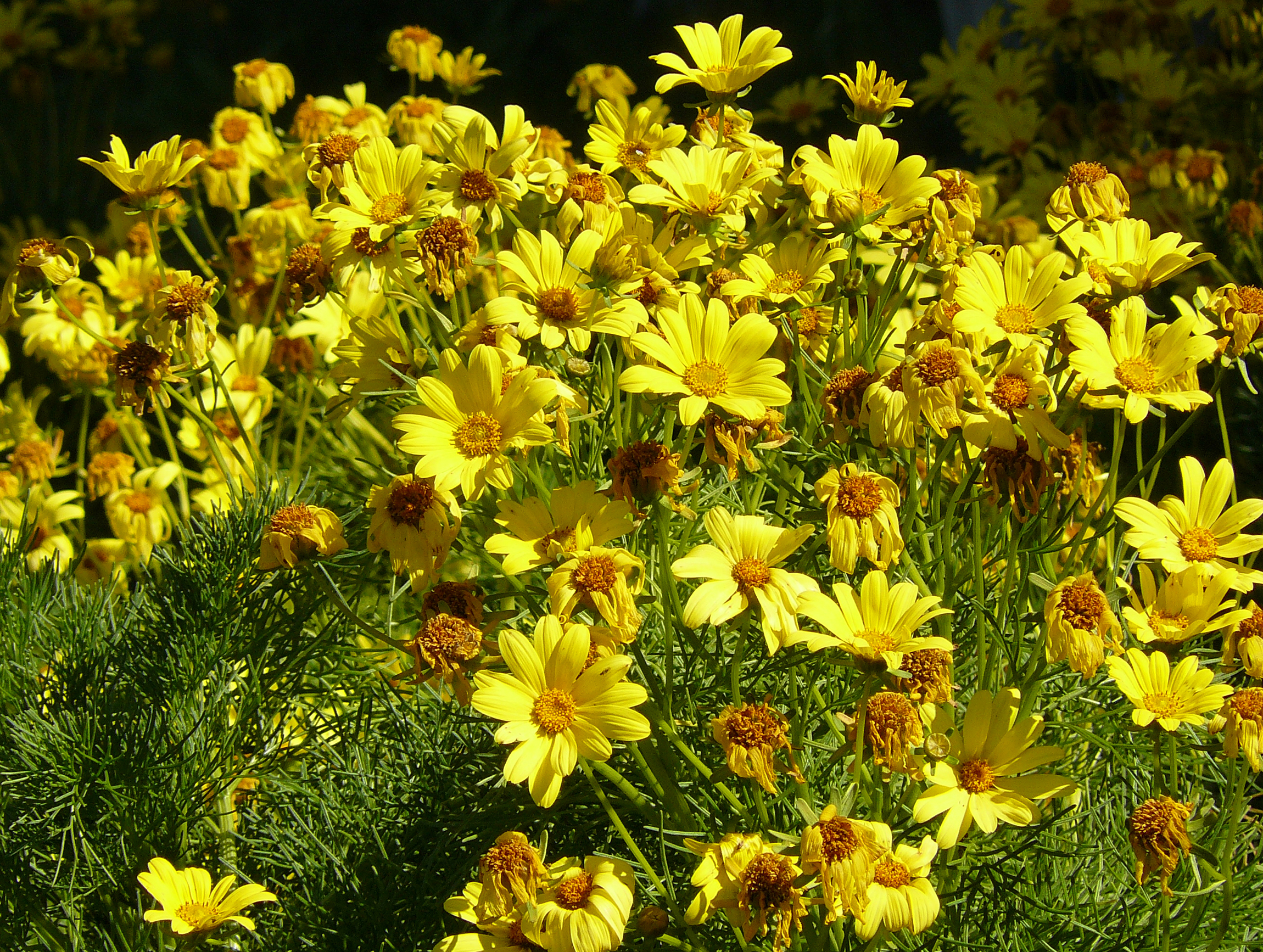

Scientific classification
- Kingdom: Plantae
- Clade: Tracheophytes
- Clade: Angiosperms
- Clade: Eudicots
- Clade: Asterids
- Order: Asterales
- Family: Asteraceae
- Genus: Leptosyne
- Species: L. gigantea

Binomial name
- Leptosyne gigantea Kellogg

Synonyms
- Coreopsis gigantea (Kellogg) H.M.Hall; Tuckermannia gigantea (Kellogg) M.E.Jones

= Leptosyne gigantea =

Species of flowering plant

Leptosyne gigantea, known by the common name giant coreopsis, is a woody perennial plant native to coastal regions of central and southern California and also to northern Baja California.

== Description ==
The stem of Leptosyne gigantea is a trunk up to 1 metre (3 1/2 feet) tall, and 4–10 centimetres (1 1/2–4 inches) in diameter. The plant can reach 3 m (10 ft) high by 0.61 m (2 ft) wide. It is summer deciduous, leaving a sculptural bare trunk and branches during the dry season.

Bright green leaves and flowers are on the top of the trunk, while the rest of the trunk is bare. The leaves are up to 30 cm (12 in) long.

The numerous flowers are yellow, daisy-like, 6–20 cm (2 1/2–8 in) in diameter. It blooms from the spring to early summer.

The related L. maritima is found in similar areas.

== Distribution and habitat ==
The plant is found in California coastal sage and chaparral habitats, from 14–55 m (45–180 ft) in elevation. It is found in coastal dunes, chaparral hillsides, and exposed sea bluff habitats.

It is distributed on the coasts of: Southern California and the Channel Islands; the Central Coast region; San Francisco Bay Area; and in Mexico on the northwestern Baja California Peninsula and Guadalupe Island.

It is restricted to nearly frost-free habitats because its stem is succulent, being cold tolerant to around 25 °F (−4 °C). Storing water in this way makes the plants tolerant of drought but especially susceptible to frost.

== Cultivation ==
Giant Coreopsis is cultivated as an ornamental plant by specialty nurseries. It is planted in native plant, drought tolerant, and wildlife gardens, and in natural landscaping and habitat restoration projects.

The plant needs good drainage and is not tolerant of excess moisture, needing minimal watering during the summer.
