= Coat of arms of Baja California =

Seal of the Free and Sovereign State of Baja California
- Armiger: State of Baja California
- Adopted: 1956

The Coat of arms of Baja California (Spanish: Escudo de Baja California, lit. "state shield of Baja California") is a symbol of the Free and Sovereign State of Baja California.

At the top of the coat of arms is a sun representing the state's energy. On the left and right are a woman holding a test tube and a man holding a book. Together they are holding lightning bolts, to represent the power of culture and science. At the bottom is a person with their arms stretched out around farms, factories, gears and fish, to represent the industries of Baja California.

== History ==
The coat of arms of Baja California was adopted in 1956, four years after it became a state (it was a territory before). The sun in the crest represents the state's energy and contains the text "Trabajo y Justicia Social" (Spanish for "Work and Social Justice").

=== Historical coats ===
The symbol is used by all successive regimes, in different forms.

Coat of arms from 1956 to 2015.

== See also ==
- Coat of arms of Mexico
- Flag of Baja California
