= George H. Sisson =

- Born: Michigan, United States

George H. Sisson was a nineteenth-century American entrepreneur. He was born in Michigan, and was an early real estate developer in Chicago. He was a mining engineer in Arizona, and with his profits from that operation, purchased a large land concession in Baja California.

== Baja California and Ensenada ==
On July 24, 1884, he and Luis Huller obtained a concession from the Mexican government for a tract of land in Baja California, extending between 29° North and 32°42' North, including Cedros Island. This was extended with additional purchases to 28° North, which later was to become the border between Baja California and Baja California Sur. Land was also purchased northward to the United States border. In 1885, they formed the International Company of Mexico in Hartford, Connecticut, and George H. Sisson was named as general manager. Eventually, the Huller Estate covered over 13,325,650 acres of land, a representation of the vast neocolonial inequities in Mexican land distribution during the Porfiriato. The company was sold to the British Mexican Land and Colonization Company in 1888. Related lawsuits continued for years afterward.
