= Proseč pod Křemešníkem =

- Municipality
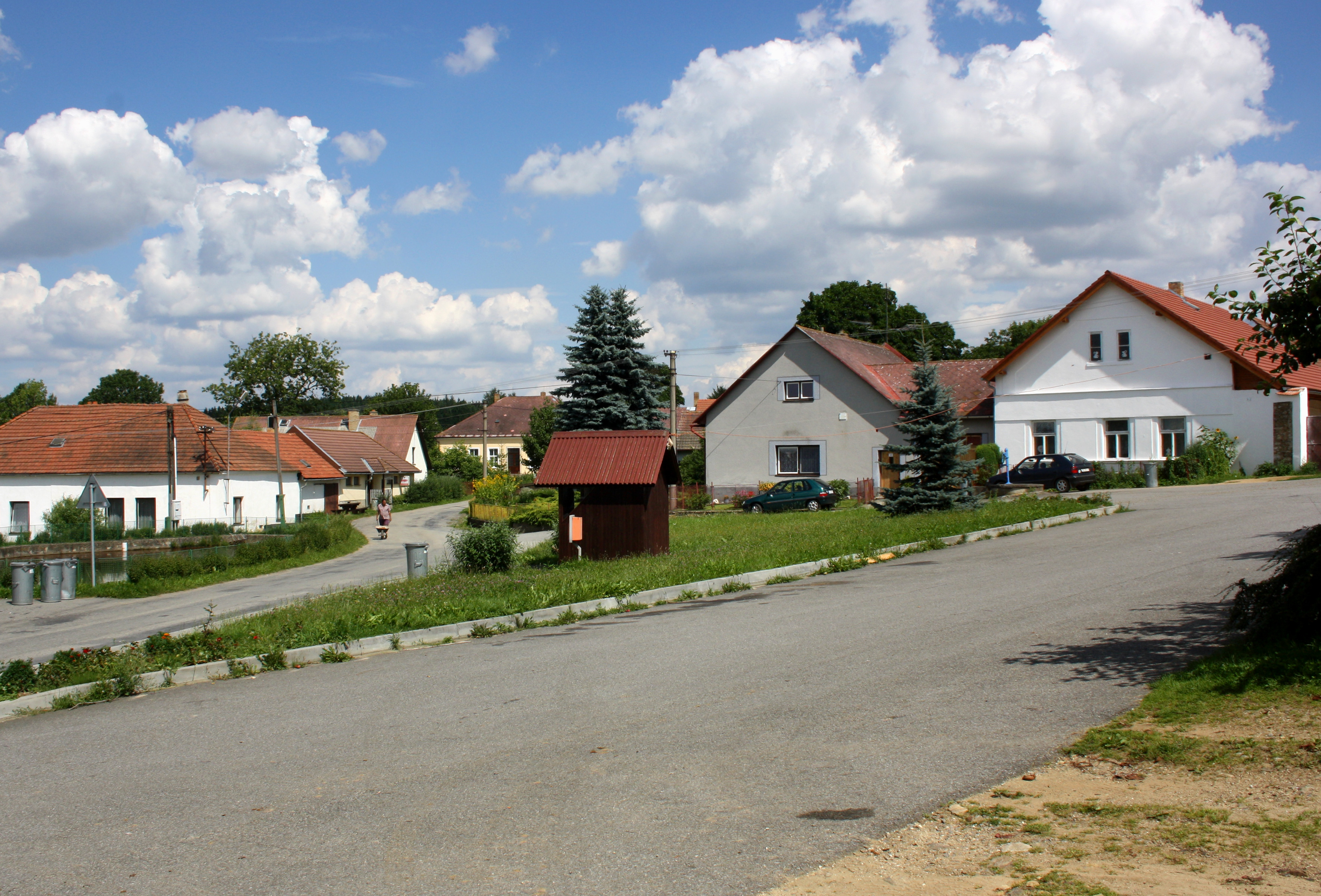
- Centre of Proseč pod Křemešníkem

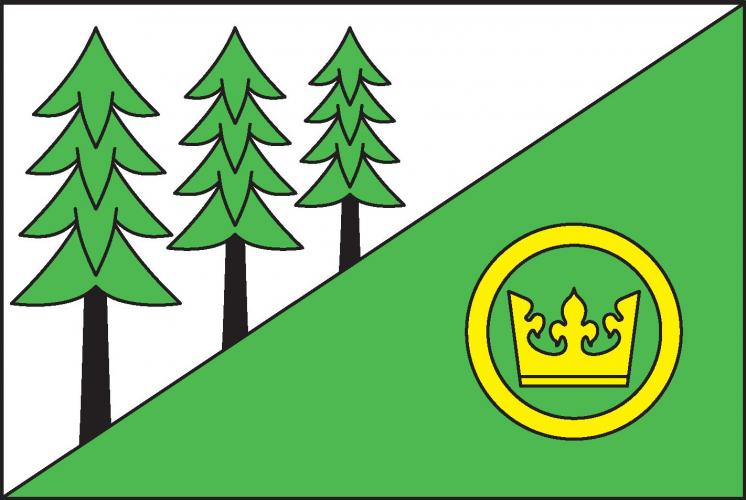
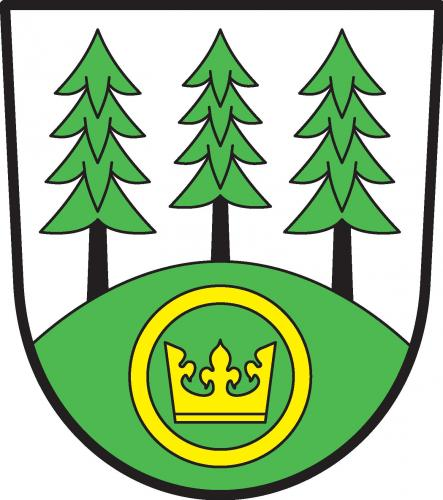
- Flag Coat of arms

- Location in the Czech Republic
- Coordinates: 49°24′55″N 15°17′42″E
- Country: Czech Republic
- Region: Vysočina
- District: Pelhřimov
- First mentioned: 1379

Area
  - Total: 5.32 km^{2} (2.05 sq mi)
- Elevation: 609 m (1,998 ft)

Population (2026-01-01)
  - Total: 93
  - Density: 17/km^{2} (45/sq mi)
- Time zone: UTC+1 (CET)
  - Summer (DST): UTC+2 (CEST)
- Postal code: 393 01
- Website: www.prosecpodkremesnikem.cz

Proseč pod Křemešníkem is a municipality and village in Pelhřimov District in the Vysočina Region of the Czech Republic. It has about 90 inhabitants.

Proseč pod Křemešníkem lies approximately 7 kilometres (4 mi) east of Pelhřimov, 22 km (14 mi) west of Jihlava, and 98 km (61 mi) south-east of Prague.

== Demographics ==
Historical population
| Year | Pop. | ±% |
|---|---|---|
| 1869 | 322 | — |
| 1880 | 312 | −3.1% |
| 1890 | 316 | +1.3% |
| 1900 | 268 | −15.2% |
| 1910 | 300 | +11.9% |
| 1921 | 297 | −1.0% |
| 1930 | 262 | −11.8% |
| 1950 | 175 | −33.2% |
| 1961 | 161 | −8.0% |
| 1970 | 143 | −11.2% |
| 1980 | 106 | −25.9% |
| 1991 | 75 | −29.2% |
| 2001 | 78 | +4.0% |
| 2011 | 84 | +7.7% |
| 2021 | 89 | +6.0% |
Source: Censuses
