= Proseč (Pelhřimov District) =

- Municipality
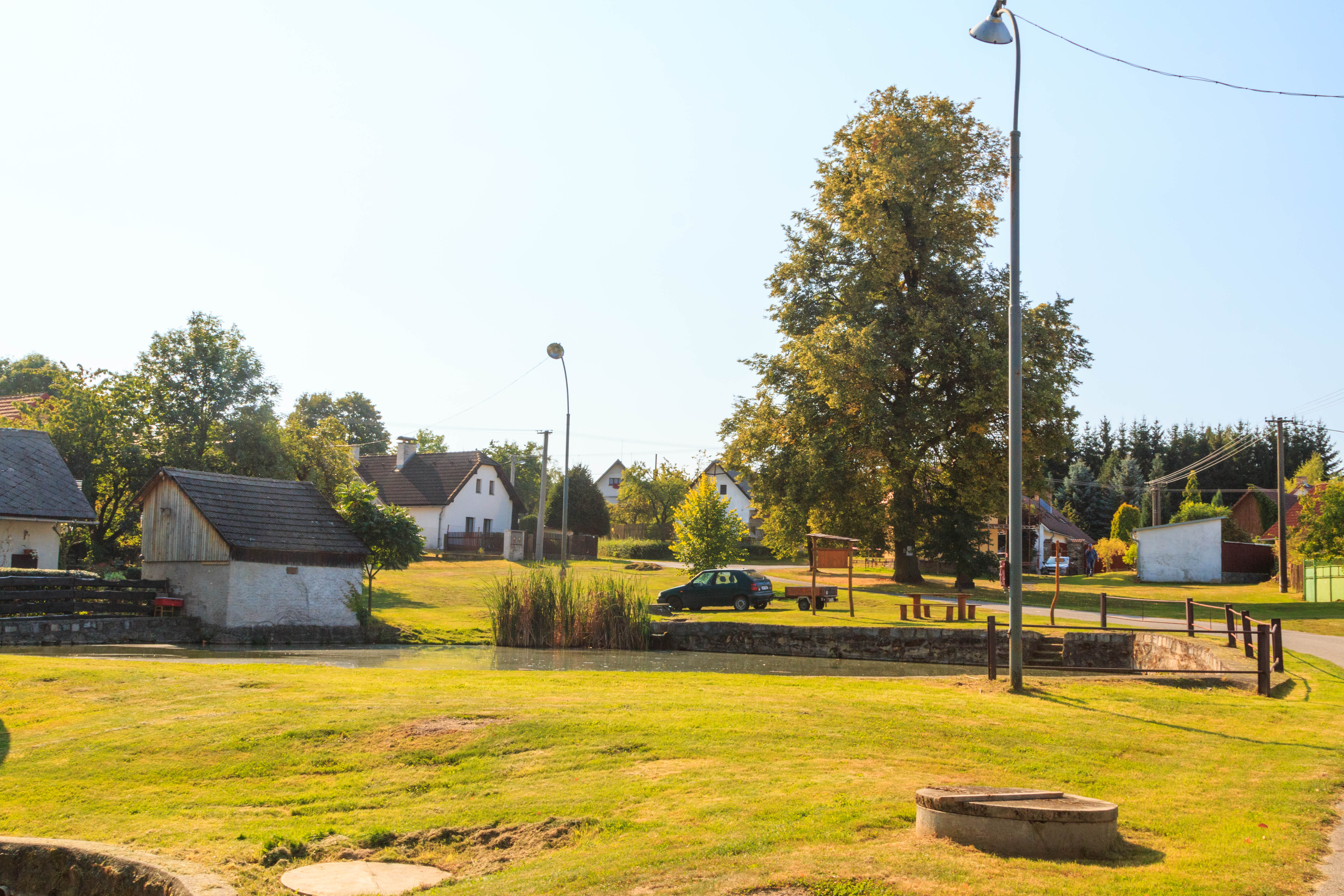
- Centre of Proseč

- Location in the Czech Republic
- Coordinates: 49°36′3″N 15°19′45″E
- Country: Czech Republic
- Region: Vysočina
- District: Pelhřimov
- First mentioned: 1391

Area
  - Total: 3.82 km^{2} (1.47 sq mi)
- Elevation: 581 m (1,906 ft)

Population (2026-01-01)
  - Total: 70
  - Density: 18/km^{2} (47/sq mi)
- Time zone: UTC+1 (CET)
  - Summer (DST): UTC+2 (CEST)
- Postal code: 396 01
- Website: www.prosecuhumpolce.cz

Proseč is a municipality and village in Pelhřimov District in the Vysočina Region of the Czech Republic. It has about 70 inhabitants.

Proseč lies approximately 21 kilometres (13 mi) north-east of Pelhřimov, 30 km (19 mi) north-west of Jihlava, and 85 km (53 mi) south-east of Prague.

== Demographics ==
Historical population
Year	Pop.	±%
1869	247	—
1880	242	−2.0%
1890	233	−3.7%
1900	243	+4.3%
1910	225	−7.4%
1921	244	+8.4%
1930	215	−11.9%
1950	174	−19.1%
1961	184	+5.7%
1970	161	−12.5%
1980	137	−14.9%
1991	85	−38.0%
2001	80	−5.9%
2011	83	+3.8%
2021	72	−13.3%
Source: Censuses
