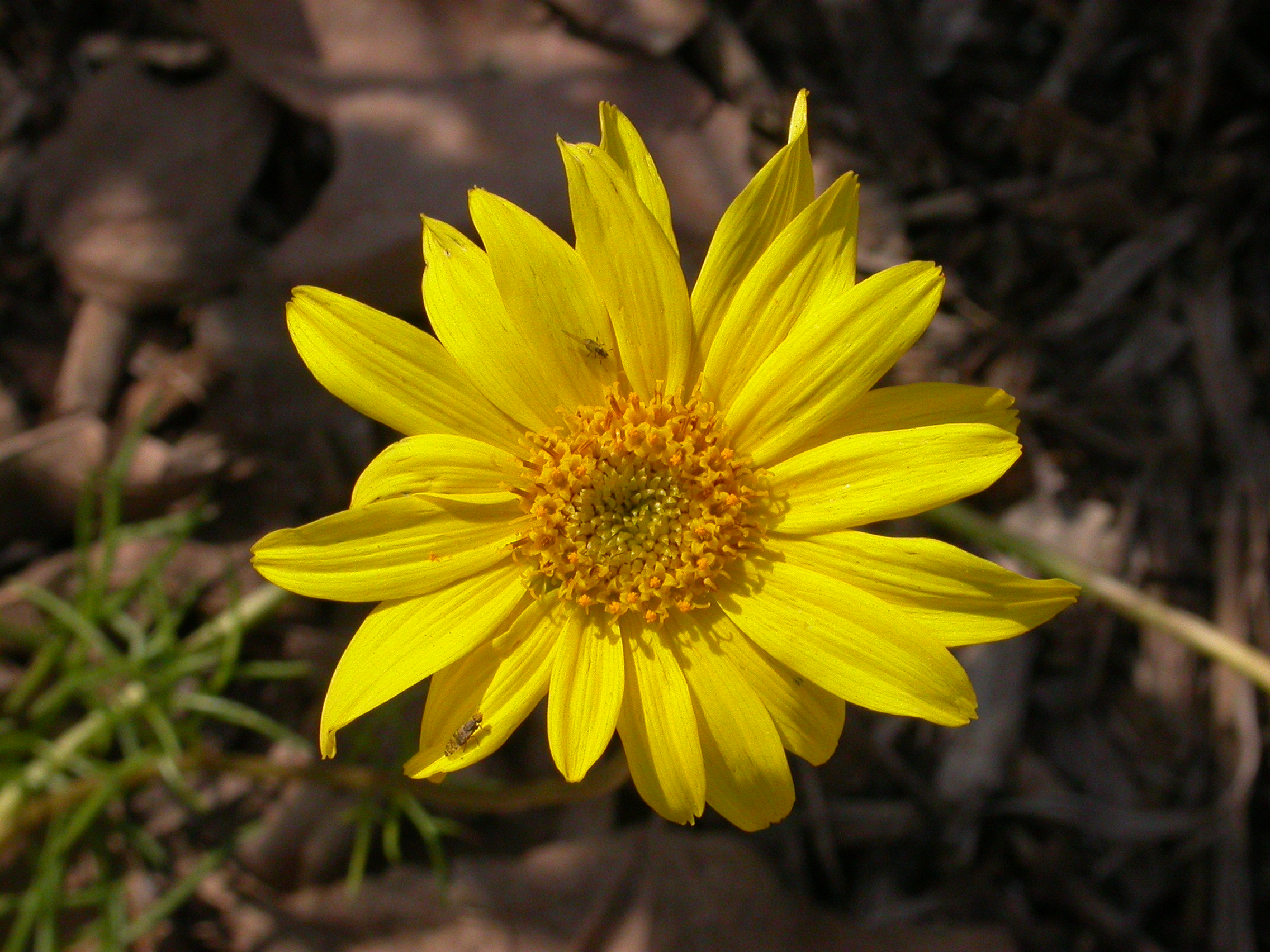

Conservation status
- Imperiled (NatureServe)

Scientific classification
- Kingdom: Plantae
- Clade: Tracheophytes
- Clade: Angiosperms
- Clade: Eudicots
- Clade: Asterids
- Order: Asterales
- Family: Asteraceae
- Genus: Leptosyne
- Species: L. maritima

Binomial name
- Leptosyne maritima (Nutt.) A.Gray

Synonyms
- Coreopsis maritima (Nutt.) Hook.f.; Tuckermannia maritima Nutt.

= Leptosyne maritima =

Species of flowering plant

Leptosyne maritima, the sea dahlia, is a species of tickseed in the sunflower family.

Leptosyne maritima is native to Southern California and Baja California, primarily in coastal California chaparral and woodlands habitats. It grows on mainland ocean bluffs in San Diego County and in northern Baja California, with a few isolated populations reported from just west of Malibu in Los Angeles County, Santa Cruz Island in Santa Barbara County, and Stoddard Canyon north of Rancho Cucamonga in extreme southwestern San Bernardino County.

== Description ==
Leptosyne maritima is a perennial that grows 10–40 cm tall but sometimes to 80 cm (4 to 32 inches). The plant has foliage that is lobed and mostly linear in shape, with lobes that are 5–30 mm long and 1–2 mm wide. The 12–20 mm long flower phyllaries number 12–13, sometimes more, and they are lanceolate.

Plants bloom in late winter to early summer, with normally one or two flower heads per stem, on 15 to 30 cm long peduncles, but sometimes 4 or more heads can be found per stem. Flower heads have 16-21 ray florets with laminae 20–35+ mm long.

The disc corollas are 5.5–7 mm long.

Cypselae or fruits are 6–7 mm long and oblong-rectangular.
