= Prosec Mexico =

Prosec (Program of Sectoral Promotion) is a program started by the Mexican government after the implementation of the North American Free Trade Agreement (NAFTA) to overcome the challenges faced by international factories (maquiladoras)) in Mexico resulting from NAFTA article 3. Article 3 states that no NAFTA member can waive or reduce import tariffs conditioned upon the export of the finished good to another NAFTA country. The result was that after Mexico joined NAFTA the tariff rates for many of the raw materials used by maquiladora manufacturing companies would have risen significantly, particularly for goods of Chinese origin.

Prosec is a tariff-reduction measure that avoids running into problems with NAFTA article 3 by allowing either foreign or domestic producers, irrespective of whether the finished good is intended for exportation or domestic sale, to petition the government for a reduction or elimination of a tariff rate.

== Applicable sectors ==
Prosec only applies to certain sectors of the Mexican economy including automotive, textile and electronics.
