= Cataviña =

Cataviña, Baja California
- Town
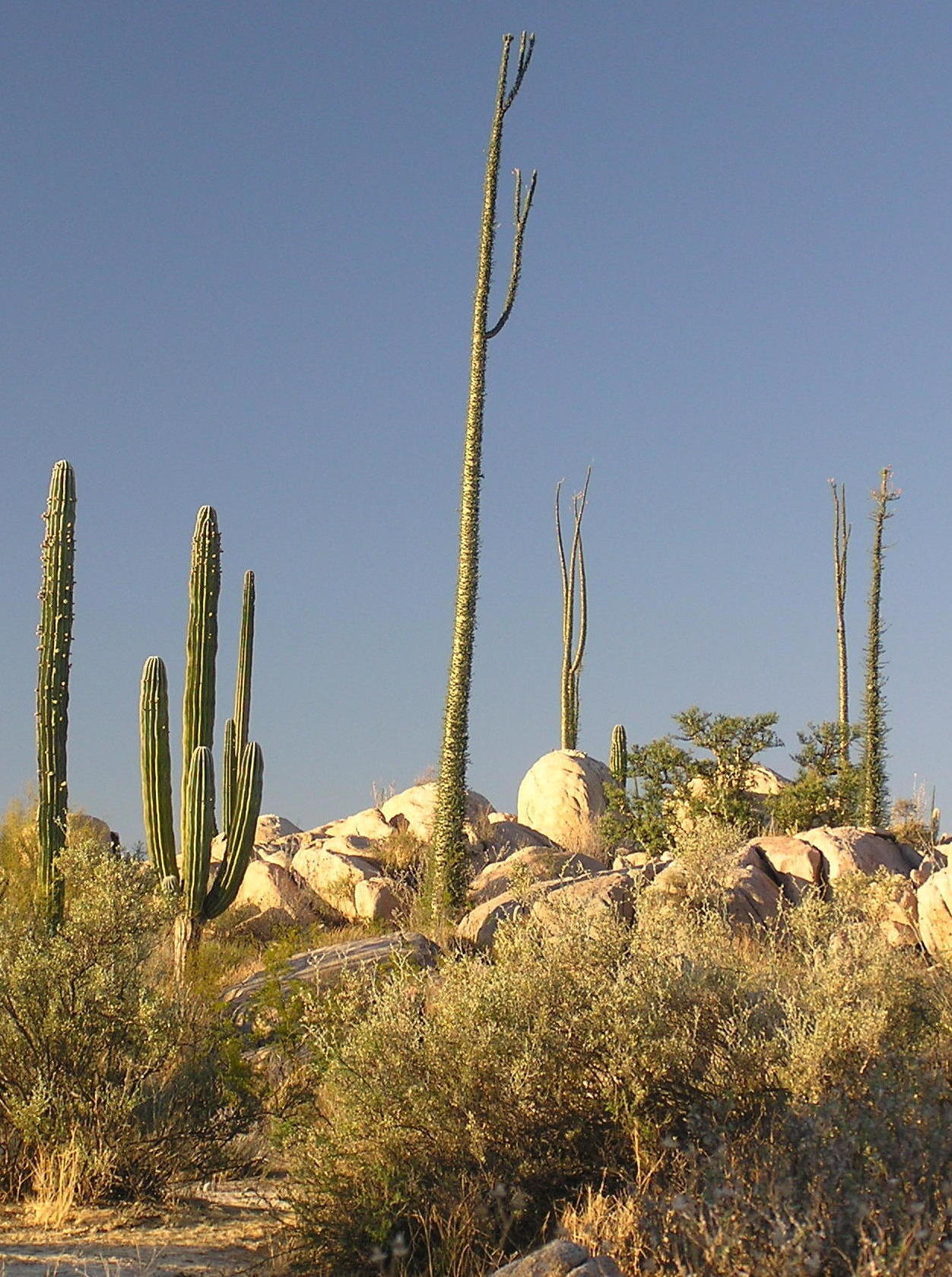
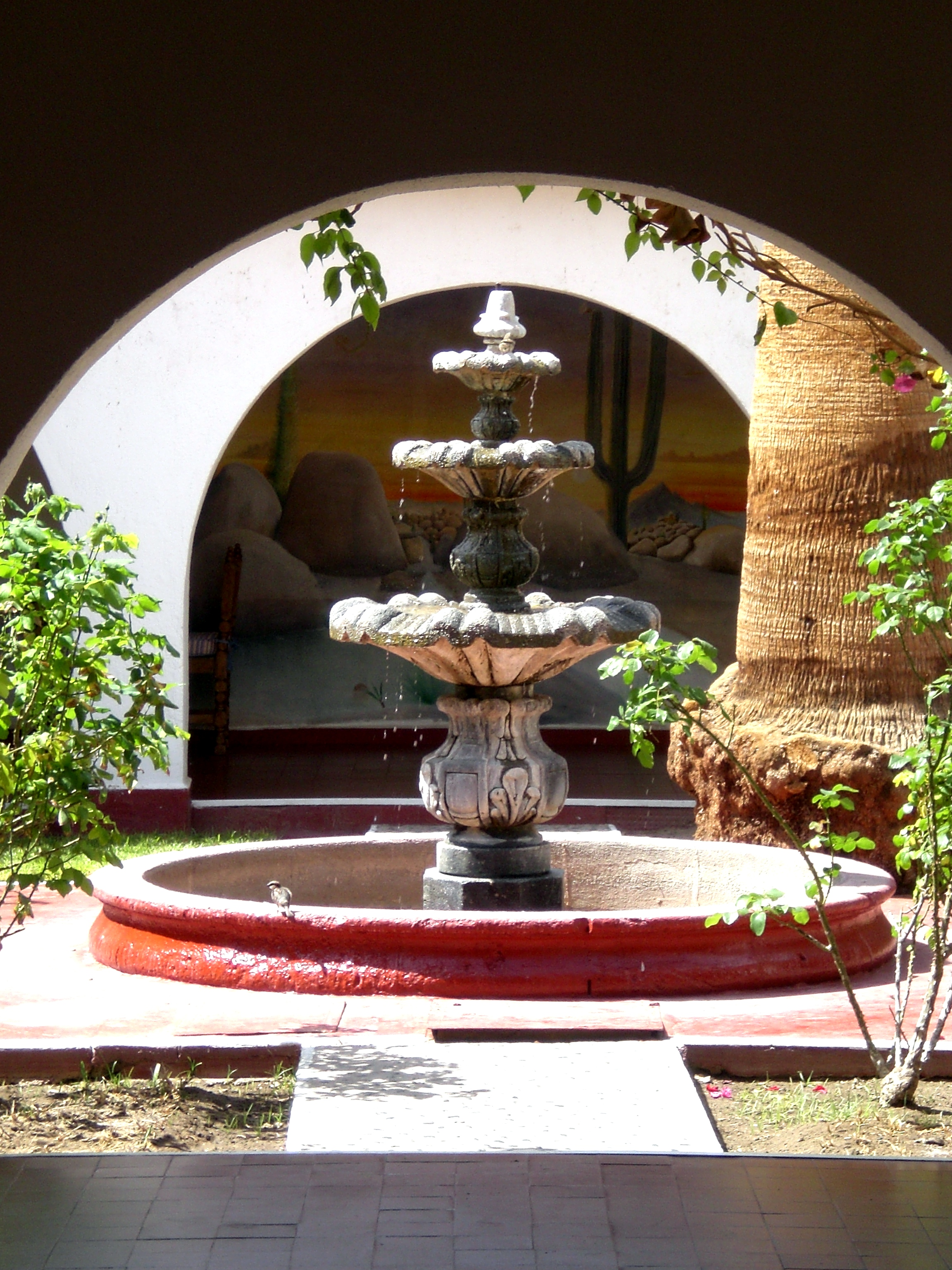
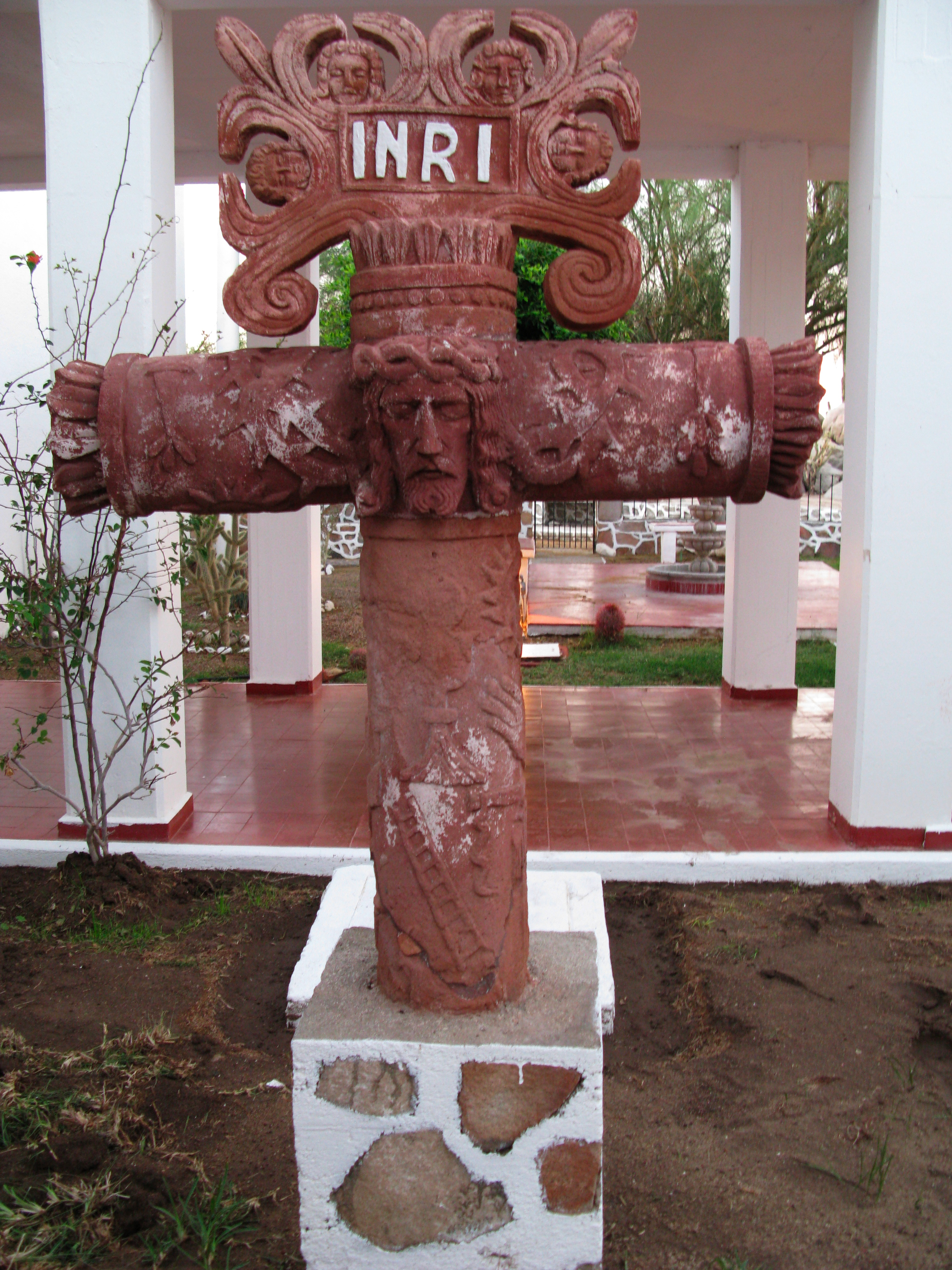

- Location in Mexico
- Coordinates: 29°43′55″N 114°43′15″W
- Country: Mexico
- State: Baja California
- Municipality: San Quintín
- Elevation: 1,841 ft (561 m)

Population (2010)
  - Town: 159
  - Urban: 0
- Time zone: UTC-8 (Northwest US Pacific)
  - Summer (DST): UTC-7 (Northwest)

Cataviña is a town in San Quintín Municipality, Baja California.

== Geography ==
It is located 118 km (74 mi) south of El Rosario and 106 km (66 mi) north of the junction of Federal Highway 12 to Bahía de los Ángeles. It is accessible by Federal Highway 1.

== Economy ==
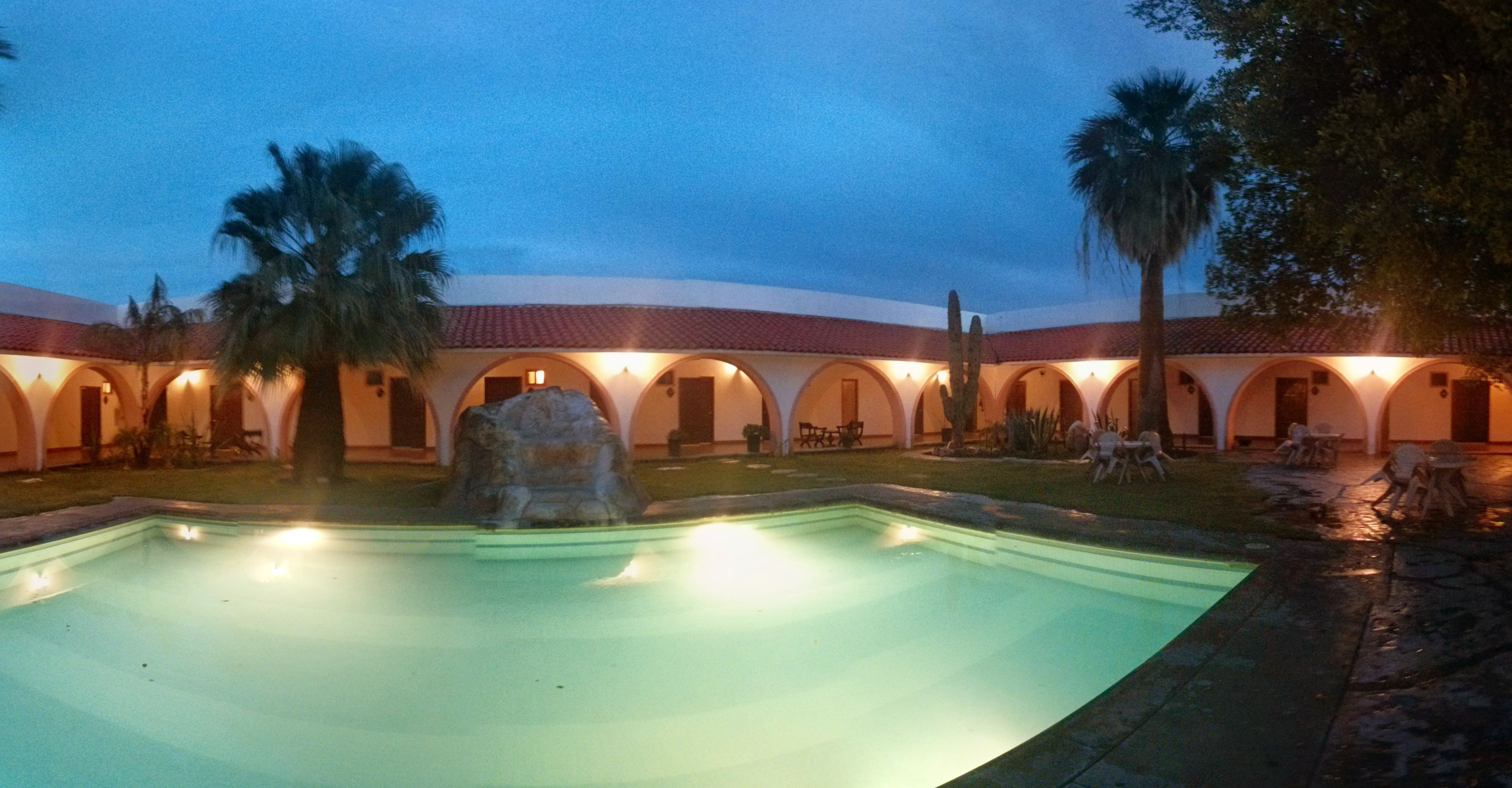
Hotel Misíon Santa María - Cataviña.

The local economy is dependent on tourism, ranching (Rancho Santa Inés, on the outskirts of the town, is an ejido held in common by the residents), and a couple of private vendors selling gasoline from 55 gallon barrels.

=== Tourism ===
Cataviña has a first-rate hotel developed by the National Fund for the Promotion of Tourism in the Mexican government. Nearby are some cave paintings and a field of giant rocks, mixed with desert vegetation, which make the area a place visited for lovers of ecotourism.

Those planning a trip that includes Cataviña, need to make sure to purchase enough fuel to get from El Rosario to Villa Jesús María, to avoid buying gasoline from the private vendor just mentioned (the Pemex station in Cataviña is closed, permanently.)

== Missions ==
- Misión San Fernando Rey de España de Velicatá
- Misión Santa María de los Ángeles
