= Basque Mexicans =

Basque Mexicans vasco-mexicanos euskal-mexikar
Total population
- 2,500,000 (by ancestry); 2% of the Mexican population

Regions with significant populations
- Mostly at Northern Mexico, especially Durango, Chihuahua, Sinaloa, Nuevo Leon, Coahuila.

Languages
- Spanish (Castilian Spanish, Mexican Spanish), Basque, French

Religion
- Roman Catholicism

Related ethnic groups
- Basques and Basque diaspora, Spanish Mexicans, French Mexicans

Basque Mexicans (Spanish: vasco-mexicanos or simply vasco, Euskara: euskal-mexikar) are Mexicans of full, partial, or predominantly Basque ancestry, or Basque-born persons living in Mexico.

Seen in Mexico by the whole Euskalerria concept, Basque descendants can be from Navarre, Euskadi or Iparralde.

== History ==
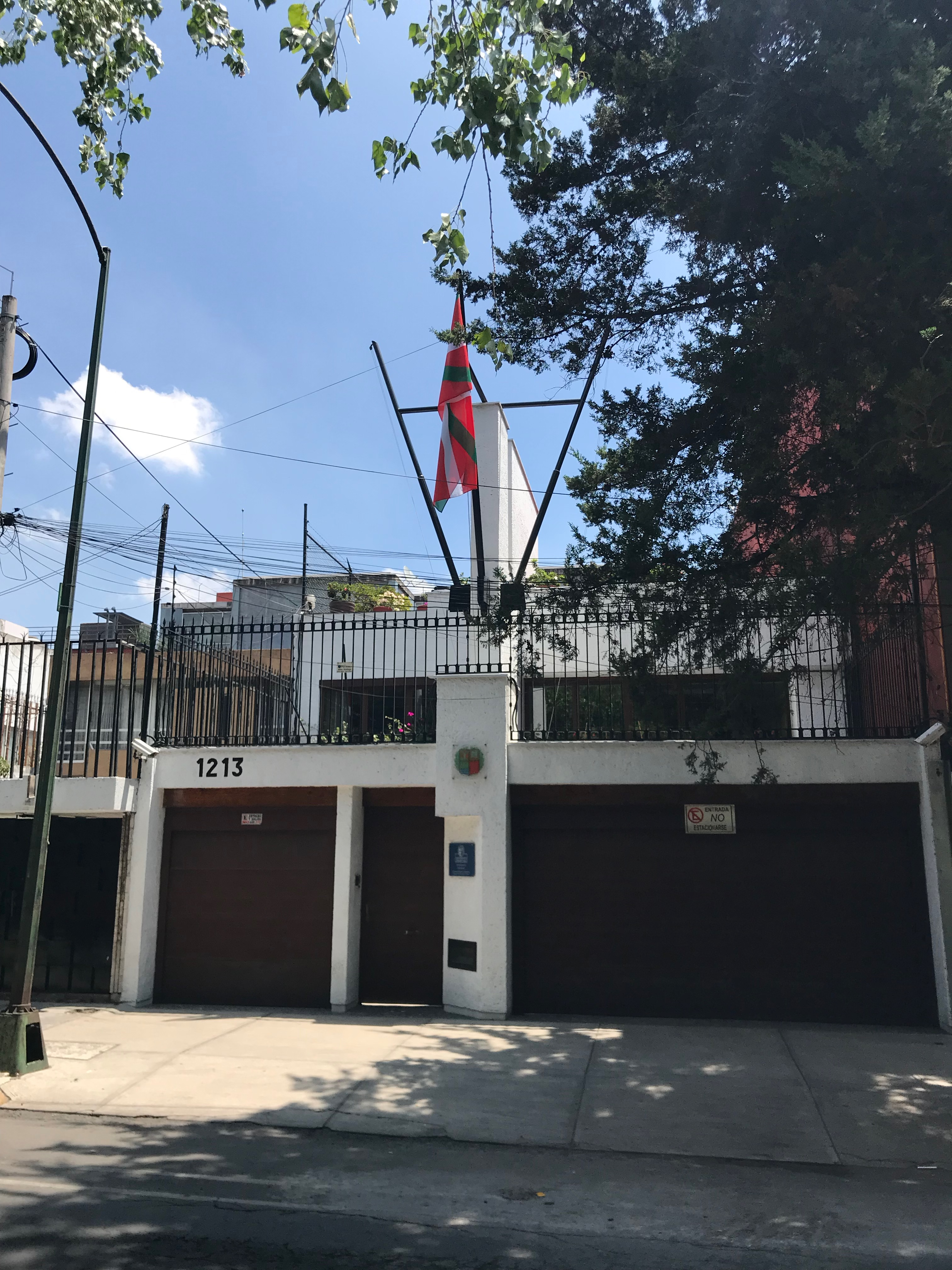
Delegation of the Basque Autonomous Community (Euskadi) in Mexico City

The first Catholic archbishop in Mexico, Juan Zumarraga, was Basque. Francisco Ibarra explored northern Mexico and founded Nueva Vizcaya. Fermín de Francisco Lasuén was the founder of many of the Spanish missions in Alta California.

In 1907, the Basque community founded the Centro Vasco. This community consisted of immigrants from Navarre, Gipuzkoa, Biscay and some French Basques. There was a divide between the Basque community: the first group were rural unskilled, economic emigrants that arrived in the late 19th and early 20th century and the other were political exiles of the Spanish Civil War that tended to have technical or academic education.

A notable migrant of the former group was Braulio Iriarte who immigrated to Mexico in 1877 with no education or professional experience. He began as an employee in a bakery and after years of hard work he owned 80 bakeries and a mill. This mill, El Euskaro, was founded in 1906; it was one of the largest in Mexico. He also owned haciendas in Querétaro, mines in Hidalgo, large properties in Mexico City and helped found various corporations, including Grupo Modelo.

== Notable Basque-Mexicans ==
- Javier Aguirre, Mexican former footballer and manager of Basque Origin.
- Sor Juana Inés de la Cruz, self-taught scholar and poet of the Baroque school, and nun of New Spain.
- Agustín de Iturbide, emperor of the First Mexican Empire.
- María Félix, Mexican actress of the Golden Age of Mexican cinema.
- Dolores del Río, Mexican film actress, Golden Age of Hollywood.
- Alejandro González Iñárritu, filmmaker, director of the highly acclaimed Birdman and The Revenant.
- Vicente Fox, 55th President of Mexico, of maternal Basque descent.
- Juan de Oñate, New Spanish explorer, colonial governor of the New Spain province of New Mexico.
- Enrique Gorostieta, Cristero Army general
- Francisco "Pancho" Villa, Mexican Revolutionary generals.
- Mariano Abasolo, Mexican revolutionist.
- Juan Escutia, Mexican soldier.
- José Alberto Aguilar Iñárritu, Mexican economist and politician
- Carlos Guerrero de Lizardi, Mexican professor and researcher in economics.
- Carlos María Abascal Carranza, Mexican lawyer and the Secretary of the Interior in the cabinet of Vicente Fox.
- Ignacio Elizondo, New Spanish royalist general of the Spanish army during the Mexican War of Independence.
- Clemente Aguirre, Mexican composer and music instructor.
- José Joaquín Fernández de Lizardi, Mexican writer and political journalist.
- Sergio Salvador Aguirre Anguiano, Mexican jurist and Associate Justice.
- Celso Aguirre Bernal, Mexican writer and historian.
- Ricardo Legorreta, Mexican architect.
- Luis Gatica, Mexican actor to Chilean father of Basque descent.
- Liza Echeverría, Mexican actress and model.
- Andrea Legarreta, Mexican actress and TV host.
- Ramón Músquiz, Mexican governor of Texas from 1830 to 1831 and in 1835.
- Ricardo Pozas Arciniega, Mexican anthropologist, scientific investigator and indigenista.
- Carlos Emilio Orrantía, Mexican footballer.
- Guillermo Iberio Ortiz Mayagoitia, Mexican jurist and Supreme Court Justice.
- Manuel Rueda Chapital, Mexican lawyer and his five sons and daughters, Maria Luisa, Patricia, Gabriela, Manuel Jr, and Mauricio
- Manuel Peláez, Mexican military officer.
- Hilda Gaxiola, Mexican female beach volleyball player.
- Venustiano Carranza, 44th President of Mexico from 1917 to 1920.
- Luis Echeverría, 50th President of Mexico from 1970 to 1976.
- Yuridia Francisca Gaxiola Flores, Mexican singer of Basque ancestry.
- Alberto Andrés Alvarado Arámburo, Mexican politician.
- Jorge Ibargüengoitia, Mexican novelist and playwright.
- Dolores Heredia, Mexican actress.
- Emilio Azcárraga Vidaurreta, Mexican businessman.
- Ángel César Mendoza Arámburo, Mexican politician.
- Mariana Ochoa, Mexican singer
- María Asunción Aramburuzabala, Mexican billionaire businesswoman.
- Susana Zabaleta, Mexican actress and singer
- DJ Trevi, DJ, producer, composer, and actor
- Ángel César Mendoza Arámburo, Mexican politician.
- Guillermo Ochoa, Mexican footballer.
- Silvia Navarro, Mexican Actress
