= Mexican Federal Highway 1 =

Highway in Mexico

Federal Highway 1
- Carretera federal 1
- Benito Juarez Transpeninsular Highway; Carretera Transpeninsular Benito Juarez

Route information
- Maintained by Secretariat of Infrastructure, Communications and Transportation
- Length: 1,711 km (1,063 mi)

Major junctions
- North end: I-5 at the U.S. border in Tijuana
- Fed. 1D in Tijuana; Fed. 1D in Rosarito Beach; Fed. 1D in La Misión; Fed. 3 in El Sauzal; Fed. 3 in Ensenada; Fed. 5 in Chapala; Fed. 12 in Punta Prieta; Fed. 22 in Ciudad Constitución; Fed. 11 in La Paz; Fed. 19 in San Pedro
- South end: Fed. 19 in Cabo San Lucas

Location
- Country: Mexico
- States: Baja California, Baja California Sur

Highway system
- Mexican Federal Highways; List; Autopistas
← Fed. 307	→ Fed. 1D

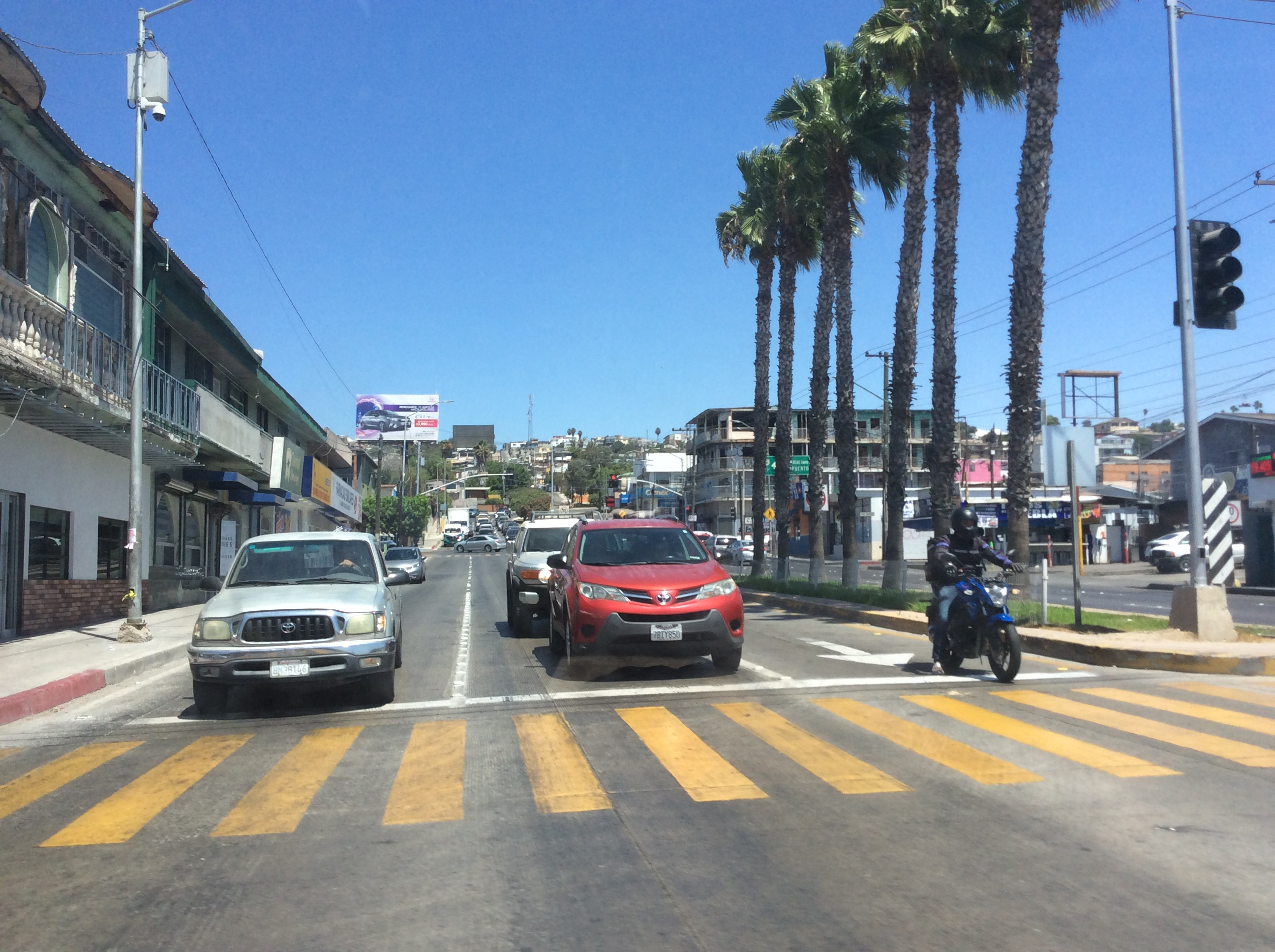
The Av. Aquiles Serdan/Fed. 1 intersection

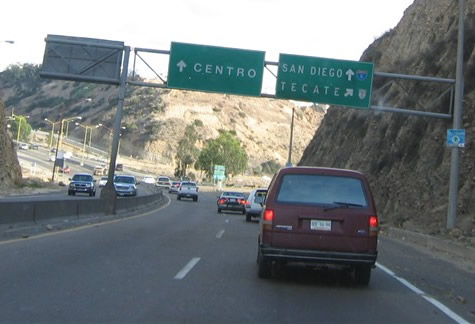
A sign on the Fed. 1 displaying how to get to San Diego (2007)

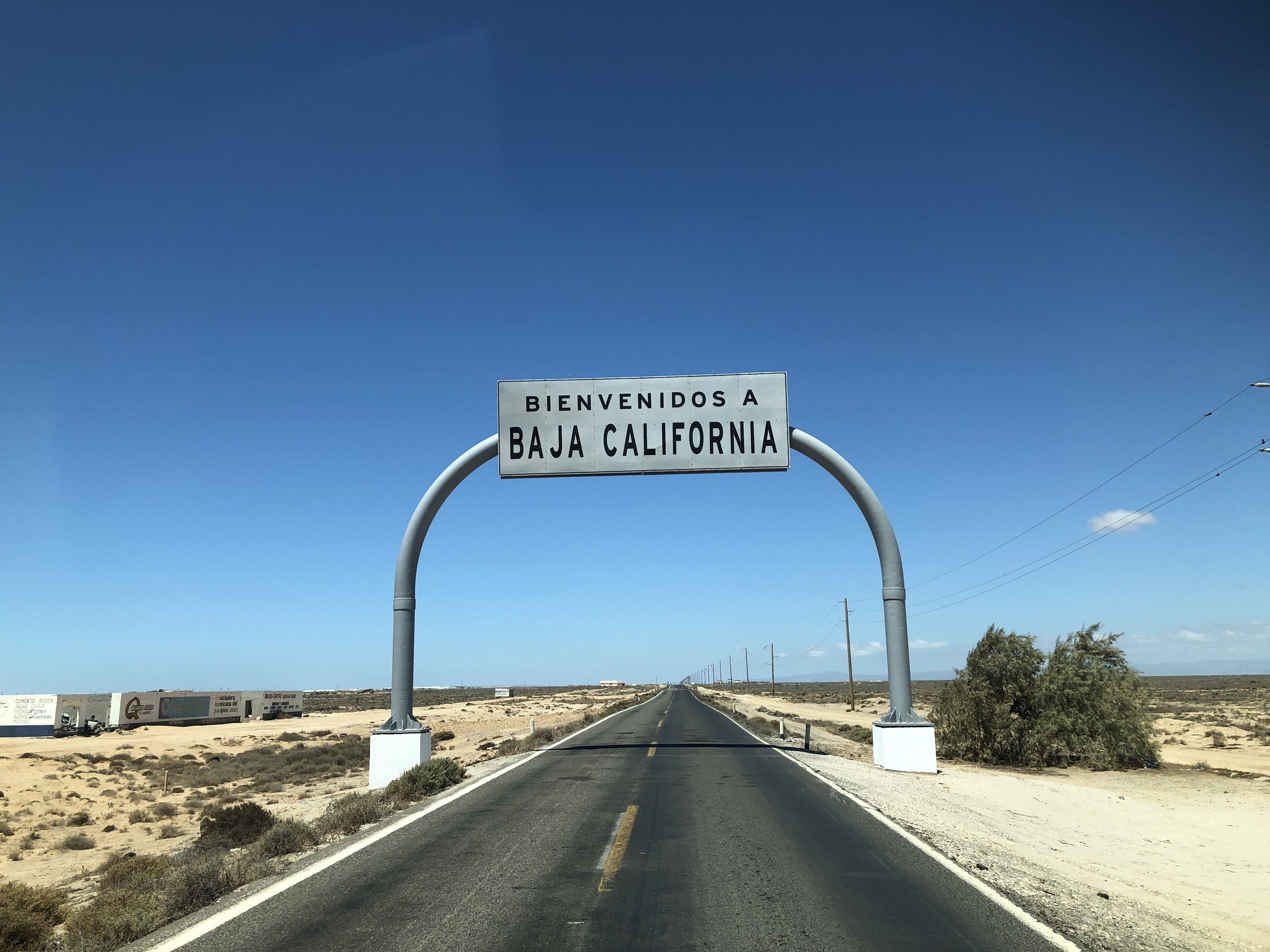
"Bienvenidos a Baja California" state entrance road sign

Federal Highway 1 (Spanish: Carretera Federal 1, Fed. 1) is a toll-free (libre) part of the federal highway corridors (los corredores carreteros federales) of Mexico, and the highway follows the length of the Baja California Peninsula from Tijuana, Baja California, in the north to Cabo San Lucas, Baja California Sur, in the south. The road connects with Via Rapida, which merges into the American Interstate 5 (I-5) at the San Ysidro Port of Entry, which crosses the international border south of San Ysidro, California.

Fed. 1 is often called the Carretera Transpeninsular (Transpeninsular Highway) and runs a length of 1,711 kilometres (1,063 mi) from Tijuana to Cabo San Lucas. Most of its course, particularly south of Ensenada, is as a two-lane rural highway. Completed in 1973, Fed. 1's official name is the Benito Juárez Transpeninsular Highway (Carretera Transpeninsular Benito Juarez), named in honor of Mexico's president during the country's 1860s invasion by France.

== Route description ==
Federal highway corridors in Mexico are generally designated with even numbers for east–west routes and odd numbers for north–south routes. Numerical designations usually ascend southward away from the U.S. border for east–west routes and usually ascend eastward away from the Pacific Ocean for north–south routes. Therefore, Fed. 1, due to its proximity to the Pacific Ocean, has the lowest possible odd number designation, and intersecting east–west federal highway corridors usually conform to this pattern.

The road begins in the border city of Tijuana, where it continues northward as Interstate 5 at the San Ysidro Port of Entry. This highway also goes under the Cross Border Xpress terminal in Tijuana. It is bypassed from here to Ensenada by Fed. 1D, a toll road. Then, the road continues south past Maneadero. Much of it follows or passes near the route of Portola's march from Loreto to San Diego during the establishment of the Spanish missions in Baja California.

Kilometer markers track the distance along Fed. 1 through Baja California in four separate improved segments. The first of these is the 109-kilometre (68 mi) length from Tijuana to Ensenada, which is known informally as Mex 1 Libre to distinguish it from Fed. 1D, the parallel toll road. The second portion of signed road runs 196 kilometres (122 mi) from Ensenada to San Quintín. The third segment comprises 128 kilometres (80 mi) from San Quintín to the Parador Punta Prieta junction. A final segment stretches 128 kilometres (80 mi) from Punta Prieta to the border of the state of Baja California Sur near Guerrero Negro. The total route of Fed. 1 in Baja California is 713 km (443 mi).

Continuing south into the two Mexican states that comprise the Baja California peninsula, Guerrero Negro is the nearest community to the point where Fed. 1 meets the 28th parallel north. Afterward Fed. 1 leaves the western coast and crosses to the eastern coast at Santa Rosalía. The route continues southward past Puerto Escondido and gains altitude at Sierra de la Giganta, then veers southwest and through agricultural lands and Ciudad Constitución. After crossing a desert the route encounters La Paz on the eastern coast. The route continues along the gulf side of the peninsula through San José del Cabo to its terminus at Cabo San Lucas.

After crossing state lines the kilometer markers progress in the opposite direction. Baja California signage count from north to south, but Baja California Sur signage count from south to north. So in opposite order from the road signage, a progressive route southward would span 221 kilometres (137 mi) from Guerrero Negro to Santa Rosalía, 197 kilometres (122 mi) from Santa Rosalía to Loreto, 120 kilometres (75 mi) from Loreto to Ciudad Insurgentes, 240 kilometres (150 mi) from Ciudad Insurgentes to La Paz, and 224 kilometres (139 mi) from La Paz to Cabo San Lucas.

== Major intersections ==
=== Baja California ===
- 32°32′34.09″N 117°01′47.57″W United States–Mexico border (Tijuana)
- 32°22′18.57″N 117°03′36.24″W Playas de Rosarito
- 31°52′12.01″N 116°37′12.00″W Ensenada
- 31.7155°N 116.5700°W Maneadero
- 30°31′26.78″N 115°55′51.78″W San Quintín
- 30°03′13.01″N 115°44′08.72″W El Rosario
- 29°43′42.71″N 114°43′06.83″W Cataviña
- 29°02′43.12″N 114°09′10.24″W Fed. 12 to Bahía de los Ángeles
- 28°55′43.08″N 114°09′24.96″W Punta Prieta
- 28°38′19.04″N 114°01′16.34″W Rosarito
- 28°16′51.93″N 113°59′58.58″W Villa Jesús María and road to Sebastián Vizcaíno Bay
- 28°00′00.00″N 114°00′43.88″W State Line (28th parallel north)

=== Baja California Sur ===
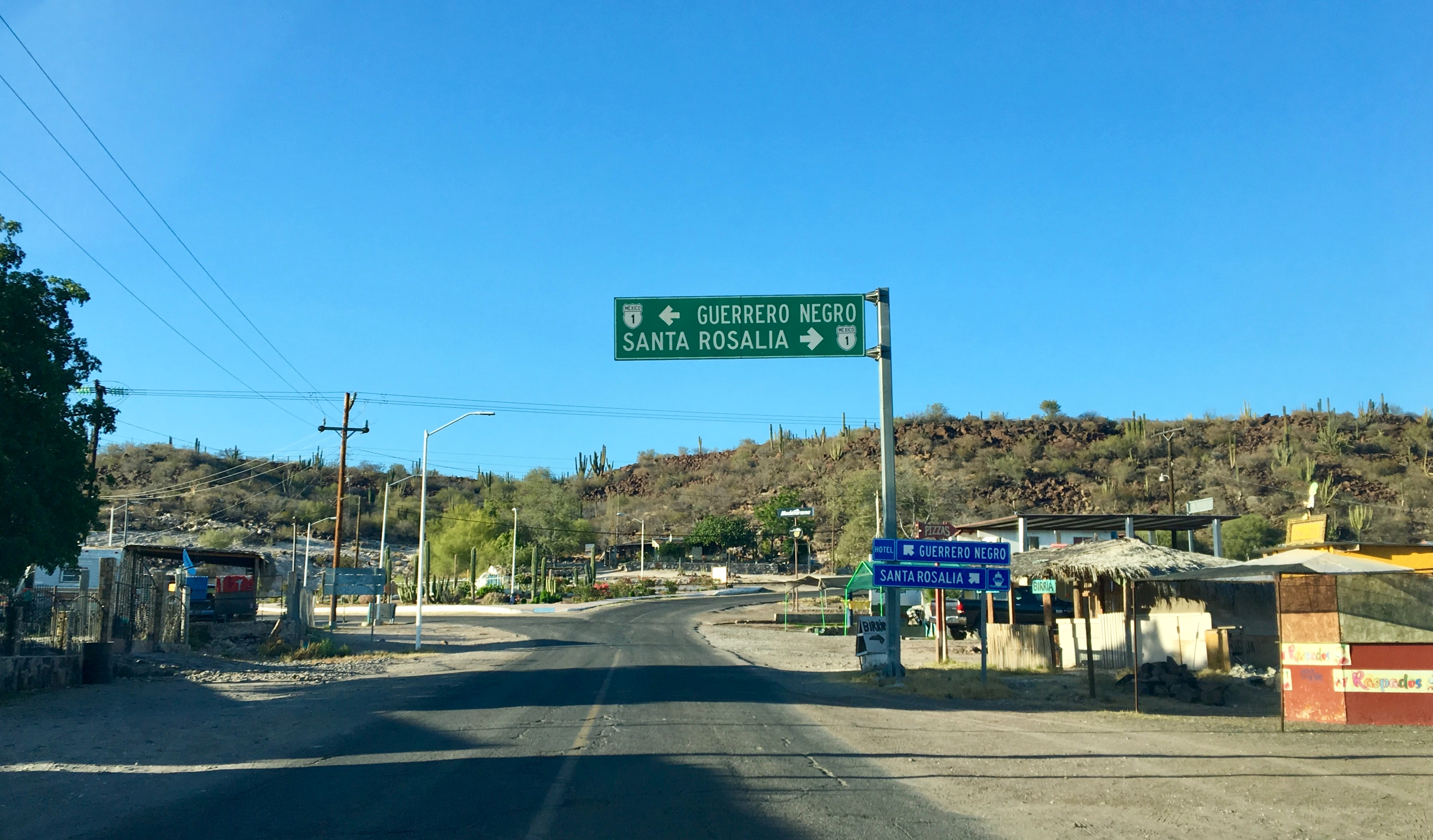
Mexican Federal Highway 1 Junction in San Ignacio, Baja California Sur.

- 27°58′02.14″N 114°00′51.85″W Guerrero Negro
- 27°18′05.50″N 112°52′44.30″W San Ignacio, road to San Ignacio Lagoon
- 27°20′04.64″N 112°15′55.38″W Santa Rosalía
- 26°53′33.27″N 111°58′38.71″W Mulegé
- 26°00′27.09″N 111°21′02.07″W Loreto
- 25°15′13.98″N 111°46′31.60″W Ciudad Insurgentes
- 25°01′30.66″N 111°40′11.23″W Ciudad Constitución
- 24°08′26.60″N 110°18′42.46″W La Paz
- 23°55′28.89″N 110°15′53.21″W San Pedro
- 23°53′57.76″N 110°15′29.31″W Fed. 19 to Todos Santos & El Pescadero; shortcut to Cabo San Lucas
- 23°48′33.82″N 110°03′26.66″W San Antonio
- 23°32′30.37″N 109°40′40.49″W Santiago
- 23°09′21.30″N 109°42′29.64″W Los Cabos International Airport (at airport exit)
- 23°02′40.35″N 109°42′21.06″W San José del Cabo - as Boulevard Mauricio Castro
- 22°57′54.44″N 109°47′55.31″W Los Cabos Corridor (at transpeninsular monument)
- 22°52′58.15″N 109°54′52.77″W Cabo San Lucas - as Boulevard Lázaro Cárdenas
