= San Pedro, Baja California Sur =

Town in Mexico

Coordinates: 23°55′39″N 110°15′52″W

San Pedro is a small town in the Sierra de la Laguna Mountains in La Paz Municipality near the southern end of Baja California Sur. It is located a few miles north of the junction of Highway 1 and Highway 19. It had a 2010 census population of 568 inhabitants, and is situated at an elevation of 200 meters (656 ft.) above sea level.

Both of these roads eventually lead to Cabo San Lucas, but Highway 19 goes by way of Todos Santos and then down Pacific coast. Highway 1 goes down the Gulf of California side to San José del Cabo.

It is near the center of the Baja California Peninsula, equally distant from the Pacific Ocean and the Gulf of California.
