= Félix Agramont Cota =

Mexican politician

Governor of Baja California Sur
- In office October 8, 1974 – April 6, 1975
- Preceded by: Office created
- Succeeded by: Angel César Mendoza Arámburo

Governor of the South Territory of Baja California
- In office 1970 – October 8, 1974
- Preceded by: Hugo Cervantes del Río
- Succeeded by: Office abolished with statehood

Personal details
- Born: November 17, 1918 El Pescadero, Baja California Sur
- Died: May 10, 2013 (aged 94) La Paz, Baja California Sur
- Party: Institutional Revolutionary Party
- Occupation: Agricultural engineer politician

Félix Agramont Cota (November 17, 1918 – May 10, 2013) was a Mexican politician, agricultural engineer, and member of the Institutional Revolutionary Party (PRI). Agramont oversaw the creation of Baja California Sur (BCS) as the 31st Mexican state in October 1974. Agramont served as the last Governor of the South Territory of Baja California from 1970 until the creation of the new state on October 8, 1974. He was then appointed as the first Governor of Baja California Sur, serving from October 8, 1974, until April 6, 1975.

Agramont was the first civilian governor of Baja California Sur who was born in the present-day state. He was the also the last Governor of Baja California Sur to be appointed to date. His successors have since been elected to office.

== Biography ==
=== Early life and career ===
Agramont was born on November 17, 1918, in El Pescadero, present-day Baja California Sur. He was a native of Todos los Santos, Baja California Sur.

He attended the Escuela Normal de San Ignacio and graduated from Chapingo Autonomous University. Agramont became an agricultural engineer and served as the national director of Productora Nacional de Semillas (PRONASE).

=== Governor of Baja California Sur ===
Agramont was appointed Governor of the former South Territory of Baja California by President Luis Echeverría Álvarez in 1970. He was the first civilian governor to have been born in Baja California Sur. He oversaw the transition from a territory into a full Mexican federal state. For example, the building which now houses the Baja California Sur state legislature was constructed during his tenure.

He remained Governor of the territory until October 8, 1974, when Mexican President Luis Echeverría issued a decree creating the new state of Baja California Sur. (The same decree simultaneously created the state of Quintana Roo as well).

The Senate of the Republic appointed Agramont as the first, provisional Governor of Baja California Sur. He took office on October 8, 1974, the same day of BCS's creation. He oversaw the creation of the Constitution of Baja California Sur and the state Tribunal Superior de Justicia. The Constitución del Estado de Baja California Sur was adopted on January 9, 1975.

Agramont served as the first BCS Governor until April 6, 1975, when Angel César Mendoza Arámburo succeeded him as the state's first elected governor.

Félix Agramont Cota died from acute myocardial infarction on May 10, 2013, in La Paz, Baja California Sur, at the age of 95. He was survived by two children, and several grandchildren including Ricardo Barroso Agramont. Ricardo Barroso Agramont ran for governor in the February 2011 gubernatorial election, but was defeated by Marcos Covarrubias Villaseñor.

Preceded by Hugo Cervantes del Río	Governor of the South Territory of state of Baja California; 1970—1974	Succeeded by Office abolished
Preceded by Office created	Governor of state of Baja California Sur; 1974–1975	Succeeded by Ángel César Mendoza Arámburo
