= Camalú =

Camalú, Baja California
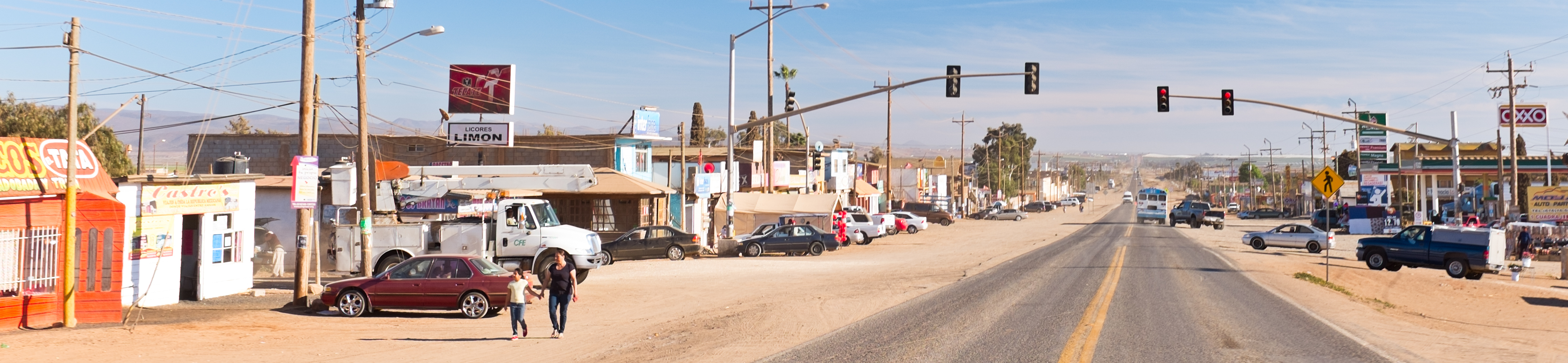

- Location in Mexico
- Coordinates: 30°50′16″N 116°03′26″W
- Country: Mexico
- State: Baja California
- Municipality: San Quintín
- Elevation: 69 ft (21 m)

Population (2010)
  - City: 8,621
  - Urban: 8,621
- Time zone: UTC-8 (Northwest US Pacific)
  - Summer (DST): UTC-7 (Northwest)

Camalú is a town in San Quintín Municipality, Baja California, located on the Pacific Coast of Mexico. The census of 2010 reported a population of 8,621 inhabitants, up from 6,333 in 2000.

== Geography ==
The main town is on Federal Highway 1, 175 km south of Tijuana. Drive time is about 2 hours south of Ensenada, some 30 km past Colonet town. For about 60 km (37 mi), from Colonet to El Rosario you can see the ocean from the highway.

Though its considerably south of San Diego, water temperatures range from lows nearing 10°C(50°F) to highs approaching 21°C(70°F). 3mm/2mm wetsuits are recommended for surfing on all but the warmest of days.

== Tourism ==
Tourism is important to the local economy, particularly nature and activities tourism, such as surfing, dune racing, and fishing.
