= UACH =

UACH may refer to:

- Austral University of Chile, Chilean research university
- Autonomous University of Chihuahua, Mexican public university
- Chapingo Autonomous University, Mexican agricultural college
