= Punta Prieta =

Punta Prieta may refer to:

- Punta Prieta, Baja California, a desert town in the Mexican state of Baja California
- Punta Prieta, Baja California Sur, a small town on the west coast of the Mexican state of Baja California Sur
