= Mexican Federal Highway 11 =

Highway in Mexico

Federal Highway 11
- Carretera federal 11

Route information
- Maintained by Secretariat of Infrastructure, Communications and Transportation
- Length: 18.00 km (11.18 mi)

Major junctions
- North end: Pichilingue, Baja California Sur
- South end: Fed. 1 at La Paz, Baja California Sur

Location
- Country: Mexico
- State: Baja California Sur

Highway system
- Mexican Federal Highways; List; Autopistas
← Fed. 10	→ Fed. 12

Federal Highway 11 (Spanish: Carretera Federal 11, Fed. 11 ) is a toll-free part of the federal highway corridors (Spanish: los corredores carreteros federales). Fed. 11 runs from Fed. 1 in La Paz, Baja California Sur to Pichilingue (the port of La Paz), a total length of 18 km (11.18 mi).
