= Punta Prieta Airstrip =

- IATA: none; ICAO: none

Summary
- Airport type: Public
- Location: Punta Prieta
- Elevation AMSL: 656 ft / 200 m
- Coordinates: 28°55′17″N 114°09′05″W
- Interactive map of Punta Prieta Airstrip

Runways
Direction	Length		Surface
Direction	ft	m	Surface
18/36	4,906	1,495	Asphalt

Punta Prieta Airstrip is a public paved airstrip located South of Punta Prieta, Municipality of Ensenada, Baja California, Mexico, a small town located just in the middle of The Valle de los Cirios Protected Natural Area, beside the Federal Highway 1. The runway runs north–south, parallel to the highway. The airfield is used solely for general aviation purposes.
