= San Quintín Municipality =

Municipality in the Mexican state of Baja California

San Quintín Municipality Municipio de San Quintín
- Municipality
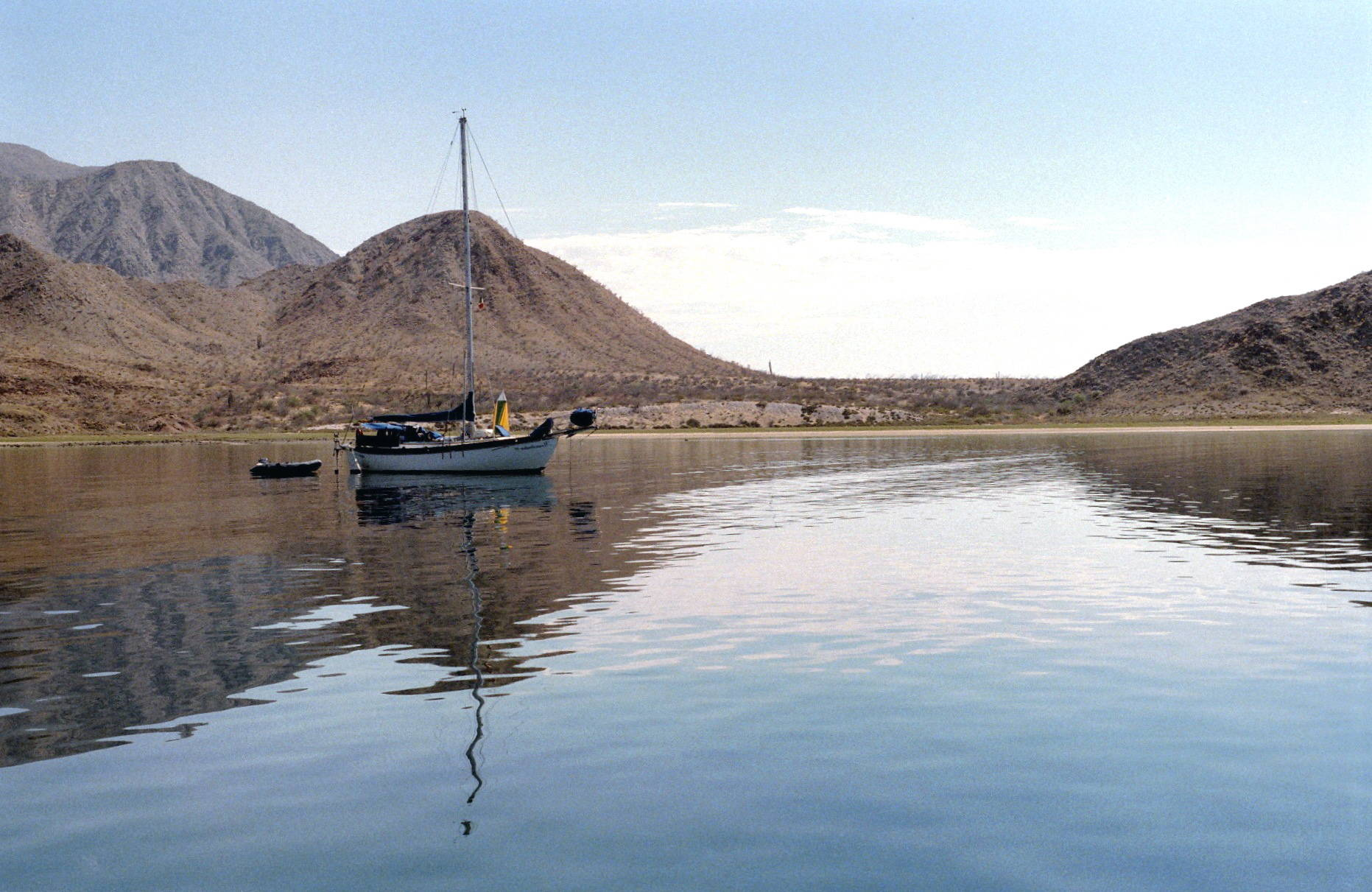
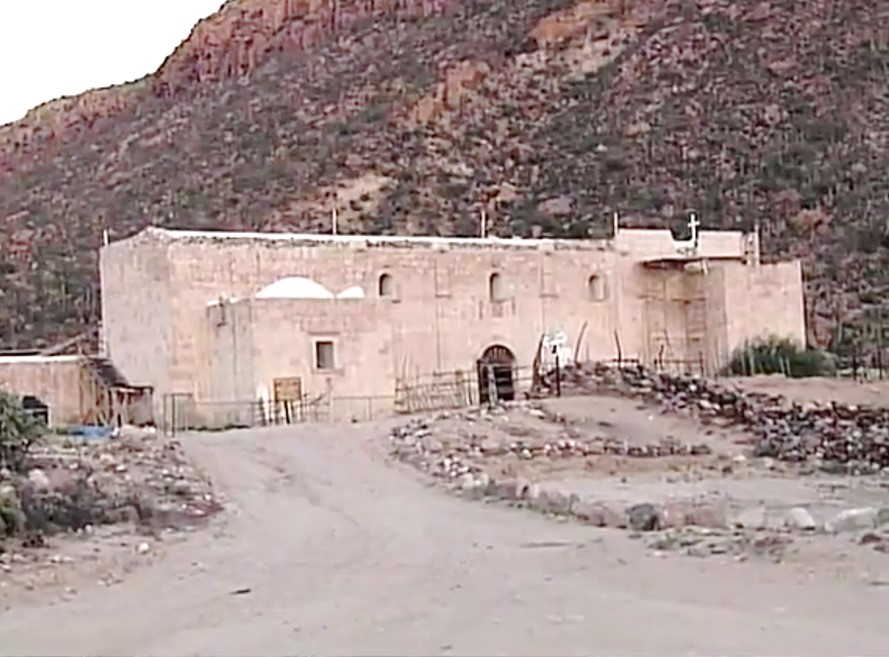
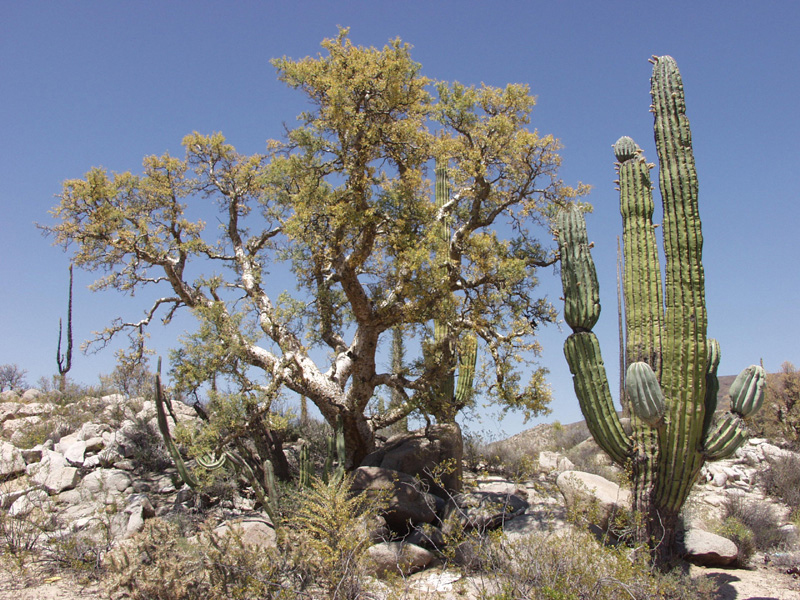
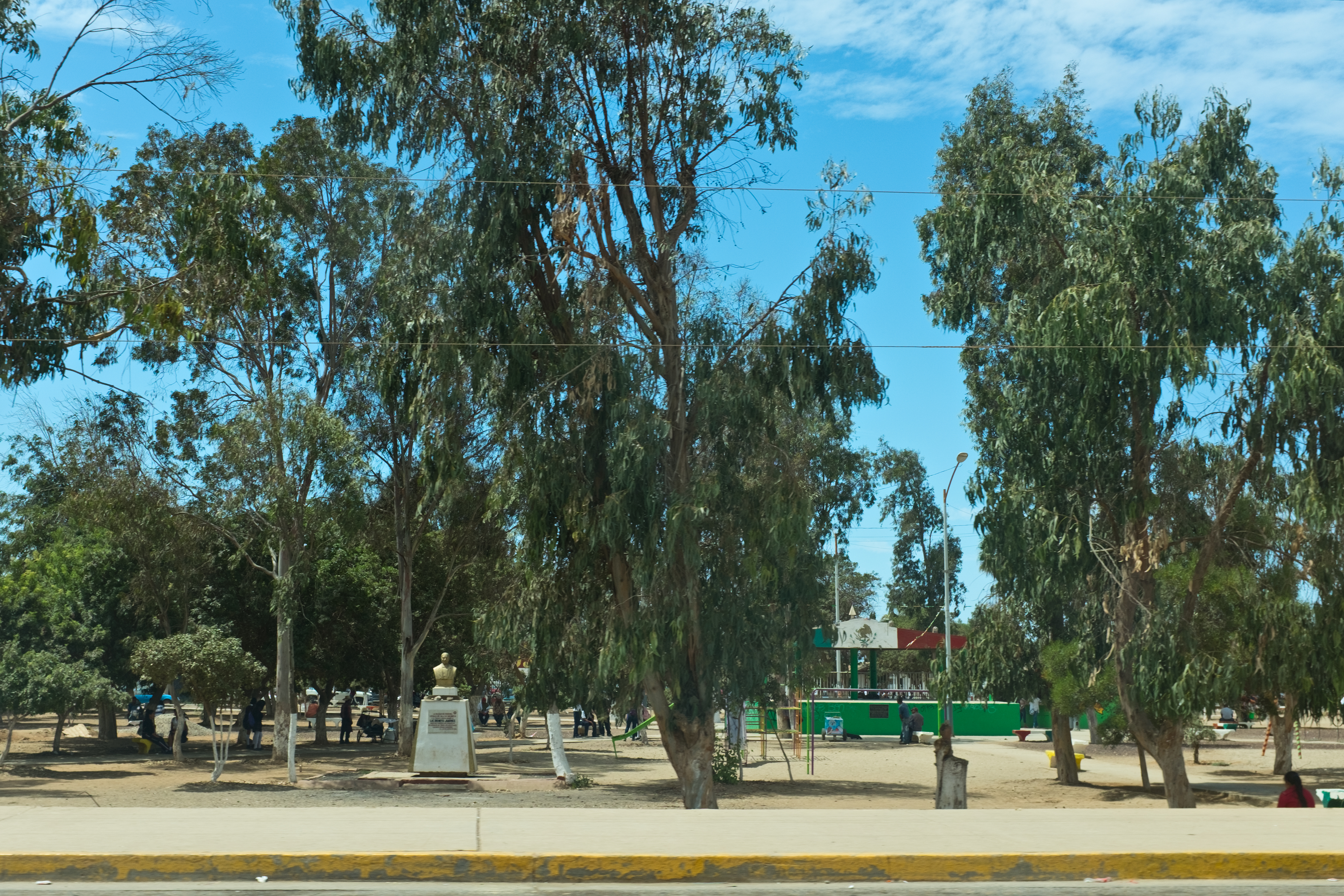
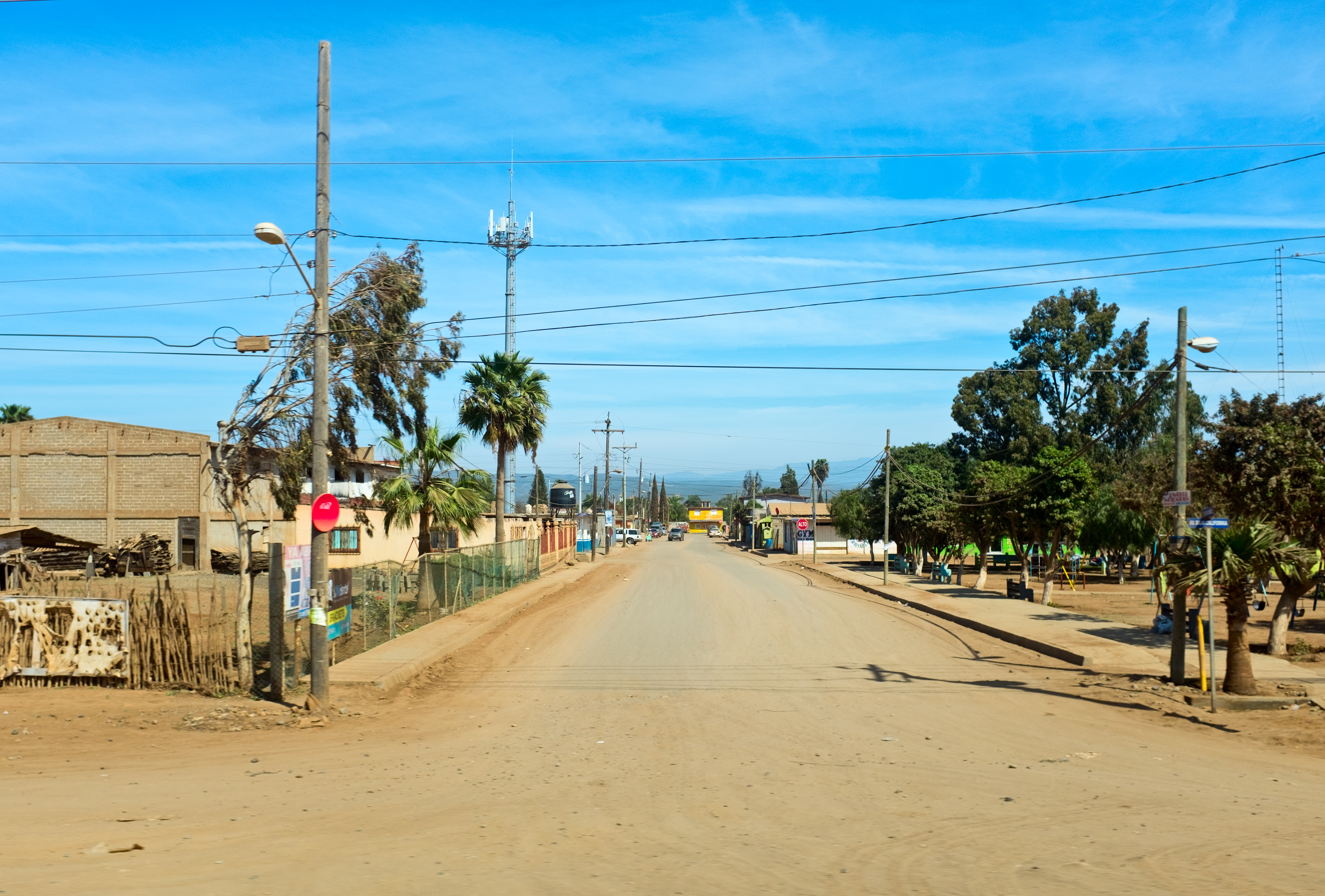
- Top: Bahía de los Ángeles; Middle: Mission San Francisco Borja, Cataviña Landscape; Bottom: Lázaro Cárdenas Town, Camalú town

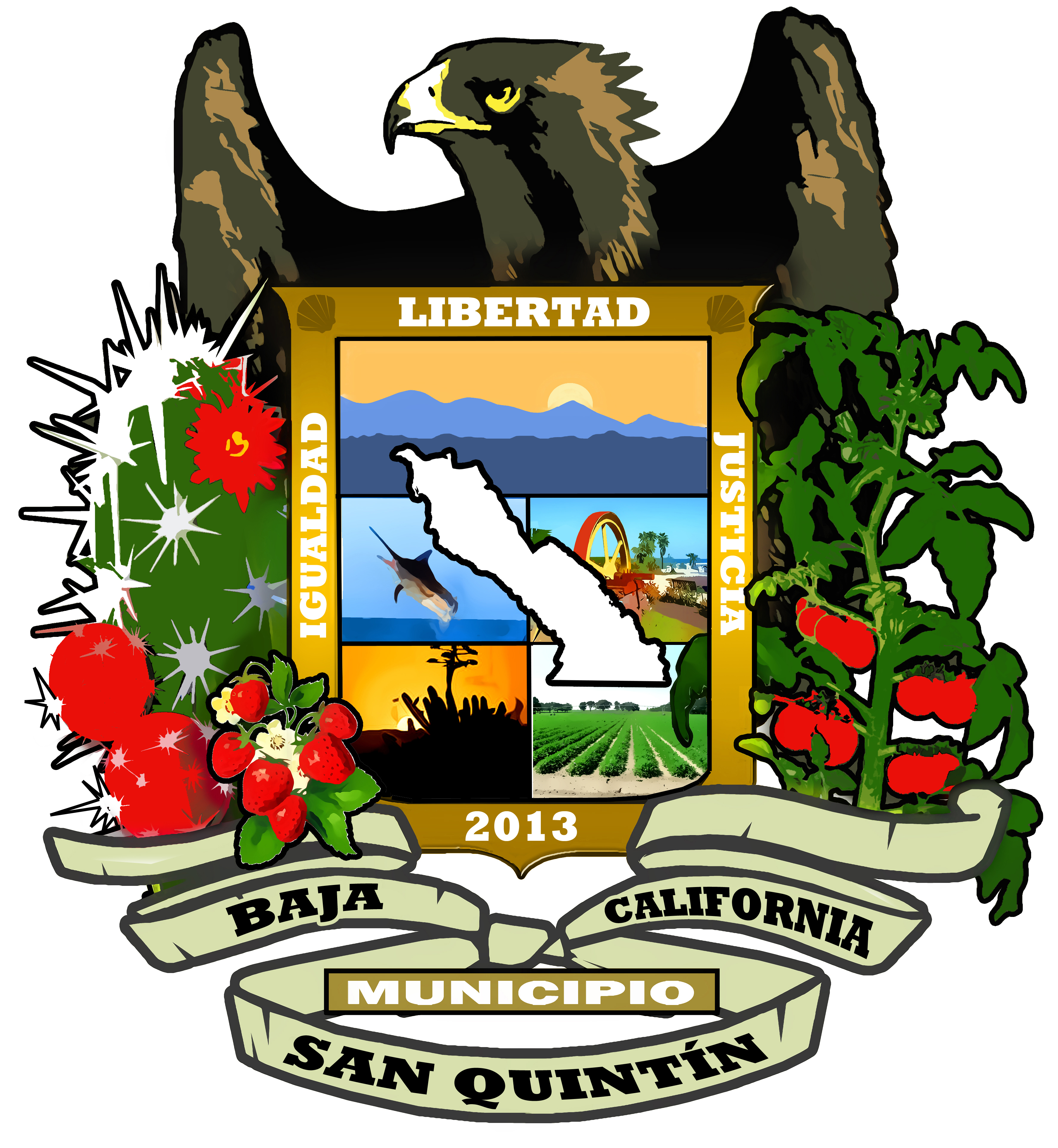
- Coat of arms
- Motto: '
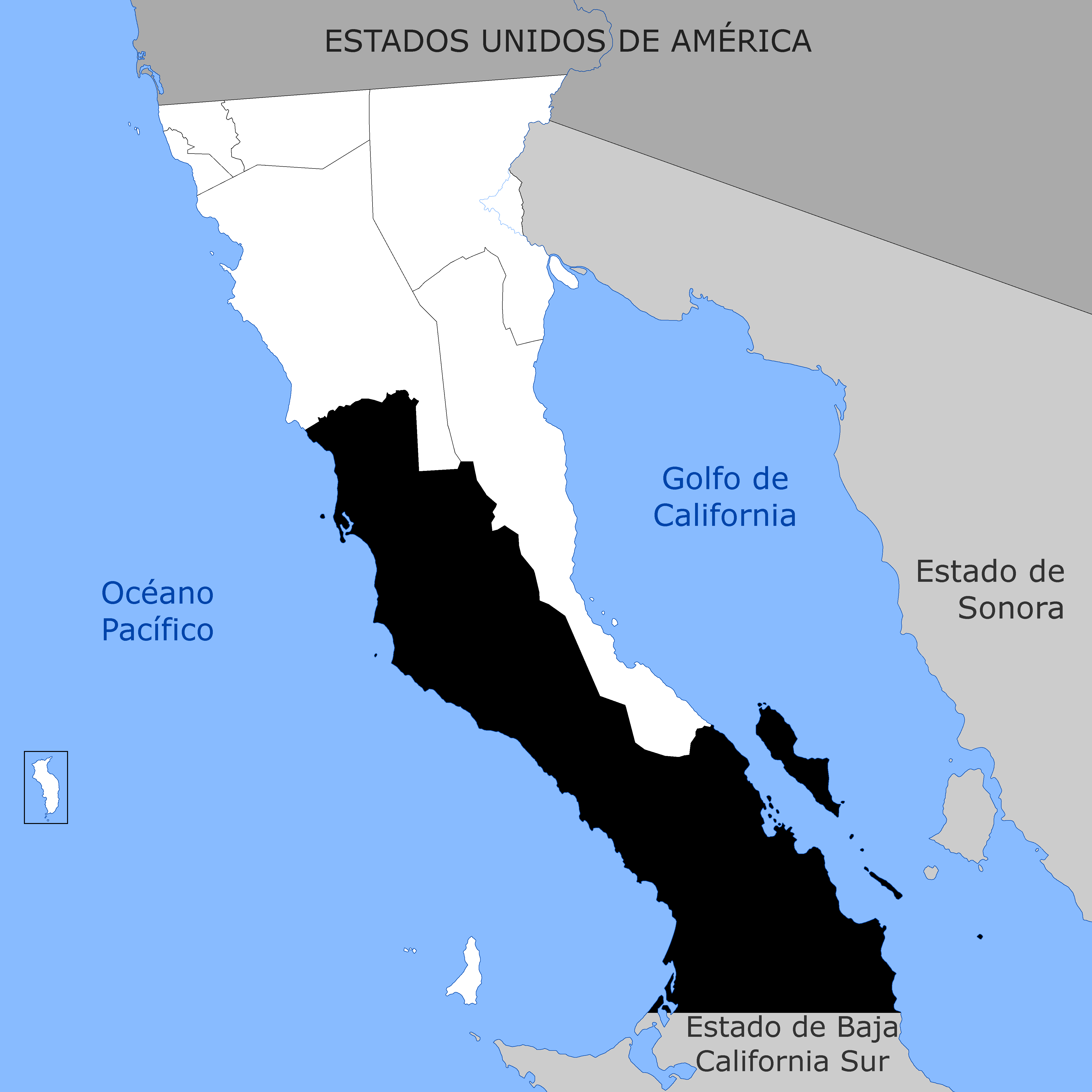
- Location of San Quintín in Baja California prior to the creation of San Felipe.
- Coordinates: 32°34′N 116°38′W
- Country: Mexico
- State: Baja California
- Founded: 27 February 2020
- Seat: San Quintín
- Largest city: San Quintín

Area
  - Total: 32,883.93 km^{2} (12,696.56 sq mi)

Population (2020)
  - Total: 117,568
  - Density: 3.57524/km^{2} (9.25983/sq mi)
- Data source:
- Time zone: UTC−08:00 (Zona Noroeste)
  - Summer (DST): UTC−07:00 (DST)
- Area code: +52 616
- INEGI code: 006

San Quintín is a municipality in the Mexican state of Baja California. Its municipal seat is located in the city of San Quintín, Baja California. According to the 2020 census, it had a population of 117,568 inhabitants. The municipality has an area of 32,883.93 km^{2} (12,696.56 sq mi), the most extensive in the country. There are a few National Parks and a World Heritage Site at Bahia de Los Angeles.

== History ==
On 27 February 2020 San Quintin separated from the municipality of Ensenada, and became Baja California's sixth municipality.

== Administrative divisions ==
Historical population
Year	Pop.	±%
2020	117,568	—

The municipality is divided into 8 delegations:

1. Camalú
2. Vicente Guerrero
3. San Quintín
4. El Rosario
5. El Mármol
6. Punta Prieta
7. Bahía de los Ángeles
8. Villa Jesús María.

=== Localities ===
The municipality is made up of many localities. Its urban localities in 2010 were:

- Lázaro Cárdenas (16,294)
- Vicente Guerrero (11,455)
- Camalú (8,621)
- Emiliano Zapata (5,756)
- San Quintín (4,777)
- Colonia Lomas de San Ramón (Triquis) (3,805)
- Ejido Papalote (3,413)
- Colonia Nueva Era (3,256)
- Colonia Santa Fe (2,632)
