= Mexican Federal Highway 19 =

Highway in Mexico

Federal Highway 19
- Carretera federal 19

Route information
- Maintained by Secretariat of Infrastructure, Communications and Transportation
- Length: 131.00 km (81.40 mi)

Major junctions
- North end: Fed. 1 near San Pedro, Baja California Sur
- South end: Fed. 1 in Cabo San Lucas, Baja California Sur

Location
- Country: Mexico
- State: Baja California Sur

Highway system
- Mexican Federal Highways; List; Autopistas
← Fed. 18	→ Fed. 20

Federal Highway 19 (Spanish: Carretera Federal 19, Fed. 19) is a toll-free part of the federal highways corridors (Spanish: los corredores carreteros federales) and runs along the Pacific coast of Baja California Peninsula from Cabo San Lucas up to Todos Santos where it turns inland and eventually joins Fed. 1 a few miles south of San Pedro, Baja California Sur. The route runs entirely within the state of Baja California Sur, with both its North and South termini meeting at Mexican Federal Highway 1.

Road distance-markers (indicating the distance in kilometers from north to south) are generally placed at the roadside each 5 km, and occasionally at more frequent intervals.

== Towns and landmarks ==
- San Pedro
- Todos Santos
- El Pescadero
- Playa Migriño
- Cabo San Lucas

== Major intersections ==
The entire route is in Baja California Sur.

Municipality	Location	km	mi	Destinations	Notes
Los Cabos	Cabo San Lucas			Fed. 1 north – San José del Cabo	Southern terminus
Los Cabos	Cabo San Lucas			Fed. 1D north – San José del Cabo	Interchange
Los Cabos				San José del Cabo	Interchange
La Paz				Fed. 19D north – La Paz	Interchange
La Paz	Todos Santos			Fed. 19D south – Cabo San Lucas	Interchange
La Paz				Fed. 1 – Cabo San Lucas, La Paz	Interchange; northern terminus
1.000 mi = 1.609 km; 1.000 km = 0.621 mi
