= Lázaro Cárdenas, Baja California =

- City
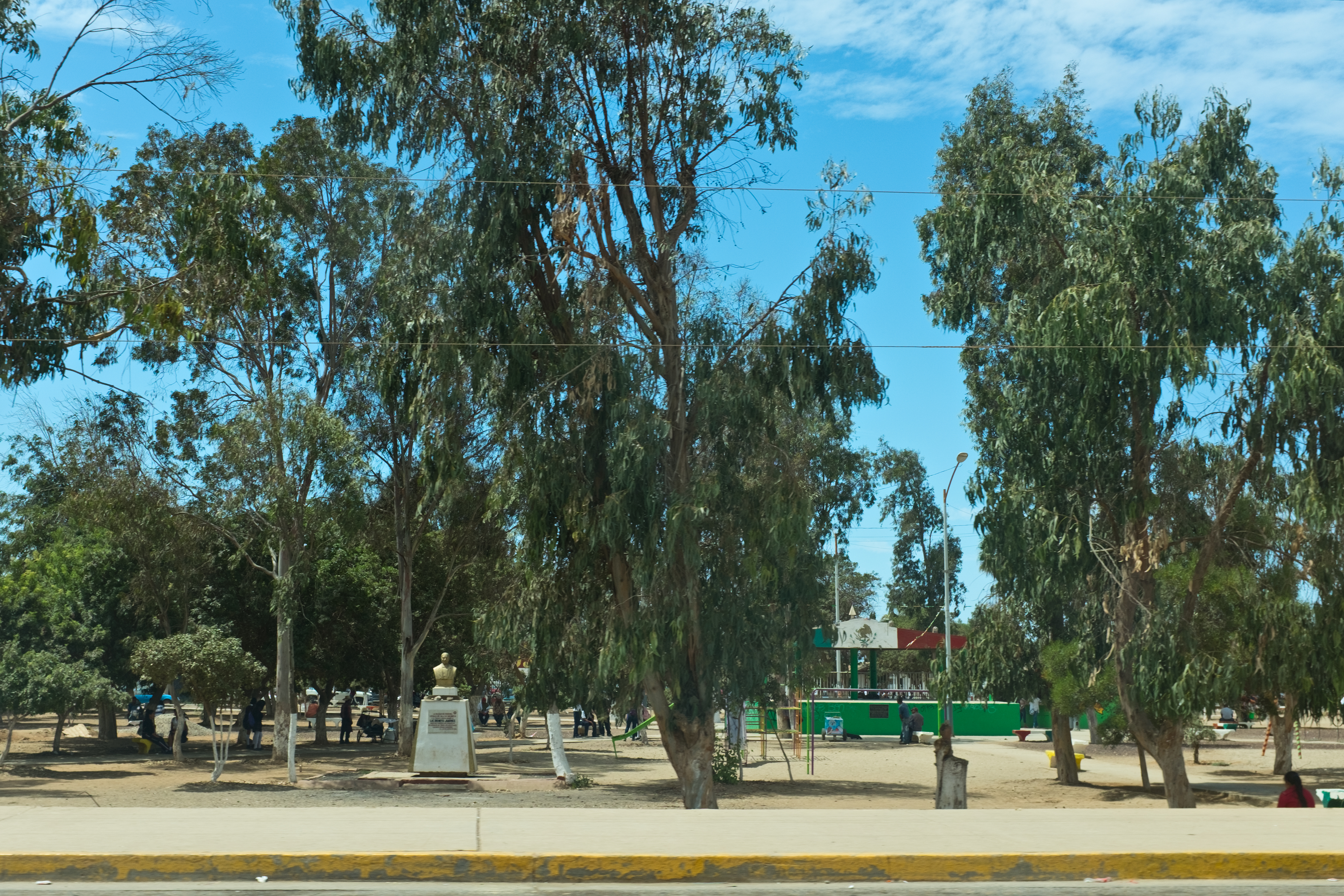
- Parque Central de Lázaro Cárdenas

- Location in Mexico
- Coordinates: 30°33′37″N 115°56′33″W
- Country: Mexico
- State: Baja California
- Municipality: San Quintín
- Elevation: 92 ft (28 m)

Population (2010)
  - Total: 16,294
- Time zone: UTC-8 (Northwest US Pacific)
  - Summer (DST): UTC-7 (Northwest)

Lázaro Cárdenas is a city in San Quintín Municipality, Baja California, located on the Pacific Coast of Mexico. With a population of 16,294 and is the largest population center in the entire municipality, far surpassing the population of the locality of San Quintín itself (with a population of about 5,000).
