= Mexican Federal Highway 1D =

Toll highways in Mexico

Federal Highway 1D
- Carretera federal 1D

Route information
- Maintained by Secretariat of Communications and Transportation

Segunda Benito Juárez Autopista Tijuana-Ensenada
- Length: 98.15 km (60.99 mi)
- North end: I-5 in San Diego
- Major intersections: Fed. 1 in Tijuana; Fed. 1 in Rosarito Beach
- South end: Fed. 1 in Ensenada

Autopista Aeropuerto Los Cabos - San José del Cabo - Cabo San Lucas
- South end: Fed. 1 east of the Aeropuerto Los Cabos
- Major intersections: Access to Aeropuerto Internacional de Los Cabos; Spur to San José del Cabo
- To: Fed. 1 at Cabo San Lucas

Location
- Country: Mexico
- State: Baja California

Highway system
- Mexican Federal Highways; List; Autopistas
← Fed. 1	→ Fed. 2

Federal Highway 1D (Spanish: Carretera Federal 1D, Fed. 1D) is a tolled (Spanish: cuota) part of the Mexico Federal Highways, paralleling Fed. 1. There are two segments, one in the state of Baja California and another in the state of Baja California Sur.

== Baja California ==
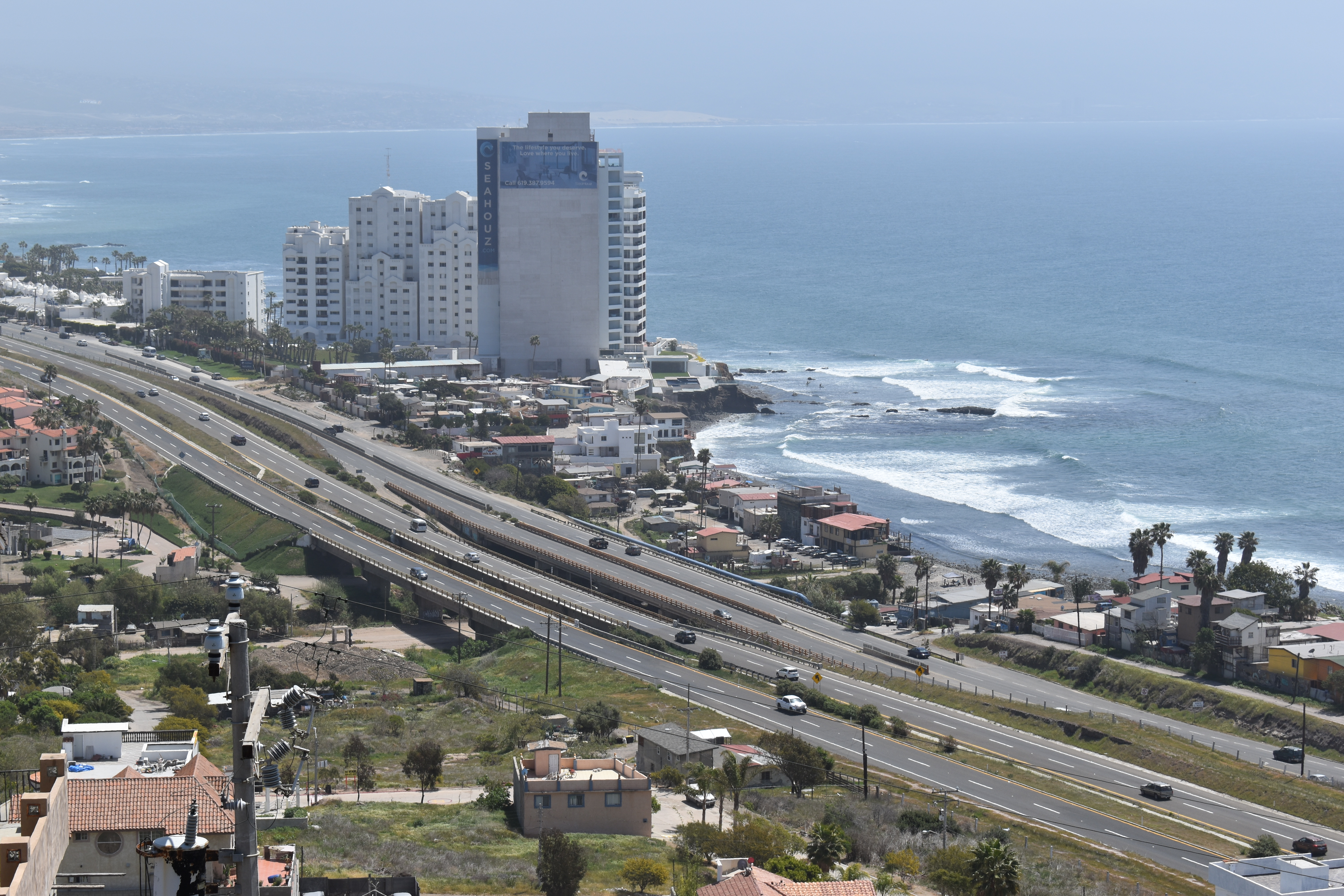
Fed. 1D in El Morro, south of Rosarito Beach, taken from the Christ of the Sacred Heart monument. Fed. 1 parallels the highway on the right.

Fed. 1D starts in Baja California and is 98.17 km (61.00 mi) long. Between Avenida Mar Báltico (Baltic Sea Avenue) and the northern terminus, it is locally known as Segunda Benito Juárez. The rest of Fed. 1D is locally known as tolled Autopista Escenica Tijuana-Ensenada (Tijuana-Ensenada scenic highway). Fed. 1D is a high-speed alternative to the neighboring Fed. 1, as it is four lanes wide. Due to its proximity to the Pacific Ocean, it is more scenic than Fed. 1 between Tijuana and Ensenada.

There are three toll plazas along the highway that each collect 44 pesos per automobile. The first or northernmost toll plaza is located at km 5, within the city of Tijuana. The second toll plaza is located in Rosarito Beach, and the third and final toll plaza is located just a few kilometers north of Ensenada.

On December 19, 2013, several small earthquakes occurred within the region, causing a 300 metres (980 ft) section of Fed. 1D to collapse, falling over 100 metres (330 ft) into the ocean below at km 93. On December 28, 2013, two cement trucks were driving along this stretch when the highway collapsed with no one hurt. The road remain closed to all traffic in both directions for nearly a year while the highway was repaired. Traffic was re-routed along Fed. 1 (inland) during the Fed. 1D closure. The highway reopened to all traffic on December 16, 2014.

2022 automobile tolls are:

- Ensenada to La Misión: 44 pesos;
- La Misión to Rosarito: 40 pesos;
- Rosarito to Tijuana: 40 pesos.

== Baja California Sur ==
The only toll road in Baja California Sur is the Libramiento Aeropuerto Los Cabos - San José del Cabo - Cabo San Lucas. This road provides direct connection between the Los Cabos International Airport (SJD), San José del Cabo and Cabo San Lucas, with the extension to the latter opening in 2015. It is 58.894 kilometres (36.595 mi) long and operated by Caminos y Puentes Federales.

The road was closed in 2015 due to damage from Tropical Storm Lidia. Two bridges collapsed and were subsequently repaired. The road later reopened.

2022 automobile tolls are:

- SJD Airport to San José del Cabo: 42 pesos;
- SJD Airport to Cabo San Lucas: 116 pesos;
- SJD Airport to El Mangle (for Highway 19): 103 pesos;
- and lesser rates for intermediate journeys.
