= El Pescadero =

Town in La Paz Municipality, Baja California Sur, Mexico

Coordinates: 23°21′51″N 110°10′06″W

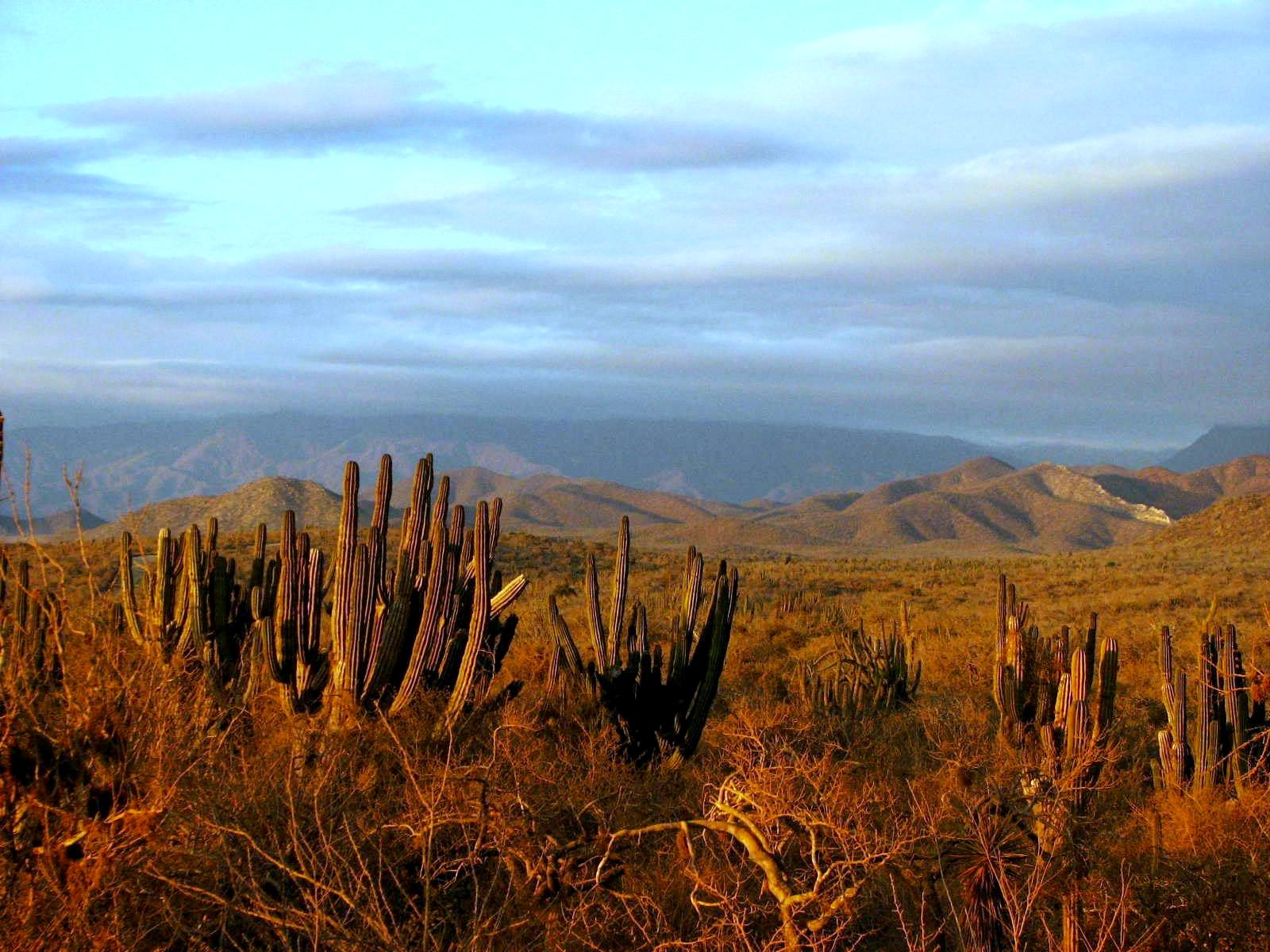
A view of cardones in El Pescadero

El Pescadero is a small village in the municipality of La Paz in the Mexican state of Baja California Sur. It is located at km 64 on Federal Highway 19 on the Pacific Ocean about 8 kilometers South of Todos Santos which is about a one-hour drive north of Cabo San Lucas. The 2020 INEGI census reported a population of 2,245 inhabitants.

== Climate ==
The climate is heavily influenced by the Pacific Ocean, which moderates the temperatures year round. Pescadero is bordered by the Sierra de la Laguna mountains to the East. In the huerta area of Pescadero (the farm land area,) palm-lined roads and farms co-exist with low-density private residences. A common sight in the huerta are the chili and basil fields. Most of these crops are grown for export.

Commercial farming in Pescadero flourishes because of an ample supply of underground water funneled down from the mountains. Air from the Pacific Ocean is pushed up the Sierra de la Laguna mountain range and is met with hotter air from the Gulf of California, resulting in frequent mountain rain storms that persist through the summer and fall.

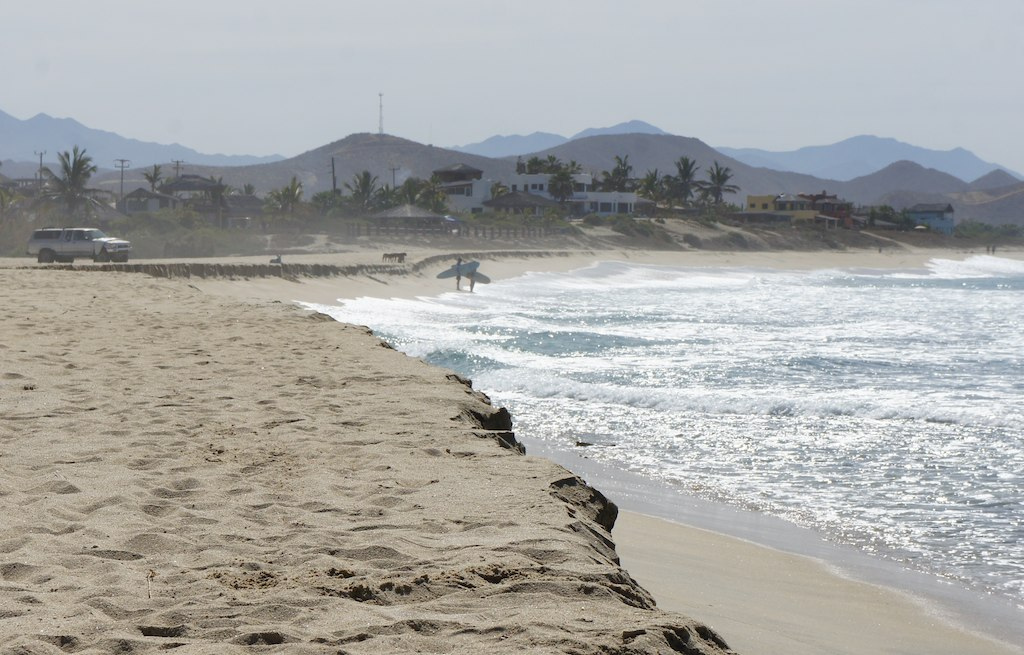
A beach in El Pescadero are commons surf spots in the area

Climate data for El Pescadero (1991–2020)
Month	Jan	Feb	Mar	Apr	May	Jun	Jul	Aug	Sep	Oct	Nov	Dec	Year
Record high °C (°F)	37 (99)	37.5 (99.5)	39 (102)	38.5 (101.3)	39.5 (103.1)	38 (100)	39 (102)	39 (102)	39.5 (103.1)	39.5 (103.1)	37.5 (99.5)	39 (102)	39.5 (103.1)
Mean daily maximum °C (°F)	26.9 (80.4)	26.6 (79.9)	26.4 (79.5)	26.9 (80.4)	26.6 (79.9)	27.9 (82.2)	31.8 (89.2)	33.2 (91.8)	32.7 (90.9)	32.0 (89.6)	30.5 (86.9)	27.9 (82.2)	29.1 (84.4)
Daily mean °C (°F)	18.6 (65.5)	18.3 (64.9)	18.3 (64.9)	18.8 (65.8)	19.1 (66.4)	21.3 (70.3)	26.0 (78.8)	27.7 (81.9)	27.4 (81.3)	25.2 (77.4)	22.7 (72.9)	19.8 (67.6)	21.9 (71.4)
Mean daily minimum °C (°F)	10.2 (50.4)	10.0 (50.0)	10.2 (50.4)	10.7 (51.3)	11.7 (53.1)	14.8 (58.6)	20.2 (68.4)	22.3 (72.1)	22.2 (72.0)	18.3 (64.9)	14.9 (58.8)	11.6 (52.9)	14.8 (58.6)
Record low °C (°F)	3.5 (38.3)	1 (34)	1.5 (34.7)	4 (39)	1.2 (34.2)	2.5 (36.5)	2 (36)	13 (55)	15 (59)	3 (37)	7.5 (45.5)	5 (41)	1 (34)
Average precipitation mm (inches)	7.6 (0.30)	7.9 (0.31)	0.5 (0.02)	0.1 (0.00)	0.0 (0.0)	0.8 (0.03)	8.5 (0.33)	47.0 (1.85)	84.6 (3.33)	14.8 (0.58)	11.6 (0.46)	8.2 (0.32)	191.6 (7.54)
Average precipitation days (≥ 0.1 mm)	0.9	0.6	0.1	0.0	0.0	0.1	1.0	3.0	3.8	1.1	0.8	0.6	12.0
Source: Servicio Meteorologico Nacional

== Surfing ==
Surf breaks punctuate the length of the peninsula's Pacific coast. Two of the best are located in El Pescadero: Los Cerritos and San Pedrito. Both beaches have right breaks. Los Cerritos is better for beginner and intermediate surfers, while San Pedrito is considered an advanced surfer's break because of its rocky bottom and strong currents.

== Festivals ==
Each March, the puebla hosts the Chili and Strawberry Festival, celebrating and promoting the area's agriculture. Organic produce and plants are offered for sale, food is available to sample, and agricultural products and tools are on display from vendors. The festival includes a dance, crowning of a queen, and a cabalgante - a procession of horse and riders from Todos Santos to the festival in Pescadero.
