= Chapingo Autonomous University =

Agricultural college in Texcoco, Mexico

- Universidad Autónoma Chapingo
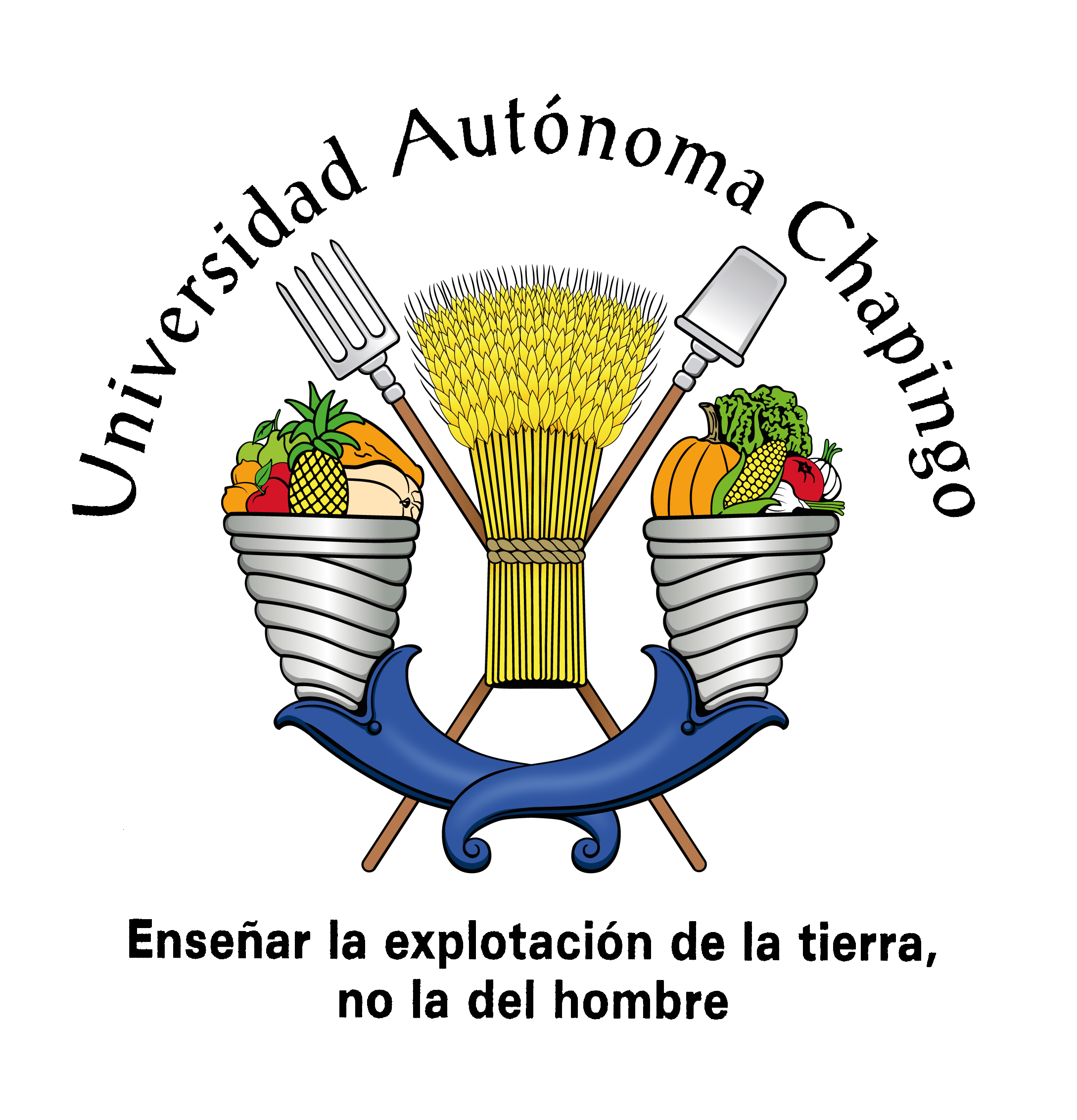
- Chapingo Autonomous University seal (Unofficial)
- Former names: Escuela Nacional de Agricultura (National School of Agriculture, 1854)
- Motto: Spanish: Enseñar la explotación de la tierra, no la del hombre
- Motto in English: To teach the exploitation of the land, not the exploitation of the men.
- Type: Public university
- Established: 22 February 1854
- Faculty: 1,254 (2017)
- Students: 9,493 (2017)
- Undergraduates: 5,203 (2017)
- Postgraduates: 597
- Other students: 3,693^{a} (2017)
- Location: Chapingo (municipality of Texcoco), State of Mexico, Mexico; 19.489644°N 98.893551°W
- Campus: Rural
- Colors: Blue and silver
- Nickname: Wild Bulls
- Website: www.chapingo.mx
- ^{a} This university has high school education.

Universidad Autónoma Chapingo (Chapingo Autonomous University) is a Mexican agricultural college located in Texcoco, State of Mexico. The university is a federally funded public institution of higher education. It offers technical and full bachelors' degrees as well as having scientific and technological research programs. Many of these programs are related to agriculture, forestry and fishing.

The school began as the Escuela Nacional de Agricultura (National School of Agriculture) which was founded in 1854 at the Monastery of San Jacinto in Mexico City. The school was moved in 1923 by President Álvaro Obregón to the former Hacienda of Chapingo, which was created by the Marques Francisco Antonio de Medina y Picazzo at the end of the 17th century, and had belonged to the Society of Jesus during the 18th century, until the religious order was expelled from Spanish territories. Postgraduate studies were added in 1959. The school received autonomous status in 1978. It offers courses of study in Forestry, Agricultural Economics, Agricultural Industries, Irrigation, Rural Sociology and more.

== Muralism ==
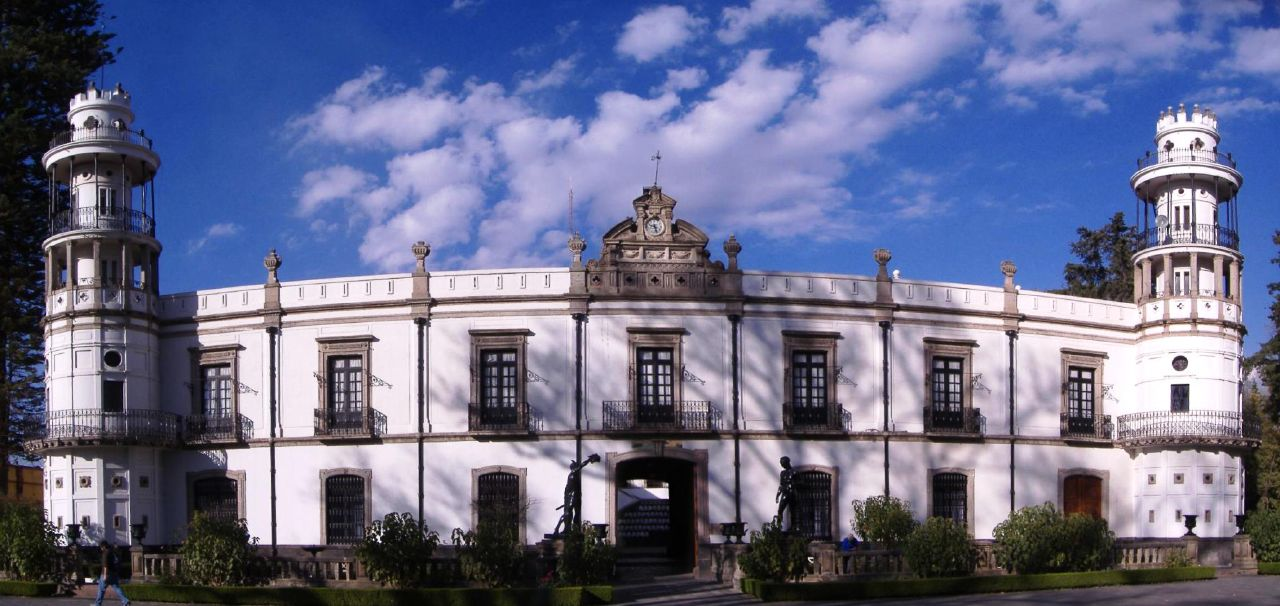
The Rectorate of Chapingo Autonomous University.

The main attraction for visitors at this school is its murals, especially the murals in the chapel by Diego Rivera. The room was an old hacienda chapel, but is now the University Ceremonies Room. This work was begun in 1924 and completed in 1927. Rivera painted 41 separate panels that cover the walls and ceiling of the room. The murals contain imagery relating to the revolutionary struggles of the peasants and working class of Mexico and the fertility and cycles of nature. Covering an area of over 700m^{2}, the work divides into three parts. The left panels depict man's struggle to have land, the right panels show the evolution of Mother Nature and the center shows the communion between man and earth. The most prominent panel at the front of the room is titled Tierra Fecunda (translated Abundant Earth) and features a nude woman reclining in a landscape accompanied by the personifications of the natural forces of wind, water, and fire. Three smaller figures represent humanity who have created machines to harness natural energy. The murals on the south wall continue the theme of nature, showing cycles of germination, growth, and flowering. The murals on the north wall are devoted to images of revolution, suggesting that revolution follows similar natural cycles of germination, growth, and fruition. On both sides, Rivera included images of death—buried seeds and buried revolutionary martyrs. It is considered to be one of Rivera's best works. More recently, the school acquired an unnamed mural by Luis Nishizawa. This work was produced during his last year at the Escuela Nacional de Artes Plasticas (ENAP) of UNAM and depicts the agriculture of Mexico in both the past and the present. The work is six meters high, nine meters wide and in the form of a triangle. It is placed in a building that is commonly called "El Partenon."

The school is also home to the National Museum of Agriculture. The 2,000 m^{2} facility presents the development of agriculture in Mexico from the pre-Hispanic past to the present day. The collection has about 4,000 objects relating to technology, agronomy including farming implements and photographs by Hanz Gutmann.

== Academics and Ranking ==
The Chapingo Autonomous University offers a wide variety of agricultural focused undergraduate degrees to be completed in four years such as Economics, Statistics, Agri-foods Networks, Horticulture, Business and Administration, and International Trade. This offer also includes a list of engineering programs such as Forestry, Agricultural Irrigation, Agricultural Industry, Agricultural Ecology, Agricultural Mechanics, Forestry Industry, Forestry Restoration, Renewable Natural Resources, Plant Science, Soil Agronomics, Animal Science, Tropical Zones, Rural Sociology, Agricultural Economics, Agricultural Parasitology, Agri-food Industry and Agroforestry Development.

Chapingo has been ranked in the top 10 Mexican universities since the 1980s and number 1 for high school since 2012. In accordance with the QS World University Rankings, Chapingo is ranked 751-800 in 2023, 251-300 by Subject in Agricultural Sciences, and according to the same source, Chapingo has fallen in rank among Latin American universities, from 126 in 2015 to 181-190 in 2023.

== Notable alumni ==
- Félix Agramont Cota, first governor of Baja California Sur
- Álvaro Carrillo, Mexican popular music composer and songwriter
- Teobaldo Eguiluz Piedra, entrepreneur and globally renowned figure in agriculture and forest genetics
- Víctor Villalobos, Secretary of Agriculture and Rural Development (SADER) under President Andrés Manuel López Obrador (starting 2018)
- Mario Moreno (Cantinflas), popular comedian and actor (never graduated)
- Silvano Aureoles Conejo, former governor of Michoacan
- Efraím Hernández Xolocotzi, acclaimed botanist
- José Clemente Orozco, muralist, caricaturist, agricultural topographer, and mathematician
- María Luisa Albores González, secretary of environment and natural resources (SEMARNAT) under President Andrés Manuel López Obrador (starting 2020)
