= Ángel César Mendoza Arámburo =

Mexican politician

Angel Arámburo

Governor of Baja California Sur
- In office April 6, 1975 – April 4, 1981
- Preceded by: Félix Agramont Cota
- Succeeded by: Alberto Alvarado Arámburo

Personal details
- Born: 15 December 1934 La Paz, Baja California Sur
- Died: 25 March 2014 (aged 79)
- Party: Institutional Revolutionary Party
- Education: National Autonomous University of Mexico

Ángel César Mendoza Arámburo (15 December 1934 – 25 March 2014) was a Mexican politician, the first elected governor in the state of Baja California Sur for the period 1975 to 1981. As a lawyer for the National Autonomous University of Mexico, he held various positions within the Institutional Revolutionary Party. He was federal deputy in the legislature XLVII Congress and was Secretary for Tax Inspectorate of Ministry of Finance and Public Credit (1982). Acting as governor, founded in 1976, the Autonomous University of Baja California Sur. He was married to Luz Garayzar with whom he had three children: Guadalupe, Carlos and Cesar Angel.

== Biography ==
He was born in La Paz (Baja California Sur) on December 15, 1934, the son of Angel Mendoza Sabido and Julia Arámburo. He attended elementary and high school in La Paz, BCS 1951 to 1952 he attended the high schools in the National Preparatory School in 1953, he enrolled at the Faculty of Law at the National Autonomous University of Mexico, where he graduated in 1957. He graduated in 1963 with a thesis on "Reforms Needed to Land Code in force."

== Sources ==
- Historical, political, and constitutional of Baja California Sur in Virtual law library (See October 2, 2009)
- General History of Baja California Sur (Spanish) in Google Books (See October 12, 2009)
- Google Books Mexican Political Biographies (See October 14, 2009)
