= Alberto Alvarado Arámburo =

Mexican politician (1925–1996)

Governor of Baja California Sur
- In office April 5, 1981 – April 4, 1987
- Preceded by: Angel César Mendoza Arámburo
- Succeeded by: Víctor Manuel Liceaga Ruibal

Personal details
- Born: February 4, 1925 La Paz, Baja California Sur, Mexico
- Died: February 14, 1996 (aged 71) Mexico City, Mexico
- Party: PRI

Alberto Andrés Alvarado Arámburo (4 February 1925 – 14 February 1996) was a Mexican politician who served as the Governor of Baja California Sur from 1981 to 1987. A member of the Institutional Revolutionary Party (PRI), he succeeded his cousin, Angel César Mendoza Arámburo, as governor. He also served as a Senator and a federal deputy. He was shot and killed in Mexico City in 1996 during an attempted robbery.

There is a locality in Mulegé Municipality named after him.
