= Mexican Federal Highway 12 =

Highway in Mexico

Federal Highway 12
- Carretera federal 12

Route information
- Maintained by Secretariat of Infrastructure, Communications and Transportation
- Length: 68.00 km (42.25 mi)

Major junctions
- West end: Fed. 1 at Parador Punta Prieta
- East end: Bahía de los Ángeles

Location
- Country: Mexico
- State: Baja California

Highway system
- Mexican Federal Highways; List; Autopistas
← Fed. 11	→ Fed. 14

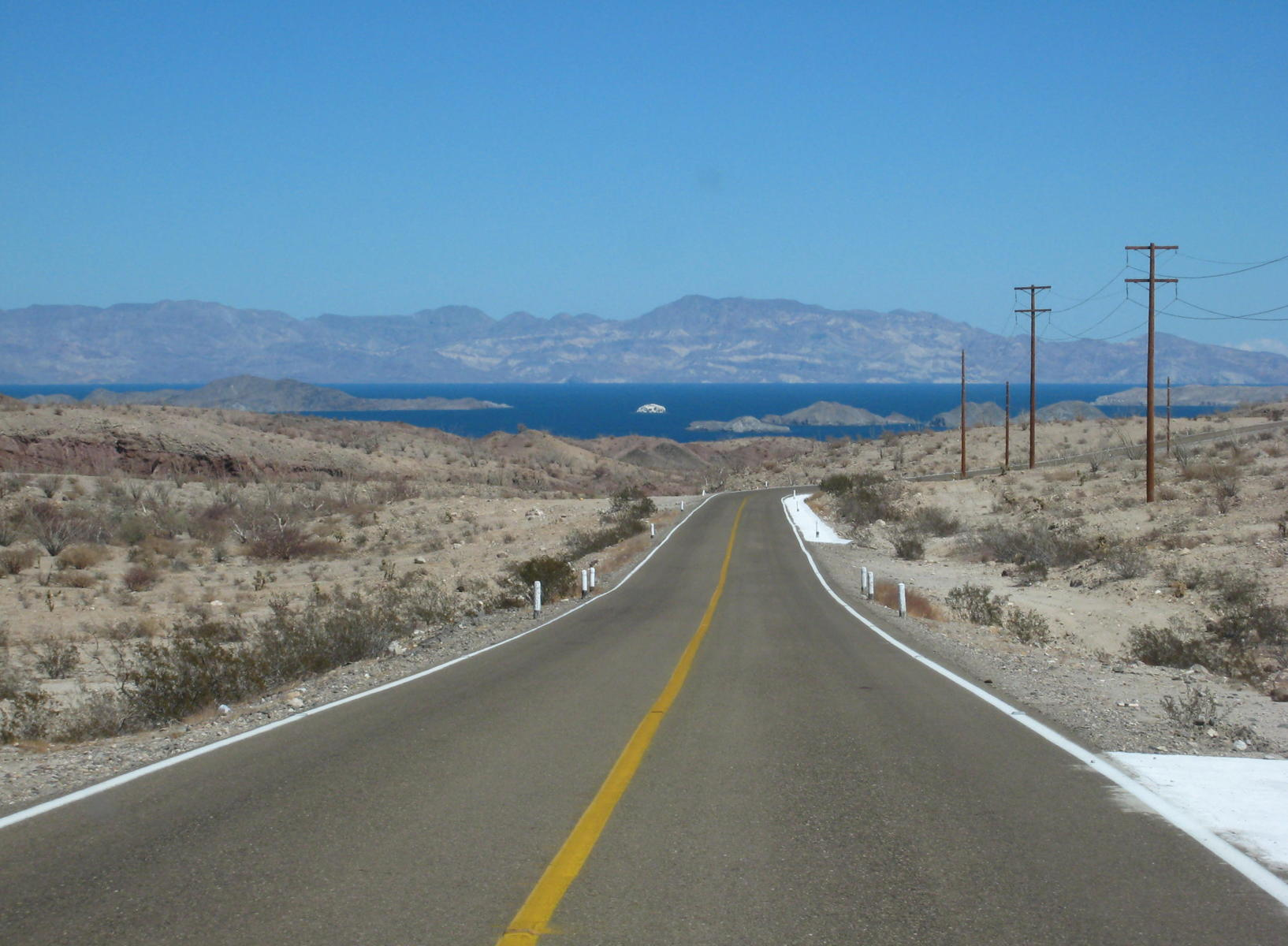
The first view of the Gulf of California along Fed. 12.

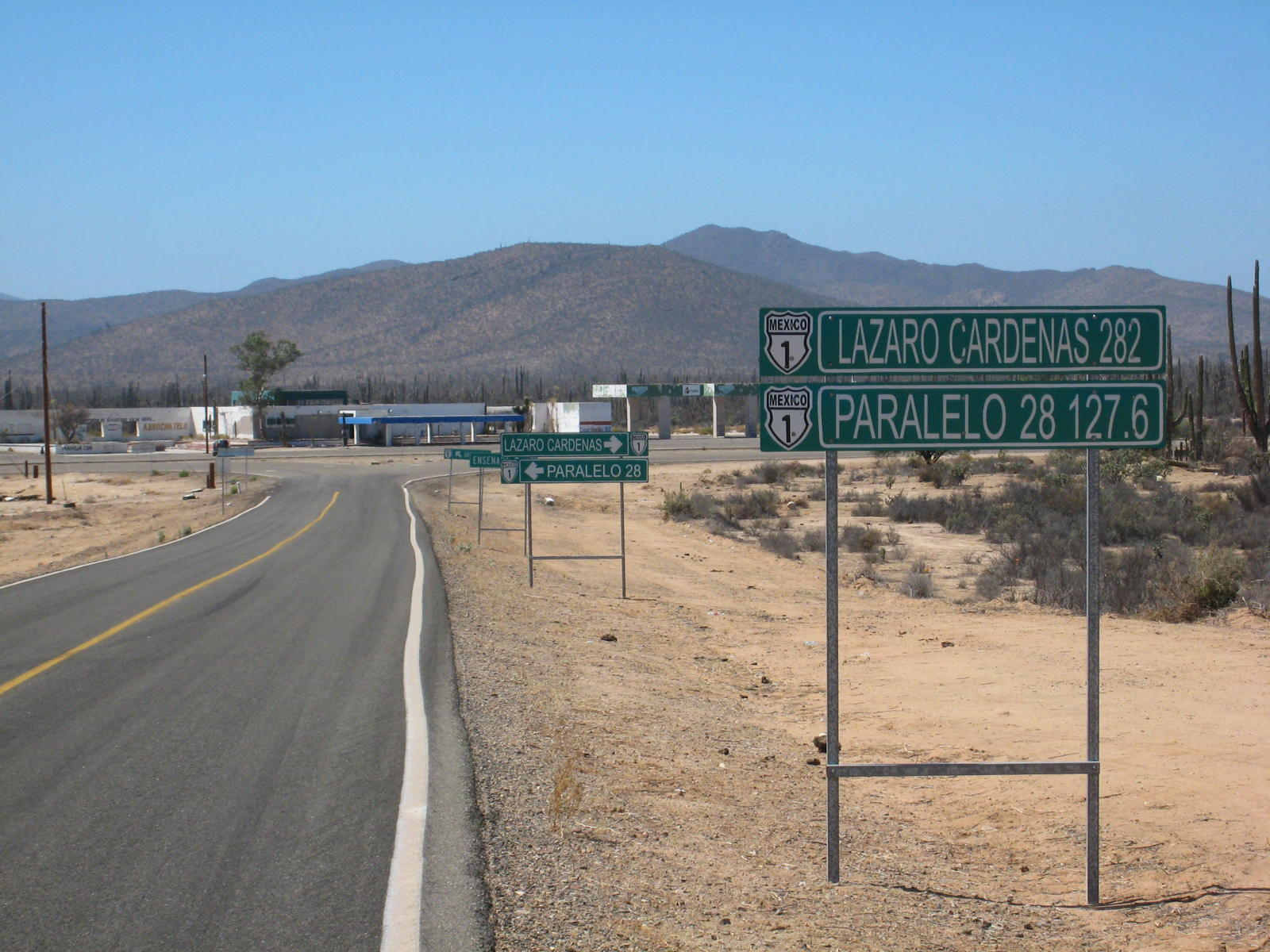
Fed. 12 approaching Parador Punta Prieta junction.

Federal Highway 12 (Spanish: Carretera Federal 12, Fed. 12) is a toll-free part of the federal highways corridors (Spanish: los corredores carreteros federales) of Mexico. Fed. 12 is set from Fed. 1 in central Baja California to Bahía de los Ángeles and its total length is 68 km (42.25 mi).
