= Villa Jesús María =

- Interactive map of Villa Jesús María
- Location in Baja California Location in Mexico
- Coordinates: 28°16′53″N 114°00′04″W
- Country: Mexico
- State: Baja California
- Municipality: San Quintín
- Elevation: 95 ft (29 m)

Population (2010)
  - City: 368
  - Urban: 0
- Time zone: UTC-8 (Northwest US Pacific)
  - Summer (DST): UTC-7 (Northwest)

Villa Jesús María, Baja California is a small town in Baja California, Mexico, on Highway 1 between El Rosarito to the north and Guerrero Negro to the south. It is located toward the southern end of the Sebastián Vizcaíno Bay, due east of Isla de Cedros. It is one of the boroughs (Spanish: delegaciones) of the San Quintín Municipality.

The main economic activity is fishing. In 2011, 3600 chocolate clams (Megapitaria squalida) were being extracted per month in Faro Viejo, a location in the Villa Jesús María borough.

In June 2020 the State Attorney of Baja California, Juan Guillermo Ruiz Hernández, visited the Villa Jesús María to discuss issues of crime and insecurity with residents of the area.
