= Punta Prieta, Baja California =

Punta Prieta
- Location in Mexico
- Coordinates: 28°55′44″N 114°09′20″W
- Country: Mexico
- State: Baja California
- Municipality: San Quintín
- Elevation: 690 ft (210 m)

Population (2010)
  - City: 108
  - Urban: 0
- Time zone: UTC-8 (Northwest US Pacific)
  - Summer (DST): UTC-7 (Northwest)

Punta Prieta is a desert town in the Mexican state of Baja California, on Federal Highway 1.

== Parador Punta Prieta ==
A few kilometers magnetic north along Highway 1 is Parador Punta Prieta, where Highway 12 takes off to the east towards Bahía de los Ángeles and Punta La Gringa.

== See also ==
- Punta Prieta Airstrip

== Notes ==
There are at least two places named Punta Prieta in Mexico. Punta Prieta, Baja California Sur, is a small town on the west coast of Baja California Sur.
