= Todos Santos, Baja California Sur =

Todos Santos
- Town
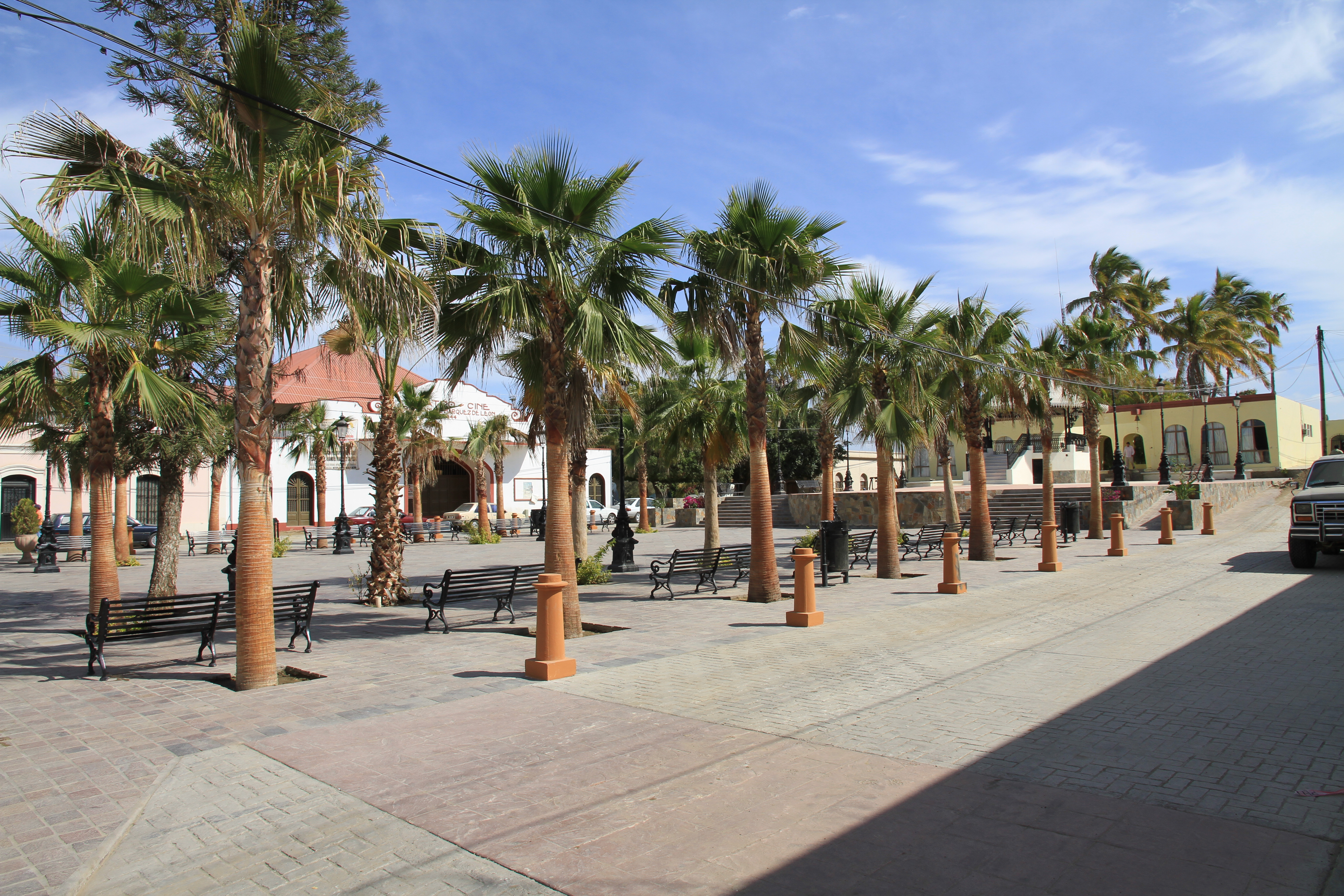
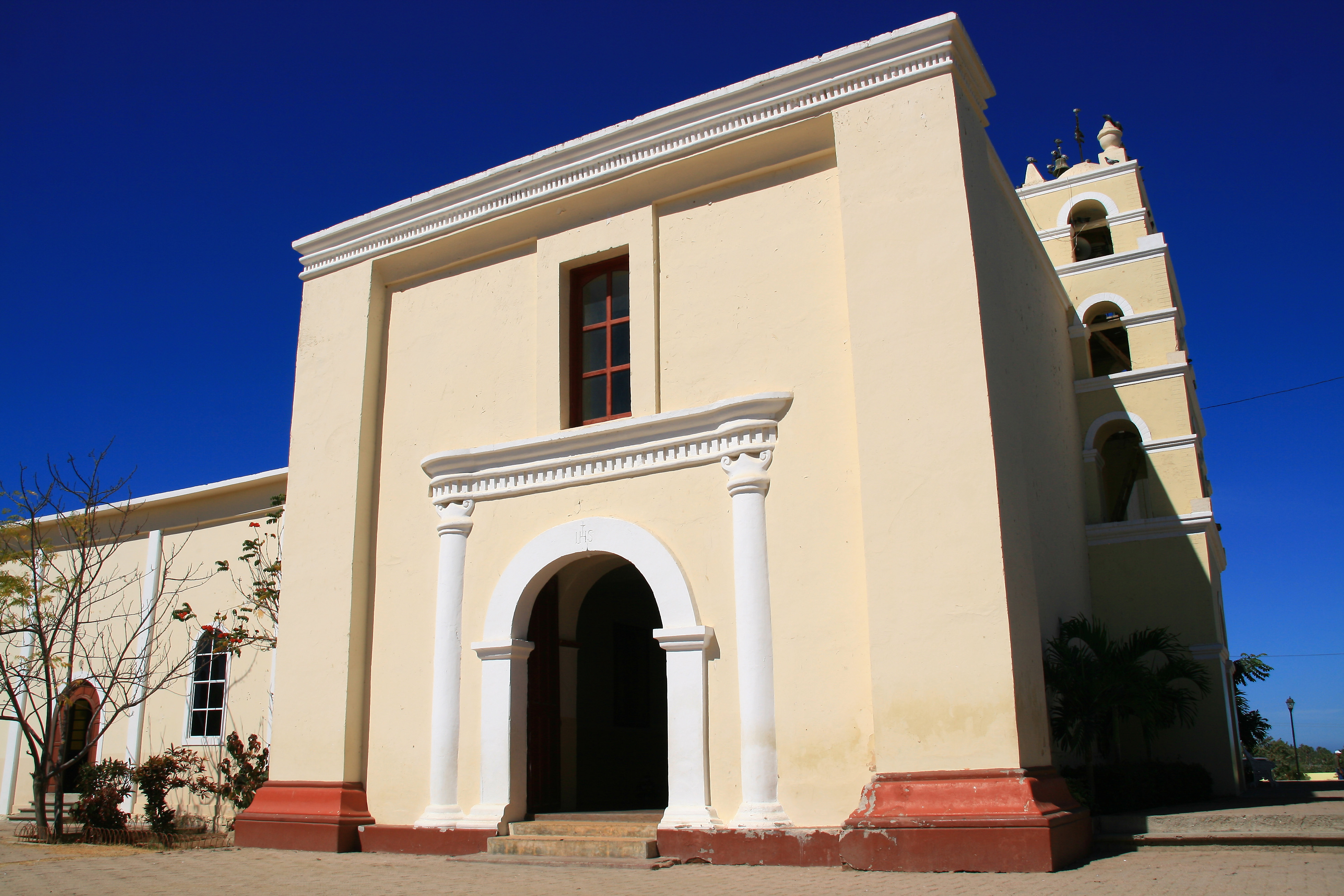
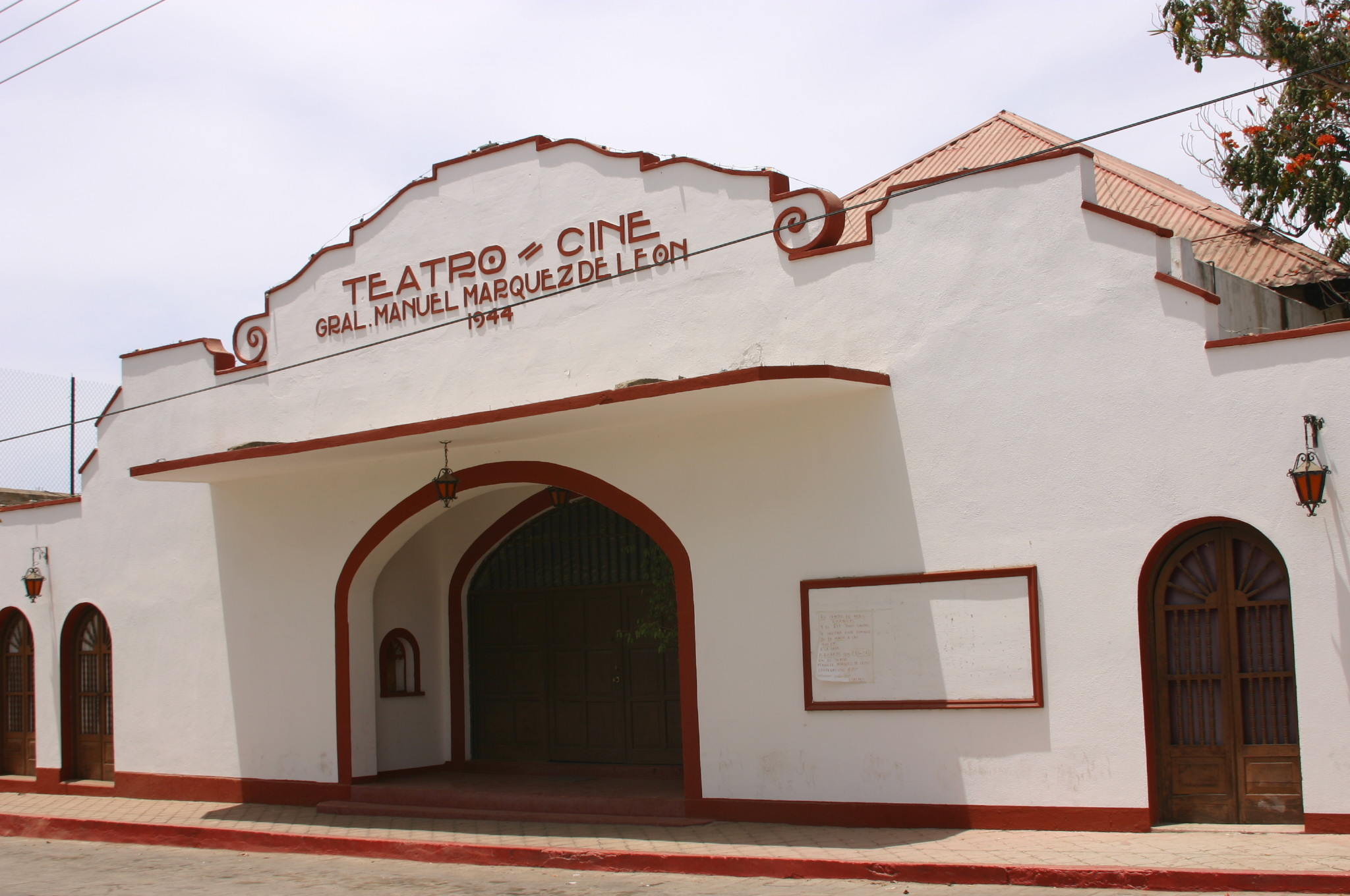
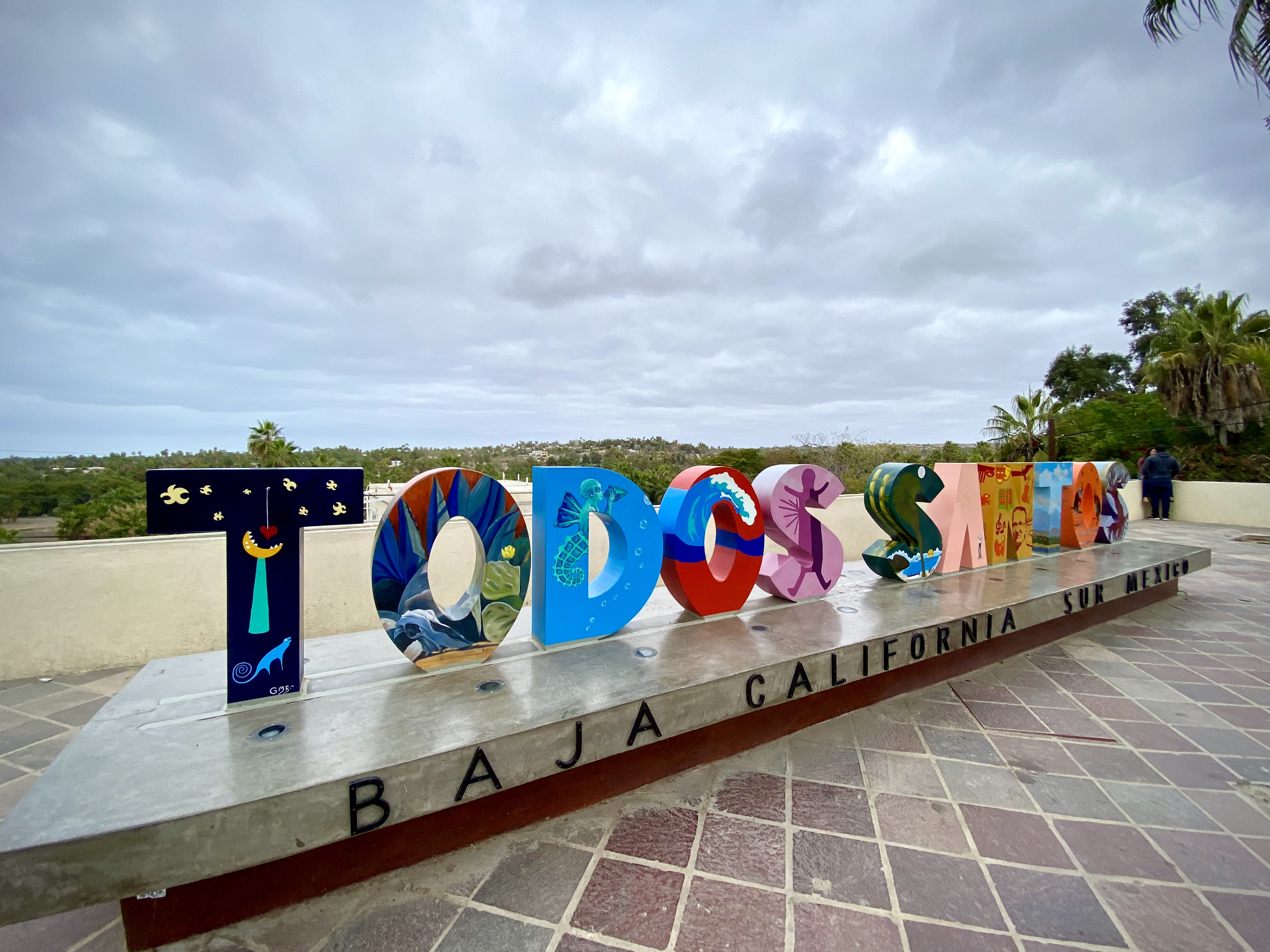
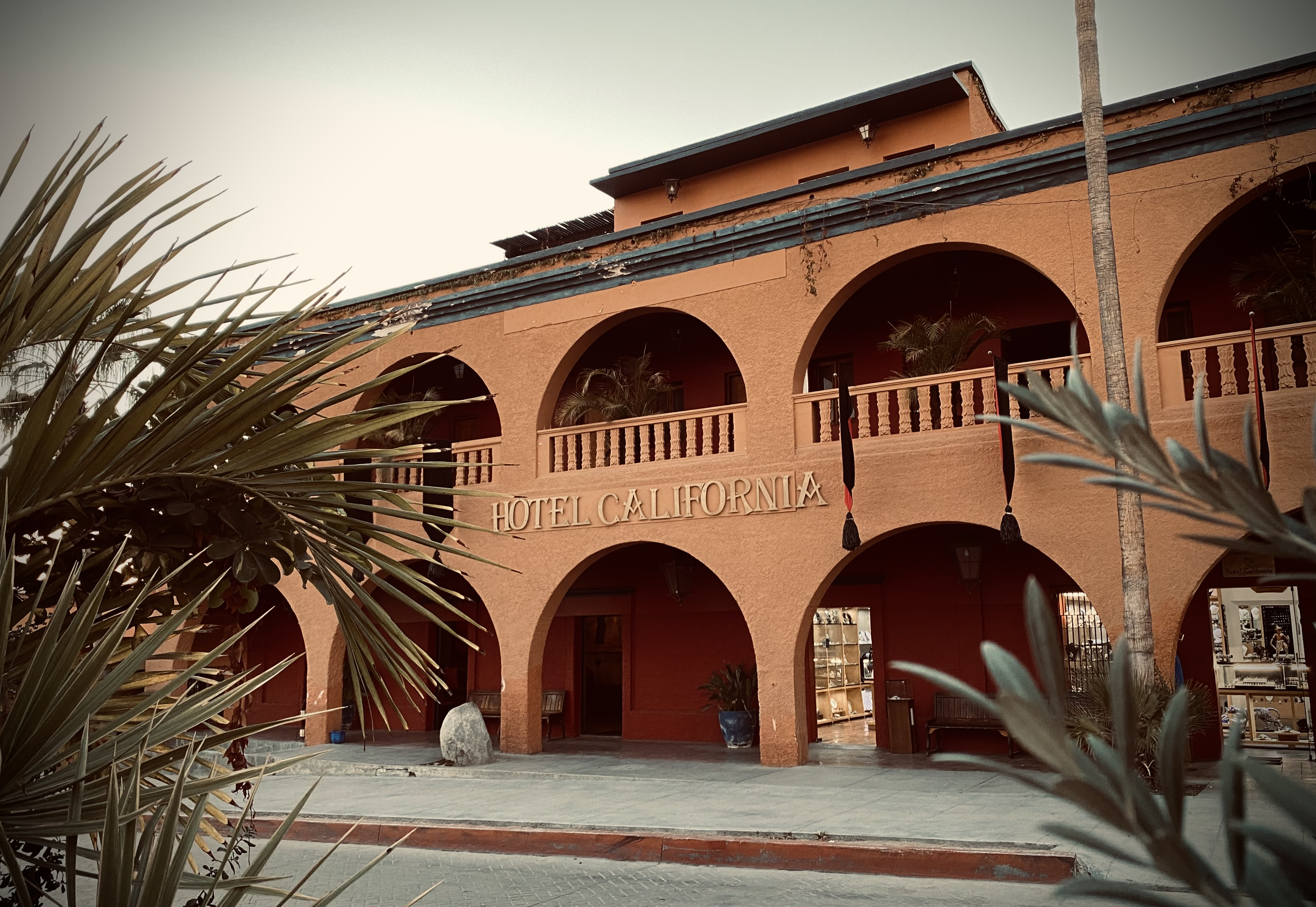
- Top: Todos Santos main plaza Middle: Misión Santa Rosa de las Palmas, Todos Santos Theater; Bottom: City letters, Hotel California

- Location in Baja California Sur Location in Mexico
- Coordinates: 23°26′55″N 110°13′24″W
- Country: Mexico
- State: Baja California Sur
- Municipality: La Paz
- Elevation: 130 ft (40 m)

Population (2020)
  - Total: 7,185
- Time zone: UTC–07:00 (Zona Pacífico)

Todos Santos (Spanish: [ˈtoðos ˈsantos]; "All Saints") is a small coastal town in the foothills of Mexico's Sierra de la Laguna Mountains, on the Pacific coast side of the Baja California Peninsula, about an hour's drive north of Cabo San Lucas on Highway 19 and an hour's drive southwest from La Paz. Todos Santos is located at the Tropic of Cancer in the municipality of La Paz. The population was 7,185 at the census of 2020. It is the second-largest town in the municipality. The town is known for its historical significance, surfing, a regionally pleasurable climate, and the arts.

== History ==
The region that now includes Todos Santos was originally inhabited by the Guaycura people (Waicura, Waikuri, Guaycuri), a nomadic hunter-gatherer group whose range extended up to modern day Loreto. In the early days of Spanish settlement, a mission was established in what is now Todos Santos, Misión Santa Rosa de las Palmas, founded by father Jaime Bravo in 1723. In 1724, it was renamed Nuestra Señora del Pilar de La Paz. Located across the street to the southwest from the small town plaza, this mission contains the statue of the Virgin of Pilar, which is the focus of Todos Santos's main festival in November.

During the Mexican American War, the Skirmish of Todos Santos, the last battle of the war, was fought near the town on March 30, 1848.

During the 19th century, following the secularization of the missions, Todos Santos thrived as the Baja sugarcane capital, supporting eight sugar mills at the end of the 19th century. Only one existed by the time the town's freshwater spring dried up in 1950, and that last mill closed in 1965.

Todos Santos faced a bleak future until the spring came back to life in 1981 and the Mexican Government paved Highway 19 in the mid-1980s. The highway brought tourists and the rich farmlands have been revived. The town now prospers from farming vegetables, chilies, avocados, papayas and mangoes, as well as from fishing and ranching.

=== Contemporary Todos Santos ===
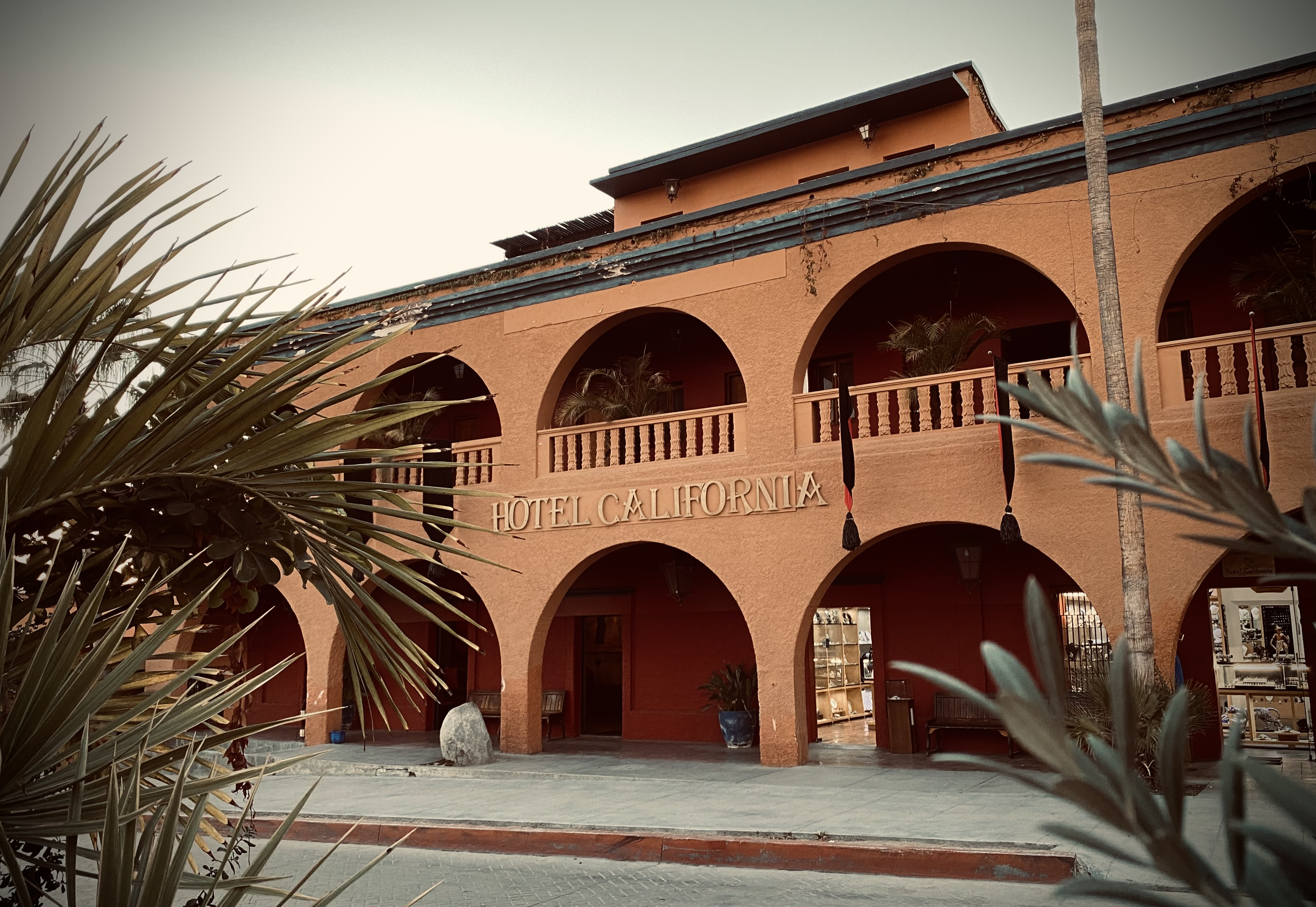
Hotel California

The Hotel California is a favorite stop because of the name association with the song made famous by the Eagles, even though the song does not specifically reference this particular hotel, nor any other existing hotel. On May 1, 2017, the Eagles band filed a lawsuit against the Hotel California in the United States District Court for the District of Central California alleging Trademark Infringement in Violation of the Lanham Act, 15 U.S.C. § 1125 and Common Law Unfair Competition and Trademark Infringement. The Eagles were seeking relief and damages. The lawsuit was settled in 2018: the hotel continues to use the name, abandoned efforts to apply for a trademark in the United States, and now deny any connection with the song or the band.

Todos Santos is challenged by rapid population growth and overdevelopment, a problem possibly exacerbated by a controversial Urban Development Plan (LaPaz PDU). The city's water distribution system is overtaxed, leading to reduction in delivery to homes. The Todos Santos aquifer, the town's only water source, is facing over-extraction, saltwater intrusion, and invasion of arundo, a non-native grass that rapidly consumes groundwater. The power to Todos Santos comes from a power plant in La Paz, whose line to Todos Santos is operating over capacity, causing regular blackouts and damage to electrical equipment from surges. A coalition of residents, Protect Todos Santos, is working to address these issues through legal action and community organizing.

== Climate ==
Climate data for Todos Santos, Baja California Sur (1991–2020 normals, extremes 1939–present)
Month	Jan	Feb	Mar	Apr	May	Jun	Jul	Aug	Sep	Oct	Nov	Dec	Year
Record high °C (°F)	39 (102)	36 (97)	39 (102)	38 (100)	40 (104)	39 (102)	39 (102)	42 (108)	39 (102)	44 (111)	43 (109)	36 (97)	44 (111)
Mean daily maximum °C (°F)	25.2 (77.4)	25.3 (77.5)	25.2 (77.4)	25.2 (77.4)	25.3 (77.5)	26.6 (79.9)	30.3 (86.5)	32.1 (89.8)	31.7 (89.1)	31.3 (88.3)	29.0 (84.2)	26.2 (79.2)	27.8 (82.0)
Daily mean °C (°F)	18.3 (64.9)	18.2 (64.8)	18.1 (64.6)	18.2 (64.8)	18.9 (66.0)	21.2 (70.2)	25.2 (77.4)	27.1 (80.8)	26.6 (79.9)	25.4 (77.7)	22.3 (72.1)	19.1 (66.4)	21.6 (70.9)
Mean daily minimum °C (°F)	11.3 (52.3)	11.1 (52.0)	11.1 (52.0)	11.2 (52.2)	12.6 (54.7)	15.8 (60.4)	20.1 (68.2)	22.1 (71.8)	21.6 (70.9)	19.5 (67.1)	15.6 (60.1)	12.1 (53.8)	15.3 (59.5)
Record low °C (°F)	2 (36)	0 (32)	2.5 (36.5)	3 (37)	0 (32)	6 (43)	7 (45)	9 (48)	10 (50)	9 (48)	2 (36)	3 (37)	0 (32)
Average precipitation mm (inches)	12.4 (0.49)	5.1 (0.20)	1.1 (0.04)	0.0 (0.0)	0.4 (0.02)	1.9 (0.07)	6.0 (0.24)	44.6 (1.76)	94.7 (3.73)	22.8 (0.90)	13.3 (0.52)	7.5 (0.30)	209.8 (8.26)
Average precipitation days (≥ 0.1 mm)	1.4	0.5	0.4	0.0	0.2	0.2	1.0	3.3	3.7	1.3	1.2	0.6	13.8
Source: Servicio Meteorológico Nacional

== Notable residents ==
- Félix Agramont Cota, first Governor of Baja California Sur
- Peter Buck, musician
