= List of airports in Baja California =

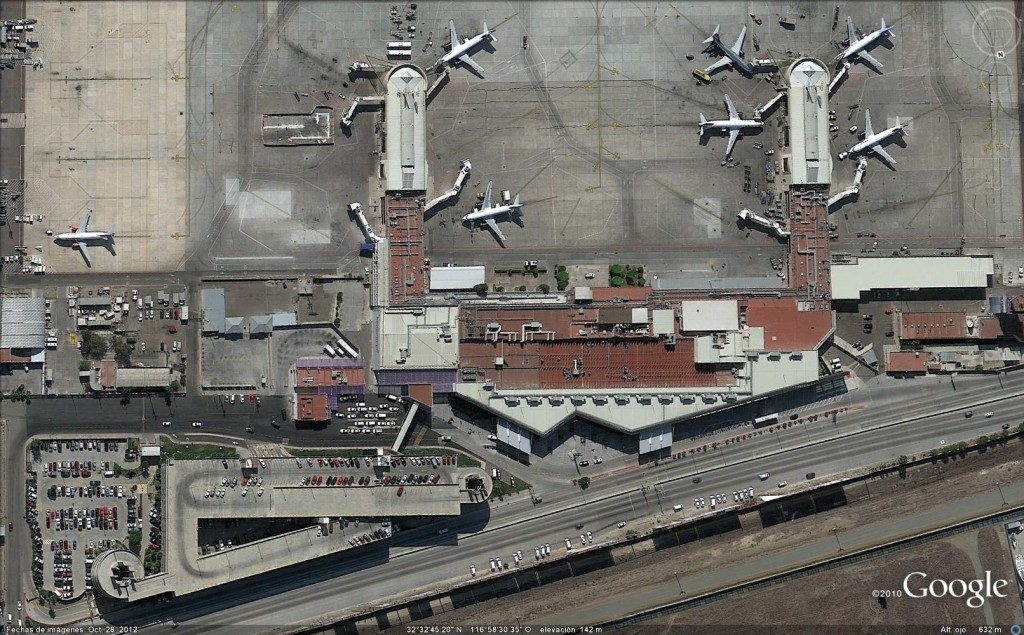
Aerial view of Tijuana International Airport

This is a list of airports in the state of Baja California, Mexico, categorized by airport name, ICAO and IATA codes, and the largest city served. It includes public, private, military, and defunct airports. Airports with scheduled passenger flights on commercial airlines are in bold, as of 2025. Separate Wikipedia lists cover airports in Baja California Sur and all airports in Mexico.

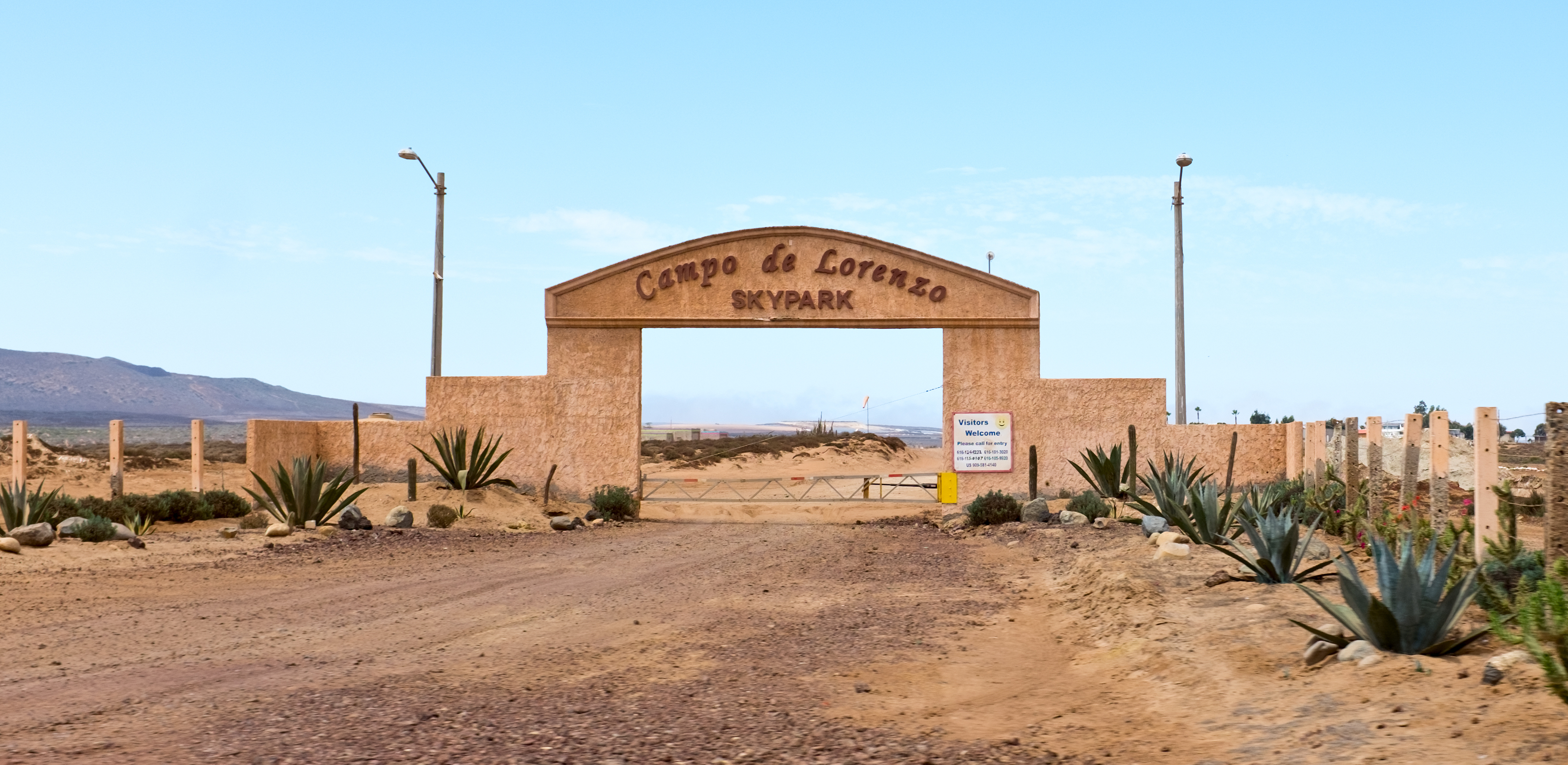
San Lorenzo Airpark in San Quintín, Baja California

Baja California has six airports and a vast network of airstrips—many unpaved—that serve its remote, sparsely populated communities, which are physically separated from mainland Mexico by the Gulf of California and vast desert regions. The state is home to Mexico's northernmost airport, located in Mexicali, and its westernmost airport, located in Tijuana.

Tijuana International Airport is the state’s largest and busiest airport, ranking as the fifth busiest in Mexico and one of the few binational airports in the world. It offers direct access to its terminal from Mexico as well as through its Cross Border Xpress (CBX) terminal in the United States, enabling it to serve the San Diego–Tijuana cross-border metro area.

== Airports ==
City served	ICAO	IATA	Airport name
International airports
Mexicali	MMML	MXL	**Mexicali International Airport**
San Felipe	MMSF	SFH	San Felipe International Airport
Tijuana	MMTJ	TIJ	**Tijuana International Airport**
Domestic airports
Cedros Island	MMCD		**Isla de Cedros Airport**
Guerrero Negro (Baja California Sur)	MMGR	GUB	**Guerrero Negro Airport**
Ensenada	MMES	ESE	**Ensenada Airport**
Airfields
Cataviña		CTV	Rancho Santa Inés Airstrip
El Rosario			El Rosario Airstrip
Ojos Negros			Real del Castillo Airstrip
Punta Final			Punta Final Airstrip
Punta Prieta			Punta Prieta Airstrip
Punta San Carlos			Punta San Carlos Airstrip
Punta San Francisquito			Punta San Francisquito Airfield
San Luis Gonzaga			Alfonsina's Airstrip
San Luis Gonzaga			Rancho Grande Airfield
San Quintín	MMLZB		Campo de Lorenzo Skypark
San Quintín			Cielito Lindo Airstrip
San Quintín			El Buen Pastor Airstrip
San Quintín			El Pedregal Airstrip
San Quintín			Los Pinos Airstrip
San Quintín			Rancho Magaña Airstrip
Private airfields
Bahía de los Ángeles			Muñoz Airstrip
El Barril			Rancho El Barril Airstrip
Rancho San José			Meling Ranch Airstrip
Military-only airfields
Guadalupe Island	MMGD		Guadalupe Island Naval Airstrip
San Quintín		SNQ	San Quintín Military Airstrip
Defunct airfields
Bahía de los Ángeles		~~BHL~~	Bahía de los Ángeles Airport
Bahía Soledad			Bahía Soledad Airstrip
Tecate			Tecate Airport

== See also ==
- List of airports in Mexico
- List of the busiest airports in Mexico
- Busiest airports in North America
- Busiest airports in Latin America
- Airfields in Baja California
- Airfields in Baja California Sur
- Small airstrips
- Military bases
- Air Force bases
- Naval air bases
- Lists of airports
- International airports
- Defunct airports
- Airports by ICAO code
- Airlines of Mexico
- Airline hubs
- Airline destinations
- Transportation in Mexico
- Tourism in Mexico
- Federal Civil Aviation Agency
- Grupo Aeroportuario del Sureste
- Grupo Aeroportuario del Pacífico
- Grupo Aeroportuario del Centro Norte
- Aeropuertos y Servicios Auxiliares
- List of busiest airports by passenger traffic
- Metropolitan areas of Mexico
- Cross Border Xpress (CBX)
- Mexico–United States border
- San Diego-Tijuana
- Aéreo Servicio Guerrero
