= Punta San Carlos Airstrip =

- IATA: none; ICAO: none

Summary
- Airport type: Public
- Location: Punta San Carlos
- Elevation AMSL: 12 ft / 3 m
- Coordinates: 29°37′10″N 115°30′12″W
- Interactive map of Punta San Carlos Airstrip

Runways
| Direction | Length | | Surface |
| Direction | ft | m | Surface |
|---|---|---|---|
| 11/29 | 3,154 | 961 | Soil |

Punta San Carlos Airstrip is a public dirt airstrip located in Punta San Carlos, Municipality of Ensenada, Baja California, Mexico, a little camp located on the Pacific Ocean coast, 50 miles South of El Rosario de Arriba. The airstrip is used solely for general aviation purposes. The PSK code is used as identifier.
