= Rancho Grande (disambiguation) =

Rancho Grande is a municipality in Matagalpa, Nicaragua.

Rancho Grande may also refer to:

- Rancho Grande, New Mexico, a census-designated place in Catron County
- Rancho Grande (film), a 1940 Western film directed by Frank McDonald
- Rancho Grande (Mexibús), a bus rapid transit station in Nezahualcóyotl, Mexico
- Rancho Grande Airstrip, in Ensenada, Baja California, Mexico
- Rancho Grande River, in Santa Catarina, Brazil
