= Cielito Lindo (disambiguation) =

"Cielito Lindo" is a Spanish Mexican song written by Quirino Mendoza y Cortés.

Cielito Lindo may also refer to:

- Cielito Lindo Airstrip, a public-use dirt airstrip located South of San Quintín, Municipality of Ensenada, Baja California, Mexico
- Cielito Lindo (1936 film), also known as Beautiful Sky, a 1936 film by directors Robert Quigley and Roberto Gavaldón
- ¡Cielito Lindo! (1957 film), a film by director Miguel M. Delgado
- Cielito Lindo (film), also known as Beautiful Heaven, a 2010 film directed by Alejandro Alcondez
