= Bahía Soledad Airstrip =

- IATA: none; ICAO: none

Summary
- Coordinates: 31°34′59″N 116°39′01″W
- Interactive map of Bahía Soledad Airstrip

Runways
Direction	Length		Surface
Direction	ft	m	Surface
02/20	2,375	724	Soil

Bahía Soledad Airstrip was a private dirt airstrip located in Bahía Soledad, a private beach located 30 km south of Ensenada, Municipality of Ensenada, Baja California, Mexico, on the Pacific Ocean coast. The airstrip was used solely for general aviation. From April 2007, the airport was abandoned. The BSO code is used as an identifier. The only operator at the airport is Aeromaan, with only occasional flights.
