= Guadalupe Island Naval Airfield =

Guadalupe Island Naval Airfield Aeropista Naval Militar de Isla Guadalupe
- IATA: none; ICAO: MMGD; LID: IGD

Summary
- Airport type: Military
- Operator: Secretariat of the Navy
- Serves: Guadalupe Island
- Location: Ensenada Municipality
- Commander: Vice Admiral Juan Carlos Vera Mijares
- Elevation AMSL: 1,935 ft (590 m)
- Coordinates: 29°01′25″N 118°16′20″W
- Website: www.gob.mx/semar/directorio-de-mandos-navales

Map
- Location of the airport in Mexico

Runways
Direction	Length		Surface
Direction	ft	m	Surface
05/23	3,945	1,202	Asphalt
- SEMAR

The Guadalupe Island Naval Military Airstrip (ICAO Code: MMGD – AFAC Code: IGD), or simply Guadalupe Island Airfield, is a small military airfield located on Guadalupe Island, Baja California, and is operated by the Mexican Navy. The westernmost airfield in Mexico, it has a runway that is 1,202 meters long and 28 meters wide.

Located in the public use subzone known as "Campo Pista," the airfield covers 188 hectares (464.6 acres). Also located on this land is the former Guadalupe Island airfield, situated one mile southeast of the current one, which had an 800-meter unpaved runway. The airfield is used for by aircraft transporting personnel, equipment, food, and fish products for the Mexican Navy, the National Commission of Natural Protected Areas (CONANP), and the Fishermen's Cooperative Society. It is also one of the main access points to the island for researchers and tourists seeking to dive and observe great white sharks.

The Mexican Navy is the agency responsible for inspecting the luggage of passengers taking flights to Guadalupe Island from Ensenada Airport, in order to prevent the introduction of biosecurity risk factors related to invasive alien species (IAS).
