= Alfonsina =

Alfonsina may refer to:

- Alfonsina (given name)
- Alfonsina (film), 1957 Argentine film
- Alfonsina's Airstrip, Mexican airstrip

== See also ==
- Alfonsín (disambiguation)
- Alfonsine, Italian comune
- Alfonsino, species of fish
- Alfonsine tables, astronomical table
