= Los Pinos Airstrip =

- IATA: none; ICAO: none

Summary
- Airport type: Public
- Location: San Quintín, Baja California
- Elevation AMSL: 48 ft / 14 m
- Coordinates: 30°24′49″N 115°52′07″W
- Interactive map of Los Pinos Airstrip

Runways
Direction	Length		Surface
Direction	ft	m	Surface
10/28	3,725	1,135	Concrete

Los Pinos Airstrip is a paved airstrip located South of San Quintín, Municipality of Ensenada, Baja California, Mexico, just on the East side of the Federal Highway 1, to the East of "Hotel Santa Maria" and Cielito Lindo Airstrip. The Flying Samaritans' Mother Lode and Tucson chapters operate a monthly fly-in clinic here and in El Rosario to the south. The airstrip is used solely for general aviation purposes. As of April 2025, it is permanently closed to GA, including the Flying Samaritans.
