= Rancho San José =

Rancho San José may refer to:

- Rancho San Jose (Pacheco), historical Mexican land grant in present-day Marin County, California, United States
- Rancho San José (Palomares), historical Mexican land grant in present-day northeastern Los Angeles County, California, United States (now covering the areas of Pomona, LaVerne, San Dimas, Diamond Bar, Azusa, Covina, Walnut, Glendora, and Claremont)
- Rancho San José Airstrip, private dirt airstrip located in Ensenada, Baja California, Mexico
- Rancho San José de Buenos Ayres, historical Mexican land grant in present-day Los Angeles County, California, United States (now covering the areas of Westwood, UCLA, Holmby Hills, and Bel Air)
- Rancho San José del Valle, historical Mexican land grant in present-day San Diego County, California, United States
- Rancho San José y Sur Chiquito, historical Mexican land grant in present-day Big Sur, in Monterey County, California, United States
