= SNQ =

SNQ or snq may refer to:

- SNQ, the IATA code for San Quintín Military Airstrip, Baja California, Mexico
- SNQ, the Telegraph code for Shaoguan railway station, Guangdong, China
- snq, the ISO 639-3 code for Sangu language, Gabon
