= Campamento Militar Isla Guadalupe =

Military camp in Baja California, Mexico

- Location in Mexico
- Coordinates: 28°59′58″N 118°15′32″W
- Country: Mexico
- State: Baja California
- Municipality: Ensenada
- Elevation: 640 m (2,100 ft)

Population (2010)
  - Total: 15
- Time zone: UTC-8 (Northwest (US Pacific))
  - Summer (DST): UTC-7 (Northwest)

Campamento Militar Isla Guadalupe (translation: Guadalupe Island Military Camp) is a locality in Ensenada Municipality, Baja California, Mexico. It is located in Guadalupe Island, at an altitude of 640 meters. It is distinguished for being the westmost location in Mexico and Latin America.

The 2010 census recorded a population of 213 people on the island. Currently it has fewer than 150 permanent residents. Guadalupe is part of Ensenada delegación, one of the 24 delegaciones or subdivisions of Ensenada Municipality of the Mexican state of Baja California. Ensenada delegación and Chapultepec delegación together form the city of Ensenada, the municipal seat of the namesake municipality. The postal code of Guadalupe Island is 22997.

== West Camp Guadaloupe Island ==
Campo Oeste (“West Camp”, also called Campo Tepeyac, with 15 buildings) is a small community of abalone and lobster fishermen, located on the western coast, specifically on the north side of West Anchorage, a bay that provides protection from the strong winds and swells that whip the islands during winter. Generators provide electricity, and a military vessel brings 30,000 liters of fresh water. The number of fishermen varies annually depending on the fishing season. Ten months of the year the 30 families of the fishing cooperative “Abuloneros and Langosteros of Guadalupe Island” are present.

Campo Bosque was established as a temporary camp in 1999 in the cypress forest in the north. The camp houses members of the Cooperative Farming Society “Francisco Javier Maytorena, S.C. of R.L.” and removes goats from the island and sells them in the State of Sonora, with permission of Secretariat of the Environment and Natural Resources (SEMARNAT) and the support of the Secretariat of the Navy.

== The Guadaloupe Island Airport ==
Campo Pista is located at the small airport, near the center of the island (29°01′24.04″N 118°16′21.75″W, elevation:592 m, direction:05/23). Airport Isla Guadalupe (ICAO Code MMGD) has a 1,200-metre-long (3,900-foot) runway. At the end of the runway near threshold 5 is the wreckage of a Lockheed Model 18 Lodestar, which overshot the runway during landing. A North American B-25J-30/32 Mitchell, BMM-3501 (c/n 44–86712), bomber wrecked on the opposite end of the runway, after suffering serious damage in trying to take-off overloaded (29°01′36.10″N 118°16′2.98″W). Based on historical Google Earth imagery, this B-25 wreckage appears to have been removed from the location between October 2005 and June 2006.

Because Guadalupe Island is located within a biosphere reserve, anyone visiting the island must obtain a permit from the Mexican government; this means the communities on the island are closed towns.
