= Punta San Francisquito Airfield =

- IATA: none; ICAO: none

Summary
- Airport type: Public
- Location: Punta San Francisquito
- Elevation AMSL: 63 ft / 19 m
- Coordinates: 28°24′47″N 112°51′38″W
- Interactive map of Punta San Francisquito Airfield

Runways
Direction	Length		Surface
Direction	ft	m	Surface
16/34	3,965	1,208	Asphalt
15/33	3,019	920	Gravel
- DGAC: PSF

Punta San Francisquito Airfield is a public airfield located in Punta San Francisquito, Municipality of Ensenada, Baja California, Mexico, on the Gulf of California coast. The airfield is used solely for general aviation purposes. It has two runways, one with asphalt pavement and the other with packed dirt surface. Pavement (16–34) is not maintained and can be broken, packed dirt (15–33) is fully operational. Bring your own tie down ropes. Radio frequencies are 122.8 for Unicom (not always monitored) and 126.3 for Mazatlan Center. The airstrip parking is less than 200 feet from the main resort area.
