= Mas Air =

Mexican cargo airline

mas
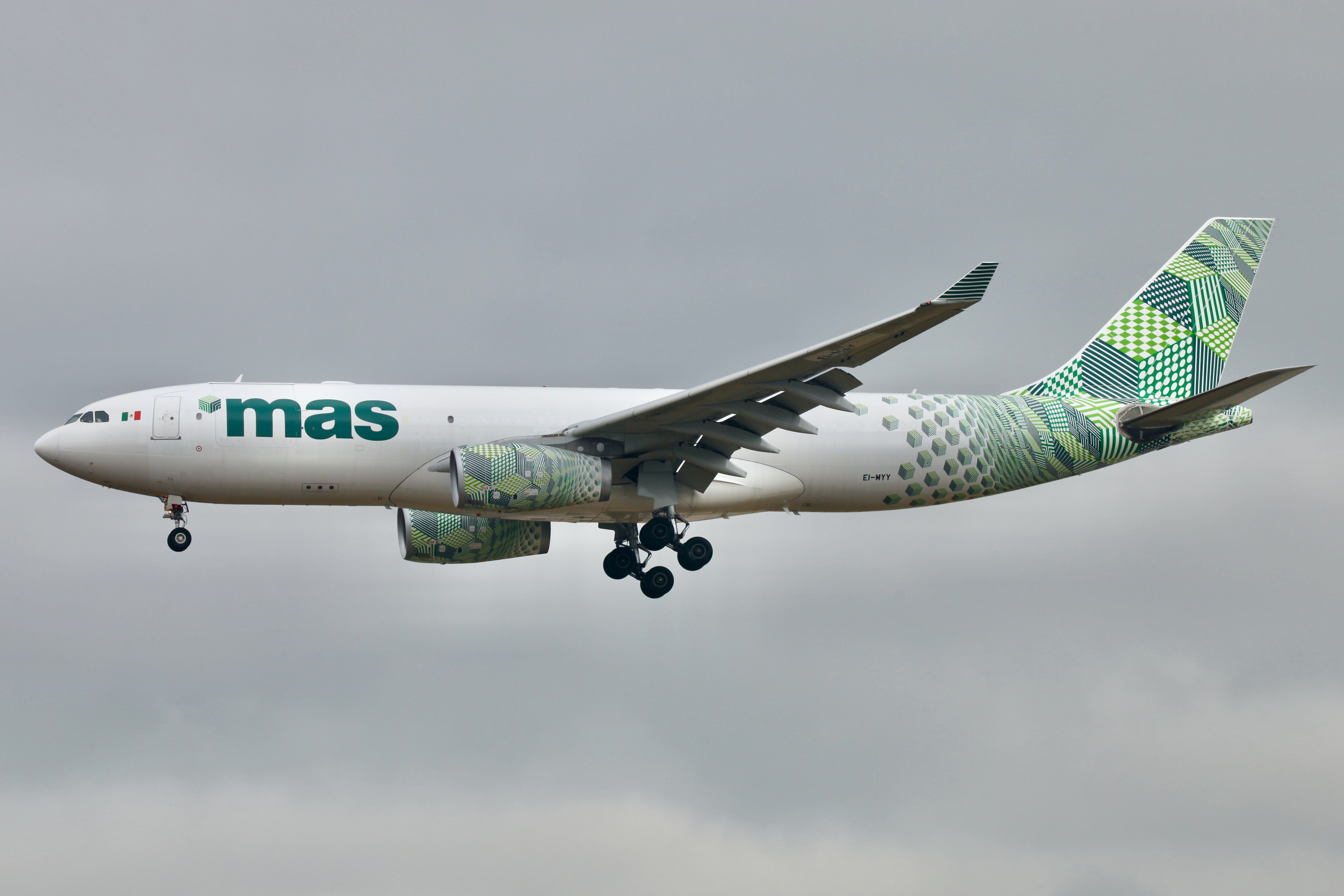
IATA	ICAO	Call sign
M7	MAA	MAS CARGA
- Founded: 1992; 34 years ago
- Commenced operations: April 1995; 31 years ago
- Hubs: Felipe Ángeles International Airport
- Secondary hubs: Los Angeles International Airport; Zaragoza Airport
- Subsidiaries: Galistair Malta (49%)
- Fleet size: 5
- Destinations: 19
- Headquarters: Mexico City, Mexico
- Key people: Robert van de Weg (CEO)
- Website: www.masair.com

mas (legally Aerotransportes Mas de Carga, S.A. de C.V. and formerly known as MasAir) is a Mexican cargo airline based in Mexico City, Mexico, specialized in the transport of air cargo utilizing wide-body aircraft. The airline operates scheduled and charter services across the Americas, Asia and Europe, from its main hub Felipe Ángeles International Airport, with secondary hubs at Los Angeles, and Zaragoza through its subsidiary Galistair Malta.

== History ==
The airline was established in 1992 and commenced operations in April 1995. Initially branded as MasAir, the carrier focused on regional cargo routes, primarily connecting Mexico with the United States and Colombia.

In December 2000, LAN Airlines (later LATAM Airlines) acquired a 25% stake in the company, which eventually grew to nearly 70%. During this period, the airline underwent significant modernization with the addition of Boeing 767 to replace the older Douglas DC-8s.

In May 2016, as part of the consolidation of LAN and TAM brands, the airline was rebranded as LATAM Cargo Mexico and the carrier became a vital link in the LATAM Cargo network.

On December 1, 2018, LATAM Airlines Group sold its stake to Discovery Americas, a Mexican private equity firm. This marked the carrier’s return to independence.

In early 2022, the airline dropped the “Air” from its name, officially rebranding as mas. The new brand identity was designed to reflect the ambitious expansion strategy. Along this new era, mas made history by becoming the first airline in the Americas to operate the Airbus A330 P2F cargo variant.

In December 2022, mas purchased a 49% stake in Maltese charter Galistair Malta, allowing the Mexican carrier to expand their global network.

== Destinations ==
mas operates the following scheduled services:

Country / region	City	Airport	Notes	Refs
Argentina	Buenos Aires	Ministro Pistarini International Airport	Seasonal	
Brazil	Campinas	Viracopos International Airport		
Chile	Santiago	Arturo Merino Benítez International Airport		
China	Wuxi	Sunan Shuofang International Airport		
China	Hangzhou	Hangzhou Xiaoshan International Airport		
Colombia	Bogotá	El Dorado International Airport		
Colombia	Medellín	José María Córdova International Airport	Seasonal	
Costa Rica	San José	Juan Santamaría International Airport		
Ecuador	Quito	Mariscal Sucre International Airport		
Guatemala	Guatemala City	La Aurora International Airport	Seasonal	
Mexico	Guadalajara	Guadalajara International Airport		
Mexico	Mexico City	Felipe Ángeles International Airport	Hub	
Panama	Panama City	Tocumen International Airport		
Peru	Lima	Jorge Chávez International Airport		
South Korea	Seoul	Incheon International Airport		
Spain	Zaragoza	Zaragoza Airport	Hub	
United States	Anchorage	Ted Stevens Anchorage International Airport		
United States	Los Angeles	Los Angeles International Airport	Hub	
United States	New York City	John F. Kennedy International Airport		

=== Interline agreements ===
- Atlas Air
- Nippon Cargo Airlines

== Fleet ==
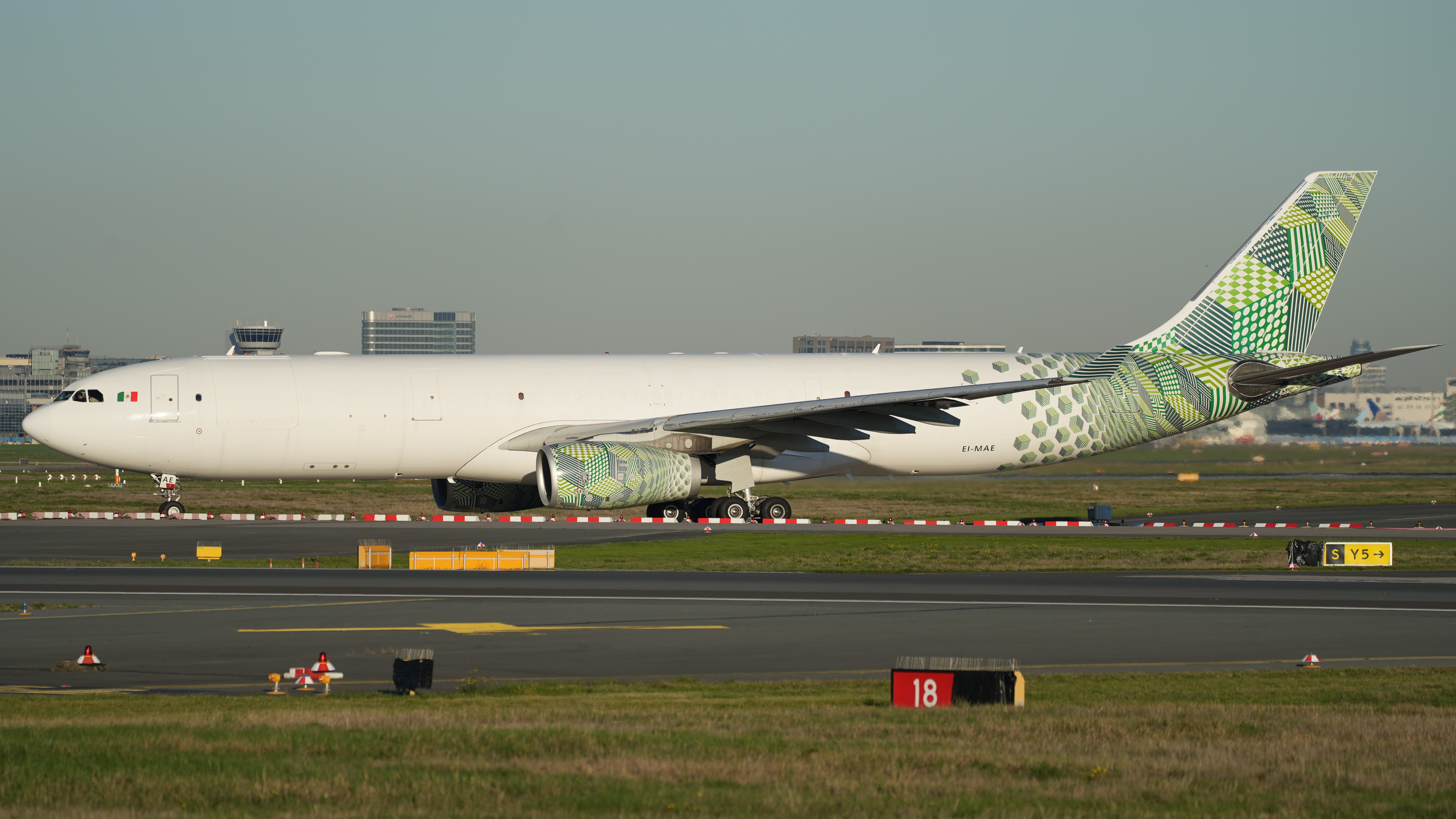
mas Airbus A330-300P2F

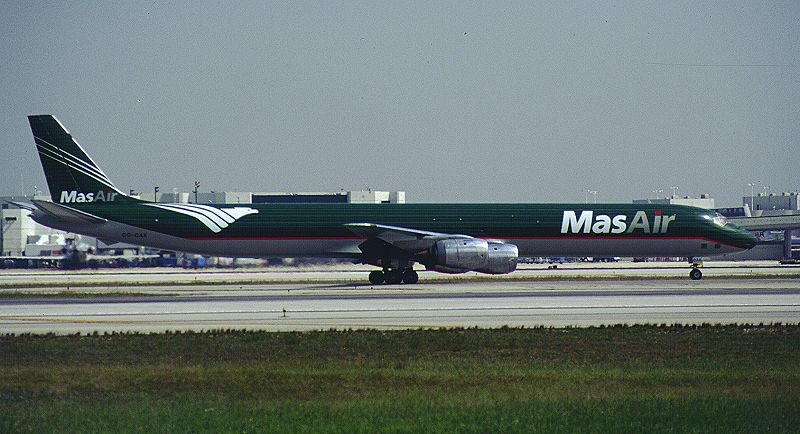
A former Douglas DC-8-71F, 1998

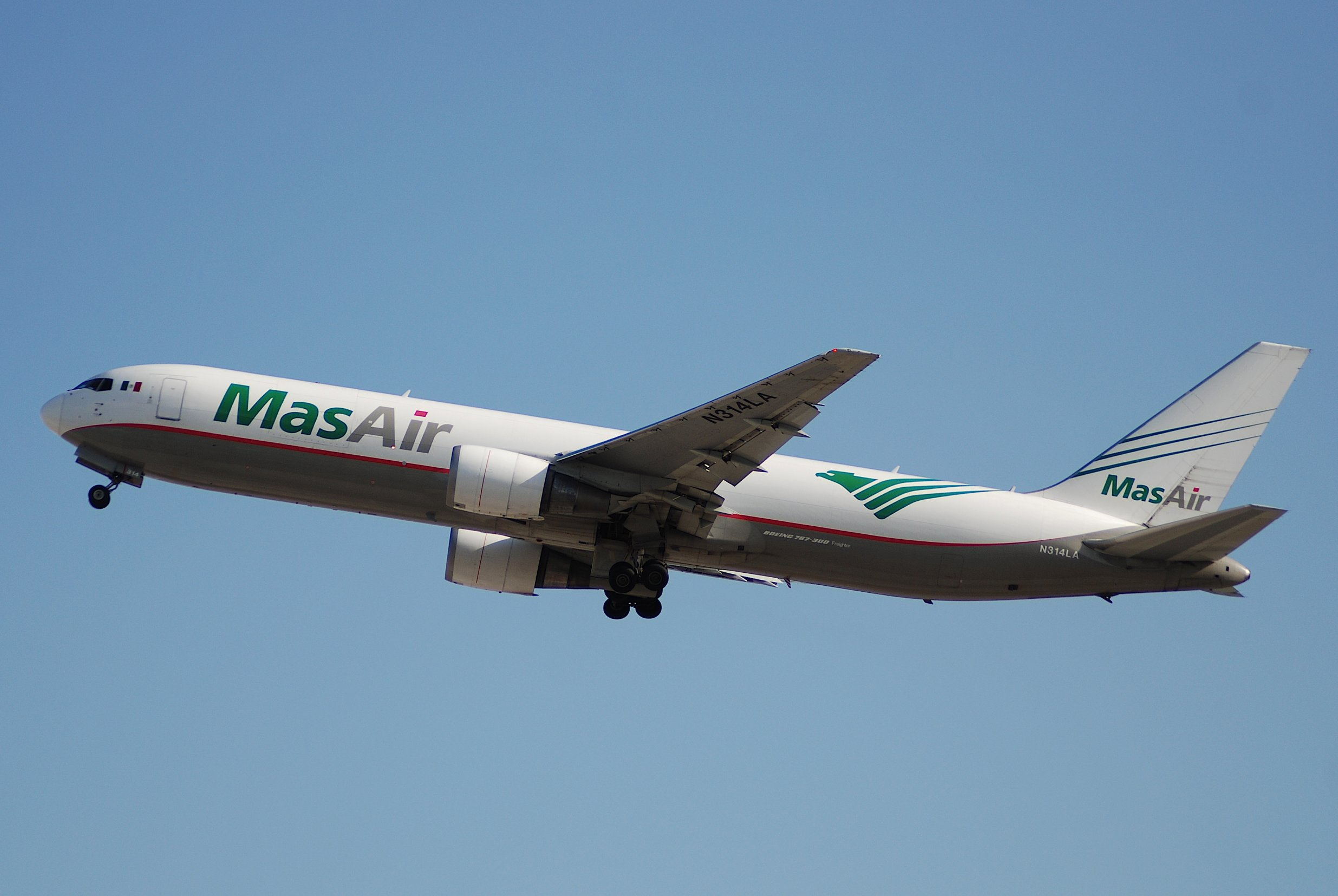
A former Boeing 767-300F, 2007

=== Current ===
As of April 2026, mas operates an all-Airbus A330 fleet composed of the following aircraft:

Aircraft	In service	Orders	Notes
Airbus A330-200P2F	2	—	
Airbus A330-300P2F	3	—	
Total	5	—	

=== Former ===
mas formerly operated the following aircraft:

Aircraft	Total	Introduced	Retired	Notes
Boeing 767-200BDSF	1	2020	2023	
Boeing 767-300F	2	2001	2022	
Boeing 767-300ER/BDSF	2	2020	2023	

== See also ==
- List of active Mexican airlines
- List of airlines of the Americas
