= Awesome Cargo =

Charter cargo airline

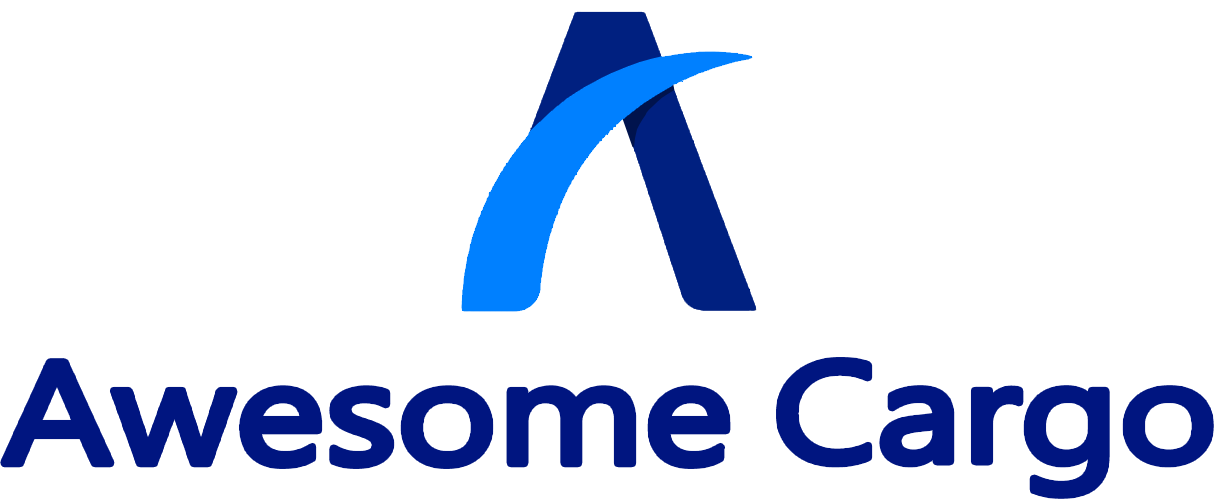

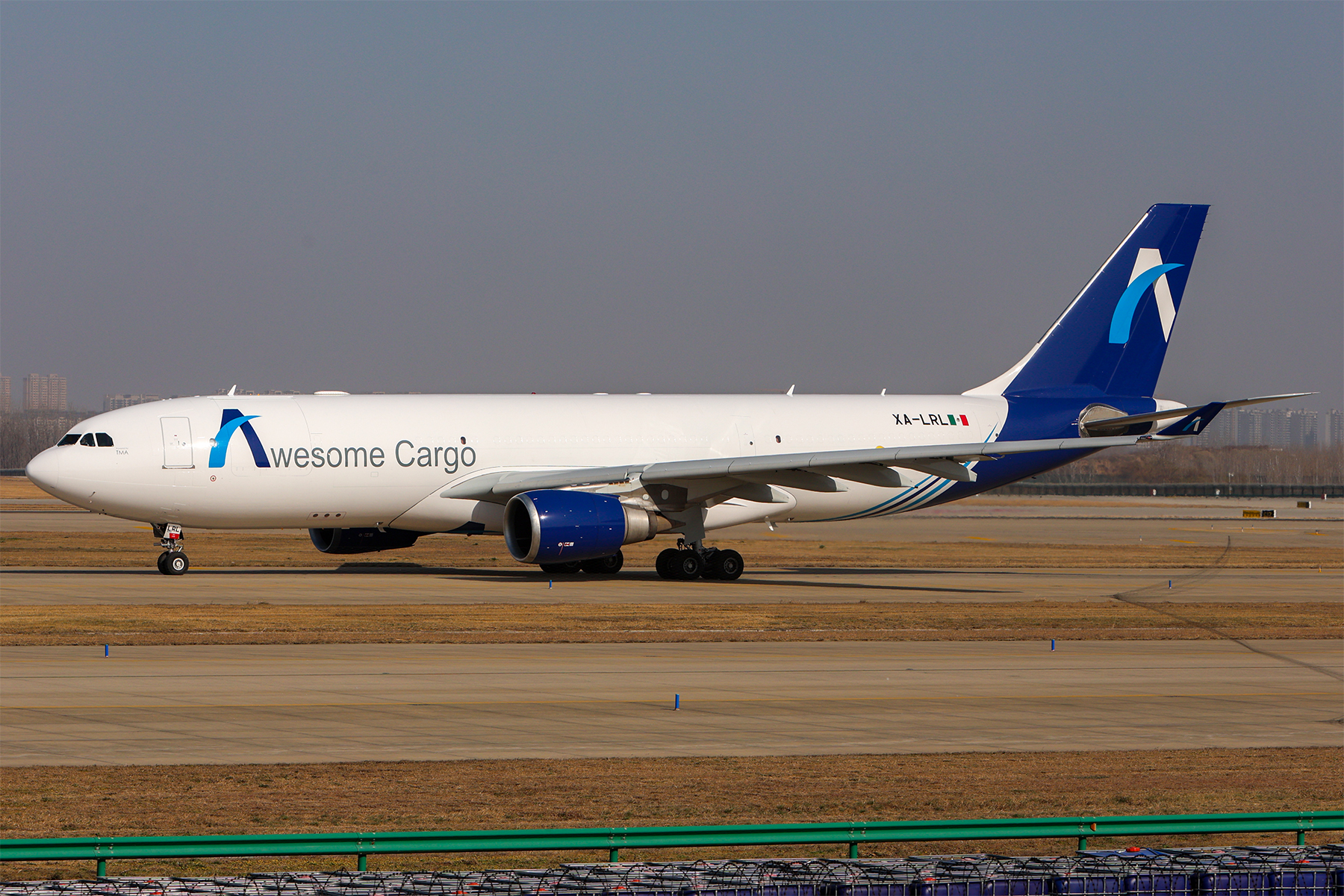
IATA	ICAO	Call sign
A7	WIN	TEME AIRLINES
- Founded: November 25, 2019; 6 years ago
- Commenced operations: December 4, 2023; 2 years ago
- Hubs: Felipe Ángeles International Airport
- Fleet size: 3
- Headquarters: Lomas de Chapultepec, Mexico City, Mexico
- Key people: Carlos Herrera (Managing Director); Luis Ramos (CEO and founder)
- Website: awesome-cargo.com

Awesome Cargo (official legal name TM Aerolíneas S.A. de C.V.) is a charter cargo airline based at Felipe Angeles International Airport.

== History ==
The airline had its inaugural flight on December 4, 2023, with an Airbus A330 P2F registered XA-LRL, being the first cargo airline operating at Santa Lucia Airport.

In 2024 the airline began looking at the Boeing 737 and US flights.

In January 2025, it began operating regular flights between Santa Lucia Airport and Zhengzhou Airport with a stopover at Los Angeles, as well as the return flight between Zhengzhou and Santa Lucia with stopovers at Seoul-Incheon and Anchorage.

== Fleet ==
As of April 2026, Awesome Cargo operates the following aircraft:

Aircraft	In service	Orders	Notes
Airbus A330-200P2F	3	—	Former Alitalia passenger aircraft.
Boeing 737-800BCF	—	2	
Total	3	2	

== See also ==
- List of airlines of Mexico
