= Punta Final Airstrip =

- IATA: none; ICAO: none

Summary
- Airport type: Public
- Location: Punta Final
- Elevation AMSL: 13 ft / 4 m
- Coordinates: 29°44′09″N 114°18′42″W
- Interactive map of Punta Final Airstrip

Runways
Direction	Length		Surface
Direction	ft	m	Surface
02/20	2,935	895	Soil

Punta Final Airstrip is a public airstrip located in Punta Final, Municipality of Ensenada, Baja California, Mexico, a little village located on the Gulf of California coast. The airstrip is used solely for general aviation purposes. The PFL code is used as identifier.
