= Rancho Magaña Airstrip =

Public airport in Baja California, Mexico

- IATA: none; ICAO: none

Summary
- Airport type: Public
- Operator: Familia Magaña
- Location: San Quintín, Baja California
- Elevation AMSL: 62 ft / 19 m
- Coordinates: 30°38′10″N 115°57′37″W
- Interactive map of Rancho Magaña Airstrip

Runways
Direction	Length		Surface
Direction	ft	m	Surface
11/29	4,343	1,323	Soil

Rancho Magaña Airstrip is a privately owned public-use dirt airstrip located North of San Quintín, Municipality of Ensenada, Baja California, Mexico, just on the East side of the Federal Highway 1. The airstrip is used solely for general aviation purposes. The MAG code is used as identifier.
