= Ejido Eréndira =

Small community in Baja California, Mexico

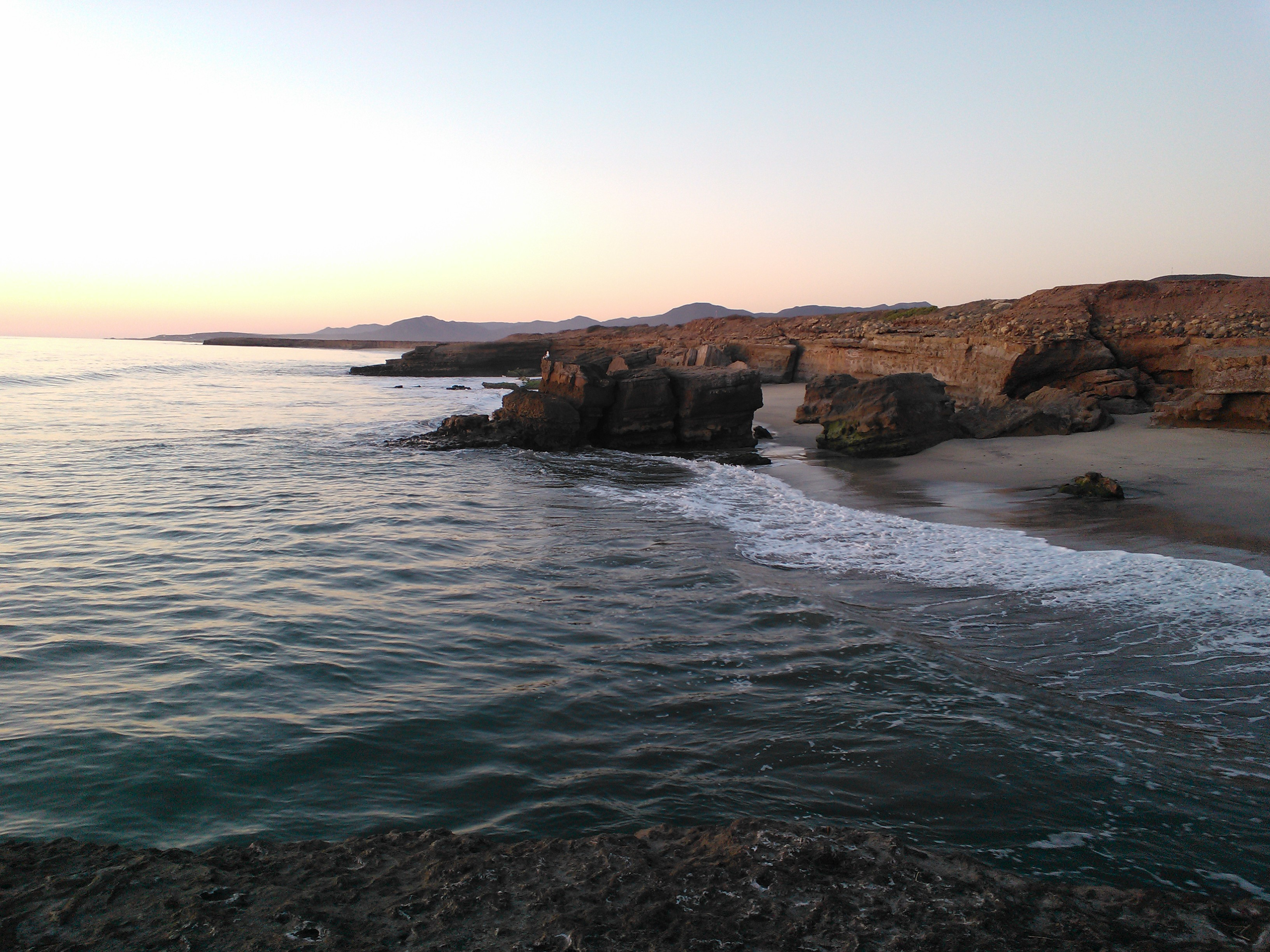
- Nickname: Eréndira
- Location in Mexico
- Coordinates: 31°16′34″N 116°22′37″W
- Country: Mexico
- State: Baja California
- Municipality: Ensenada
- Elevation: 102 ft (31 m)

Population (2010)
  - City: 1,461
  - Urban: 0
- Time zone: UTC-8 (Northwest US Pacific)
  - Summer (DST): UTC-7 (Northwest)

Ejido Eréndira is a small community located in the municipality of Ensenada in the state of Baja California. It is 100 km south of the city of Ensenada. It has a population of 1,461 people most of whom make a living by fishing.

Another approximately 1,500 seasonal residents have second homes here.

However, in spite of this Eréndira is an isolated and undeveloped beach. While it has areas with the rough, cold seas common on the Pacific side of Baja California, it also has very calm days where the Ocean is very relaxed. There are rocky outcroppings that form pools of seawater that is protected from the open ocean, and a wide array of sandy beaches. The Fishing and local surf breaks are world class. Nearby there is an area that had been used by pre-historic peoples that gathered seasonally here to collect shellfish such as clams, sea snails, mussels and other. They left a layer of shells over eight meters thick that Canadian archeologists have dated back over 10,000 years.

The first Europeans arrived here in 1542 when viceroy Antonio de Mendoza sent Juan Rodriguez Cabrillo.

Wildlife to be found in the areas, aside from shellfish, include migrating whales, dolphins, seals, pelicans, seagulls, sea anemones, limpets, sea snails and small fish, also a wide array of hawks, eagles, among others. Coyotes and an occasional bobcat can be seen in the hills that surround the area.

Eréndira has very little in the way of tourist services but there are small grocery stores and a small hotel. Many of the locals are employed in the farming and fishing sectors.

== Climate ==
Climate data for Ejido Eréndira (1951–2010)
Month	Jan	Feb	Mar	Apr	May	Jun	Jul	Aug	Sep	Oct	Nov	Dec	Year
Record high °C (°F)	31.0 (87.8)	30.0 (86.0)	32.0 (89.6)	30.0 (86.0)	31.0 (87.8)	33.0 (91.4)	37.0 (98.6)	37.0 (98.6)	38.0 (100.4)	38.0 (100.4)	36.0 (96.8)	36.0 (96.8)	38.0 (100.4)
Mean daily maximum °C (°F)	19.2 (66.6)	18.8 (65.8)	19.0 (66.2)	19.4 (66.9)	19.3 (66.7)	21.3 (70.3)	23.8 (74.8)	24.0 (75.2)	24.3 (75.7)	22.9 (73.2)	21.6 (70.9)	19.1 (66.4)	21.1 (70.0)
Daily mean °C (°F)	13.1 (55.6)	13.0 (55.4)	13.3 (55.9)	13.8 (56.8)	14.7 (58.5)	16.2 (61.2)	19.2 (66.6)	19.4 (66.9)	19.1 (66.4)	17.0 (62.6)	14.9 (58.8)	12.9 (55.2)	15.6 (60.1)
Mean daily minimum °C (°F)	7.0 (44.6)	7.3 (45.1)	7.7 (45.9)	8.2 (46.8)	10.0 (50.0)	11.0 (51.8)	14.6 (58.3)	14.8 (58.6)	13.9 (57.0)	11.1 (52.0)	8.2 (46.8)	6.7 (44.1)	10.0 (50.0)
Record low °C (°F)	−2.0 (28.4)	−4.0 (24.8)	2.0 (35.6)	2.0 (35.6)	4.0 (39.2)	5.0 (41.0)	6.0 (42.8)	7.0 (44.6)	6.0 (42.8)	3.0 (37.4)	1.0 (33.8)	−3.0 (26.6)	−4.0 (24.8)
Average precipitation mm (inches)	38.5 (1.52)	45.7 (1.80)	50.0 (1.97)	11.2 (0.44)	2.4 (0.09)	1.0 (0.04)	0.3 (0.01)	2.5 (0.10)	5.1 (0.20)	4.6 (0.18)	27.2 (1.07)	28.8 (1.13)	217.3 (8.56)
Average precipitation days (≥ 0.1 mm)	3.9	3.3	5.3	2.0	0.4	0.3	0.1	0.4	0.7	0.9	1.9	3.1	22.3
Source: Servicio Meteorologico Nacional
