= Arturo Ortega Olive =

Mexican businessman

Arturo Ortega Olive is a Mexican businessman and general director of Aerolíneas Ejecutivas, which he founded in 1968.

== Philanthropy ==
Olive has supported environmental preservation efforts in Mexico.
