= El Buen Pastor Airstrip =

- IATA: none; ICAO: none

Summary
- Airport type: Public
- Operator: Mexican Medical Ministries
- Location: San Quintín, Baja California
- Elevation AMSL: 125 ft / 38 m
- Coordinates: 30°34′16″N 115°55′16″W
- Interactive map of El Buen Pastor Airstrip

Runways
Direction	Length		Surface
Direction	ft	m	Surface
10/28	2,059	627	Soil

El Buen Pastor Airstrip is a public dirt airstrip located in San Quintín, Municipality of Ensenada, Baja California, Mexico, near the Federal Highway 1. The airstrip is part of a medical clinic operated by the Mexican Medical Ministries, an interdenominational non-profit organization dedicated to providing low cost health care. The airstrip is used solely for general aviation purposes. The EBP code is used as identifier.

This air strip is no longer in service.
