= Alfonsina (given name) =

Alfonsina is a feminine given name. It is the feminine counterpart of the masculine name Alfonso, which in turn is the Latin form of Alphons.

== People ==
- Alfonsina Orsini (1472–1520), Regent of Florence
- Alfonsina Strada (1891–1959), Italian cyclist
- Alfonsina Storni (1892–1938), Argentine poet
- Alfonsina Maldonado (born 1984), Uruguayan agricultural technician, equestrian and lecturer

== See also ==
- Alfonsina (disambiguation)
- Alphons
