= Rancho Santa Inés Airstrip =

- IATA: none; ICAO: MM23; LID: SIN

Summary
- Airport type: Public
- Operator: N/A
- Location: Cataviña, Mexico
- Elevation AMSL: 1,865 ft / 568 m
- Coordinates: 29°43′35″N 114°42′03″W

Map
- Location of the airport in Mexico

Runways
Direction	Length		Surface
Direction	ft	m	Surface
07/25	3,682	1,122	Soil

Rancho Santa Inés Airstrip (ICAO: MM23), also known as Cataviña Airstrip, is a public airstrip located South of Cataviña, Municipality of Ensenada, Baja California, Mexico, just in the middle of the Cataviña Desert National Reserve. The airfield is used solely for general aviation purposes. The ranch offers rooms and bunkhouse accommodations for the night as well as food. The ruins of Mission Santa Maria are 23 km (14 mi) further east on a poorly maintained dirt road.
