= Punta Colonet =

Town in Baja California, Mexico

Punta Colonet Chuwílo Ksaay
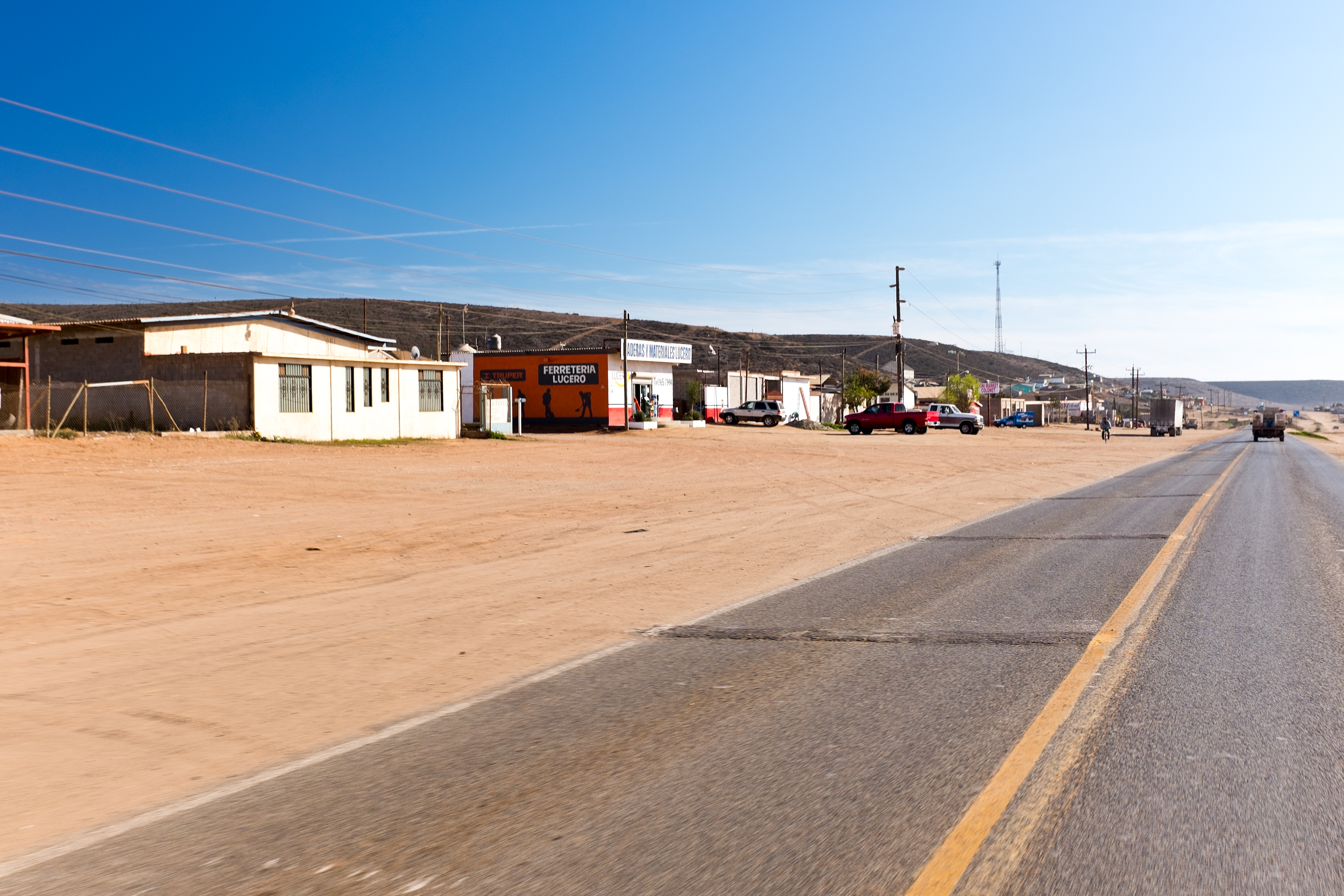

- Location in Mexico Punta Colonet (Mexico)
- Coordinates: 31°04′24″N 116°12′28″W
- Country: Mexico
- State: Baja California
- Municipality: Ensenada
- Elevation: 157 ft (48 m)

Population (2010)
  - Total: 3,752
- Time zone: UTC-8 (Northwest US Pacific)
  - Summer (DST): UTC-7 (Northwest)

Punta Colonet (Chuwílo Ksaay (dry arroyo) in the Kiliwa language) is a town located in Ensenada Municipality, Baja California, Mexico. Located 115 km (71 mi) south of the city of Ensenada, the community is located in an agriculturally productive region of Baja California spurred on by its location along Mexican Federal Highway 1 and proximity to agricultural markets in the United States.

== Name origin ==
The headland, nearby town, and adjacent bay are reputedly named after Captain James Colnett, a British sea captain who explored this section of the Pacific coast in the late 18th century. There has been tremendous growth in the region over the last five years.

== Geography ==
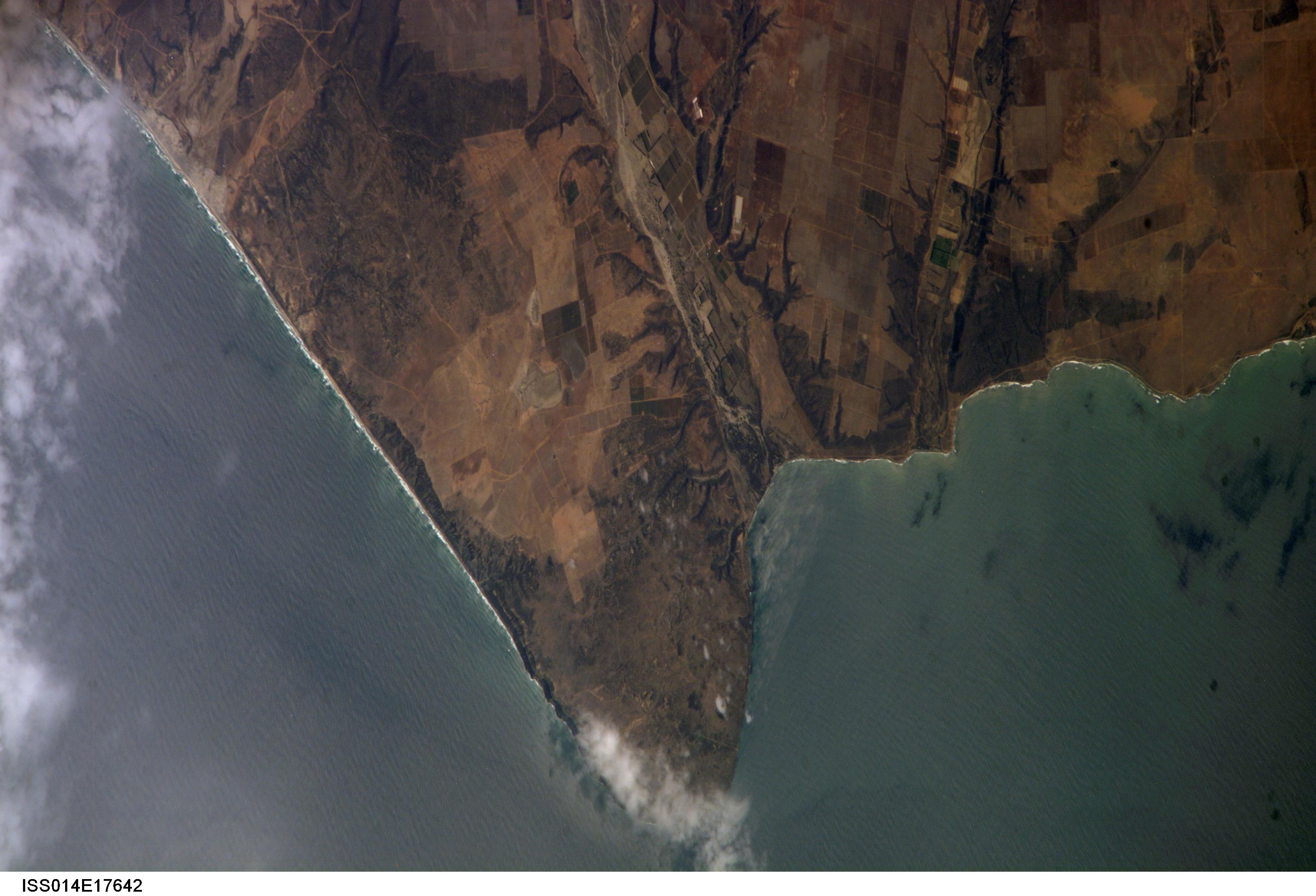
Punta Colonet imaged from the ISS

Punta Colonet is located along the southeastern banks of Arroyo Colonet. The communities of Ejido México (a.k.a. Ejido Punta Colonet) and Ejido 27 de Enero are located opposite of Arroyo Colonet from Punta Colonet. The population was 3,278 in the 2010 Census for Ejido Colonet, with 27 de Enero home to 474 people, together having a population of 3,752 as of 2010.

The town of Punta Colonet is located about 15 km (9.3 mi) northeast of Punta Colonet, a large headland covered in gently rolling hills and xeric shrubland. The southwestern tip of the headland defines the southern extent of the Southern California Bight, which extends 545 km (339 mi) northwest to Point Conception in California.

== History ==
During Prohibition, the Canadian rum-runner Malahat allegedly anchored off Cape Colnett as a mother ship, providing liquor which was smuggled north to San Diego. In 1929, Emmanuel Rougier, a French priest and businessman in Tahiti, bought the schooner Marechal Foch from American author Zane Grey. Captain Fred Klebingat, captain of the ship while Grey owned it, stated that Rougier used the ship as a rum-runner, taking alcohol from Tahiti to Cape Colnett.

== Proposed port ==
There is a proposal to turn the bay (Bahía Colonet) near Punta Colonet, a desolate and sparsely inhabited inlet, into a multibillion-dollar deep water mega-container port able to handle next-generation vessels. The mega-port will cover 3,000 hectares which is more than 7,000 acres, making it as large as the U.S. ports of Los Angeles and Long Beach combined. The projected multimodal maritime center would make Punta Colonet the largest port in Mexico and the third-largest in the world, after Singapore and Hong Kong. The project will require a new power plant and a desalination plant. The port will also require a 300-kilometre-plus (190 mi) rail line from the Port to reach the United States border and an intermodal facility.

On August 17, 2009, Mexico Transportation and Communications Minister Juan Molinar Horcasitas announced the project will move ahead, and that a new timetable would soon be issued. On October 8, 2009, Mexico’s Secretary of Communications and Transport Juan Francisco Molinar Horcasitas said the project would start with a reduced near-term plan to handle one million containers (TEUs) per year, a figure "viable in light of declining Pacific ship traffic". This is down from the original target of 2 million/year. He also said that bids will be accepted in the range of $1–3 billion, and he reiterated that four groups of companies are expected to submit construction-and-operation bids.

On December 14, 2009, after two years of work and expenditure of $1 million, the Mexican government issued urban and port development plans for the coming mega-port at Punta Colonet. From today’s population of 9,000, Punta Colonet will grow to 48,000 within five years, and 230,000 by 2040, according to the planning document issued by the Urban Development Program of the Center for Population and the City Planning Institute of Ensenada.

As of 2022, the port had not been constructed.

=== Rationale ===
If the port is not built, containers may have to be shipped in the port at Lázaro Cárdenas, Michoacán where expansion is currently underway to increase volumes, due to congestion at the ports of Los Angeles, Long Beach, and Oakland, which is even farther, unless expansion plans in US ports are aggressive enough.

Lázaro Cárdenas is used now on a small scale as a shipping gateway to interior US cities such as Chicago, Kansas City, and Houston (Houston, TX, is not an inland city; it is a port city connected to the Gulf of Mexico), as it is closer to the heart of the continent than Los Angeles. Puerto Colonet on the other hand would be closer to fast growing Arizona, Nevada and other mountain states and could serve as a bypass to the congested Los Angeles region with a comparable distance to those markets, and it would be over a thousand kilometers closer than the port at Lázaro. Currently, ships often have to wait a week to unload in the Los Angeles region, and large truck congestion is a big problem on the Interstate 710 and other connecting highways in the LA Basin. The current situation also causes a problem even for Los Angeles businesses as their cargos on ships are unloaded by time of arrival not proximity of destination.

The port of Guaymas which has an already existing rail and four-lane highway connection to the interior and United States is also seeking to increase its traffic in containers and bulk cargo but further development of Guaymas will not preclude expansion at Lazaro Cardenas or Punta Colonet.

Thus, ports and jobs could be kept in the US, but at a much higher overall cost, as much of California's infrastructure is already maxed out.

The mega-port also would be expected to be a boon to the Baja California regional economy, providing several hundred thousand jobs directly or indirectly. A city nearby will need to be built, and highways and railways upgraded, providing vast economic growth potential.

=== Proponents ===
A Los Angeles firm, representing Chinese and Korean concerns, was lobbying the Mexican government to be granted permission to build the multibillion-dollar port in the agricultural area of Punta Colonet, 150 miles (240 km) south of Tijuana, to handle between 1.5 million twenty-foot equivalent units (TEU) and 6 million TEU of cargo. A mineral rights lobby had a different plan to develop the area as an offshore mining area. However, the mineral rights lobby was bypassed by the Mexican federal government, and the port was planned for bidding and obtained the backing of former President Vicente Fox of the PAN. There is also another Mexican mining company with Canadian backing which holds rights to an interior deposit of ilmenite and magnetite nearby.

Los Angeles area ports, likewise, also generally supported the plan as a congestion relief measure. When the ports of Los Angeles and Long Beach become congested shipments into the city are not given preference in scheduling unloading over those further inland. Businesses located in Los Angeles were waiting as long as a week for a ship already offshore within sight of California with their cargo to unload.

Ernesto Ruffo Appel, Baja California's former PAN governor and Mexico's ex-border czar, and Ensenada businessman Roberto Curiel Amaya teamed-up to bid on the project. They claimed then that investors from Asia and Europe were committed to Punta Colonet, but declined to divulge their investors identities.

Their plan is to build 18 berths at the port capable of processing 850,000 TEU of containerized cargo annually. The consortium also planned to combine the project with an air-freight airport north of Ensenada. It was reported that instead of running a rail line 180 miles (290 km) across the Baja California peninsula to and then connect the state capital Mexicali and Yuma, Arizona, as the federal plan envisioned, the defunct consortium of HPH/UP ostensibly would have built a line to Ciudad Juárez in the state of Chihuahua where rail crossings into the United States already exist. But certainly any such rail line necessarily would run through or near Mexicali, the capital city of the state of Baja California for any tie-in with the US transcontinental rail system.

=== Concerns ===
==== Environmental ====
One US environmentalist was quoted as saying of the project, “This is just another case of exporting California’s dirty environmental problems to the pristine coastline of Baja California. This is one of the last places we can preserve the beauty that once was the entire west coast.”

Developers argue that it makes sense to place a major mega-port and intermodal rail freight facility in a less populated area such as Punta Colonet. Appropriate environmental safeguards need to be implemented under NAFTA regulations. Among the environmental investment required at Los Angeles ports are 80% less-polluting ultra-low sulfur diesel trucks, plus port electricity so waiting ships don't have to burn fuel oil. These things were said not to be required in Mexico. But Mexico indeed does has environmental safeguards which are now enforced. Environmentalists are also concerned with pollution from port operation of ships, trucks, and locomotives and the discharge of sewage, toxic paint, and invasive species discharged by the boats into the harbor. These concerns are real. Although these are actual truths many changes are being made at this time by many transportation companies such as Union Pacific railroad which is constructing a 90 million dollar solution to the Long Beach/Los Angeles problem of pollution as an inland port where the trucking industry will be reduced for access to the direct port movement of containers unless they wish the customer to be charged a fee for pick up or delivery of the container at the port where the train is exempt from the charge.

==== Ejidos ====
Even though the development of the port was announced and many meetings were held with numerous foreign and domestic business executives, the nearby ejidos, or small communally-owned farming communities, that own the coastal land upon which the port will be built never were contacted. After banding together with a large property owner, those small landowners gained access to the planning and political processes so that their concerns could be heard and represented by the federal government. At this time the small land owners group have the largest say how the land will be used in relation to the needs of the land owners represented by Jesus Lara. Mr. Lara has family ties in this area for decades and is a southern California businessman with ties to the trucking industry, with a point of view very congruent to the landowners in the area.

==== Jobs ====
Also, some US citizens are concerned about loss of jobs in favor of cheaper Mexican labor. Where unions do not have a stronghold to direct employees terms and limits with employers may be the key to this project in relation to California-based port operations success. A new view of Mexican labor may be apparent with Punta Colonet.

==== Mining ====
Before the port project was started, the federal Economy Secretariat issued an operating concession to Grupo Minero Lobos, to permit mining of titanium and other metals from the sea bed in most of the bay. The concession covers 30,000 hectares - 45 kilometers of coastline and five kilometers into the sea, including the 3,000 hectares designated to become Puerto Colonet. Grupo Minero Lobos believes that the mining concession automatically gives them the concession for the new port. The Mexican federal government opposes this because the port would lose its competitiveness.

Within the next decade this port may become the largest investment ever made in Mexico. It is likely that the project is going ahead regardless of the legal situation and the withdrawal of HPH and UP. The mining project will need the port as well. The two projects should be able to work together and prosper.

==== Astronomy ====
The nearby National Astronomical Observatory in the Sierra San Pedro Mártir, already one of the best viewing sites in the world, is already being affected by the light emissions of cities as far as Tijuana. The light requirements of a port as large as the proposed Punta Colonet would bring even more light pollution to the area and basically ruin the observatory.

==== Monopoly ownership ====
The Chinese company Hutchison Whampoa that had proposed to build Puerto Colonet is owned by Chinese billionaire Li Ka-Shing, whose company controls 35 major ports in the world including the four most important ports in Mexico. There was a concern about the near monopoly ownership of North American ports in the event of a conflict with China.

== See also ==
- Ensenada, Baja California
- Ensenada (municipality)
- Punta Banda
