= Maneadero =

Maneadero Maneadero
- Town
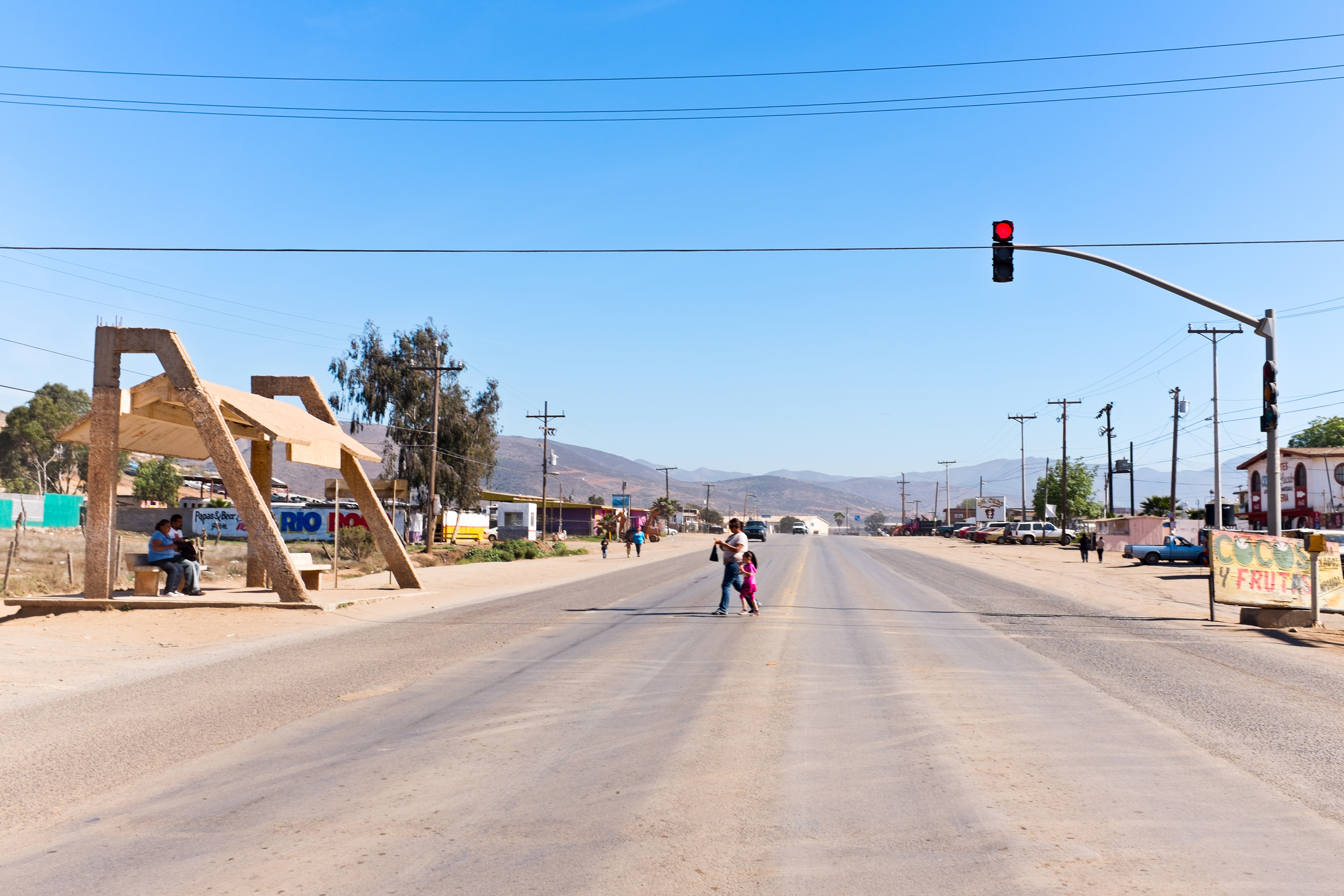

- Location of Maneadero in Mexico Maneadero (Mexico)
- Coordinates: 31°47′45″N 116°35′28″W
- Country: Mexico
- State: Baja California
- Municipality: Ensenada
- Elevation: 10 m (33 ft)

Population (2020)
  - Total: 31,006
- Time zone: UTC-8 (PST)
  - Summer (DST): UTC-7 (PDT)
- Postal code: 22790
- Calling Code: 646

Maneadero is a town in the Ensenada Municipality of Baja California, Mexico, located about eight kilometers south of the city of Ensenada. The town is very much agriculturally oriented, and livestock makes up a fair amount of the economy. The town was created by an agrarian reform, which granted agricultural land to the people who lived there.
