= Alfonsín (disambiguation) =

Raúl Alfonsín (1927–2009), was the former President of Argentina.

Alfonsín may also refer to:

- Ricardo Alfonsín (born 1953), politician and son of the former President of Argentina
- Alfonsín (footballer) (born 1951), Spanish footballer and football manager

== See also ==
- Alfonsina (disambiguation)
- Alfonsine, Italian comune
- Alfonsino, species of fish
- Alfonsine tables, astronomical table
