= Muñoz Airstrip =

- IATA: none; ICAO: none

Summary
- Airport type: Private
- Location: Bahía de los Ángeles
- Elevation AMSL: 32 ft / 9 m
- Coordinates: 28°53′29″N 113°31′43″W
- Interactive map of Muñoz Airstrip

Runways
Direction	Length		Surface
Direction	ft	m	Surface
01/19	3,375	1,028	Soil

Muñoz Airstrip was a dirt airstrip located South of Bahía de los Ángeles, Municipality of Ensenada, Baja California, Mexico, a town located on the Gulf of California coast. The HLM code was used as identifier.

== See also ==
- Bahía de los Ángeles
- Baja California
