= Aviesa =

Mexican airline

Aviesa S.A de C.V is a charter airline of Mexico. Its services are FBO, ACMI, handling, aircraft lease and sale, air taxi, VIP charters, aircraft management, air ambulance, cargo, aircraft repair and support for commercial and private aviation. Founded in 1986 (40 years ago) by Grupo Hermanos Abed (GHA), the airline was grounded in 1994 after the company's demise. The airline was reborn the next year as an independent entity and in 2002 was acquired by Asclepiodoto Abed, the former director of GHA. It was under their control until October 2008, when Abed died (presumably from SCLC): after his death, Aviesa was converted into a 100% individual company. Aviesa's base of operations is located at Toluca Airport.

== See also ==
- List of active mexican airlines
- Lists of airlines
