= Port of Lázaro Cárdenas =

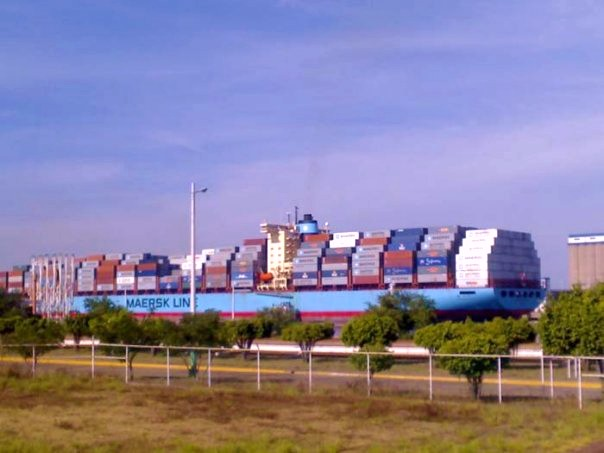
- Container ship in port.
- Interactive map of Port of Lázaro Cárdenas
- Location within Mexico

Location
- Country: Mexico
- Location: Lázaro Cárdenas, Michoacán
- Coordinates: 17°55′37″N 102°10′08″W
- UN/LOCODE: MXLZC

Details
- Owned by: Port Authority of Lázaro Cárdenas
- Type of Harbor: Natural/Artificial
- Size of harbour: 160 ha (0.62 sq mi)
- Land area: 25 ha (0.097 sq mi)
- Size: 185 ha (0.71 sq mi)
- No. of berths: 15
- No. of wharfs: 22

Statistics
- Vessel arrivals: 1,522 vessels (2012)
- Annual cargo tonnage: 30,671,996 tonnes (2012)
- Annual container volume: 1,242,777 TEU's (2012)
- Website www.puertolazarocardenas.com.mx/plc25

The Port of Lázaro Cárdenas (Spanish: [ˈlasaɾo ˈkaɾðenas]) is the largest Mexican seaport and one of the largest seaports in the Pacific Ocean basin, with an annual traffic capacity of around 25 million tonnes of cargo and 2,200,000 TEU.

In November 2003, the Mexican Navy seized the port from criminal gangs.

== Description ==
Lázaro Cárdenas is home to a deep-water seaport that handles container, dry bulk, and liquid cargo. The port currently has one container terminal, which handled 1.24 million TEU in 2012, and has a total capacity of 2.2 million TEU annually. APMT has plans to build an additional container terminal that would bring the port's capacity to 3.4 million TEU in 2015 and 6.5 million TEU in 2020. Cargo moves to and from the port by road and rail equally, with rail service provided exclusively by Canadian Pacific Kansas City. The port is expected to become a major container facility due to congestion at the U.S. ports of Los Angeles and Long Beach and its relative proximity to major cities such as Chicago, Kansas City, and Houston. In preparation for the port's increased capacity, railway and highway infrastructure running north–south through the center of Mexico has been upgraded in recent years to handle the anticipated increase in volume of goods bound for the United States using this transportation corridor. If a proposed government-backed Pacific port is built at Punta Colonet, Baja California, goods flowing to U.S. states like Arizona and Nevada could bypass the congested Los Angeles region with closer access to those markets, providing increased competition with Lázaro Cárdenas.

Lázaro Cárdenas is the terminus of the Salamanca-Lazaro Cardenas gas pipeline.

== Statistics ==
In 2012, the Port of Lázaro Cárdenas handled 30,671,996 tonnes of cargo and 1,242,777 TEU's, making the busiest cargo port in Mexico and one of the largest container ports in the country.

General statistics between 2001 - 2007
Year	2004	2005	2006	2007	2008
RoRo (nr of automobiles)	0	24,923	88,669	114,276	112,457
Liquid bulk^{*}	932,000	919,000	1,281,000	1,841,000	2,275,000
Dry bulk^{*}	10,165,000	12,940,000	13,895,000	11,234,000	5,804,000
Break bulk^{*}	2,910,000	2,785,000	2,587,000	2,719,000	1,809,000
Containers (TEU's)	43,445	132,479	160,696	270,240	524,791
Containers^{*}	323,000	1,030,000	1,159,000	1,544,000	4,240,000
Total^{*}'	14,330,000	17,674,000	18,992,000	17,693,000	20,860,647

* figures in tonnes

== Terminals ==
The port of Lázaro Cárdenas has both public and private terminals specialised in:

Public terminals

- Grain terminal: 15,064 m^{2} (162,150 sq ft)
- Multi use terminals: 62,889 m^{2} (676,930 sq ft)
- Container terminals: 634,120 m^{2} (6,825,600 sq ft)

Private terminals

- Mineral terminal: 60,328 m^{2} (649,370 sq ft)
- Fluid terminal: 1,783,413 m^{2} (19,196,500 sq ft)
- Coal terminal: 1,163,408 m^{2} (12,522,820 sq ft)
- Fertilizer terminal: 1,487,381 m^{2} (16,010,040 sq ft)
