= Aerolíneas Ejecutivas =

Mexican airline

IATA	ICAO	Call sign
-	LET	MEXALE
- Founded: 1968; 58 years ago
- AOC #: ER2F804K
- Hubs: Toluca International Airport
- Fleet size: 27
- Headquarters: Toluca, Mexico
- Key people: Arturo Ortega Olive
- Employees: 530 (2016)
- Website: http://www.aerolineasejecutivas.com/

Aerolíneas Ejecutivas S.A de C.V is an air charter operator. It was founded in 1968 by Arturo Ortega Olive, and as of April 2015, it operates a fleet of 27 aircraft. In 2016, it had 530 employees and flew roughly 15,000 hours per year.

== See also ==
- List of active mexican airlines
- Lists of airlines
