= El Pedregal Airstrip =

- IATA: none; ICAO: none

Summary
- Airport type: Private
- Serves: West San Quintin Bay, San Quintin, Pedrigal private homeowners community
- Location: San Quintín, Baja California
- Elevation AMSL: 3 m (9.8 ft)
- Coordinates: 30°27′36″N 115°57′46″W
- Interactive map of El Pedregal Airstrip

Runways
Direction	Length		Surface
Direction	m	ft	Surface
27/09	442	1,800' uphill slightly from bay to end to west	Soil
- There is a long runup and ground roll slab at RWY 27 of concrete some 100 ft long to keep rocks from nicking prop and stabilator until airspeed sufficient. TO West ALWAYS unless wind is reversed. Predominant onshore flow of 10-20Kts out of the West.

El Pedregal Airstrip is a private dirt airstrip located South West of San Quintín, Municipality of Ensenada, Baja California, Mexico, just on the headland of the San Quintín Bay. The airstrip is used solely for general aviation purposes.
