= Alfonsina's Airstrip =

- IATA: none; ICAO: none

Summary
- Airport type: Public
- Operator: Alfonsina's Resort
- Location: San Luis Gonzaga, Baja California
- Elevation AMSL: 4 ft / 1 m
- Coordinates: 29°48′14″N 114°23′49″W
- Interactive map of Alfonsina's Airstrip

Runways
Direction	Length		Surface
Direction	ft	m	Surface
01/19	2,375	723	Soil

Alfonsina's Airstrip (IATA: N/A) is the privately owned public-use dirt airstrip of "Alfonsina's Resort", located in San Luis Gonzaga, Municipality of Ensenada, Baja California, Mexico, on the San Luis Gonzaga Bay located on the Gulf of California coast. The runway is constructed on a narrow sandpit, so it may be partially submerged during high tides (new or full moon).
