= Aeromaan =

Mexican airline

Aeromaan SA de CV is a Mexican airline based in San Luis Potosí, San Luis Potosí. Aeromaan operates charter, cargo, taxi and executive flights, as well as repairs and ACMI.

== History ==
The airline was established in 2002 (24 years ago) by a group of investors and began operations in June 2002 (24 years ago). Aeromaan was under the direction of 2695731 Canada Inc., a Canadian group of general aviation, until March 2008, when the group went out of business due to the economic state. Aeromaan investments was transferred to K7 Investments SA de CV.

== See also ==
- List of active mexican airlines
- Lists of airlines
