= Rancho San José Airstrip =

- IATA: none; ICAO: none

Summary
- Airport type: Private
- Operator: Meling Family
- Location: Rancho San José
- Elevation AMSL: 2,123 ft (647 m)
- Coordinates: 30°58′30″N 115°44′17″W
- Interactive map of Rancho San José Airstrip

Runways
Direction	Length		Surface
Direction	ft	m	Surface
03/21	2,940	896	Soil

Rancho San José Airstrip is a private dirt airstrip located in Rancho San José, better known as Meling Ranch, Municipality of Ensenada, Baja California, Mexico, 32 miles to the east of Federal Highway 1, near the West side of the San Pedro Mártir Mountain Range. The airstrip is operated by the Meling Family, which also run the Guest Ranch. The airstrip is used solely for general aviation purposes.
