= Rancho Grande Airstrip =

- IATA: none; ICAO: none

Summary
- Airport type: Public
- Operator: N/A
- Location: San Luis Gonzaga, Baja California
- Elevation AMSL: 21 ft / 6 m
- Coordinates: 29°47′34″N 114°24′07″W
- Interactive map of Rancho Grande Airstrip

Runways
Direction	Length		Surface
Direction	ft	m	Surface
08/26	5,485	1,671	Soil
04/22	3,352	1,029	Soil

Rancho Grande Airfield (IATA: N/A) is a privately owned public-use airfield located in San Luis Gonzaga, Municipality of Ensenada, Baja California, Mexico, on the San Luis Gonzaga Bay located on the Gulf of California coast. The airfield is used solely for general aviation purposes. It has two dirt runways.
