= San Quintín Military Airstrip =

San Quintín Airport
- IATA: SNQ; ICAO: none

Summary
- Airport type: Military
- Operator: Secretaría de la Defensa Nacional
- Location: San Quintín, Baja California
- Elevation AMSL: 52 ft / 15 m
- Coordinates: 30°31′42″N 115°56′48″W
- Interactive map of San Quintín Airport

Runways
Direction	Length		Surface
Direction	ft	m	Surface
12/30	2,374	723	Asphalt

San Quintín Military Airstrip (IATA: SNQ) is the military airstrip located at Military Camp Number 2-D, located in San Quintín, Municipality of Ensenada, Baja California, Mexico, in the San Quintín Valley. The airport is handled by the Mexican Army and is used solely for military aviation purposes.
