= Punta San Carlos =

- Village
- Location in Mexico
- Coordinates: 29°37′10″N 115°30′12″W
- Country: Mexico
- State: Baja California
- Municipality: Ensenada
- Elevation: 0 ft (0 m)
- Time zone: UTC-8 (Northwest US Pacific)
  - Summer (DST): UTC-7 (Northwest)

Punta San Carlos is a small fishing village on the west coast of the state of Baja California just off Highway 1, about 80 km south of El Rosario on a dirt track. It is part of the Municipio of Ensenada. The area has become a popular Windsurfing and Kitesurfing destination.
