= San Quintín, Baja California =

- City
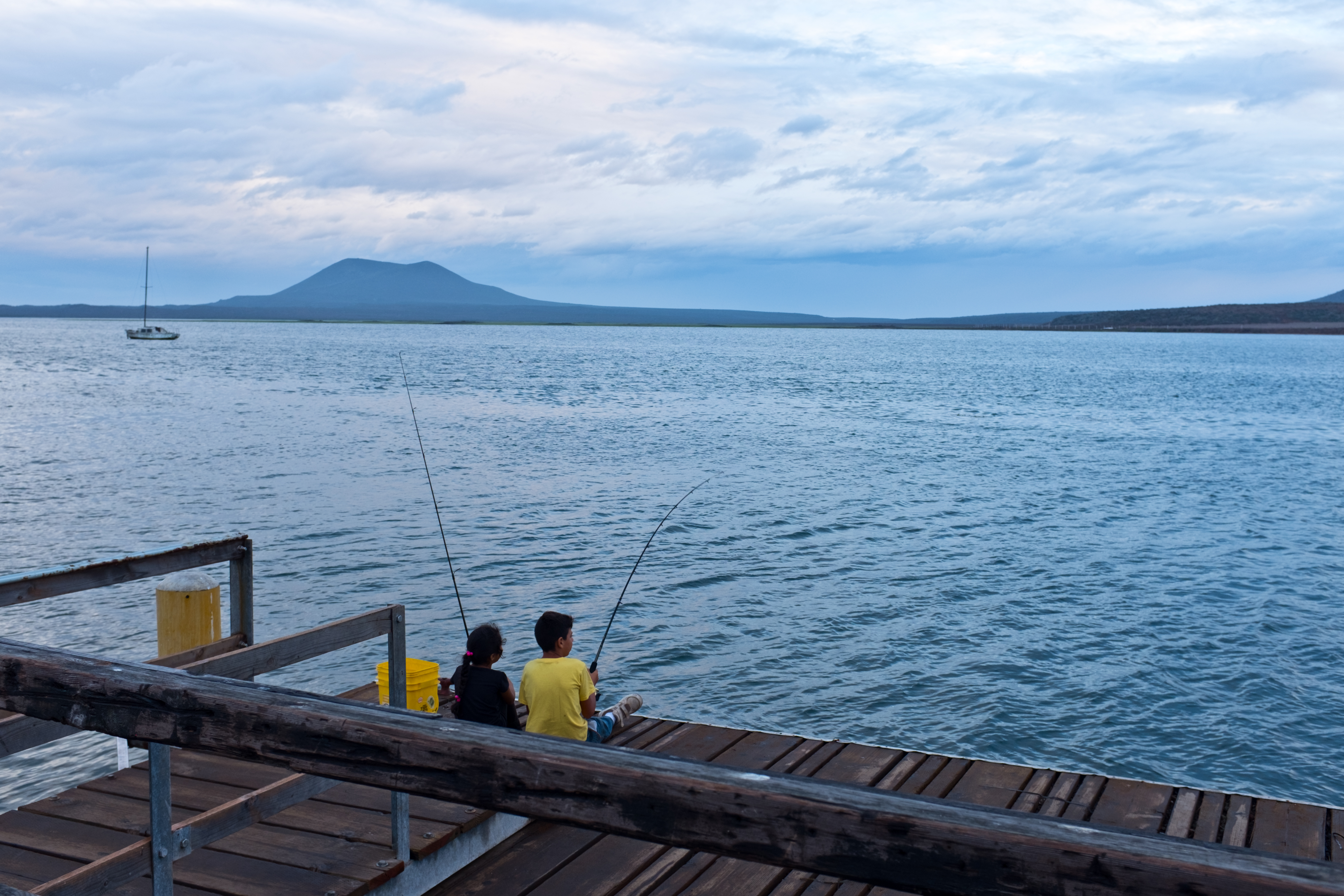
- View of the Bay of San Quintín

- Location in Mexico San Quintín, Baja California (Mexico)
- Coordinates: 30°33′37″N 115°56′33″W
- Country: Mexico
- State: Baja California
- Municipality: San Quintín
- as municipality: 2020

Area
  - Land: 14,263 sq mi (36,941 km^{2})
- Elevation: 92 ft (28 m)

Population (2010)
  - City: 4,777
  - Urban: 4,777
- Time zone: UTC–08:00 (Zona Noroeste)
  - Summer (DST): UTC–07:00 (DST)
- Area code: +52 616

San Quintín (Spanish for 'Saint Quentin') is a city in San Quintín Municipality, Baja California, located on the Pacific Coast of Mexico. The city had a population of 4777 in 2011. San Quintín is an important agricultural center for Baja California.

== History ==
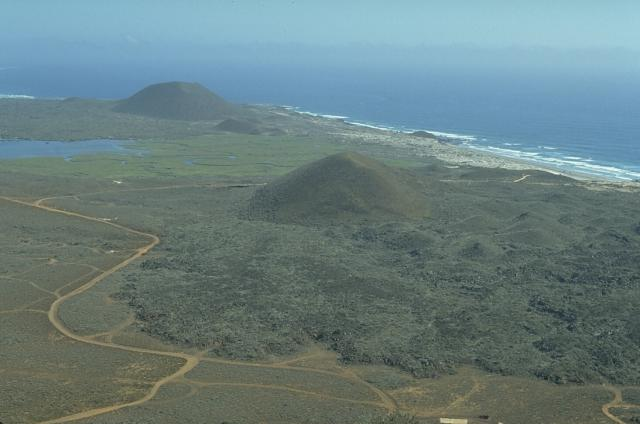
San Quintín State Nature Reserve.

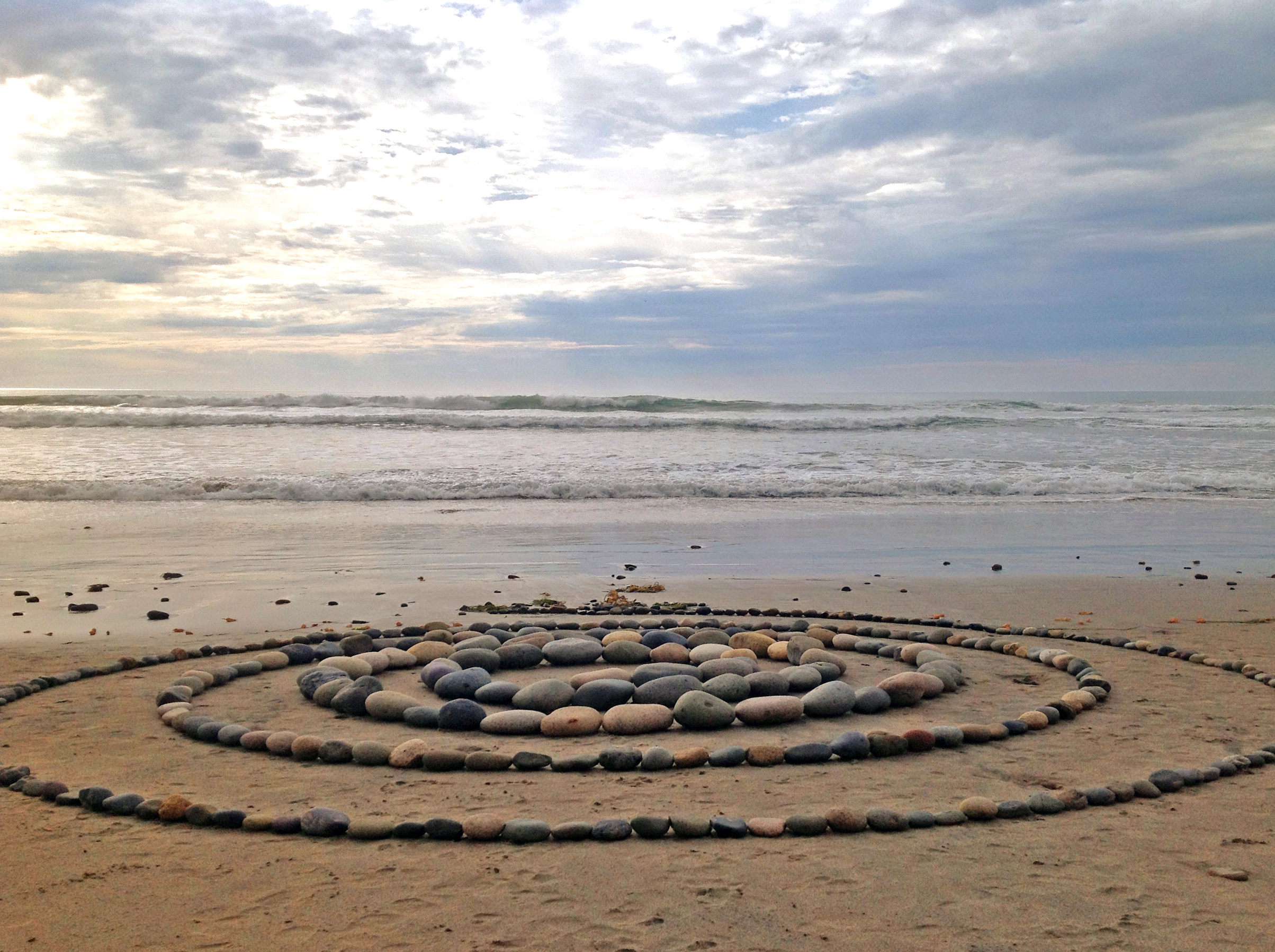
Beach in San Quintín.

In the early 1800s the sea otters of San Quintín Bay were targeted by a series of joint ventures between American maritime fur traders and the Russian–American Company (RAC). The first such venture involved the Boston-based maritime fur trading merchant ship O'Cain. RAC Chief Manager Alexander Baranov supplied O'Cain with twenty baidarkas (Aleutian kayaks) and about forty indigenous Alaskan sea otter hunters, plus two overseers to manage the hunters and hunting, Afanasii Shvetsov and Timofei Tarakanov. O'Cain sailed to San Quintín Bay and stayed for over three months while Tarakanov and Shvetsov led indigenous sea otter hunting parties all along the coast between Mission Rosario and Misión Santo Domingo de la Frontera. Several other US-Russian joint ventures followed. Within a few years the sea otters of Baja California were almost extinct.

In the 1880s, a British land company with plans for a wheat empire purchased much of the San Quintín area from the US–based International Land Company (ILC); at the time, ILC owned most of northern Baja. In response to promises of agricultural wealth, around a hundred English colonists purchased subdivided land tracts from the parent company, planted wheat, and constructed a gristmill. For flour transportation, the English built a pier on inner Bahiá San Quintín and began constructing a railway to link up with the Southern Pacific tracks to the north in California. Thirty kilometers of track were laid, including a rail causeway from the west bank of inner Bahiá San Quintín, before the colony failed. A 17-ton, six-wheeled locomotive still lies underwater at the mouth of the bay, the remains of a loading accident for the aborted railway.

A drought devastated one of the first wheat harvests, and by 1900 all the colonists abandoned San Quintín.

Remnants of the gristmill, the railroad causeway, the pier, and an English cemetery still stand along the perimeter of the inner bay. The English names on the cemetery's heavily weathered wooden crosses have faded from sight, and more recent Mexican graves are beginning to crowd out their neglected English counterparts.

Recently there has been foreign (especially Chinese) investment in San Quintin for the development of shellfish harvesting and export (especially abalone). A tourist hotel is also planned.

San Quintín has been running an abalone conservation project, a project to repopulate depleted areas and prevent extinction. The conservation process involves farm growing abalone for two-three years and put back into its natural habitat. Farmers wait three years after that, and abalone is extracted for commercialization.

On October 28, 2015, residents voted 17,580 to 7,548 in favor of San Quintin becoming its own municipality. On February 27, 2020, San Quintin separated from the municipality of Ensenada and became the state's sixth municipality. The agricultural plain roughly 50 kilometers from Camalu to Vicente Carranza, recorded a total of roughly 80,000 people in 2010.

== Geography ==
=== Climate ===
The temperatures tend to run warmer in summer and cooler in winter compared to San Diego, but out along the Pacific Ocean coastline about 5 miles (8 km) west of San Quintin, the climate is virtually identical to San Diego's weather, year-round.

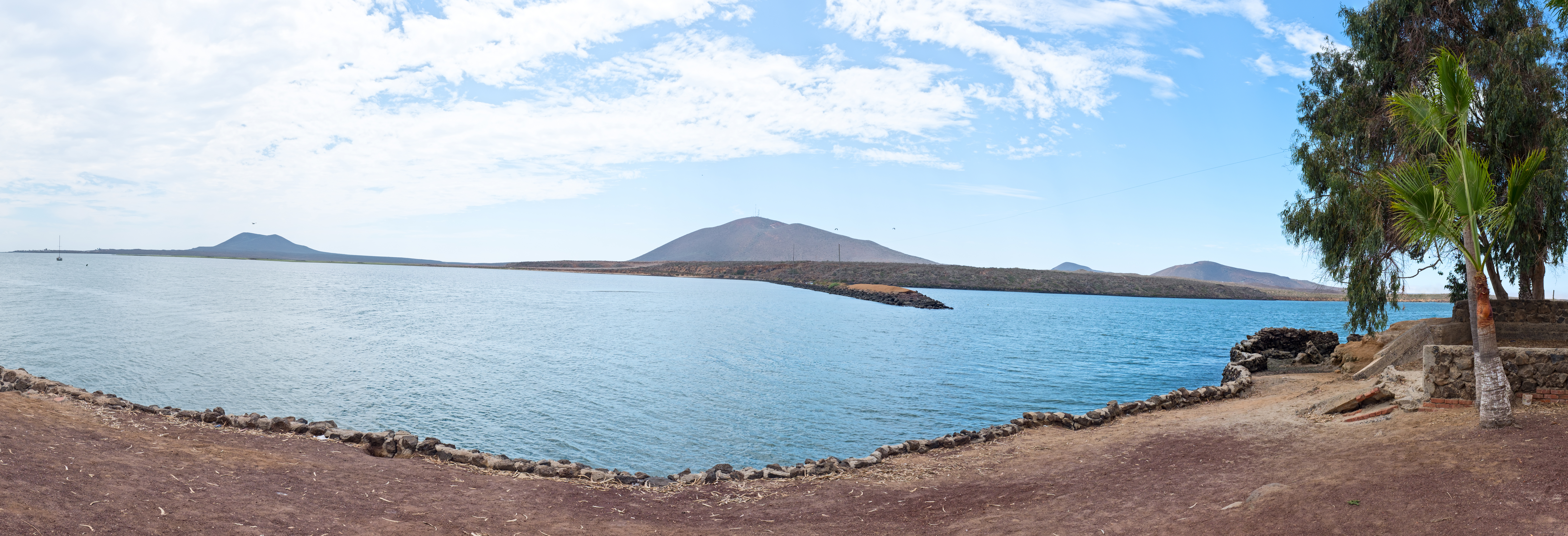
View of the Bay of San Quintín.

== Economy ==
San Quintín is home to the largest agricultural company in Baja California- Los Pinos.

=== Aquaculture ===
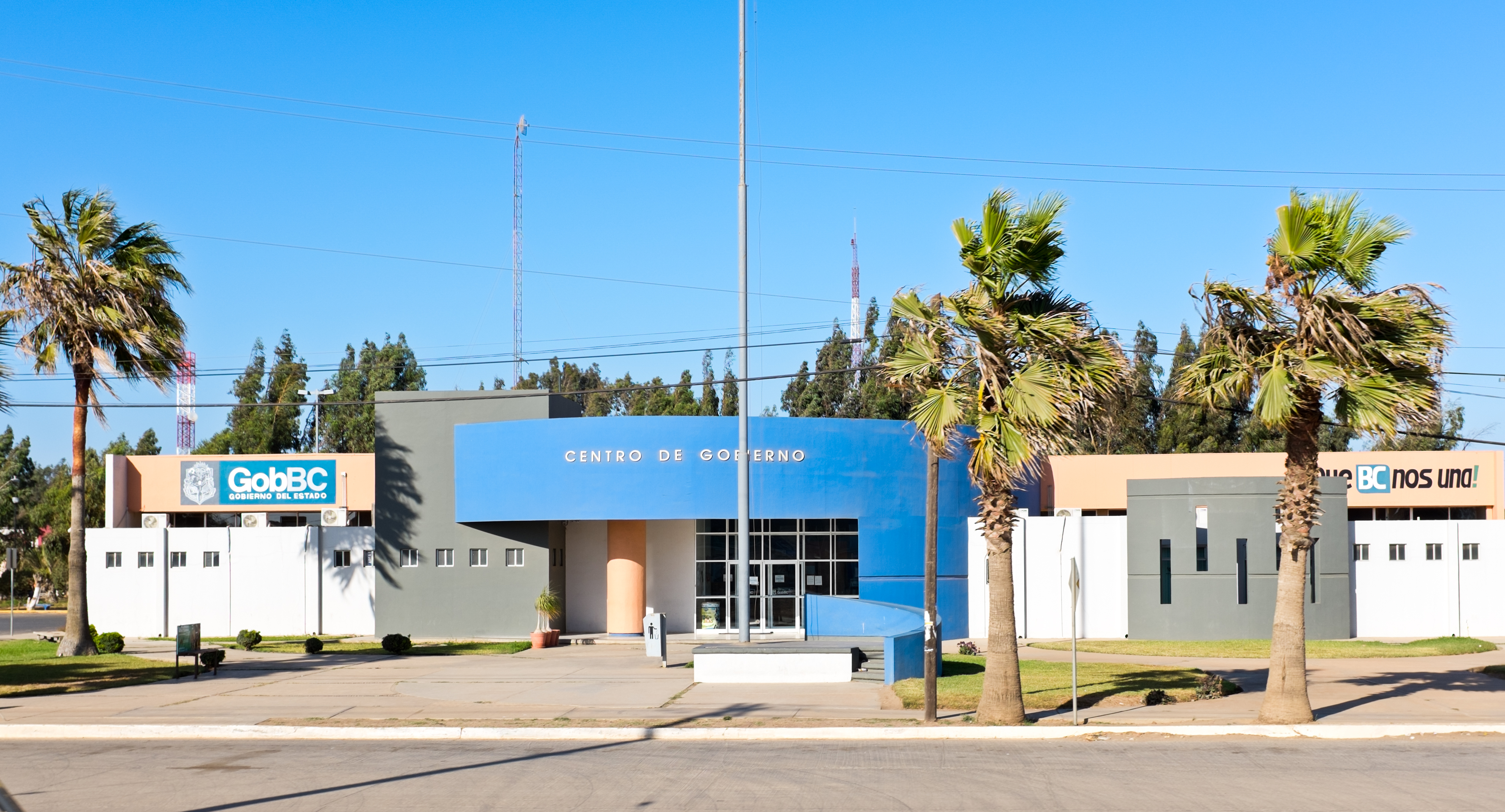
San Quintín government center.

In the realm of aquaculture, there are immense possibilities for growth. The extensive shoreline along the Pacific and the Sea of Cortes is in ideal condition, both biologically and economically speaking. The development and adaptation of aquaculture technology by Baja Californian institutions and the vocation of cultivating marine fish and mollusks have influenced the practice, making it a reality in present-day Baja California.

Due to the development in the cultivation of oysters, mussels and abalones, aquaculture has secured its place in the fishing industry and the demand for fishing products is increasing on a global scale. Baja California is a pioneer in the practice and at the forefront in aquaculture. Natural resources are at their maximum exploitation or have entered over-exploitation. Aquaculture has proved to be an answer to this crisis, as it is the area in the primary food sector where there are significant records of growth.

Fishing has become a tradition for many in Baja California, being distinguished worldwide for its high quality and variety. Business is conducted with distant locations such as Europe and Asia in addition to the United States and parts of Mexico. There is infrastructure in fisheries of all kinds, including technological, scientific, and specialized educational infrastructure.

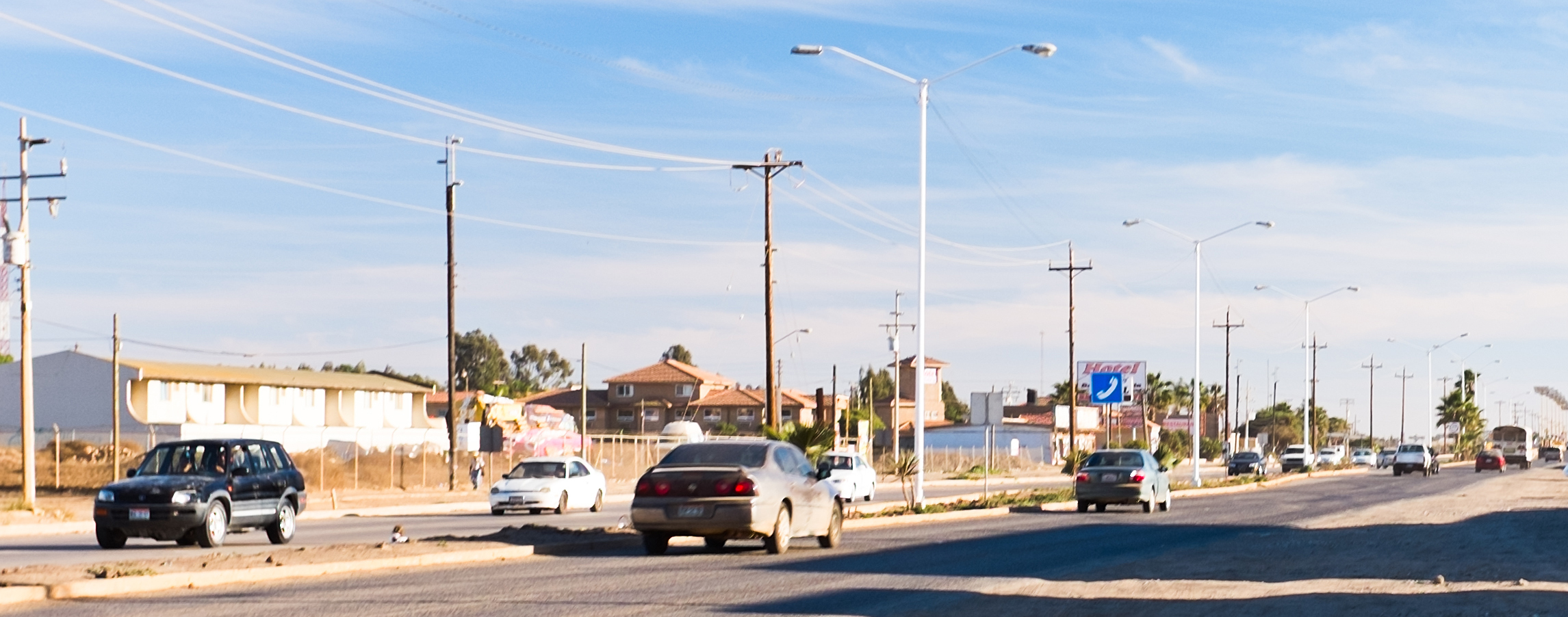
Highway 1 passing through the city.

Ensenada has many processing plants, canning machines, freezers, as well as fresh and live products, and gel production from seaweed. Several factories produce packages of different materials, such as tin cans, cardboard boxes, and extracted polyethylene packaging. The adjacent industrial areas in Baja California also facilitate the acquisition of equipment and spare parts.

There are shipyards and workshops to support the fishing industry as well as prestigious research centers for aquaculture that prepare students from a specialized secondary education, through technology programs in high school focusing on oceanography, to doctoral degrees in science. Resources have increased substantially in recent years, considering the aquaculture industry in Baja California began just two decades ago.

To date, significant progress has already been made, with the greatest development being the cultivation of the oyster in San Quintín, with Ostiones Guerrero, SA de CV being the oldest and largest producer of both Pacific Gigas and Kumamoto oysters in Bahia Falsa and home to La Ostionera, its signature restaurant on the bay where locals and tourists alike come to enjoy fresh oysters and other "mariscos". The local oyster harvests produce over 1000 tons annually as well as mussels, abalone and other local species. The Bahia Falsa is certified by the Food and Drug Administration of the United States which guarantees the quality of the products and facilitates the commercial concurrence to the markets of that country.

In addition to the natural wealth and the relative absence of pollution, it shares a border with a California, an important market. The most diverse shipments of seafood from Baja California cross the international border between Tijuana, B.C. and San Diego, California. The Los Angeles International Airport (LAX) is located 138 miles from the border with Mexico. From there, regular shipments of live fish and fresh seafood are made, using a route from the Baja California fishing fields ending at the Tsukiji fish market in Tokyo, Japan.

== Media ==
XEQIN-AM, a government-run indigenous community radio station that broadcasts in Mixtec, Zapotec and Triqui, is based in San Quintín. The Coatecas Altas Zapotec dialect is spoken in the surrounding areas.

== Transportation ==
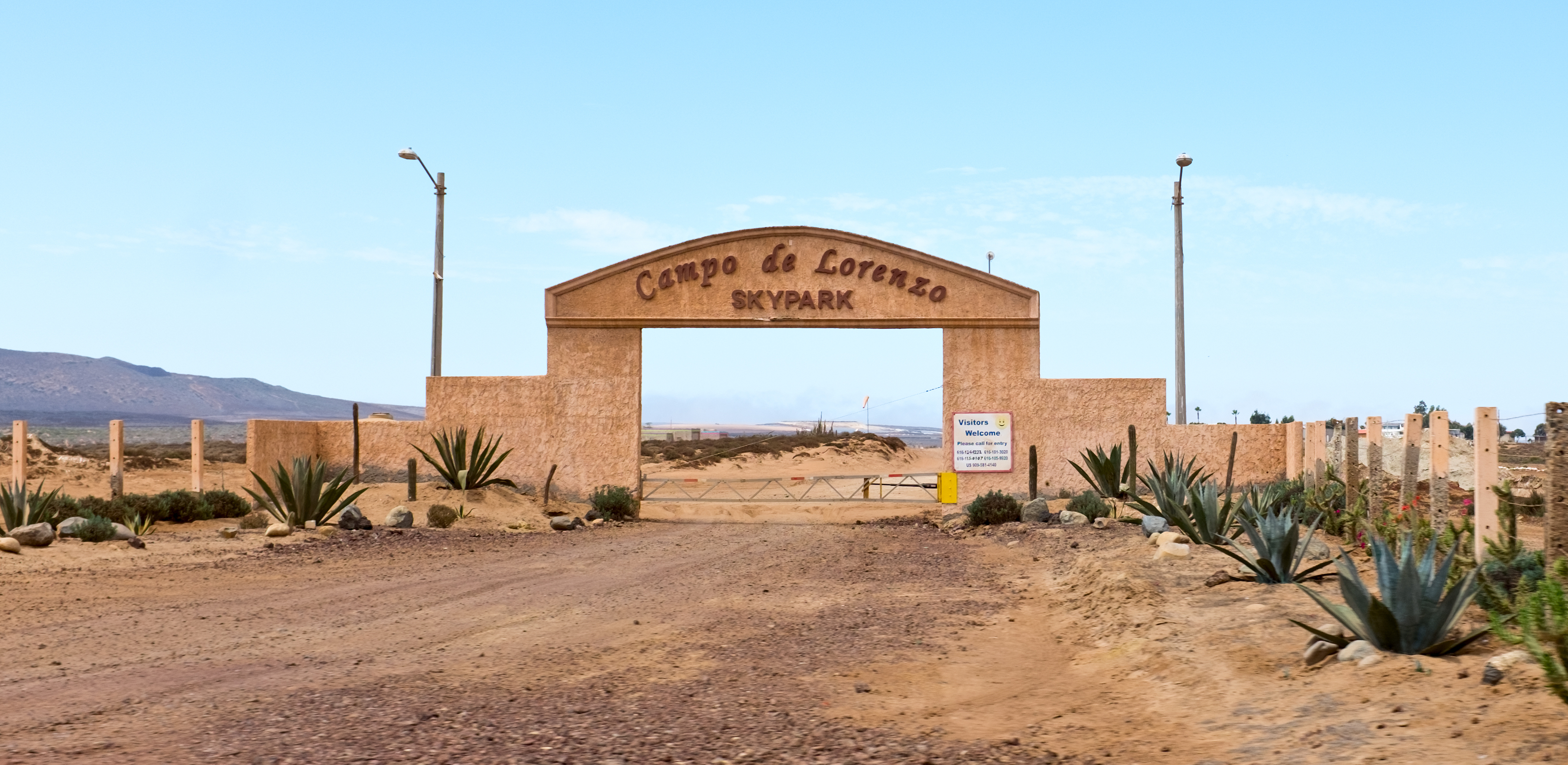
Campo de Lorenzo Skypark.

By land, San Quintín is communicated by the Federal Highway 1, which runs from Cabo San Lucas to Tijuana. By air, the San Quintín Valley is served by several airstrips:

- Cielito Lindo.
- El Buen Pastor Airstrip
- El Pedregal.
- Los Pinos.
- Rancho Magaña.

The San Quintín Airport is the only paved airstrip in the valley, but is a military field, so it is used for military aviation purposes only. The closest airports of entry are Ensenada and Tijuana.
