= List of airlines of Mexico =

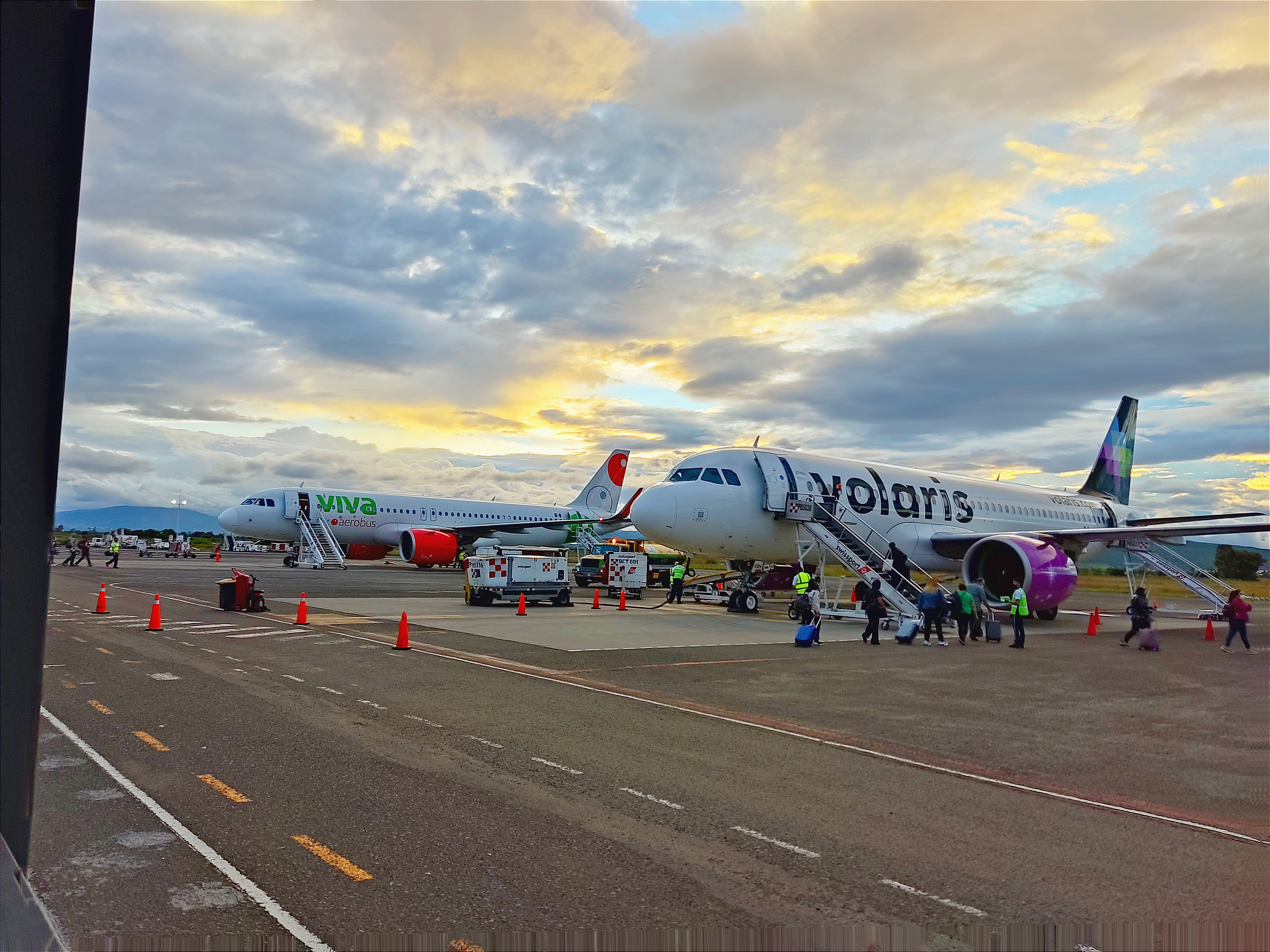
Volaris Airbus 320-271N and Viva Airbus 320-271N at Morelia International Airport

This is a list of airlines in Mexico, categorized by ICAO and IATA codes and callsigns, based on data as of 2025. A separate list covers defunct airlines of Mexico.

Commercial aviation in Mexico began in 1921 with Compañía Mexicana de Transportación Aérea in Mexico City. Today, Aeroméxico is the national flag carrier and the country’s largest airline by fleet size and number of destinations. Volaris leads by passengers carried, while Viva ranks third among major carriers. Other domestic and regional airlines include TAR Aerolíneas, Aerus, Aero Servicio Guerrero, and the recently launched, state-owned Mexicana de Aviación.

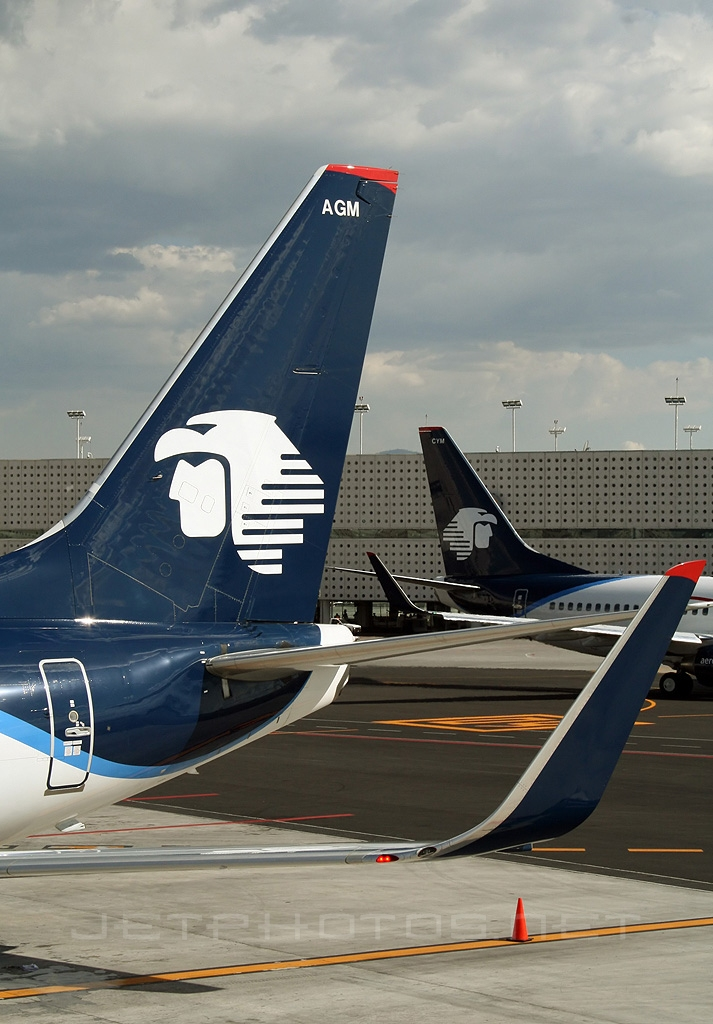
Aeroméxico Boeing 737-752 at Mexico City Airport

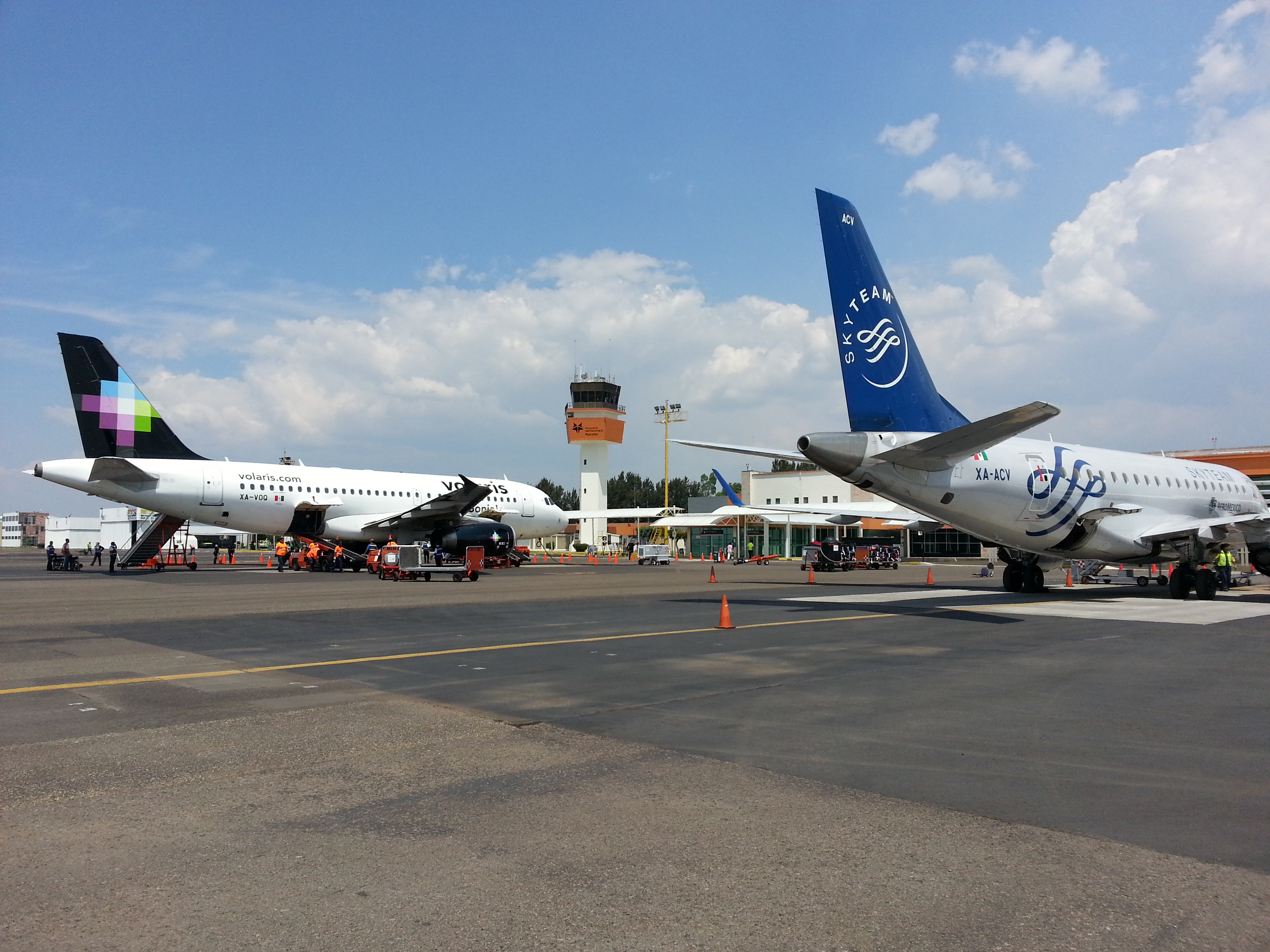
Volaris A319 and Aeromexico Connect Embraer 170 at Morelia International Airport

== Passenger airlines ==
=== Major carriers ===
National and low-cost airlines with extensive international networks and scheduled services.

Airline	Image	IATA	ICAO	Callsign	Hubs, Focus cities	Founded	Notes
Aeroméxico		AM	AMX	AEROMEXICO	Mexico City	1934	Flag carrier of Mexico. Member of Skyteam
Aeroméxico Connect		5D	SLI	COSTERA	Mexico City; Mexico City–AIFA	1988	Subsidiary of Aeroméxico
Viva		VB	VIV	VIVA	Monterrey; Cancun; Guadalajara; Mexico City; Mexico City–AIFA; Mérida; Tijuana	2006	
Volaris		Y4	VOI	VOLARIS	Guadalajara; Cancun; Mexico City; Monterrey; Tijuana	2004	

=== Regional airlines ===
Smaller airlines offering limited domestic or regional scheduled services.

Airline	Image	IATA	ICAO	Callsign	Hubs, Focus cities	Founded	Notes
Aéreo Servicio Guerrero			GUE	AERO NUEVO	Hermosillo	1997	
Aerotucán			RTU		Oaxaca	2001	
Aerus		ZV	RFD	RAFILHER	Monterrey	2022	
Mexicana de Aviación		XN	MXA	MEXICANA	Mexico City–AIFA	2023	
Señor Air			SEN		Cabo San Lucas	2023	
TAR Aerolineas		YQ	LCT	TAR	Querétaro	2012	

=== Other operators ===
Airlines with no scheduled passenger service; may include charter, seasonal, or irregular flights.

Airline	Image	IATA	ICAO	Callsign	Hubs, Focus cities	Founded	Notes
Aerodan			ROD	AERODAN		1994	
Aerolíneas Ejecutivas			LET	MEXALE	Toluca	1980	
Aeromaan			ERM	EOMAAN	Toluca	2002	
Aviesa					Toluca	1986	
AX Transporter			AXT	AX TRANSPORTER	Cancun	2013	
Eurus Aviation			EUS	EURUS	Toluca	2019	
First Jet			FJA	FIRSTJET		2013	
FlyMex			NTG	FLYMEX	Toluca	2004	Previously named VuelaMex
Transpais Aereo			TPM	TRANSPAIS	Monterrey	2014	

== Cargo airlines ==
Airline	Image	IATA	ICAO	Callsign	Hubs, Focus cities	Founded	Notes
Aeroméxico Cargo		QO			Mexico City	1989	Subsidiary of Aeroméxico
Aeronaves TSM			VTM	AERONAVES TSM	Saltillo	1995	
AeroUnion		6R	TNO	AEROUNION	Mexico City–AIFA	1998	
Awesome Cargo		A7	WIN	TENE AIRLINES	Mexico City–AFIA	2019	
Estafeta Carga Aérea		E7	ESF	ESTAFETA	San Luis Potosí	2000	
MasAir		M7	MAA	MAS CARGA	Mexico City–AIFA	1992	
TUM AeroCarga		T2	MCS	CARMEX	Toluca	2015	Previously named MCS AeroCarga; Ceased operations in 2025

== See also ==
- Lists of airlines
- List of defunct airlines of Mexico
- Largest airlines in the world
- List of largest airlines in North America
- List of passenger airlines
- List of charter airlines
- List of low-cost airlines
- List of regional airlines
- List of cargo airlines
- List of defunct airlines
- List of airlines by foundation date
- Flag carrier
- List of government-owned airlines
- List of airline holding companies
- Airline codes
- List of airline liveries and logos
- List of companies of Mexico
- Oneworld - Mexicana Airline alliance
- SkyTeam - Aeroméxico Airline alliance
- List of the busiest airports in Mexico
- List of airports in Mexico
- Airline destinations: Mexico
- Transportation in Mexico
- Tourism in Mexico
- Federal Civil Aviation Agency
