= Cielito Lindo Airstrip =

- IATA: none; ICAO: none

Summary
- Airport type: Public
- Location: San Quintín, Baja California
- Elevation AMSL: 29 ft / 8 m
- Coordinates: 30°24′35″N 115°55′15″W
- Interactive map of Cielito Lindo Airstrip

Runways
| Direction | Length | | Surface |
| Direction | ft | m | Surface |
|---|---|---|---|
| 10/28 | 2,315 | 705 | Soil |

Cielito Lindo Airstrip is a public-use dirt airstrip located South of San Quintín, Municipality of Ensenada, Baja California, Mexico, just on the Pacific Ocean coast, near the "La Pinta" Hotel. The airstrip is used solely for general aviation purposes. The CND code is used as identifier.
