= Ensenada Municipality =

Municipality in the Mexican state of Baja California

Ensenada Municipality Municipio de Ensenada
- Municipality
- Municipality of Ensenada
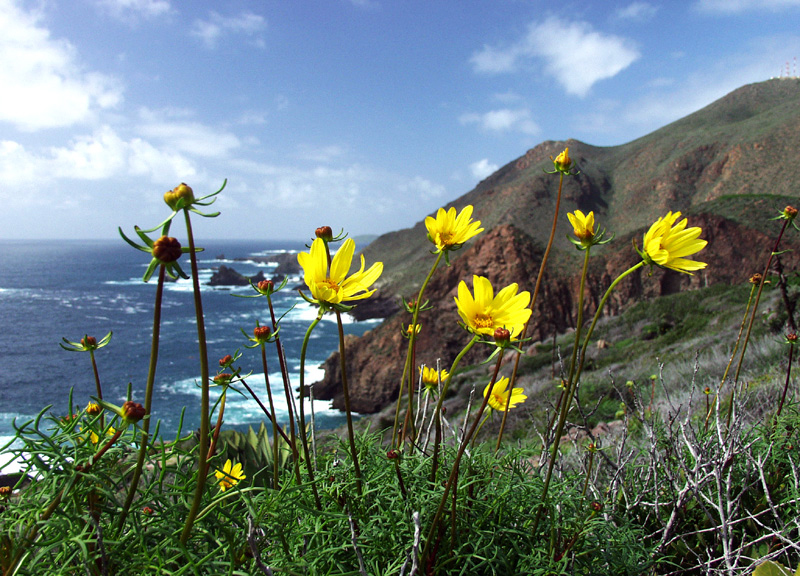
- The Pacific coast of Ensenada Municipality

- Flag Coat of arms

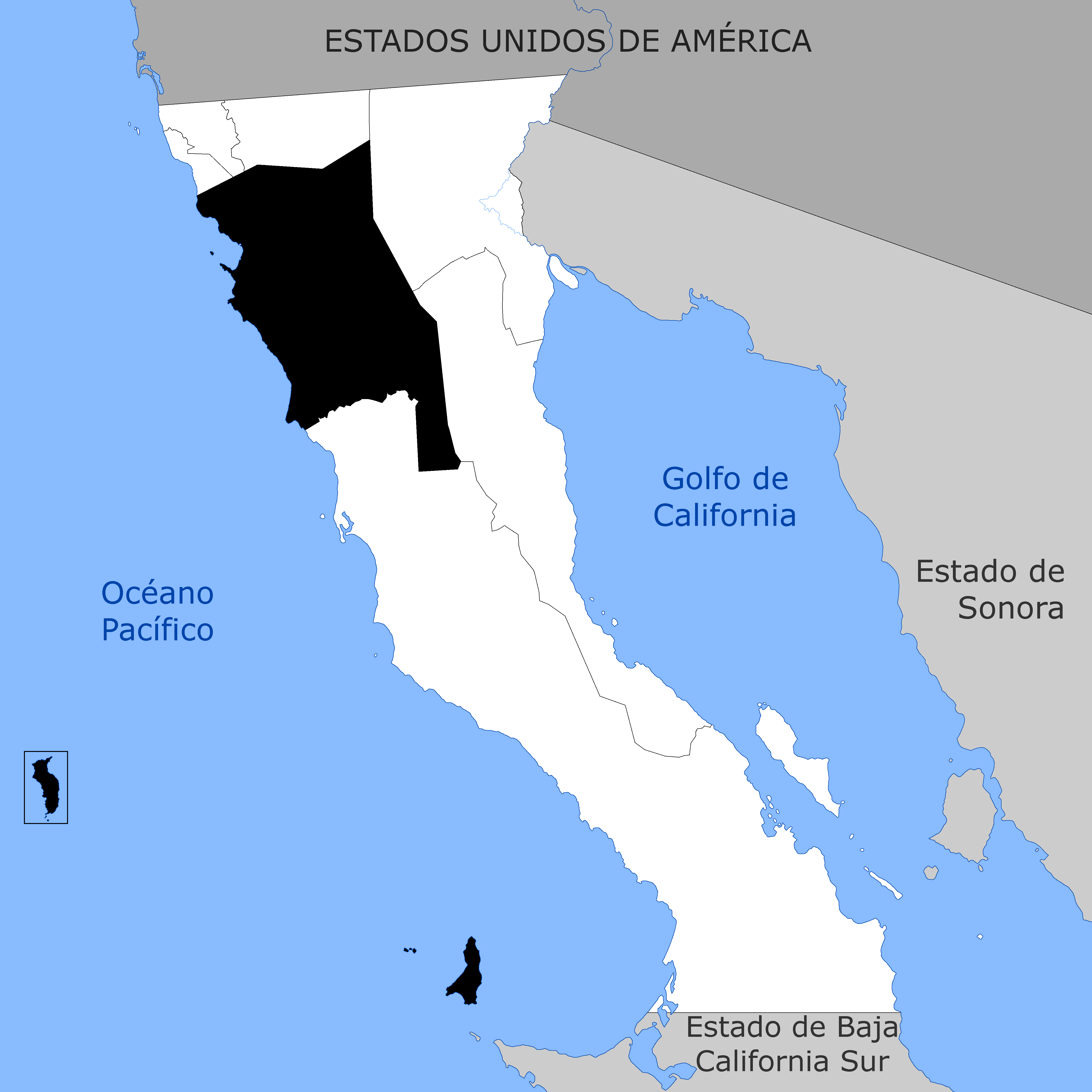
- Location of Ensenada in Baja California since 2022
- Coordinates: 31.519°N 116.005°W
- Country: Mexico
- State: Baja California
- Municipal seat: Ensenada
- Largest city: Ensenada
- Municipality established: 29 December 1953

Government
  - Municipal president: Claudia Agatón Muñiz (Morena)

Area
  - Total: 19,526.8 km^{2} (7,539.3 sq mi)

Population (2020)
  - Total: 443,807
  - Density: 22.7281/km^{2} (58.8655/sq mi)
- Time zone: UTC−08:00 (Zona Noroeste)
  - Summer (DST): UTC−07:00 (DST)
- Area code: +52 646
- INEGI code: 001
- Website: (in Spanish) Ayuntamiento de Ensenada
- Source: National Institute for Federalism and Municipal Development (Inafed) Former website inaccessible. It was substituted. National Institute for Federalism and Municipal Development (Inafed)

Ensenada is a municipality in the Mexican state of Baja California. It is the fourth-largest municipality in the country, with a land area of 19,526.8 km^{2} (7,539.3 sq mi) in 2020, making slightly smaller than the state of Hidalgo and larger than five other Mexican states.

Located offshore, Cedros Island and Guadalupe Island are part of the municipality, making Ensenada the westernmost municipality in Mexico and Latin America.

Incorporated on 15 May 1882 as the northern partido of the Baja California Territory, it became a municipality of the state of Baja California on 29 December 1953.

The municipality shares borders with every other municipality in the state: Tijuana, Playas de Rosarito and Tecate to the north, Mexicali and San Felipe to the east and southeast and San Quintín to the south. Its municipal seat is Ensenada, a port lying near the northwest corner of the municipality.

In 2009 a massive project was announced to build what would be Mexico's largest port in Punta Colonet, a largely uninhabited area 80 km (50 mi) south of the city of Ensenada, but as of 2025 no construction has begun.

In February 2020, San Quintín separated from Ensenada and became Baja California's sixth municipality. Prior to this, Ensenada was the country's largest municipality. In January 2022, Puertecitos separated from Ensenada to San Felipe and became Baja California's seventh municipality, further reducing the size of Ensenada Municipality.

== Subdivisions ==
The Ensenada municipality is administratively subdivided into 17 boroughs:

1. Ensenada
2. La Misión
3. El Porvenir
4. Francisco Zarco (Guadalupe)
5. San Antonio de las Minas
6. El Sauzal
7. Real del Castillo
8. Maneadero
9. Santo Tomás
10. Eréndira
11. San Vicente
12. Valle de la Trinidad
13. Colonet
14. Isla de Cedros
15. Sector Centro
16. Sector Noroeste
17. Chapultepec

== Demographics ==
Historical population
Year	Pop.	±%
1990	259,979	—
2000	370,730	+42.6%
2010	466,814	+25.9%
2020	443,807	−4.9%
From INEGI's Decennial Census.

As of 2020, the municipality had a total population of 443,807 in 1,698 localities.

Ensenada, the seat, has 330,652 residents, and the following are the largest urban communities:

- Rodolfo Sánchez Taboada (Maneadero) (27,969)
- El Sauzal de Rodríguez (11,371)
- El Zorrillo (8,522)
- San Vicente (5,062)
- Valle de Guadalupe (4,334)
- Valle de la Trinidad (3,381)
- Punta Colonet (3,095)
- Ojos Negros (2,707)
- Poblado Héroes de Chapultepec (2,360).

== Government ==
=== Municipal presidents ===
Term	Municipal president	Political party	Notes
Municipal presidents of Ensenada, Northern District of Baja California
1888-1889	Emilio Legaspy	Círculo Nacional Porfirista	
1889	Ricardo P. Eaton	Círculo Nacional Porfirista	
1889	Juan F. Montenegro	Círculo Nacional Porfirista	Acting municipal president
1889-1891	Rodolfo F. Nieto	Círculo Nacional Porfirista	
1891-1896	Ismael Sánchez	Círculo Nacional Porfirista	
1896-1897	José María Obando	Círculo Nacional Porfirista	
1897-1901	Carlos A. Guijosa	Círculo Nacional Porfirista	
1901	Alejandro Guerrero y Porres	Círculo Nacional Porfirista	
1901-1902	Enrique Ferniza	Círculo Nacional Porfirista	Acting municipal president
1902-1903	Alejandro Guerrero y Porres	Círculo Nacional Porfirista	Resumed
1903-1907	Eulogio Romero	Círculo Nacional Porfirista	
1907-1911	Manuel Labastida Castro	Círculo Nacional Porfirista	
Municipal presidents of Ensenada, Northern Territory of Baja California
1911-1915	David Zárate Zazueta		
1915-1916	Eugenie G. Beraud		
1916-1920	Antonio Ptacnik		
1920-1921	Othón P. Blanco		
1921	Ramón Moyron, Jr.		
1921-1922	David Zárate Zazueta		
1922-1923	Ramón Moyron, Jr.		
1923-1924	Luis G. Beltrán		
1924	Andrés E. Núñez		
1924-1925	Percy Hussong		
1925-1926	Gustavo Appel		
1926-1927	Manuel Robles Linares		
Municipal Council
1927-1928	Daniel Goldbaum		First councilman
Delegation of Government
1928	Daniel Goldbaum		First delegate
1929-1932	David Zárate Zazueta	PNR	Second delegate
1932-1936	Antonio Ortiz Ortega	PNR	Third delegate
1936-1944	Juan Julio Dunn Legaspy	PNR; PRM	Fourth delegate
1944-1945	Braulio Maldonado Sánchez	PRM	Fifth delegate
Constitutionally elected municipal presidents
01/12/1953-1956	David Ojeda Ochoa	PRI	
1956-31/10/1956	Víctor Salazar	PRI	Acting municipal president
01/11/1956-31/10/1959	Santos B. Cota	PRI	
01/11/1959-31/10/1962	Elpidio Berlanga de León	PRI	
01/11/1962-31/10/1965	Adolfo Ramírez Méndez	PRI	
01/11/1965-31/10/1968	Jorge Olguín Hermida	PRI	
01/11/1968-31/10/1971	Guilebaldo Silva Cota	PRI	
01/11/1971-31/10/1974	Octavio Pérez Pazuengo	PRI	
01/11/1974-31/10/1977	Jorge Moreno Bonet	PRI	
01/11/1977-31/10/1980	Luis González Ruiz	PRI	
01/11/1980-31/10/1983	Raúl Ramírez Funcke	PRI	
01/11/1983-31/10/1986	David Ojeda Ochoa	Socialist Workers' Party, PST	First municipal president out of an opposition party
01/11/1986-19/04/1989	Ernesto Ruffo Appel	PAN	He applied for a temporary leave in order to run for the state governor office, which he got
20/04/1989-31/10/1989	Enrique Chapela Zapién	PAN	Acting municipal president
01/11/1989-31/10/1992	Jesús del Palacio Lafontaine	PAN	
01/11/1992-31/10/1995	Óscar Sánchez del Palacio	PAN	
01/11/1995-31/10/1998	Manuel Montenegro Espinoza	PRI	
01/11/1998-2001	Daniel Quintero Peña	PRI	He applied for a temporary leave in order to seek the state governor office, which he didn't get
2001-31/10/2001	Ricardo Arjona Goldbaum	PRI	Acting municipal president
01/11/2001-31/10/2004	Jorge Antonio Catalán Sosa	PAN; PVEM	Alliance for Baja California
01/11/2004-31/10/2007	César Mancillas Amador	PAN	
01/11/2007-31/10/2010	Pablo Alejo López Núñez	PAN; Panal; PES	Alliance for Baja California
01/11/2010-31/10/2013	Enrique Pelayo Torres	PRI; PVEM	Coalition For a Responsible Government
01/11/2013-31/10/2016	Gilberto Hirata Chico	PRI PT; PVEM PES	Coalition Compromise for Baja California
01/11/2016-30/09/2019	Marco Antonio Novelo Osuna	PRI PT; PVEM Panal	Coalition PRI-PT-PVEM-Panal
01/10/2019-30/09/2021	Armando Ayala Robles	Morena	
01/10/2021-28/02/2024	Armando Ayala Robles	Morena	He was reelected on 06/06/2021
01/03/2024-30/09/2024	Carlos Ibarra Aguiar	Morena	Acting municipal president
01/10/2024-	Claudia Agatón Muñiz	Morena	

== See also ==
- Punta Colonet, Baja California
- Maneadero
