= Cota =

Cota or COTA may refer to:

== People ==
=== Surname ===
- Ava Michelle Cota (born 2002), American actress
- Chad Cota (born 1971), American football player
- Chase Cota (born 1999), American football player
- Ed Cota (born 1976), American basketball player
- Frane Cota (1898–1951), Croatian sculptor
- Humberto Cota (born 1979), Mexican baseball player
- José Carlos Cota Osuna (born 1946), Mexican politician
- Josefina Cota Cota (born 1956), Mexican politician
- Leonel Cota Montaño (born 1958), Mexican politician
- Manuel Alejandro Cota (born 1991), Mexican politician
- Manuel Humberto Cota Jiménez (born 1961), Mexican politician
- Margarita Cota-Cárdenas (born 1941), American poet and author
- Norman Cota (1893–1971), United States Army officer who fought during World War II
- Rahim Çota, Albanian politician
- Roberto Cota (born 1968), Italian politician
- Rodrigo Cota de Maguaque (died 1498), Spanish poet
- Rosa Delia Cota Montaño (born 1951), Mexican politician

=== Given name ===
- Cotah Ramaswami, Indian cricket and tennis player

== Places ==
- Circuit of the Americas, a race track near Austin, Texas, United States
- Cota, Cundinamarca, a municipality in the department of Cundinamarca, Colombia
- Cota Creek, a tributary of the Upper Mississippi River in Iowa, United States

== Other ==
- Celebration of the Arts Festival
- Central Ohio Transit Authority
- Children of the Atom (comics)
- Children's Organ Transplant Association
- College of the Arts, Windhoek
- Council on the Ageing
- Cota (plant), a genus of plants of the tribe Anthemideae, native to Europe, North Africa, and southwestern Asia, used for tea
- Cota (insect), a genus of groundhoppers in the family Tetrigidae
- Cota (power), a wireless power technology
- X-Men: Children of the Atom (comics)
- X-Men: Children of the Atom (video game)

== See also ==
- The dictionary definition of Appendix:Variations of "cota" at Wiktionary
