= Jesús Druk González =

Mexican politician

Member of the Congress of Baja California Sur from the 8th district
- In office 15 March 2002 – 14 March 2005
- Preceded by: César Uscanga Amador
- Succeeded by: Oscar René Nuñez Cosío

Rector of the Autonomous University of Baja California Sur
- In office 1993–1999
- Succeeded by: Jorge Alberto Vale Sánchez

Personal details
- Born: 1952 or 1953 (age 73–74) San José del Cabo, Baja California Sur, Mexico
- Citizenship: Mexican
- Party: PRD
- Education: Autonomous University of Baja California (BS); University of the Pacific (MS)

Jesús Druk González (born 1952/1953) is a Mexican politician representing the Party of the Democratic Revolution (PRD). He served in the X Legislature of the Congress of Baja California Sur from 2002 to 2005. He was also the PRD nominee for Governor of Baja California Sur in 2015. Outside of politics, he served as the rector of the Autonomous University of Baja California Sur from 1993 to 1999.

== Academic career ==
Druk earned his undergraduate degree in oceanography from the Autonomous University of Baja California (UABC) Ensenada campus in 1978 before earning his master's degree in biological sciences from the University of the Pacific in 1983. From 1977 to 1981, Druk was the director of the UABC Institute of Oceanography Research. In 1984, Druk joined the fisheries engineering department at the Autonomous University of Baja California Sur (UABCS) as a full-time professor. He also headed the marine biology department. In 1987, Druk was named the school's director of academic support. The following year, he became a founding member of the Mexican Ichthyology Society.

Druk stopped teaching in 1990 when he was named general secretary of UABCS. Druk served as rector of the university from 1993 to 1999. He was re-elected once in 1996. During his term as rector, the university opened an extension campus in Guerrero Negro in 1995, offering degrees in economics and agricultural engineering in its first year. In 1998, he was accused of embezzlement and diversion of public funds. In 2010, the president of the PRI state branch, Ricardo Barroso Agramont, blamed Druk and his successor as rector, Jorge Vale, for causing the longtime financial crisis at the university, citing millions of pesos in missing funds.

== Political career ==
Druk entered politics in 1999, joining the cabinet of the then-Governor of Baja California Sur, Leonel Cota Montaño, as his secretary of finances and administration. He was subsequently appointed the secretary of economic development the following year. In 2002, Druk won a seat representing the 8th district in the X Legislature of the Congress of Baja California Sur, where he was president of the Grand Committee. After his three-year term in the state congress as a member of the Party of the Democratic Revolution (PRD), Druk served as the president of the PRD's Baja California Sur branch from 2005 to 2008.

From 2009 to 2011, Druk worked for the state government as the director general of the civil registry. He then served as the general director of ecology for Los Cabos Municipality. In 2013, Druk was named the general secretary of Los Cabos under the administration of municipal president José Antonio Agúndez Montaño.

In November 2014, Druk replaced Rosa Delia Cota Montaño to once again become president of the PRD state branch.

In the 2015 Sonora elections, Druk was designated the gubernatorial nominee for the Movimiento Progresista, a coalition formed by the PRD, the Labor Party (PT) and the Citizens' Movement (MC). He was selected through an internal election, beating PRD candidates Rosa Delia Cota Montaño and Guillermo Santillán Meza and PT candidate Alfredo Porras Domínguez. Ahead of the general election, Druk polled between 12 and 20 percent, placing him third behind PAN candidate Carlos Mendoza Davis, the clear favorite, and PRI candidate Ricardo Barroso Agramont. Druk campaigned on forming a more inclusive government towards all sexual identities, as well as the legalization of marijuana. He ultimately finished in third place, receiving about 8.6 percent of the vote as Mendoza Davis won the governorship.

In the leadup to the 2018 elections, PRD president Alejandra Barrales was negotiating a deal with the PAN to form a coalition, which Druk endorsed. Rosa Delia Cota Montaño, the sole PRD deputy in the state congress, claimed that Druk made the endorsement without consulting local party members. She left the party a few months later after 17 years of membership, citing fears that the PRD was becoming a "PAN satellite" party. Druk chose not to run for re-election as state party president, ending his term in January 2018.
