= Rogelio Martínez Santillán =

Mexican politician

Member of the Congress of Baja California Sur from the 3rd district
- In office 15 March 2005 – 14 March 2008
- Preceded by: Rosalía Montaño Acevedo
- Succeeded by: María Magdalena Cuellar Pedraza

Personal details
- Born: June 1960 Ciudad Constitución, Baja California Sur, Mexico
- Died: November 2017 (aged 57)
- Party: PRD
- Education: La Paz Urban Normal School

Rogelio Martínez Santillán (June 1960 – November 2017) was a Mexican educator, trade unionist and politician. He served in the XI Legislature of the Congress of Baja California Sur from 2005 to 2008 as a member of the Party of the Democratic Revolution (PRD).

== Biography ==
Martínez was born in June 1960 in Ciudad Constitución, Baja California Sur. After graduating from the La Paz Urban Normal School in 1981, he worked as a teacher and got involved in the teachers' union.

Martínez entered the public service as the director of civic participation in his native Comondú Municipality. He then served as the syndic of La Paz Municipality from 1996 to 1999 before serving as the director of public security and municipal transit. Martínez subsequently joined the administration of the Governor of Baja California Sur, serving as Oficial Mayor for a three-year period.

In 2005, Martínez won a seat in the XI Legislature of the Congress of Baja California Sur representing the 3rd district. He earned 42.9 percent of the vote, while his closest challenger, Blanca Esthela Meza Torres, finished with 30.5 percent. Martínez served his full three-year term and presided over the Gran Comisión. However, he was accused of misappropriating more than MXN$8 million by former Governor Leonel Cota Montaño.

In 2010, Martínez was named the director general of the Colegios de Bachilleres (COBACH) by Governor Narciso Agúndez Montaño. He died in November 2017 and was honored at a session of the state congress a few days afterward.
