= 1st federal electoral district of Baja California Sur =

Federal electoral district of Mexico

Baja California Sur's 1st
- Electoral district of the Chamber of Deputies of Mexico

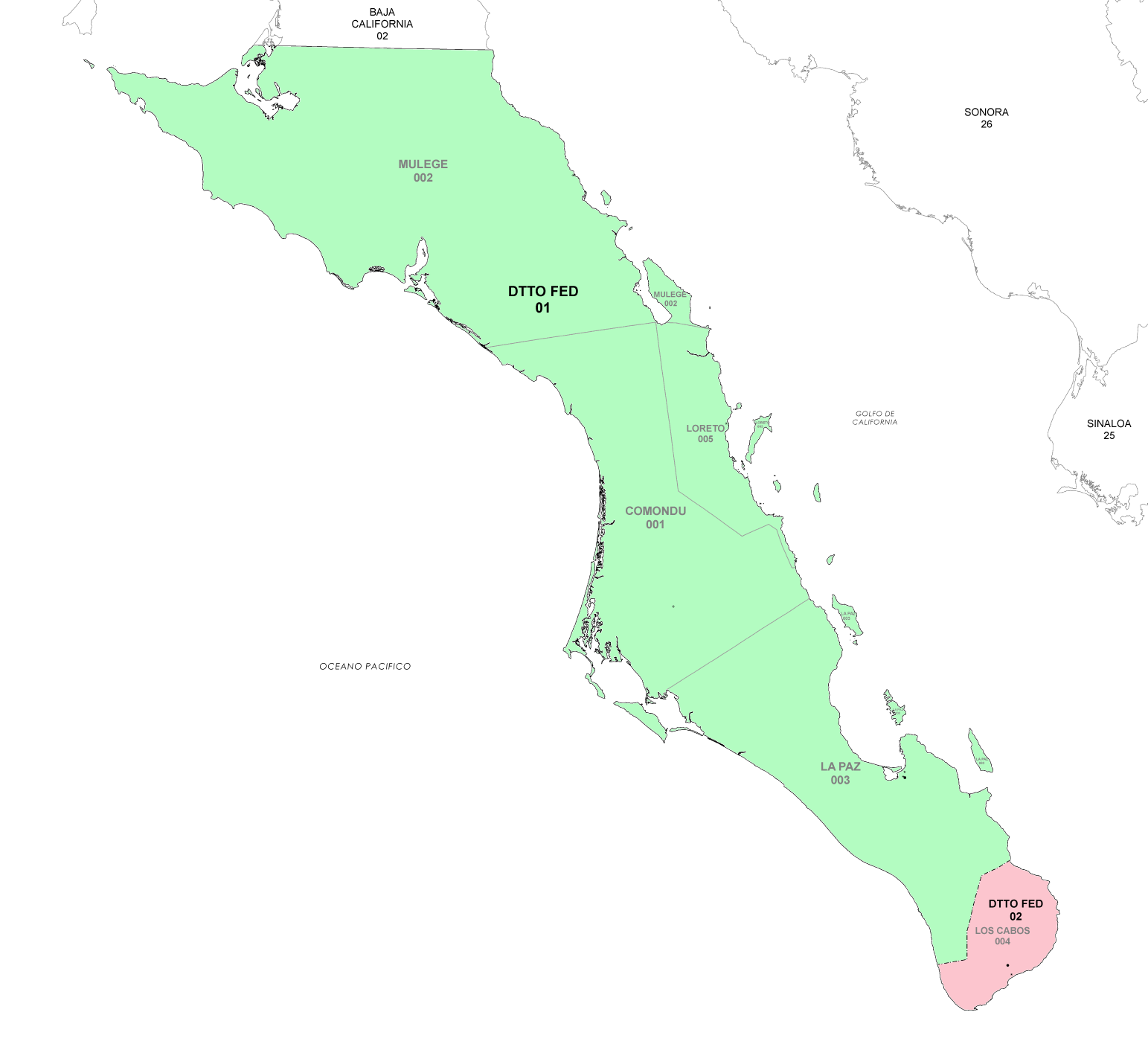
- 1st district

Incumbent
- Member: Manuel Cota Cárdenas
- Party: ▌Ecologist Green Party
- Congress: 66th (2024–2027)

District
- State: Baja California Sur
- Head town: La Paz
- Coordinates: 24°08′N 110°18′W
- Covers: Comondú, Loreto, Mulegé, La Paz
- PR region: First
- Precincts: 355
- Population: 447,347 (2020 census)

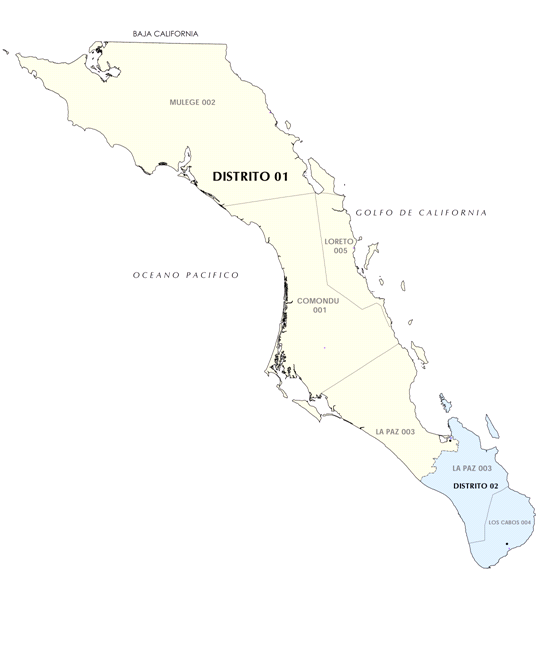
Baja California Sur under the 2017–2022 districting plan

The 1st federal electoral district of Baja California Sur (Spanish: Distrito electoral federal 01 de Baja California Sur) is one of the 300 electoral districts into which Mexico is divided for elections to the federal Chamber of Deputies and one of two such districts in the state of Baja California Sur.

It elects one deputy to the lower house of Congress for each three-year legislative session by means of the first-past-the-post system. Votes cast in the district also count towards the calculation of proportional representation ("plurinominal") deputies elected from the first region.

The current member for the district, elected in the 2024 general election, is Manuel Alejandro Cota Cárdenas of the Ecologist Green Party of Mexico (PVEM).

== District territory ==
Under the 2023 districting plan adopted by the National Electoral Institute (INE), which is to be used for the 2024, 2027 and 2030 federal elections, the first district covers 355 electoral precincts (secciones electorales) across the municipalities of Comondú, Loreto, Mulegé, and La Paz: i.e., the entire state except for Los Cabos at the southern tip of the peninsula.

The district's head town (cabecera distrital), where results from individual polling stations are gathered together and tallied, is the state capital, the city of La Paz. The district reported a population of 447,347 in the 2020 census.

== Previous districting schemes ==
Evolution of electoral district numbers
	1974	1978	1996	2005	2017	2023
Baja California Sur	2	2	2	2	2	2
Chamber of Deputies	196	300				

2017–2022

The state's three northern municipalities (Comondú, Loreto and Mulegé), plus the northern portion of La Paz. The head town was La Paz.

2005–2017

The state's three northern municipalities and the westernmost two-thirds of the La Paz. The district's head town was the city of Santa Rosalía.

1996–2005

The state's three northern municipalities only, with the head town at Santa Rosalía.

1978–1996

The districting scheme in force from 1978 to 1996 was the result of the 1977 electoral reforms, which increased the number of single-member seats in the Chamber of Deputies from 196 to 300. Baja California Sur's seat allocation, however, remained unchanged at two. The 1st district had its head town at La Paz and covered that city and its municipality.

Pre-1974

Before Baja California Sur acquired statehood in 1974 and was still a federal territory, it was entitled to return only one deputy to Congress; the district known as the sole district of the Southern Territory of Baja California (Distrito único del Territorio Sur de Baja California) therefore covered the whole of modern-day Baja California Sur. The state's first district is considered the successor of the territory's sole district.

== Deputies returned to Congress ==
(Mexico) National parties
- Current
- PAN
- PRI
- PT
- PVEM
- MC
- Morena
- PAZ
- Somos
- Defunct or local only
- PLM
- PNR
- PRM
- PNM
- PP
- PPS
- PARM
- PFCRN
- CON
- PANAL
- PSD
- PES
- PES
- PRD

Baja California Sur's 1st district
Election	Deputy	Party	Term	Legislature
1958	Alejandro Martínez Rodríguez	Institutional Revolutionary Party	1958–1961	44th Congress
1961	Antonio Navarro Encinas	Institutional Revolutionary Party	1961–1964	45th Congress
1964	Alberto Alvarado Arámburo	Institutional Revolutionary Party	1964–1967	46th Congress
1967	Ángel César Mendoza Arámburo	Institutional Revolutionary Party	1967–1970	47th Congress
1970	Rafael Castillo Castro	Institutional Revolutionary Party	1970–1973	48th Congress
1973	Antonio Carrillo Huacuja	Institutional Revolutionary Party	1973–1976	49th Congress
1976	Víctor Manuel Peralta Osuna	Institutional Revolutionary Party	1976–1979	50th Congress
1979	Armando Trasviña Taylor	Institutional Revolutionary Party	1979–1982	51st Congress
1982	Jesús Murillo Aguilar	Institutional Revolutionary Party	1982–1985	52nd Congress
1985	Víctor Manuel Liceaga Ruibal	Institutional Revolutionary Party	1985–1988	53rd Congress
1988	José Luis Parra Rubio	Institutional Revolutionary Party	1988–1991	54th Congress
1991	Guillermo Mercado Romero; Yolanda Robinson Manríquez	Institutional Revolutionary Party	1991–1993; 1993–1994	55th Congress
1994	Leonel Cota Montaño (Note: Cota Montaño requested a leave of absence on 10 October 1995. His alternate replaced him.); Amadeo Murillo Aguilar	Institutional Revolutionary Party	1994–1997	56th Congress
1997	José Carlos Cota Osuna	Institutional Revolutionary Party	1997–2000	57th Congress
2000	Miguel Vega Pérez	Institutional Revolutionary Party	2000–2003	58th Congress
2003	Francisco Javier Obregón Espinoza	Party of the Democratic Revolution	2003–2006	59th Congress
2006	Juan Adolfo Orcí Martínez	Party of the Democratic Revolution	2006–2009	60th Congress
2009	Marcos Covarrubias Villaseñor (Note: Covarrubias Villaseñor resigned his seat on 22 July 2010.); Silvia Puppo Gastélum	Party of the Democratic Revolution	2009–2010; 2010–2012	61st Congress
2012	Francisco Pelayo Covarrubias	National Action Party (Mexico)	2012–2015	62nd Congress
2015	Jisela Paes Martínez	National Action Party (Mexico)	2015–2018	63rd Congress
2018	Ana Ruth García Grande	National Regeneration Movement	2018–2021	64th Congress
2021	Marco Antonio Almendáriz Puppo	National Action Party (Mexico)	2021–2024	65th Congress
2024	Manuel Alejandro Cota Cárdenas (Note: Originally elected for Morena, Cota Cárdenas switched to the PVEM at the start of the congressional session.)	National Regeneration Movement Ecologist Green Party of Mexico	2024–2027	66th Congress

== Presidential elections ==
Baja California Sur's 1st district
Election	District won by	Party or coalition	%
2018	Andrés Manuel López Obrador	Juntos Haremos Historia	61.4395
2024	Claudia Sheinbaum Pardo	Sigamos Haciendo Historia	56.5285
