= 2nd federal electoral district of Baja California Sur =

Federal electoral district of Mexico

Baja California Sur's 2nd
- Electoral district of the Chamber of Deputies of Mexico

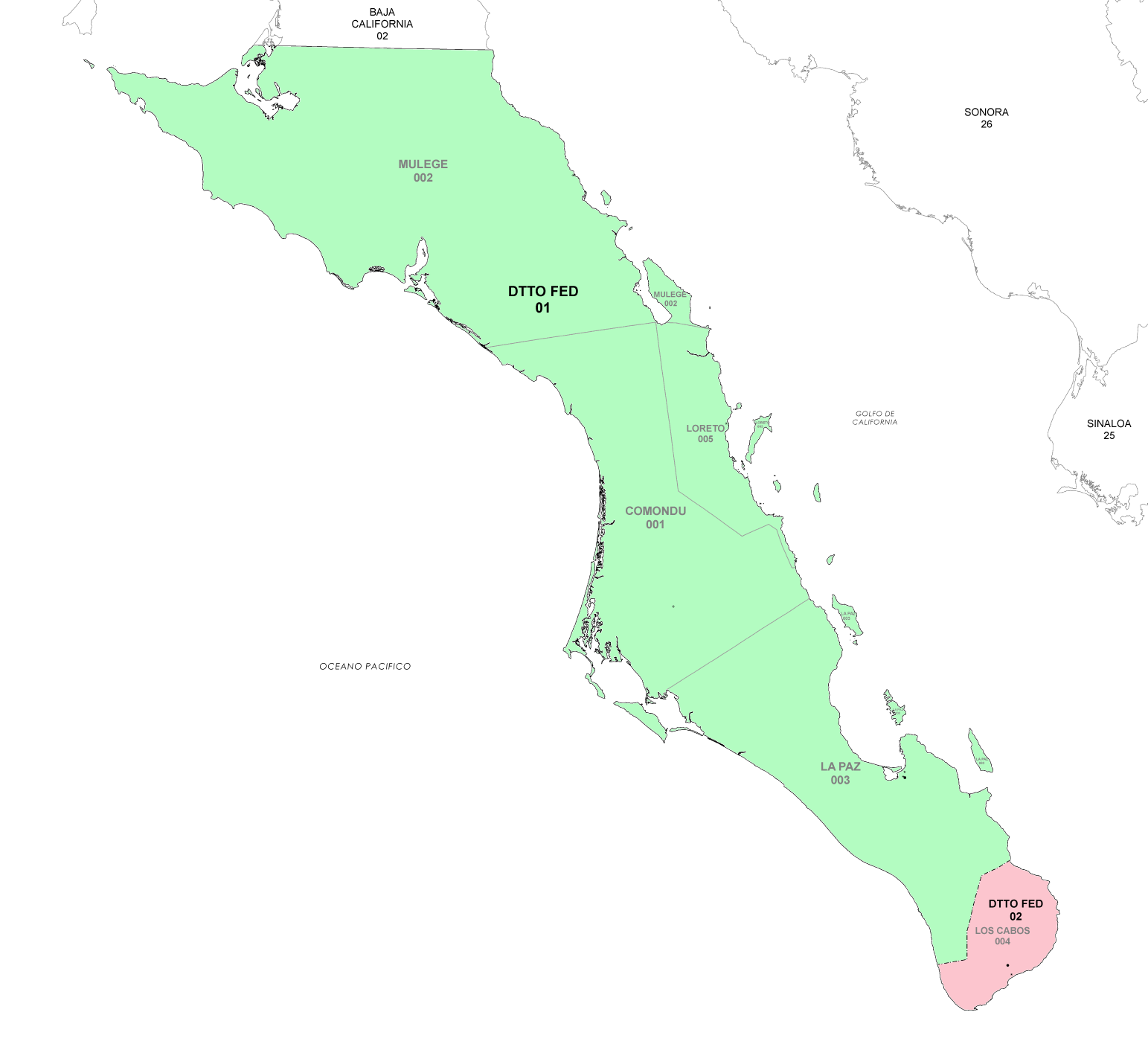
- 2nd district

Incumbent
- Member: Luis Armando Díaz
- Party: ▌Labour Party
- Congress: 66th (2024–2027)

District
- State: Baja California Sur
- Head town: San José del Cabo
- Coordinates: 23°03′N 109°42′W
- Covers: Los Cabos
- PR region: First
- Precincts: 164
- Population: 351,100 (2020 census)

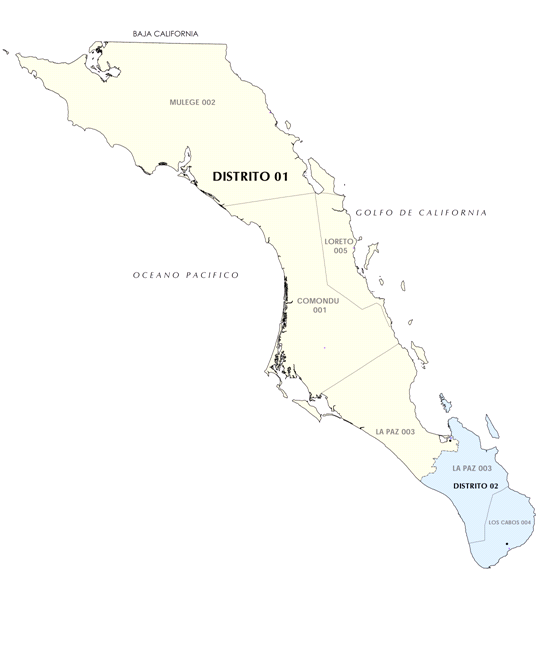
Baja California Sur under the 2017–2022 districting plan

The 2nd federal electoral district of Baja California Sur (Spanish: Distrito electoral federal 02 de Baja California Sur) is one of the 300 electoral districts into which Mexico is divided for elections to the federal Chamber of Deputies and one of two such districts in the state of Baja California Sur.

It elects one deputy to the lower house of Congress for each three-year legislative session by means of the first-past-the-post system. Votes cast in the district also count towards the calculation of proportional representation ("plurinominal") deputies elected from the first region.

The district was created in 1974 when Baja California Sur acquired statehood and was first contended in the 1976 general election. The current member for the district, elected in the 2024 general election, is Luis Armando Díaz of the Labour Party (PT).

== District territory ==
Under the 2023 districting plan adopted by the National Electoral Institute (INE), which is to be used for the 2024, 2027 and 2030 federal elections, the second district comprises the 164 electoral precincts (secciones electorales) that make up the municipality of Los Cabos at the state's southern tip.

The district's head town (cabecera distrital), where results from individual polling stations are gathered together and tallied, is the city of San José del Cabo. The district reported a population of 351,100 in the 2020 census.

== Previous districting schemes ==
Evolution of electoral district numbers
	1974	1978	1996	2005	2017	2023
Baja California Sur	2	2	2	2	2	2
Chamber of Deputies	196	300				

2017–2022

From 2017 to 2022, the district comprised the municipality of Los Cabos and the southern portion of the municipality of La Paz. San José del Cabo was the head town.

2005–2017

Between 2005 and 2017 the district covered the municipality of Los Cabos and the easternmost third of the municipality of La Paz. The district's head town was the state capital, La Paz.

1996–2005

The municipalities of Los Cabos and La Paz, with the state capital serving as the head town.

1978–1996

The districting scheme in force from 1978 to 1996 was the result of the 1977 electoral reforms, which increased the number of single-member seats in the Chamber of Deputies from 196 to 300. Baja California Sur's seat allocation, however, remained unchanged at two. The 2nd district had its head town at Mulegé and it covered the municipalities of Mulegé and Comondú.

== Deputies returned to Congress ==
(Mexico) National parties
- Current
- PAN
- PRI
- PT
- PVEM
- MC
- Morena
- PAZ
- Somos
- Defunct or local only
- PLM
- PNR
- PRM
- PNM
- PP
- PPS
- PARM
- PFCRN
- CON
- PANAL
- PSD
- PES
- PES
- PRD

Baja California Sur's 2nd district
Election	Deputy	Party	Term	Legislature
1976	Agapito Duarte Hernández		1976–1979	50th Congress
1979	Ramón Ojeda Suárez		1979–1982	51st Congress
1982	Alberto Miranda Castro		1982–1985	52nd Congress
1985	Eligio Soto López		1985–1988	53rd Congress
1988	Antonio Manríquez Guluarte		1988–1991	54th Congress
1991	Mario Vargas Aguilar		1991–1994	55th Congress
1994	Rodimiro Amaya Téllez		1994–1997	56th Congress
1997	Antonio Manríquez Guluarte		1997–2000	57th Congress
2000	Rosa Delia Cota Montaño		2000–2003	58th Congress
2003	Narciso Agúndez Montaño (Note: Resigned his seat on 21/08/2004.); Josefina Cota Cota		2003–2004; 2004–2006	59th Congress
2006	Víctor Manuel Lizárraga Peraza		2006–2009	60th Congress
2009	Víctor Manuel Castro Cosío		2009–2012	61st Congress
2012	Arturo de la Rosa Escalante	National Action Party (Mexico)	2012–2015	62nd Congress
2015	Víctor Ernesto Ibarra Montoya	National Action Party (Mexico)	2015–2018	63rd Congress
2018	Alfredo Porras Domínguez		2018–2021	64th Congress
2021	Alfredo Porras Domínguez		2021–2024	65th Congress
2024	Luis Armando Díaz	Labour Party (Mexico)	2024–2027	66th Congress

== Presidential elections ==
Baja California Sur's 2nd district
Election	District won by	Party or coalition	%
2018	Andrés Manuel López Obrador	Juntos Haremos Historia	67.4681
2024	Claudia Sheinbaum Pardo	Sigamos Haciendo Historia	62.9074
