= Rosa Delia Cota Montaño =

Mexican politician (born 1951)

Member of the Congress of Baja California Sur Plurinominal
- In office 1 September 2015 – 31 August 2018

Municipal president of La Paz
- In office 2008–2011
- Preceded by: Víctor Manuel Castro Cosío
- Succeeded by: Esthela Ponce Beltrán

Member of the Chamber of Deputies for Baja California Sur′s 2nd district
- In office 1 September 2000 – 31 August 2003
- Preceded by: Antonio Manríquez Guluarte
- Succeeded by: Narciso Agúndez Montaño

Personal details
- Born: 23 April 1951 (age 75) Santiago, Baja California Sur, Mexico
- Party: Independent; PRD (until 2017); PT (former)
- Relatives: Leonel Cota Montaño (brother)
- Occupation: Politician

Rosa Delia Cota Montaño (born 23 April 1951) is a Mexican politician.

== Biography ==
From 2000 to 2003 she served as a federal deputy of the LVIII Legislature of the Mexican Congress representing Baja California Sur as a member of the Labor Party.

Cota Montaño served in the XIV Legislature of the Congress of Baja California Sur via proportional representation as the sole PRD deputy. In May 2017, she threatened to leave the PRD amidst discussions between party president Alejandra Barrales with the National Action Party (PAN) to form a coalition in the 2018 elections. Cota Montaño criticized the state party leader, Jesús Druk González, for endorsing the decision without consulting local party members. She said that she did not want to see the PRD become a "PAN satellite" like the Ecologist Green Party of Mexico (PVEM) or the New Alliance Party (PANAL).

Cota Montaño officially left the PRD in October 2017, declaring herself an independent at a session of congress.
