= Josefina Cota Cota =

Mexican politician

Member of the Senate for Baja California Sur
- In office 1 September 2006 – 31 August 2012
- Preceded by: Ricardo Gerardo Higuera
- Succeeded by: Isaías González Cuevas

Member of the Chamber of Deputies for Baja California Sur′s 2nd district
- In office 19 October 2004 – 31 August 2006
- Preceded by: Narciso Agúndez Montaño
- Succeeded by: Víctor Manuel Lizárraga

Personal details
- Born: 3 June 1956 (age 70) La Paz, Baja California Sur, Mexico
- Party: PRD
- Occupation: Senator

Josefina Cota Cota (born 3 June 1956) is a Mexican politician affiliated with the PRD. She served as Senator of the LX and LXI Legislatures of the Mexican Congress representing Baja California Sur. She previously served in the Congress of Baja California Sur from 1987 to 1991.
