= Jerónimo de la Rosa Gómez =

Mexican politician

Member of the Congress of Baja California Sur from the 7th district
- In office 1 April 1987 – 30 March 1990
- Preceded by: Benito Bermúdez Coronado
- Succeeded by: Franco Domínguez Verduzco

Personal details
- Died: 31 December 1988
- Citizenship: Mexican
- Party: PRI
- Spouse: Dolores Escalante

Jerónimo de la Rosa Gómez (died 31 December 1988) was a Mexican politician and trade unionist. He served in the V Legislature of the Congress of Baja California Sur from 1987 to 1990 as a member of the Institutional Revolutionary Party (PRI). He also served as the leader of the Confederation of Mexican Workers (CTM) at the state level.

De la Rosa died on 31 December 1988. His family became heavily involved in the political scene of Baja California Sur. His son, Arturo, served as a federal deputy in the LXII Legislature of the Mexican Congress. Another son, Noé, became the statewide president of the Party of the Democratic Revolution (PRD) in 2020. Other sons include Benjamín, who ran for Governor of Baja California Sur in 2015 and 2021, and José Alfredo.
