= Rodimiro Amaya Téllez =

Mexican politician (born 1954)

- Born: 7 October 1954 (age 71); Etchojoa, Sonora, Mexico
- Occupation: Politician
- Political party: PRI (1994–2000; 2005–present); PRD (2000–05)

Rodimiro Amaya Téllez (born 7 October 1954) is a Mexican politician affiliated with the Institutional Revolutionary Party (PRI). As of 2014 he served as Senator of the LVIII and LIX Legislatures of the Mexican Congress representing Baja California Sur. He also served as deputy during the LVI Legislature.

In 2000, after being elected in the Senate he resigned as member of the PRI to later affiliate to the Party of the Democratic Revolution (PRD), in 2005 he tried to be candidate for the governor of his state, but accused the then governor Leonel Cota Montaño to promote the candidature of his cousin Narciso Agúndez Montaño and resigned from the PRD.
