= Araceli Niño López =

Mexican politician

Member of the Congress of Baja California Sur from the 10th district
- In office 1 September 2015 – 31 August 2018
- Preceded by: Adela González Moreno
- Succeeded by: Soledad Saldaña Bañalez

Personal details
- Born: Cintalapa, Chiapas, Mexico
- Citizenship: Mexico
- Party: PAN
- Spouse: Marco Antonio Chavira Martínez (died 1994)
- Children: 2
- Education: National Autonomous University of Mexico
- Occupation: Doctor

Araceli Niño López is Mexican politician representing the National Action Party (PAN). A doctor by profession, she served in the XIV Legislature of the Congress of Baja California Sur from 2015 to 2018.

== Early life ==
Born in Cintalapa, Chiapas, Niño López studied medicine at the National Autonomous University of Mexico (UNAM), graduating in 1974. She married UNAM veterinarian student Marco Antonio Chavira Martínez, and moved with him to his native Baja California Sur in 1978, where she remained for the rest of her life after having two children. As a doctor in Comondú, she was an active member of the community, serving as president of the Mexican Red Cross. In 2012 she was nominated for the "María Dionisia Villarino Espinoza" medal for her social work with women in the state.

== Political career ==
Niño López began her political career in local government, serving as both a regidora and director of public security for Comondú Municipality. In the 2015 elections, she won a seat representing the 10th district in the XIV Legislature of the Congress of Baja California Sur, where she served as head of the Committee for Health, Families and Public Assistance (Comisión de la Salud, la Familia y la Asistencia Pública). In March 2018 she requested and was granted a temporary release from her duties to begin campaigning for another office during the 2018 elections. She ran as a candidate for municipal president of Comondú, losing to José Walter Valenzuela Acosta.
