= Ricardo Velázquez Meza =

Mexican politician (born 1971)

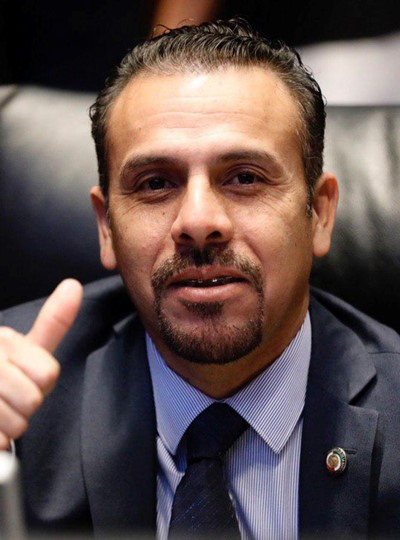
- Ricardo Velázquez Meza

Senator of the Congress of the Union for Baja California Sur
- Incumbent
- Assumed office 6 December 2018 Serving with Lucía Trasviña and Guadalupe Saldaña Cisneros
- Preceded by: Víctor Manuel Castro Cosío

Personal details
- Born: 13 September 1971 (age 53); Palo Verde, Baja California Sur, Mexico
- Political party: Morena
- Education: UAA; La Concordia University
- Occupation: Politician

Ricardo Velázquez Meza (born 13 September 1971) is a Mexican politician affiliated with the National Regeneration Movement (Morena) party. Since December 6, 2018, he has been a senator of the republic representing the state of Baja California Sur in the LXIV Legislature of the Congress of the Union.

== Early years ==
Ricardo Velázquez Meza was born in Palo Verde, Mulegé Municipality, Baja California Sur. He is the son of Manuel Velázquez Rodríguez and Bárbara Meza Ramírez. He studied law at the Autonomous University of Baja California from 1986 to 1989. He was a professor at the Autonomous University of Baja California Sur. In the 2015 Baja California Sur state elections, he was nominated by the Humanist Party as state representative for the state's 13th district. Since 2016 he has been a member of the National Regeneration Movement (Morena) party.

== Senator of the Republic ==
In the 2018 federal elections, he was nominated by Morena as a substitute for Víctor Manuel Castro Cosío, candidate for first-party senator for the state of Baja California Sur. After the elections, the Castro-Velázquez formula was chosen to integrate the LXIV Legislature of the Congress of the Union. In December 2018, Castro Cosío requested a leave of absence from the position to be Coordinator of federal government programs in the state of Baja California Sur. Ricardo Velázquez Meza occupied his seat as senator of the republic as of December 6, 2018.

Within the Senate of Mexico, he is secretary of the board of directors in the third year of sessions, from August 2020 to August 2021. He is also secretary of the commission on the environment, natural resources and climate change.

== Controversies ==
On 2 March 2021, during a virtual session of the Senate established as a preventive measure against the COVID-19 pandemic in Mexico, Senator Ricardo Velázquez Meza projected a photograph of himself to simulate that he was present at the meeting held via Zoom. The fact was reported by journalist Leticia Robles through Twitter: "I thought I had seen wrong, but no. The senator of Morena, Ricardo Velázquez @BcsRicardo has a photo for virtual meetings and today he did not remove it to vote. Could it be that he uses it to pretend that he is paying attention to the electrical debate in @senadomexicano? He already left the photo. Literally: I saw him double".
