= Manuel Alejandro Cota =

Mexican politician (born 1991)

Manuel Alejandro Cota Cárdenas (born 26 December 1991) is a Mexican politician from the Ecologist Green Party of Mexico (PVEM). Born in La Paz, Baja California Sur, he is the son of Leonel Cota Montaño, governor of Baja California Sur between 1999 and 2005.

He was elected to the Chamber of Deputies for Baja California Sur's 1st district in the 2024 general election, receiving 56% of the votes cast in a three-way race. Originally elected for the National Regeneration Movement (Morena), he switched allegiance to the PVEM at the start of the congressional session.

In 2026, Morena, the PVEM's ally, announced him as the "state coordinator for the defense of the transformation and national sovereignty", a position expected to represent the party in the Baja California Sur gubernatorial election of 6 June 2027.
