= Juan Adolfo Orcí Martínez =

Mexican politician

Member of the Chamber of Deputies for Baja California Sur′s 1st district
- In office 1 September 2006 – 31 August 2009
- Preceded by: Francisco Javier Obregón
- Succeeded by: Marcos Covarrubias Villaseñor

Personal details
- Born: 4 June 1955 (age 70) Tubutama, Sonora, Mexico
- Party: PRD
- Occupation: Politician

Juan Adolfo Orcí Martínez (born 4 June 1955) is a Mexican politician affiliated with the Party of the Democratic Revolution. As of 2014 he served as Deputy of the LX Legislature of the Mexican Congress representing Baja California Sur.
