= Ciudad Constitución =

City in the Mexican state of Baja California Sur

- City
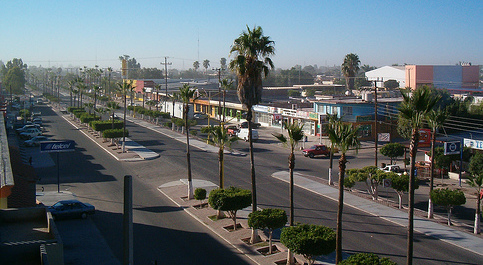
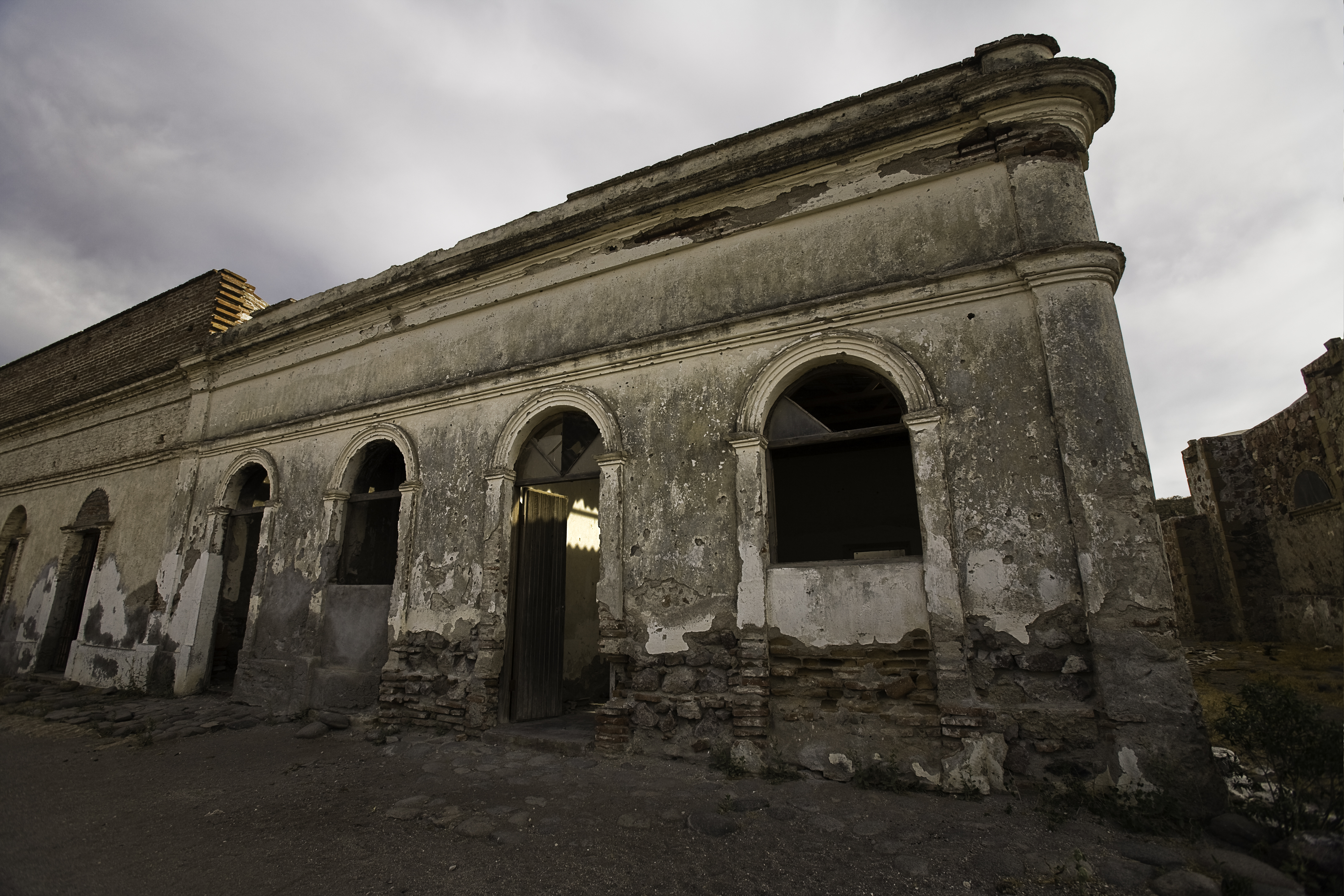
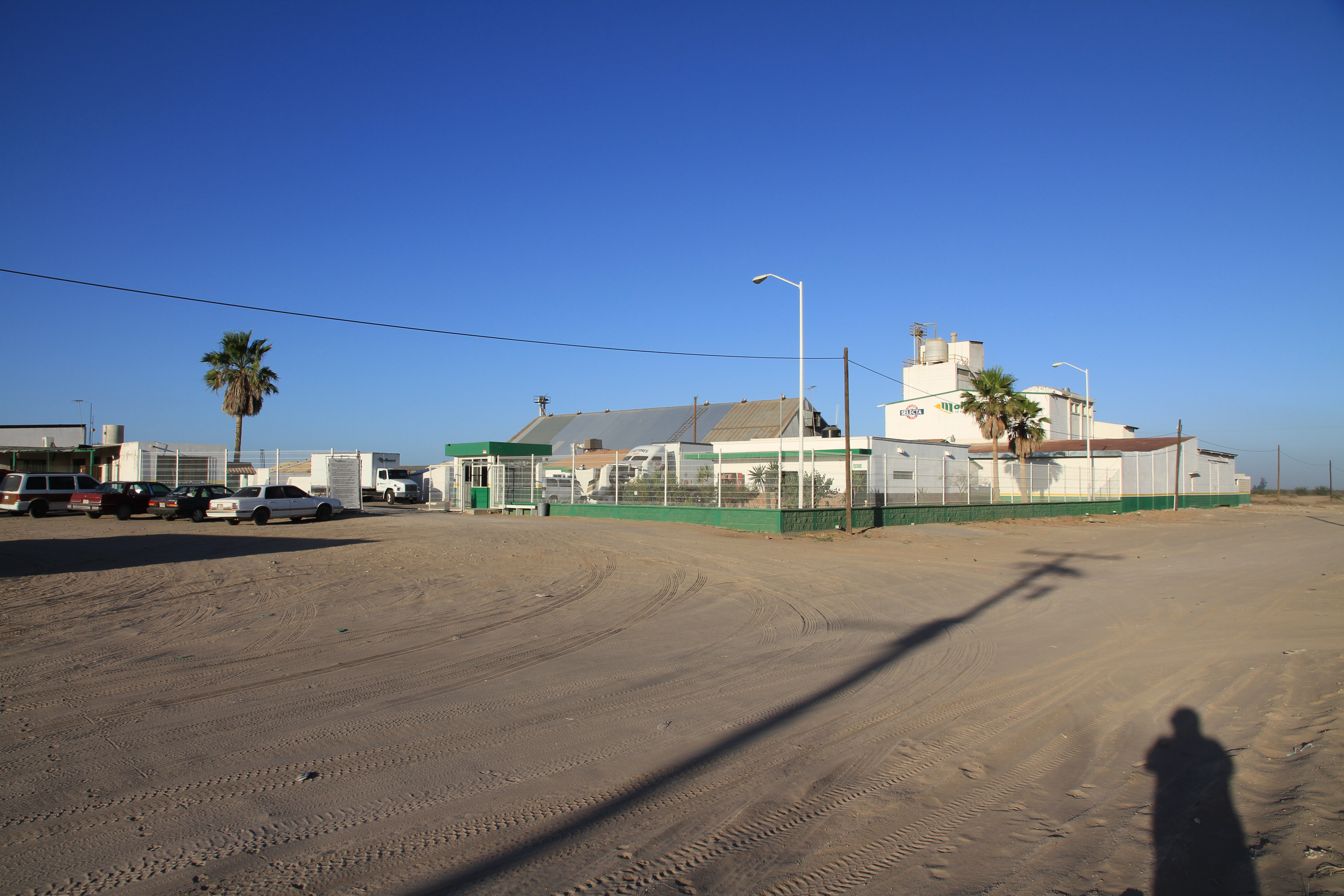
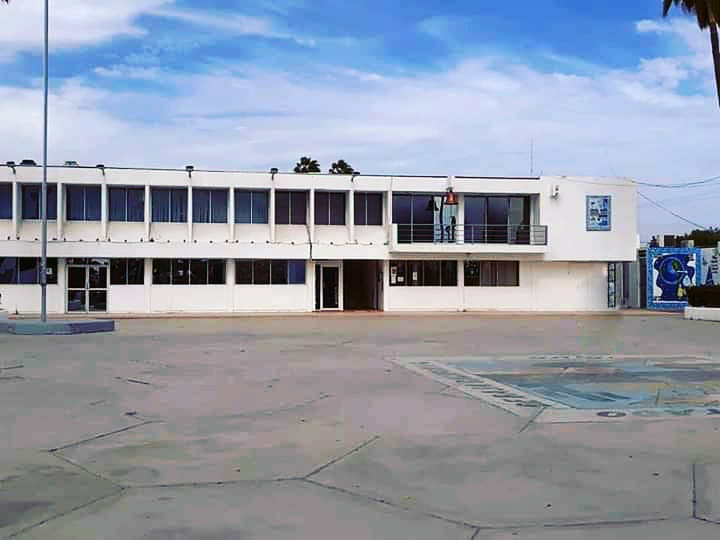
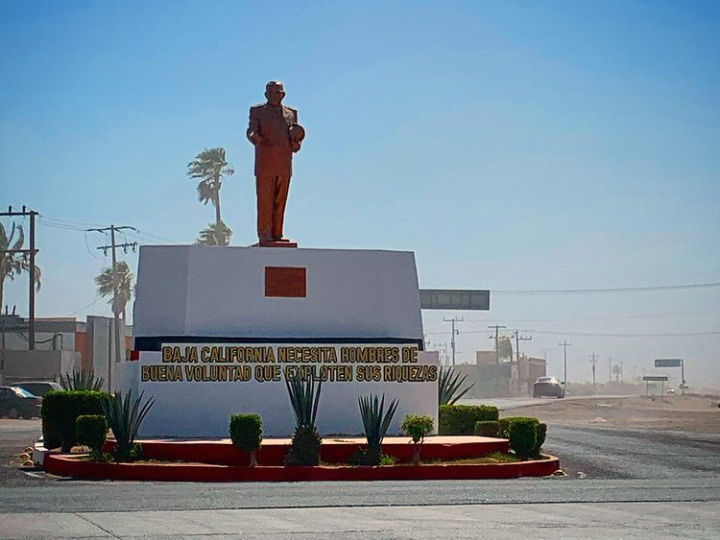
- Top: View of Ciudad Constitución from Federal Highway 1; Middle: Misión San Luis Gonzaga Chiriyaqui, Flour mill factory; Comondú City Hall, Agustín Olachea Memorial

- Location in Baja California Sur Ciudad Constitución (Mexico)
- Coordinates: 25°01′56″N 111°40′13″W
- Country: Mexico
- State: Baja California Sur
- Municipality: Comondú
- Elevation: 187 ft (57 m)

Population (2020)
  - Total: 43,805
  - Density: 160/sq mi (62/km^{2})
- Time zone: UTC−07:00 (Zona Pacífico)

Ciudad Constitución is a city in the Mexican state of Baja California Sur. It is the seat of the municipality of Comondú. As of 2020, the city had a total population of 43,805 inhabitants. Ciudad Constitución is a small city which serves as a gateway to Magdalena Bay.

== History ==
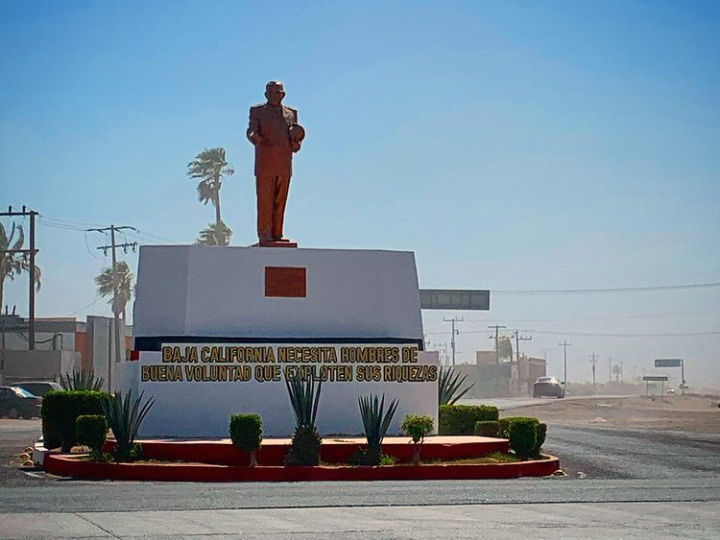
Memorial to General Agustín Olachea.

The colonization of Valle de Santo Domingo (Valley of Santo Domingo) originated around 1940. A ranch called El Crucero ("The Crossroad") was settled in a crossroad. Because of this, people started to gather around it and the population started to grow. It quickly became a commercial hub and an obligatory travel stop for all the inhabitants of Valle de Santo Domingo, as well as for people going north or south on the peninsula. Then, it became known as Villa Constitución, and later, Ciudad Constitución. Even today, many locals still call it "El Crucero". Every 5 February the city becomes the state's capital for one day. Since 1996, the Instituto Tecnológico Superior de Ciudad Constitución serves as a higher education institution.

== Geography ==
=== Climate ===
Climate data for Ciudad Constitución (1981–2000)
Month	Jan	Feb	Mar	Apr	May	Jun	Jul	Aug	Sep	Oct	Nov	Dec	Year
Record high °C (°F)	37.7 (99.9)	34.0 (93.2)	41.6 (106.9)	43.0 (109.4)	41.0 (105.8)	45.5 (113.9)	45.8 (114.4)	43.0 (109.4)	44.6 (112.3)	42.9 (109.2)	39.4 (102.9)	35.6 (96.1)	45.8 (114.4)
Mean daily maximum °C (°F)	26.3 (79.3)	28.0 (82.4)	29.3 (84.7)	31.0 (87.8)	31.6 (88.9)	34.7 (94.5)	37.3 (99.1)	37.8 (100.0)	36.3 (97.3)	34.4 (93.9)	29.9 (85.8)	26.4 (79.5)	31.9 (89.4)
Daily mean °C (°F)	17.4 (63.3)	18.7 (65.7)	19.7 (67.5)	21.3 (70.3)	22.4 (72.3)	25.2 (77.4)	28.7 (83.7)	29.7 (85.5)	28.6 (83.5)	25.6 (78.1)	21.0 (69.8)	18.0 (64.4)	23.0 (73.4)
Mean daily minimum °C (°F)	8.5 (47.3)	9.3 (48.7)	10.1 (50.2)	11.6 (52.9)	13.3 (55.9)	15.6 (60.1)	20.2 (68.4)	21.7 (71.1)	21.0 (69.8)	16.7 (62.1)	12.0 (53.6)	9.6 (49.3)	14.1 (57.4)
Record low °C (°F)	−4.7 (23.5)	1.0 (33.8)	0.4 (32.7)	2.7 (36.9)	4.0 (39.2)	6.2 (43.2)	11.5 (52.7)	15.8 (60.4)	6.5 (43.7)	4.0 (39.2)	2.4 (36.3)	0.7 (33.3)	−4.7 (23.5)
Average precipitation mm (inches)	12.9 (0.51)	4.8 (0.19)	2.6 (0.10)	1.1 (0.04)	0.1 (0.00)	0.1 (0.00)	15.6 (0.61)	32.5 (1.28)	30.0 (1.18)	2.6 (0.10)	11.1 (0.44)	27.1 (1.07)	140.6 (5.54)
Average precipitation days (≥ 0.1 mm)	1.1	1.4	0.6	0.3	0.1	0.1	1.3	3.2	3.4	0.6	1.4	2.3	15.7
Average relative humidity (%)	68	67	66	65	66	65	64	64	69	66	66	68	66
Mean monthly sunshine hours	239	233	275	287	320	326	308	292	266	281	242	227	3,296
Source 1: Servicio Meteorológico Nacional
Source 2: Ogimet (sun 1981–2010)

== Demographics ==
As of 2020, the city had a total population of 43,805 inhabitants. It is the fourth-largest community in the state (behind La Paz, Cabo San Lucas, and San José del Cabo,. Ciudad Constitución is a small city which serves as a gateway to Magdalena Bay. It is also close to the Baja 1000 course.

Historical population
Year	Pop.	±%
1995	33,948	—
2000	35,589	+4.8%
2005	37,220	+4.6%
2010	40,935	+10.0%
2015	44,918	+9.7%
2020	43,805	−2.5%
		—

== Economy ==
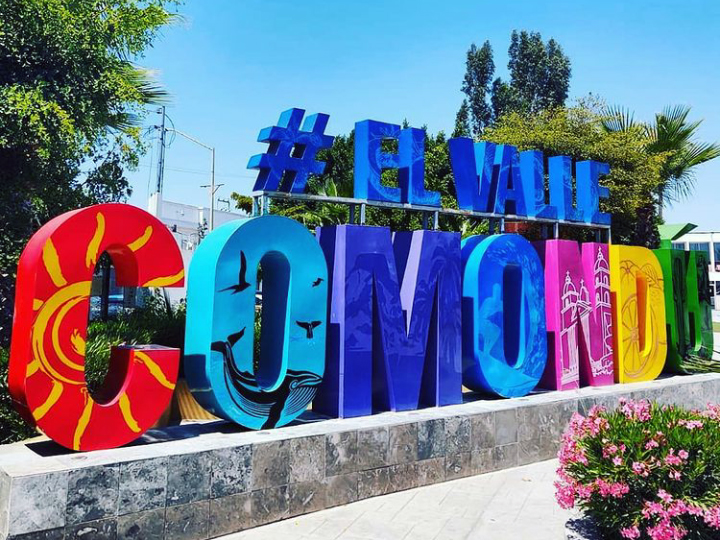
El Valle Comondú sign.

Ciudad Constitución's mainstay is the cultivation of wheat, chickpea, cotton, asparagus, citrus, and vegetables, among other crops. The city also has a dairy products processing plant (pasteurized milk, yogurt, fruit beverages): "Unión de Ejidos 20 de Noviembre". Ciudad Constitución has a few small hotels, supermarkets, gas stations, etc. The Mexican long distance area code for the municipalities of Comondú and Loreto is 613. Internet access is possible in cybercafes through the city's downtown, as well as by dial-up access from regular landlines. Communication with remote areas of Valle de Santo Domingo, nearby islands, and other remote regions of the municipality of Comondú is mainly possible by means of a local AM radio station (XEVSD 1440 kHz).

== Transportation ==
For air travel, the city is served by the Ciudad Constitución Airport, which is a small airfield where two regional airlines provide service to Los Mochis and Ciudad Obregón. The airport also handles air taxi service. The city's nearest major airports are located in Loreto (Loreto International Airport), La Paz (Manuel Márquez de León International Airport) and San José del Cabo (Los Cabos International Airport). Small aircraft make use of local dirt runaways. Autotransportes Águila is a bus line which covers all the length of the Baja California Peninsula, mainly along Federal Highway 1 (also known as "Carretera Transpeninsular"), and has an office in Ciudad Constitución.

== Notable people ==
- Rogelio Martínez Santillán, politician who served in the Congress of Baja California Sur
- Arturo de la Rosa Escalante, politician who served in the Chamber of Deputies
