= Víctor Manuel Castro Cosío =

Governor of Baja California Sur

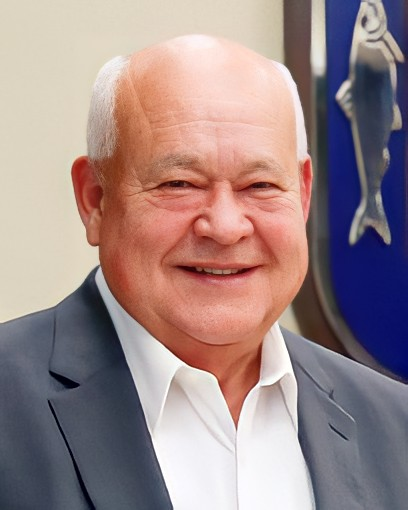
- Official portrait, 2022

Governor of Baja California Sur
- Incumbent
- Assumed office 10 September 2021
- Preceded by: Carlos Mendoza Davis

Senator of the Congress of the Union for Baja California Sur
- In office 1 September 2018 – 2 December 2018
- Preceded by: Ricardo Barroso Agramont
- Succeeded by: Ricardo Velázquez Meza

Member of the Chamber of Deputies for Baja California Sur's 2nd district
- In office 1 September 2009 – 31 August 2012
- Preceded by: Víctor Manuel Lizárraga
- Succeeded by: Arturo de la Rosa Escalante

Municipal president of La Paz
- In office 30 April 2005 – 29 April 2008
- Preceded by: Víctor Guluarte Castro
- Succeeded by: Rosa Delia Cota Montaño

Personal details
- Born: 14 June 1955 (age 71) La Paz, Baja California Sur, Mexico
- Party: Morena (since 2014)
- Other political affiliations: Party of the Democratic Revolution (1989–2014)
- Occupation: Politician

Víctor Manuel Castro Cosío (born 14 June 1955) is a Mexican politician currently affiliated with the National Regeneration Movement. He is the governor of Baja California Sur.

== Life ==
Castro became a teacher and member of the SNTE teachers' union at 19, teaching middle school classes in civic education, history, Spanish and philosophy. Castro also affiliated with the Workers' Revolutionary Party, an early left-wing political party; he sat on its Political State Committee between 1980 and 1984, and on its national central committee between 1986 and 1989.

By 1999, Castro had changed his party affiliation to the Party of the Democratic Revolution, and when it came into power, Castro left teaching to head up a middle school in Baja California Sur. In 2002, he was named the state secretary of public education, a post he would hold for two years. In 2005, he ran successfully for municipal president of La Paz, serving simultaneously on the PRD's state council. After his term as mayor ended, he ran for and won election as a federal deputy to the LXI Legislature of the Mexican Congress, representing the second district of Baja California Sur, including La Paz. He sat on six normal commissions, including three secretarial posts, during his three years in San Lázaro.

In 2015, Castro departed from the PRD and ran as the Morena candidate in the Baja California Sur gubernatorial election of that year, finishing fourth with 6.41 percent of the vote as the state reaffirmed its shift to PAN dominance by re-electing that party in the person of Carlos Mendoza Davis.

In December 2017, Castro announced his intention to seek the Morena nomination for Senate in 2018. On election day, the Juntos Haremos Historia ticket of Castro and Lucía Trasviña Waldenrath placed first, sending both candidates to the Senate. However, on 12 July 2018, president-elect Andrés Manuel López Obrador announced that Castro would be named a state-level coordinator in the new federal government when López Obrador takes office on 1 December; his alternate, Ricardo Velázquez Meza, would serve as senator in his stead. He resigned on October 31, 2020 to seek the candidacy of Morena for the Governorship of Baja California Sur.

== Governor of Baja California Sur ==
On 6 June 2021, Castro was elected Governor of Baja California Sur winning between 44.0% to 46.8% of the vote. Castro defeated National Action Party (Mexico) candidate Francisco Pelayo Covarrubias.

Political offices
Preceded by Víctor Guluarte Castro	Municipal President of La Paz; 2005–2008	Succeeded by Rosa Delia Cota Montaño
Preceded by Carlos Mendoza Davis	Governor of Baja California Sur; 2021–present	Incumbent
Chamber of Deputies (Mexico)
Preceded by Víctor Manuel Lizárraga Peraza	Member of the Chamber of Deputies for Baja California Sur's 2nd District; 2009–2012	Succeeded by Arturo de la Rosa Escalante
