= Nuestra Belleza Baja California Sur 2012 =

- Date: June 23, 2012
- Presenters: Karina González, Jan
- Venue: Balneario de Coromuel, La Paz, Baja California Sur
- Broadcaster: Televisa
- Entrants: 8
- Placements: 4
- Winner: Diana Castro; La Paz

Nuestra Belleza Baja California Sur 2012, was held at the Balneario de Coromuel of La Paz, Baja California Sur on June 23, 2012. At the conclusion of the final night of competition Diana Castro from La Paz was crowned the winner. Castro was crowned by outgoing Nuestra Belleza Baja California Sur and Nuestra Belleza Internacional México 2012 Jessica García Formenti. Eight contestants competed for the title.

== Results ==
=== Placements ===
Final results	Contestant
Nuestra Belleza Baja California Sur 2012	Diana Castro
Suplente / 1st Runner-up	Alicia Lucero
2nd Runner-up	Diana Ramírez
3rd Runner-up	Johana Guerrero

=== Special awards ===
Award	Contestant
Miss Photogenic	Estefanía Carreras
Miss Congeniality	Johana Guerrero
Miss Elegance	Diana Ramírez
Best Body	Karen González
Best Virtual Skin	Alicia Lucero

== Judges ==
- Mariano Ruang
- Felipe Marcos
- Gabriela Carvajal - Public Relations Coordinator at Televisa
- Dr. Enrique Estrada
- Ana Laura Corral - National Coordinator of Nuestra Belleza México
- Oscar del Toro
- Carla Estrada - TV Producer
- Carlo Antonio Rico - TV Producer

== Contestants ==
Hometown	Contestant	Age	Height (m)
Chametla	Karen Sarahí González Mercado	20	1.78
Comondú	Johana Guerrero	18	1.74
El Triunfo	Karla Estefani Carreras	18	1.73
La Paz	Diana Kristal Castro Castro	19	1.82
Los Cabos	Gabriela María Aviles Ceseña	20	1.72
Los Planes	Alicia Vianney Lucero	19	1.75
San Antonio	Diana Patricia Ramírez Lara	19	1.73
Todos los Santos	Aimee Alejandra Misquez Campa	20	1.74
