= El Centenario =

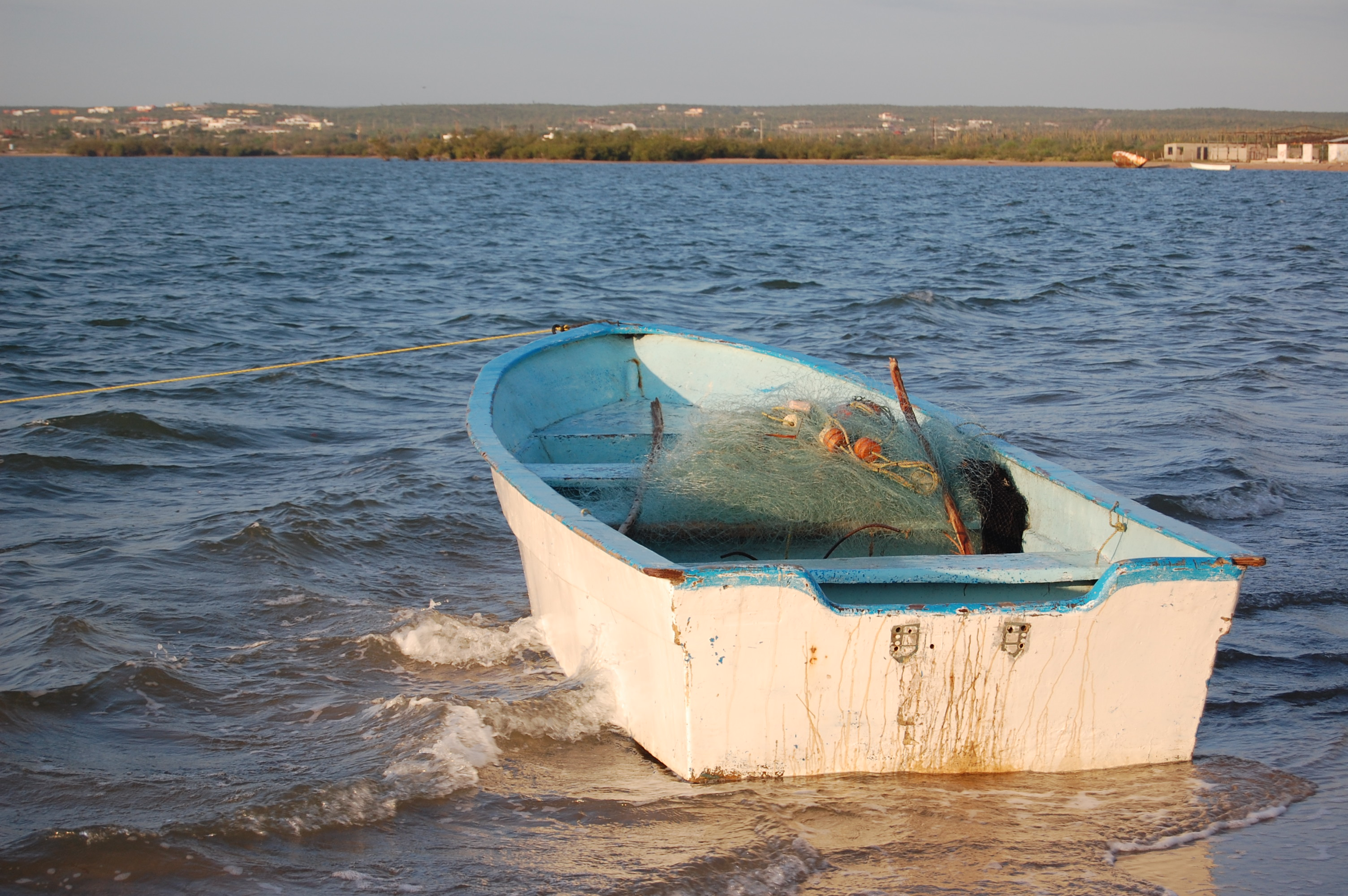
- El Centenario Hillside, From The Beach

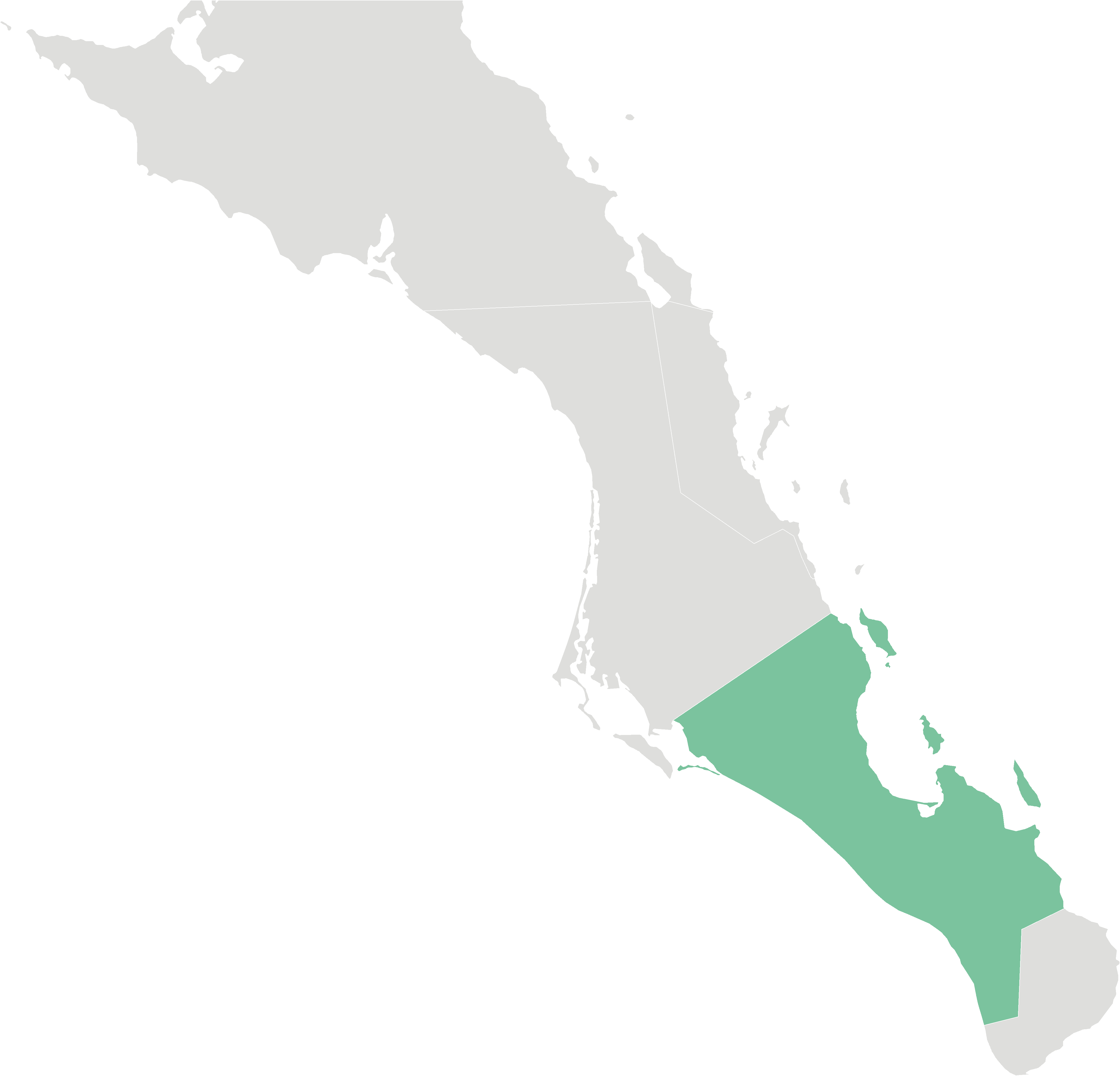
- Location of El Centenario in Baja California Sur

- Location within Mexico
- Coordinates: 24°06′09″N 110°24′52″W
- Country: Mexico
- State: Baja California Sur
- Founded: 1965
- Elevation: 6 m (20 ft)

Population (2020)
  - Total: 6,221
- Time zone: UTC-7 (Mountain Time)
- Website: http://www.lapaz.gob.mx

El Centenario is a small seaside town located in La Paz Municipality, Baja California Sur, Mexico, approximately 15 km west of La Paz, the capital city. El Centenario had a 2020 census population of 6,221 persons.

Since its establishment, El Centenario has grown as a suburb of La Paz. The majority of the working residents commute to La Paz or the surrounding areas. In recent years, El Centenario has become a favorite location for United States and Canadian citizens to build new houses, either as vacation homes or as primary residences for retirement. The lower cost of living, when compared to the U.S., especially California or Florida, plus the rapid modernization of Baja California Sur, has made it an increasingly viable alternative to retire. New neighborhoods with growing English-speaking populations include Lomas del Centenario and Haciendas Palo Verde.

== History ==
El Centenario was founded in the 1960s as an agrarian/fishing ejido by approximately 25 founding families. Each of the original families was delegated land to use for farming and on which to build a dwelling, while the land remained under the ownership of the communal ejido. During the 1990s, due to reforms associated with the North American Free Trade Agreement, Mexican ejidos were granted rights to deliver legal ownership of ejido land to the members, thus changing from communal ownership to private ownership.

== Local tradition ==
El Centenario locals eat nopal cacti as a main ingredient in tacos, which is unique in the La Paz area. This tradition was brought to El Centenario by the founding families when they moved from the interior of the Baja Peninsula, where eating nopal is more common. In early fall, El Centenario holds a town nopal-themed festival. A carnival with rides and games is set up in the town center. A nopal cooking competition is organized by the BEDR 55 (Brigada de Educacion para el Desarrollo Rural No. 55) every year in early autumn (October).

El Centenario is the town closest to CIBNOR, one of the leading marine biology institutes in Latin America. CIBNOR conducts studies of the Gulf of California ecosystem (also known as the Sea of Cortez), which is one of the most biologically diverse bodies of water in the world.

== Climate ==
The general year-round climate in El Centenario is similar to that of La Paz, Baja California Sur, and is generally warm, sunny, and dry. The months of July, August, and September are the warmest and most humid, with August and September being the most likely months to receive heavy rainfall.

One local weather phenomenon is the Coromuel Wind, which is a steady breeze that blows consistently during late afternoons in El Centenario. The winds are created when the cool marine air from the Pacific side of the peninsula is drawn over the desert to the relatively warmer side of the Gulf of California. Unlike most other parts of the Baja peninsula, there are no high mountains to block this air movement between the two sides of the peninsula.
