= Tecolote Beach =

Beach in Mexico

Coordinates: 24°20′N 110°19′W

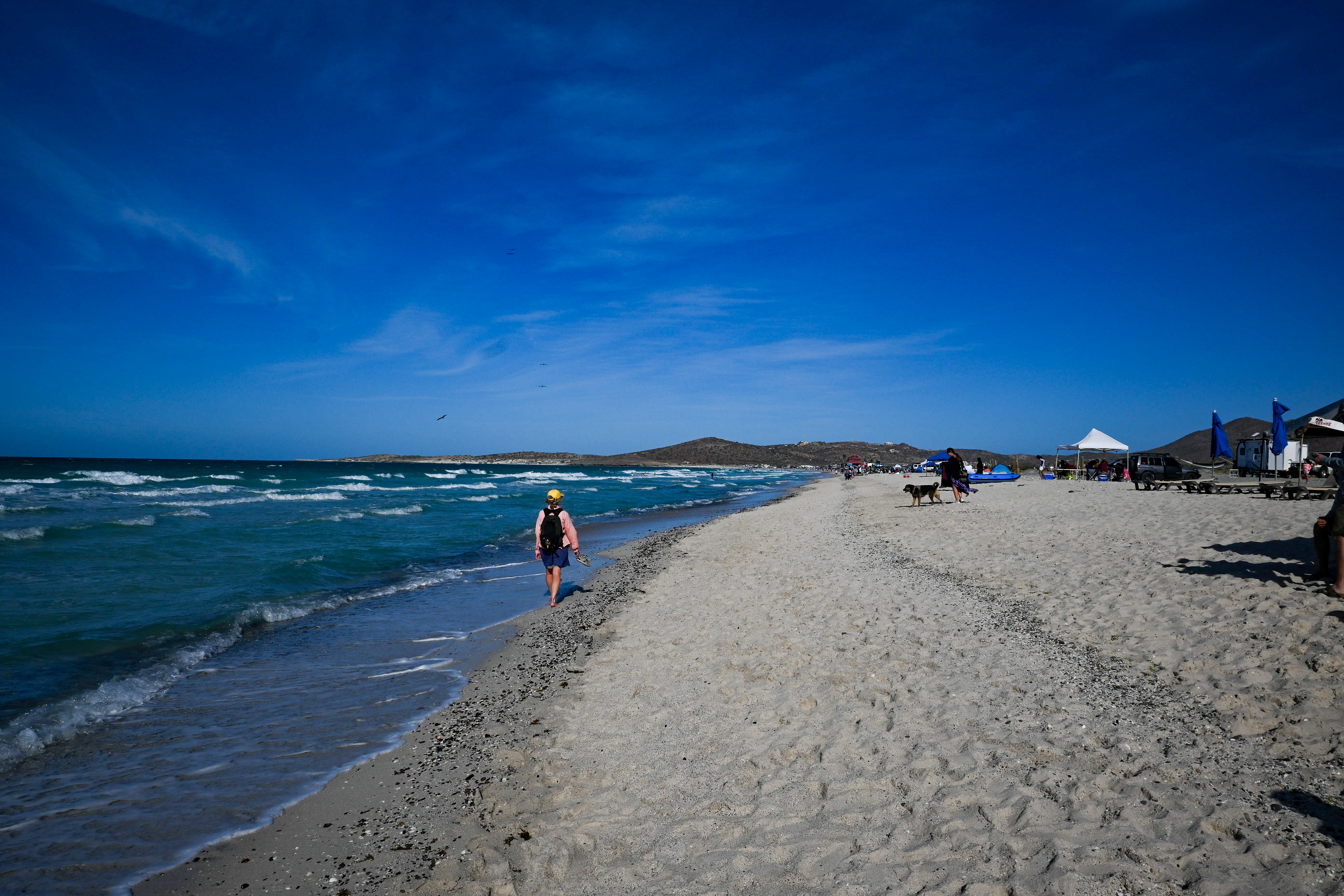
Tecolote Beach, La Paz, Baja California Sur, Mexico.

Tecolote Beach is an isolated beach community located in the municipality of La Paz in the state of Baja California Sur, it is 25 km from the city of La Paz, past Puerto Balandra, on State Highway 11.

It is one of the most extensive of the beaches in this area with fine, white sand gentle waves and little undertow. Water skiing and jet skiing are available here as well as a boat that goes to Isla Espíritu Santo.
