= Ricardo Barroso Agramont =

Mexican politician and lawyer

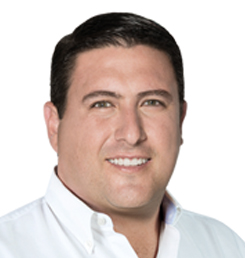

Member of the Senate of the Republic
- In office 1 September 2012 – 31 August 2018
- Preceded by: Francisco Javier Obregón Espinoza
- Succeeded by: Víctor Manuel Castro Cosío
- Constituency: Baja California Sur

Personal details
- Born: 29 February 1980 (age 46) La Paz, Baja California Sur, Mexico
- Party: Citizens' Movement (since 2025)
- Other political affiliations: Institutional Revolutionary Party (1998–2025)
- Spouse: Angelina Mendoza Arnáu (m. 2011)

Ricardo Barroso Agramont (born 29 February 1980) is a Mexican politician and lawyer affiliated with the PRI. He currently serves as Senator of the LXII Legislature of the Mexican Congress representing Baja California Sur. He was also candidate for Governor of Baja California Sur in 2011.
