= Melitón Albáñez Domínguez, Baja California Sur =

Melitón Albáñez Domínguez
- village
- Location in Mexico Melitón Albáñez Domínguez (Mexico)
- Coordinates: 23°39′41″N 110°25′15″W
- Country: Mexico
- State: Baja California Sur
- Municipality: La Paz
- Elevation: 35 m (115 ft)

Population (2015)
  - Total: 2,140

Melitón Albáñez Domínguez is a small village and ejido in Baja California Sur in La Paz Municipality. The village had a population of 2,409 as of 2020.
