= Arturo de la Rosa Escalante =

Mexican politician (born 1971)

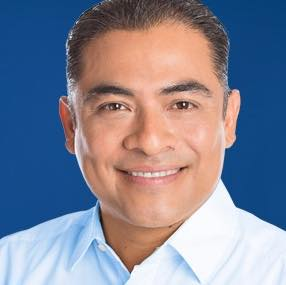
- 2014 photo

Deputy of the Congress of the Union for the 2nd district of Baja California Sur
- In office 1 September 2012 – 31 August 2015
- Preceded by: Víctor Manuel Castro Cosío
- Succeeded by: Víctor Ernesto Ibarra Montoya

Personal details
- Born: 4 May 1971 (age 55) Ciudad Constitución, Baja California Sur, Mexico
- Party: PAN
- Parent: Jerónimo de la Rosa Gómez (father)
- Education: Universidad Internacional de La Paz
- Occupation: Deputy

Arturo de la Rosa Escalante (born 4 May 1971) is a Mexican politician affiliated with the PAN. He currently serves as Deputy of the LXII Legislature of the Mexican Congress representing Baja California Sur. He subsequently served as municipal president of Los Cabos. He is the son of Jerónimo de la Rosa Gómez.

A native of Ciudad Constitución, de la Rosa attended secondary school in La Paz and a preparatoria in Toluca before earning his law degree from the Universidad Internacional de La Paz.
