= Víctor Manuel Lizárraga Peraza =

Mexican politician

Member of the Chamber of Deputies for Baja California Sur′s 2nd district
- In office 1 September 2006 – 31 August 2009
- Preceded by: Josefina Cota Cota
- Succeeded by: Víctor Manuel Castro Cosío

Personal details
- Born: 10 September 1955 (age 70) Baja California Sur, Mexico
- Party: PRD
- Occupation: Politician

Víctor Manuel Lizárraga Peraza (born 10 September 1955) is a Mexican politician affiliated with the Party of the Democratic Revolution. As of 2014 he served as Deputy of the LX Legislature of the Mexican Congress representing Baja California Sur.
