= Ricardo Gerardo Higuera =

Mexican politician

- Born: 1 May 1958 (age 68); Comondú, Baja California Sur, Mexico
- Education: Degree in Economics. Master's Degree in Public Administration. Diploma in International Business Relations.
- Alma mater: UABCS INAP University of Washington
- Occupation: Politician
- Political party: MORENA
- Spouse: Alma Luz Barbosa Betancourt

Ricardo Gerardo Higuera (born 1 May 1958) is a Mexican politician affiliated with the Morena Political Party. He served as Senator of the LVIII and LIX Legislatures of the Mexican Congress representing Baja California Sur.

Higuera has been the head of the Consulate of Mexico in Boise, Idaho, since at least 2020.
