= Silvia Puppo Gastélum =

Mexican politician

- Born: 23 November 1956 (age 69); San José del Cabo, Baja California Sur, Mexico
- Occupation: Politician
- Political party: PRD

Silvia Puppo Gastélum (born 23 November 1956) is a Mexican politician from the Party of the Democratic Revolution. From 2010 to 2012 she served as a deputy during the LXI Legislature of the Mexican Congress, representing Baja California Sur's first district.
