= Lucía Trasviña =

Mexican politician

Senator of the Congress of the Union for Baja California Sur
- Incumbent
- Assumed office 1 September 2018 Serving with Ricardo Velázquez Meza and Guadalupe Saldaña Cisneros
- Preceded by: Isaías González Cuevas

Personal details
- Party: Morena
- Occupation: Politician

Jesús Lucía Trasviña Waldenrath (born 23 December 1954) is a Mexican politician from the National Regeneration Movement (MORENA).

She has been a Senator for Baja California Sur since the 2018 general election. She won re-election in the 2024 Senate election, occupying the first place on the Sigamos Haciendo Historia coalition's two-name formula.
