= Francisco Javier Obregón Espinoza =

Mexican politician

Member of the Senate for Baja California Sur
- In office 1 September 2006 – 31 August 2012

Member of the Chamber of Deputies for Baja California Sur′s 1st district
- In office 1 September 2003 – 31 August 2006
- Preceded by: Miguel Vega Pérez
- Succeeded by: Juan Adolfo Orcí Martínez

Municipal president of Comondú
- In office 1999–2002
- Preceded by: Ricardo Garza Espíritu
- Succeeded by: Javier Gallo Reyna

Member of the Congress of Baja California Sur from the 9th district
- In office 15 March 1996 – 14 March 1999
- Preceded by: Jesús Ochoa Galván
- Succeeded by: Soledad Saldaña Bañales

Personal details
- Born: 28 January 1958 (age 68) Palo Bola, Baja California Sur, Mexico
- Party: PAN; PRD

Francisco Javier Obregón Espinoza (born 28 January 1958) is a Mexican politician affiliated with the Party of the Democratic Revolution (PRD). He has also worked with the Labor Party. He served as Senator of the LX and LXI Legislatures of the Mexican Congress, representing Baja California Sur. He also served as Deputy during the LIX Legislature.
