= Carlos Mendoza Davis =

Mexican politician (born 1969)

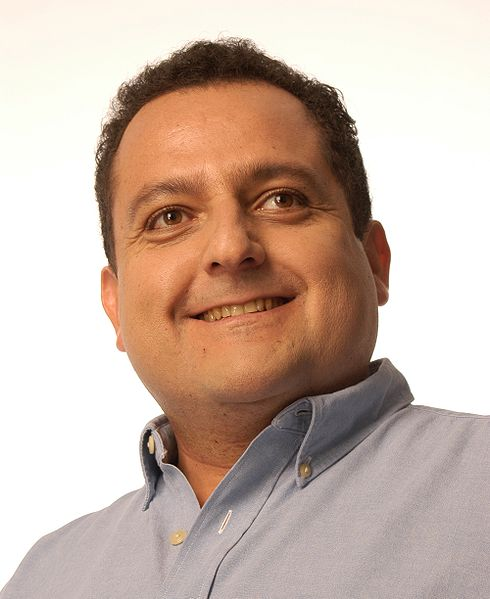
- Carlos Mendoza Davis

Governor of Baja California Sur
- In office 10 September 2015 – 9 September 2021
- Preceded by: Marcos Covarrubias Villaseñor
- Succeeded by: Víctor Manuel Castro Cosío

Senator for Baja California Sur
- In office 1 September 2012 – 11 December 2014
- Preceded by: Luis Coppola Joffroy
- Succeeded by: Juan Fernández Sánchez Navarro

Personal details
- Born: 21 April 1969 (age 56) Miguel Hidalgo, Mexico City
- Party: National Action Party
- Spouse: Gabriela Velazquez
- Education: National Autonomous University of Mexico (LLB); Cornell University (LLM); London School of Economics (MSc)

Carlos Mendoza Davis (born 21 April 1969) is a Mexican public official who served as the Governor of Baja California Sur from 2015 to 2021. A lawyer by profession, he has earned two master's degrees and has held several positions in the federal government. From May 2007 to October 2010, he served as the regional representative of the Mexican Social Security Institute (IMSS) in Baja California Sur.

== Education ==
Mendoza earned a law degree with honors from the National Autonomous University of Mexico (UNAM) in 1992, for which he wrote the thesis Human rights and their protection in Mexican constitutional law. In 1994 he attended the Institute of International and Comparative Law summer school in France, sponsored by the Cornell Law School and the University of Paris. He entered graduate studies at Cornell Law School in Ithaca, New York, United States and received a Master of Laws (LLM) in 1995 with a research paper entitled The violation of human rights in third world countries as a reason for the imposition of economic sanctions. In 2002, he won a Chevening Scholarship from the British Foreign and Commonwealth Office, provided by the British Council. In 2003, he graduated from the London School of Economics and Political Science with an MSc in Comparative Politics in Latin America, submitting a dissertation entitled The fight against money laundering in Mexico: a critical assessment.

== Professional experience ==
In May 2007, the Technical Board of The Mexican Social Security Institute (IMSS) appointed him regional delegate of the institute in Baja California Sur following a proposal by director general Juan Francisco Molinar Horcasitas. As the head of the IMSS in Baja California Sur, in 2009, he initiated the construction of a new hospital of the Institute in San José del Cabo, in response to demands from residents of the area. Before he was appointed IMSS delegate, he was regional coordinator for the north-west (2003–2005) for the recently established Rural Finance Company (managed by the current Energy Secretary, José Antonio Meade Kuribreña) operating in the states of Baja California, Baja California Sur, Sinaloa and Sonora.

== Political career ==
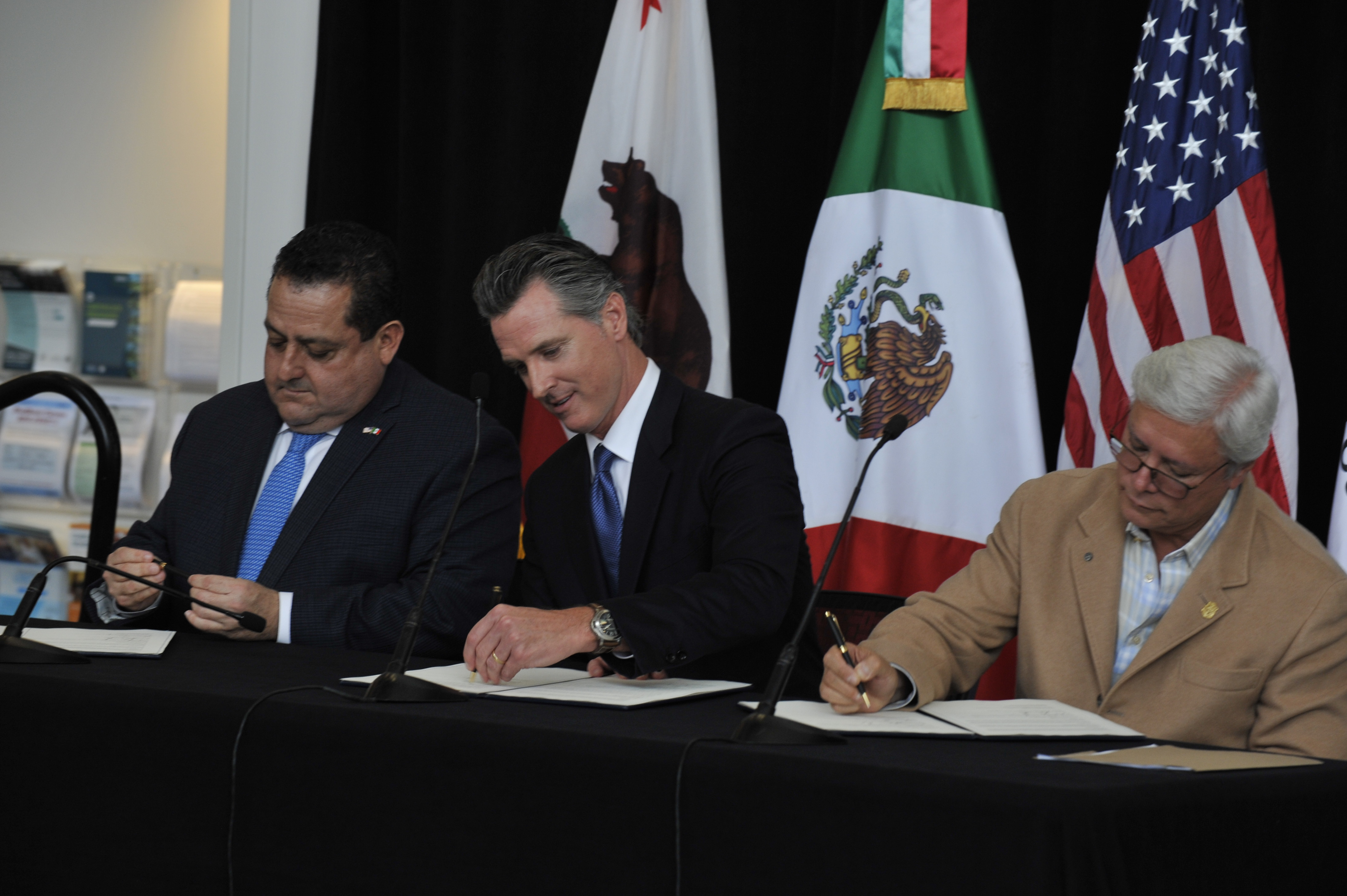
Ceremony for the reestablishment of the Commission of the Californias in 2019. Pictured are Governor Jaime Bonilla Valdez of Baja California (left), Governor Gavin Newsom of California (center), and Governor Carlos Mendoza Davis of Baja California Sur (right).

In 2012, he was elected to the Senate representing his state for the period from 2012 to 2018. However, in 2015 he resigned his seat in order to become a candidate for governor of Baja California Sur. He triumphed in the election, being elected Governor for the period from 2015 to 2021. Mendoza was succeeded by Víctor Manuel Castro Cosío.

== Personal life ==
Mendoza Davis' father, Ángel César Mendoza Arámburo from La Paz, was the first elected governor of Baja California Sur. His mother was Luz Davis Garayzar of Loreto, Baja California Sur. Carlos Mendoza Davis married Gabriela Velazquez in 1999. They have two children, Gabriela (born in 2003) and Carlos (born in 2005).

In October 2020 he announced that both he and his wife had tested positive for COVID-19 amidst the pandemic.

Political offices
Preceded by Marcos Alberto Covarrubias Villaseñor	Governor of Baja California Sur; 2015 – 2021	Succeeded by Víctor Manuel Castro Cosío
