= Cota (power) =

Wireless power technology

"Cota" is the name for a patented technology designed to deliver wireless power, it was developed by Ossia Inc.

The technology sends radio waves at a frequency of 2.4 GHz, which are then received by a receiver device equipped with a Cota chip. The receiver converts the radio waves into usable electrical power, which can then be used to charge batteries or power electronic devices.

One of the key advantages of Cota is that it can transmit power over distances of several meters, even through obstacles such as walls and furniture. This makes it a potentially useful technology for powering devices in homes, offices, and public spaces without wires or cables.

== Features ==
Cota can detect the position of a power receiver within its network and focus a signal to only that position, enabling up to 1 watt of power to be transmitted wirelessly. Since the charging hub can detect, focus, and send the signal to a specific point in the 3-dimensional space, there is no risk of injury compared to other means of wireless power, such as microwave power transmission. Additionally, since Cota uses the same frequency range as Wi-Fi, its range is about 30 feet, an improvement over inductive wireless standards such as Qi which typically have a range of only a few centimeters.

== FCC Approval ==
In June 2019 the Federal Communications Commission granted Ossia equipment authorization for the Cota wireless power system (Cota Transmitter and Receiver), approving its wireless power delivery and data communications under Parts 18 and 15, respectively, of the FCC's rules and certifying the system to be marketed and sold in the U.S.
