= Marcos Covarrubias Villaseñor =

Mexican politician (born 1967)

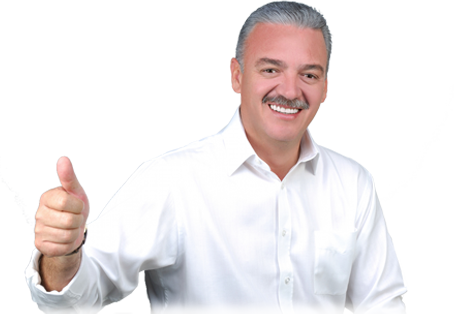
- Villaseñor in 2011

Governor of Baja California Sur
- In office April 5, 2011 – September 10, 2015
- Preceded by: Narciso Agúndez Montaño
- Succeeded by: Carlos Mendoza Davis

Personal details
- Born: July 2, 1967 (age 58) Guadalajara, Jalisco, Mexico
- Party: National Action Party
- Spouse: María Elena Hernández

Marcos Alberto Covarrubias Villaseñor (born July 2, 1967) is a Mexican politician. He has been the governor of the Mexican state of Baja California Sur since April 5, 2012.

Covarrubias Villaseñor was a deputy in the Chamber of Deputies of Mexico before being elected governor in 2011. He was elected to the chamber through the support of the Party of the Democratic Revolution (PRD).

Covarrubias Villaseñor ran for governor of Baja California Sur in the 2011 gubernatorial election, which was held on February 6, 2011. He was nominated by the National Action Party (PAN). The PRD had held the state's governorship since 1999 at the time. He won the election with more than 40% of the vote. The Institutional Revolutionary Party (PRI) candidate, Ricardo Barroso Agramont, was second with 33.52% and the PRD's incumbent candidate, Luis Armando Díaz, was third with approximately 20% of the vote.

Covarrubias Villaseñor was sworn into office on April 5, 2011.

Political offices
Preceded by Narciso Agúndez Montaño	Governor of Baja California Sur; 2011–2015	Succeeded by Carlos Mendoza Davis
