= Alejandro Martínez (Mexican footballer) =

Mexican footballer (born 1990)

Alejandro Martínez Rodríguez (born 10 April 1990) is a Mexican professional footballer who plays as a midfielder.

== Career ==
Martínez was born in Torreón. He came through the Santos Laguna academy, making his debut for the club in 2012, and played for several clubs in Ascenso MX. He joined Zacatepec in 2013. He later played for Atlético Celaya before being without a professional club for a year.

In January 2018 Martínez joined Bosnian club NK Travnik, playing in the second-tier First League of the Federation of Bosnia and Herzegovina, signing a six-month contract.
