= Coromuel =

Weather phenomenon

The Coromuel wind is a weather phenomenon unique to the La Paz area of the Baja California peninsula and adjoining Gulf of California (Sea of Cortéz). Occurring primarily in the late spring and summer, it is a south to south-west wind that typically starts late in the afternoon or early evening and blows throughout the night into the mid-morning. It has a rapid onset and can be very strong especially in the Bay of La Paz.

The basic mechanism of the Coromuel winds is fairly clear. The winds are created when the cool marine air from the Pacific side of the peninsula is drawn over the desert to the relatively warmer side of the Gulf of California. It only occurs in the La Paz area because this is the only place on the peninsula that does not have a spine of mountains blocking such an air flow.

The winds receive their name after Samuel Cromwell, a sailor from the 19th century, believed to be a pirate. He visited La Paz often and, according to legend, hid one of his biggest treasures on the beach that carries his name. Since natives could not pronounce his surname, they called him "Coromuel."
