= Playa Balandra =

Beach in Mexico

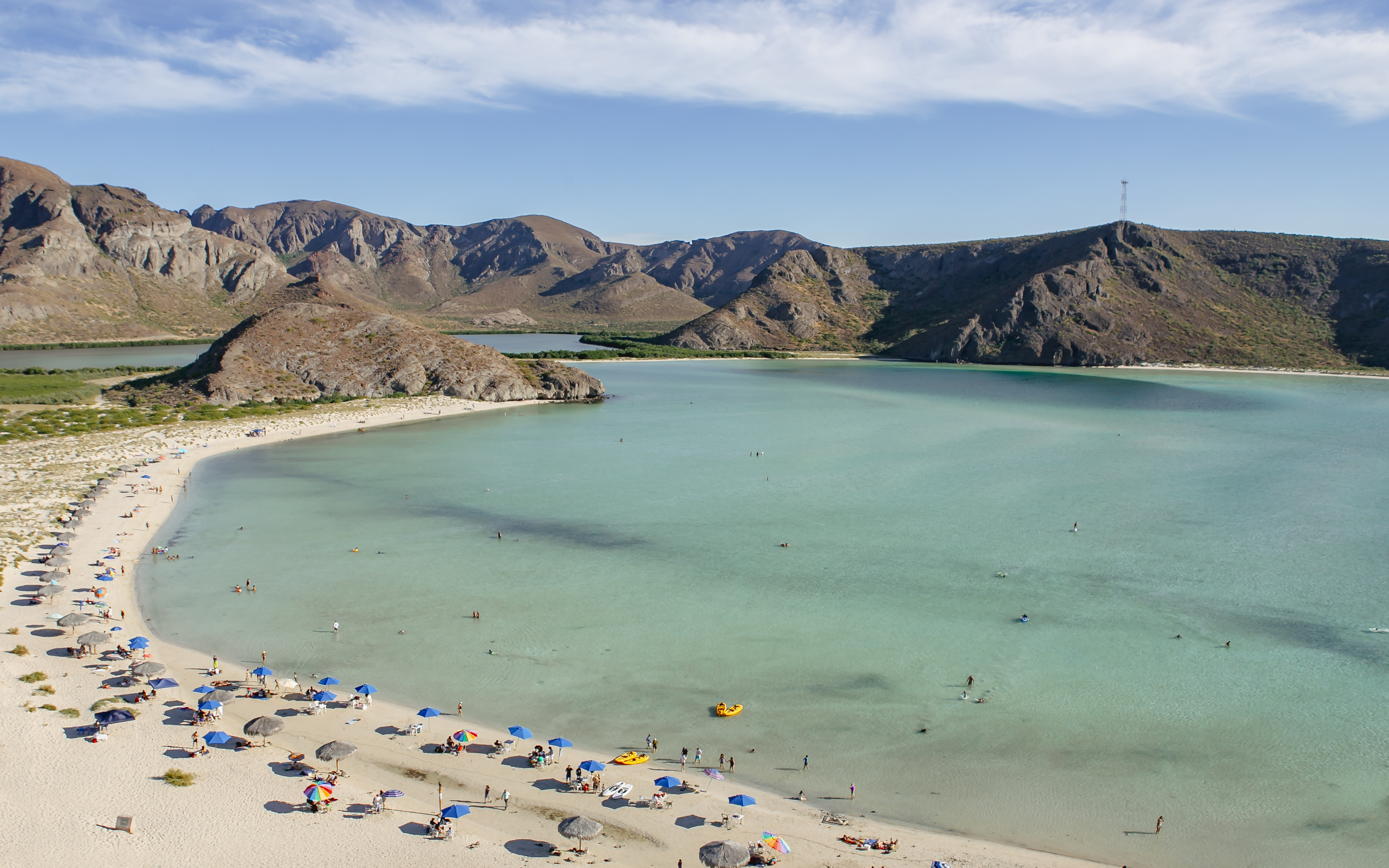
Playa Balandra in La Paz, Mexico

Playa Balandra is a beach located on the Baja California Sur peninsula of Mexico in La Paz. It is located on the Eastern side of the peninsula, but faces west, as the southern tip comes up. This beach is located on Balandra Bay. The water is very shallow, allowing visitors to walk across the bay to the other side. There are also many sandbanks located on this bay.

In May 2020, due to the COVID-19 Pandemic, the beach allowed for only 120 visitors per day. The capacity limit has since been raised to 450 visitors per day. It is recommended by local guides in La Paz to drive up at 6am (earlier on the weekends) to have a chance to enter Playa Balandra. Another option is to take a local boat tour that takes visitors to the other beaches along Balandra Bay.

Balandra actually consists of a collection of multiple beaches. Balandra has 6 beaches which are present year-round with a 7th beach being revealed during low-tide. The most famous of these beaches being home to a rock formation commonly known amongst locals as "El Hongo" or "The Mushroom".
