= José Carlos Cota Osuna =

Mexican politician

- Born: 16 March 1946 (age 80); La Paz, Baja California Sur, Mexico
- Occupation: Politician
- Political party: PRI

José Carlos Cota Osuna (born 16 March 1946) is a Mexican politician affiliated with the Institutional Revolutionary Party. As of 2014 he served as Senator of the LVIII and LIX Legislatures of the Mexican Congress representing Baja California Sur and as Deputy of the LVII Legislature. He previously served in the Congress of Baja California Sur from 1990 to 1993.
