= Luis Coppola Joffroy =

Mexican politician

- Born: 29 May 1948 (age 77); Baja California Sur, Mexico
- Occupations: Politician and businessman
- Political party: PAN

Luis Alberto Coppola Joffroy (born 29 May 1948) is a Mexican politician affiliated with the PAN. He served as Senator of the LX and LXI Legislatures of the Mexican Congress representing Baja California Sur.
