= Puerto Balandra, Baja California Sur =

Puerto Balandra is an isolated, unpopulated coastal area with eight beaches, an interior salt lagoon and a rock formation called "El Hongo" (the mushroom) which has become the symbol of La Paz (Baja California Sur). The area is about 25 km from La Paz on State Highway 11 on the way to Tecolote and faces the Gulf of California.

The area is surrounded by low reddish mountains that contain the occasional desert tree and huge cardón cactus. The red color of the mountains contrast with the white sands of the beaches facing the Gulf with its turquoise, blue and green waters. These waters are filled with thousands of multicolored small fish, coral and larger fish such as tuna, "barriletes", striped mullet, "sierra", barracuda, dogfish and green sharks. There are also starfish and stingrays here.

Just back from the sea itself is a salt lagoon created by sea waters that occasionally come inland. It is shallow enough to walk across and surrounded by mature mangroves. The water is generally very warm, about 30C average, and because of this and its shallowness, the water evaporates rapidly, making it saltier than the ocean water.

While the area does have restaurants, palapas and places to rent equipment for aquatic sports such as scuba diving, it has not been built up by the community that lives in the La Paz area in order to preserve its natural state.
