= Children's Organ Transplant Association =

US nonprofit organization

The Children's Organ Transplant Association (COTA) is a 501(c)(3) nonprofit organization based in Bloomington, Indiana, that helps children and young adults who need a life-saving organ, bone marrow, cord blood, tissue or stem cell transplant by providing fundraising assistance and family support.

== History ==
COTA was founded in Bloomington, Indiana, in 1986 and has assisted over 2,200 families with over $75 million (U.S.) raised since that time. Approximately 200 families per year receive assistance annually through COTA. COTA is the only organization of its type that charges no fee for its services and which insures that 100% of all funds donated to transplant-related expenses are used exclusively for that purpose.

== Operations and qualification ==
Any individual under the age of 22, as well as those patients who are older but suffer from a single-gene disorder are eligible to receive help from COTA. Once engaged, a fundraising team is organized comprising a Community Coordinator, a Webmaster and a Public Relations Coordinator who then recruit other volunteers. COTA provides on-site training as well as unlimited marketing assistance to the fundraising team. Funds raised are donations to COTA, but donated "in honor of" particular patients and funds raised are held in trust for patients until such time as they are needed for transplant-related expenses.
