= Isaías González Cuevas =

Mexican politician

Isaías Gonález Cuevas
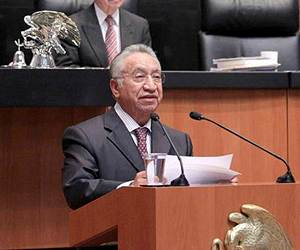

Member of the Senate for Baja California Sur
- In office 1 September 2012 – 14 January 2015
- Preceded by: Josefina Cota Cota
- Succeeded by: Ana Luisa Yuen Santa Ana

Personal details
- Born: 6 July 1940 (age 85) Acolman, Mexico State, Mexico
- Party: PRI
- Occupation: Senator

Isaías González Cuevas (born 6 July 1940) is a Mexican politician affiliated with the PRI. He currently serves as Senator of the LXII Legislature of the Mexican Congress for Baja California Sur. He also served as member of the Chamber of Deputies during the LVII and LXI legislatures.
