= Autonomous University of Baja California Sur =

- Universidad Autónoma de Baja California Sur
- Motto: Spanish: Sabiduría como meta, patria como destino
- Motto in English: Wisdom as goal, fatherland as destiny
- Type: Public university
- Established: 15 March 1976
- Location: La Paz, Baja California Sur, Mexico; 24.100874°N 110.315121°W
- Campus: Urban
- Website: uabcs.mx

The Autonomous University of Baja California Sur (in Spanish: Universidad Autónoma de Baja California Sur, UABCS) is a Mexican public university based in the state of Baja California Sur.

Its library holds over 42,000 volumes.

The university was created by Ángel César Mendoza Arámburo, the Governor of Baja California Sur, whose bill was published into law on 31 December 1975. Tomas Balarezo Cota was named the first rector by the university council on 2 February 1976. He was replaced by Rubén Cardoza Macías in 1978.

UABCS opened an extension campus in Guerrero Negro in 1995 under Jesús Druk González's term as rector, offering degrees in economics and agricultural engineering in its first year.

== Extension campuses ==
- Cabo San Lucas
- Ciudad Insurgentes
- Loreto
- Guerrero Negro
