= La Paz Municipality, Baja California Sur =

Municipality in the Mexican state of Baja California Sur

Coordinates: 24°00′N 110°45′W

La Paz
- Municipality
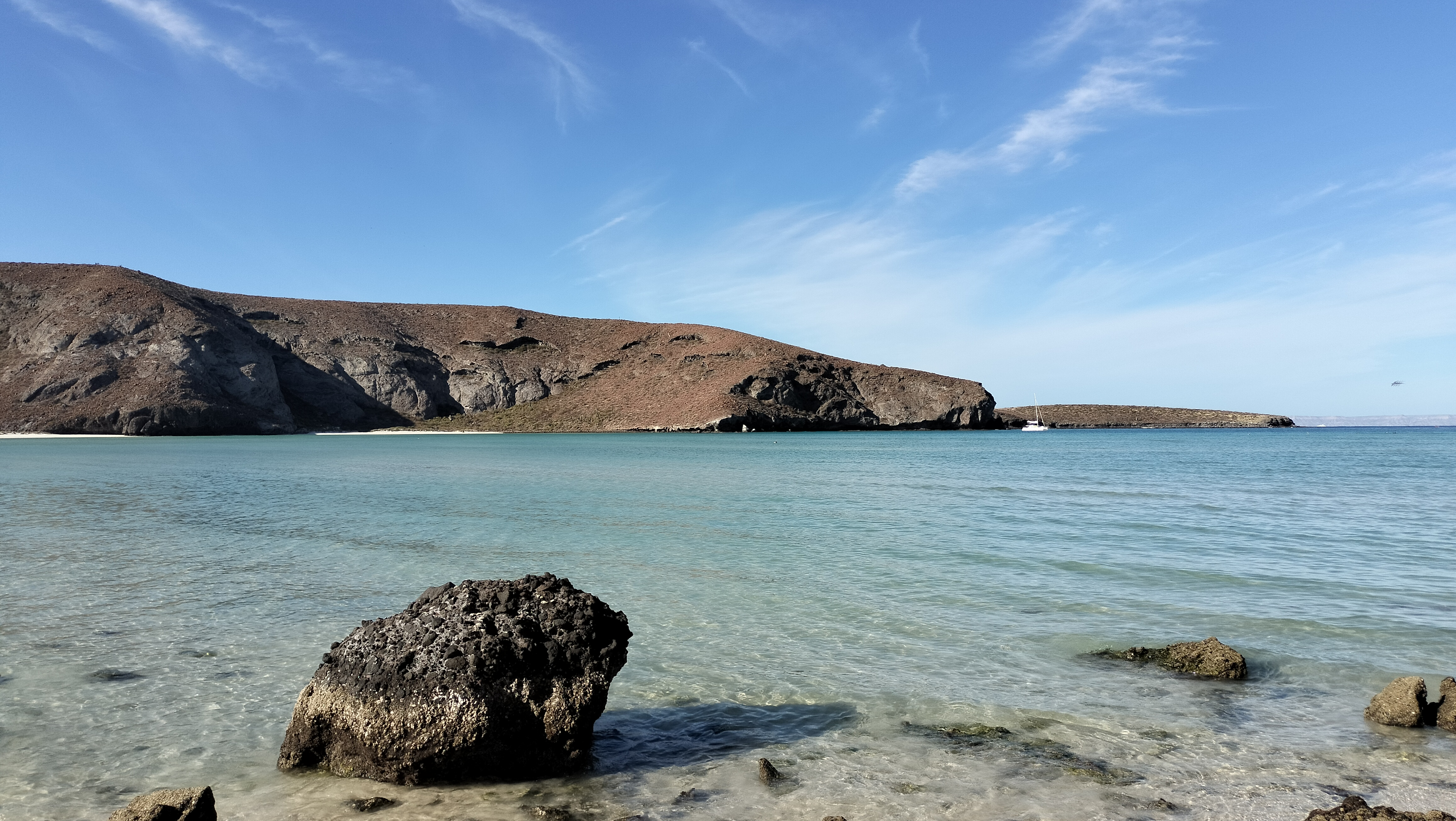
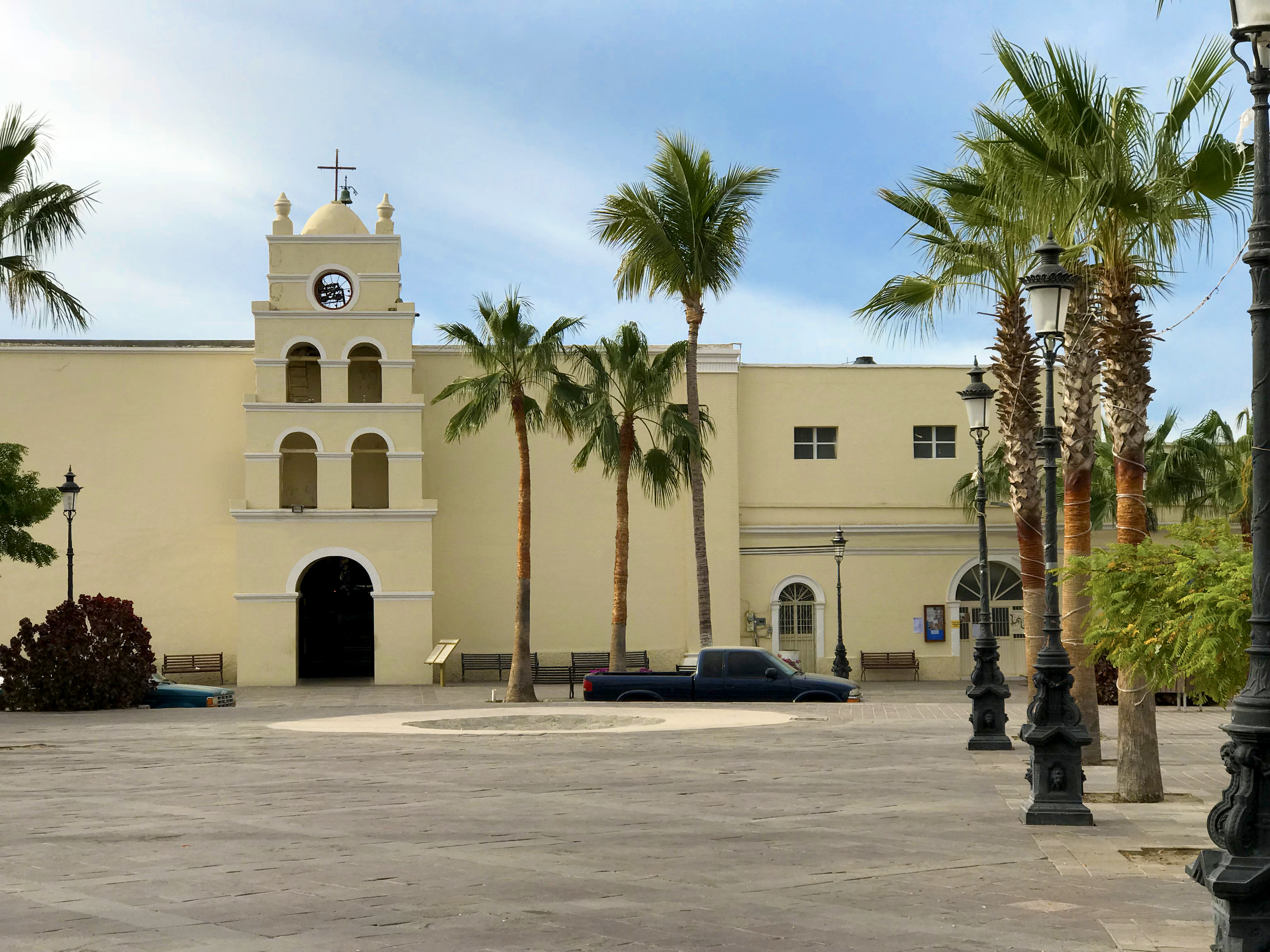
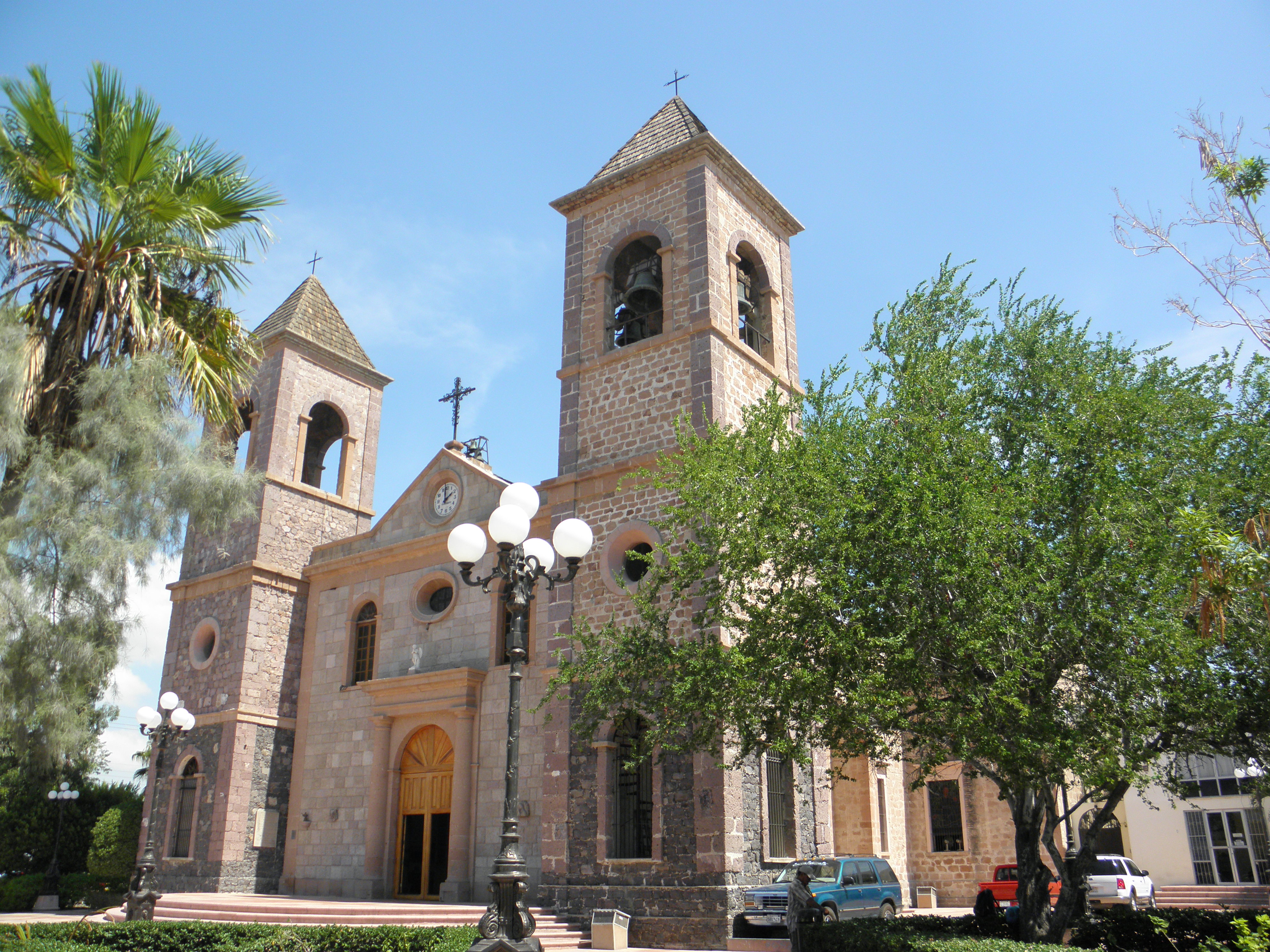
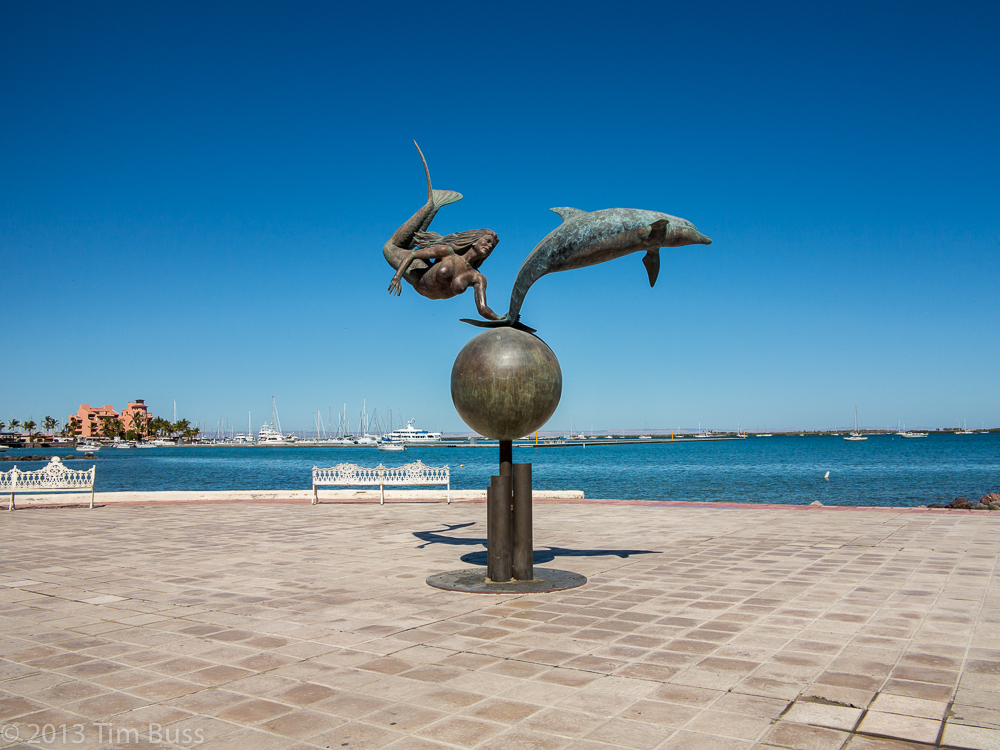
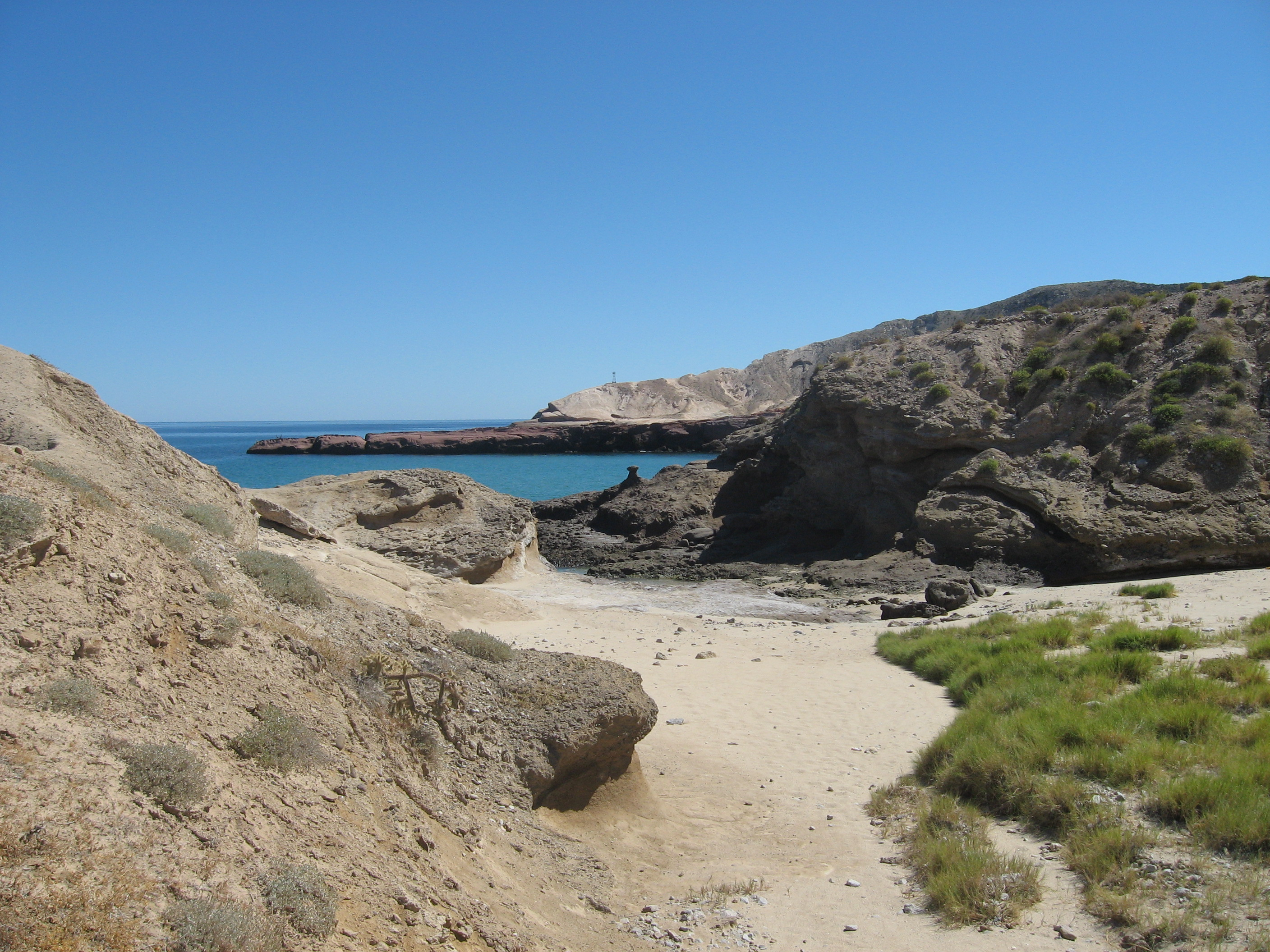
- Top: Balandra Beach; Middle: Todos Santos, Our Lady of Peace Cathedral: La Paz Promenade, San José Island

- Coat of arms

- Location of municipality in Baja California Sur
- Country: Mexico
- State: Baja California Sur
- Municipal seat and largest city: La Paz

Government
  - Mayor: Milena Paola Quiroga Romero (MORENA)

Area
  - Total: 33,092.20 km^{2} (12,776.97 sq mi)

Population (2020)
  - Total: 292,241
  - Density: 8.83111/km^{2} (22.8725/sq mi)
  - Seat: 250,141
- Time zone: UTC−07:00 (Zona Pacífico)
- Area code: +52 612
- Website: (in Spanish) Ayuntamiento de La Paz

La Paz is a municipality in the Mexican state of Baja California Sur. Its area of 20,275 km^{2} (7,828 sq mi) makes it the municipality in Mexico with the fourth-largest area. It had a population of 290,286 inhabitants in the 2015 census. Its municipal seat, also named La Paz, is the state capital.

== Demographics ==
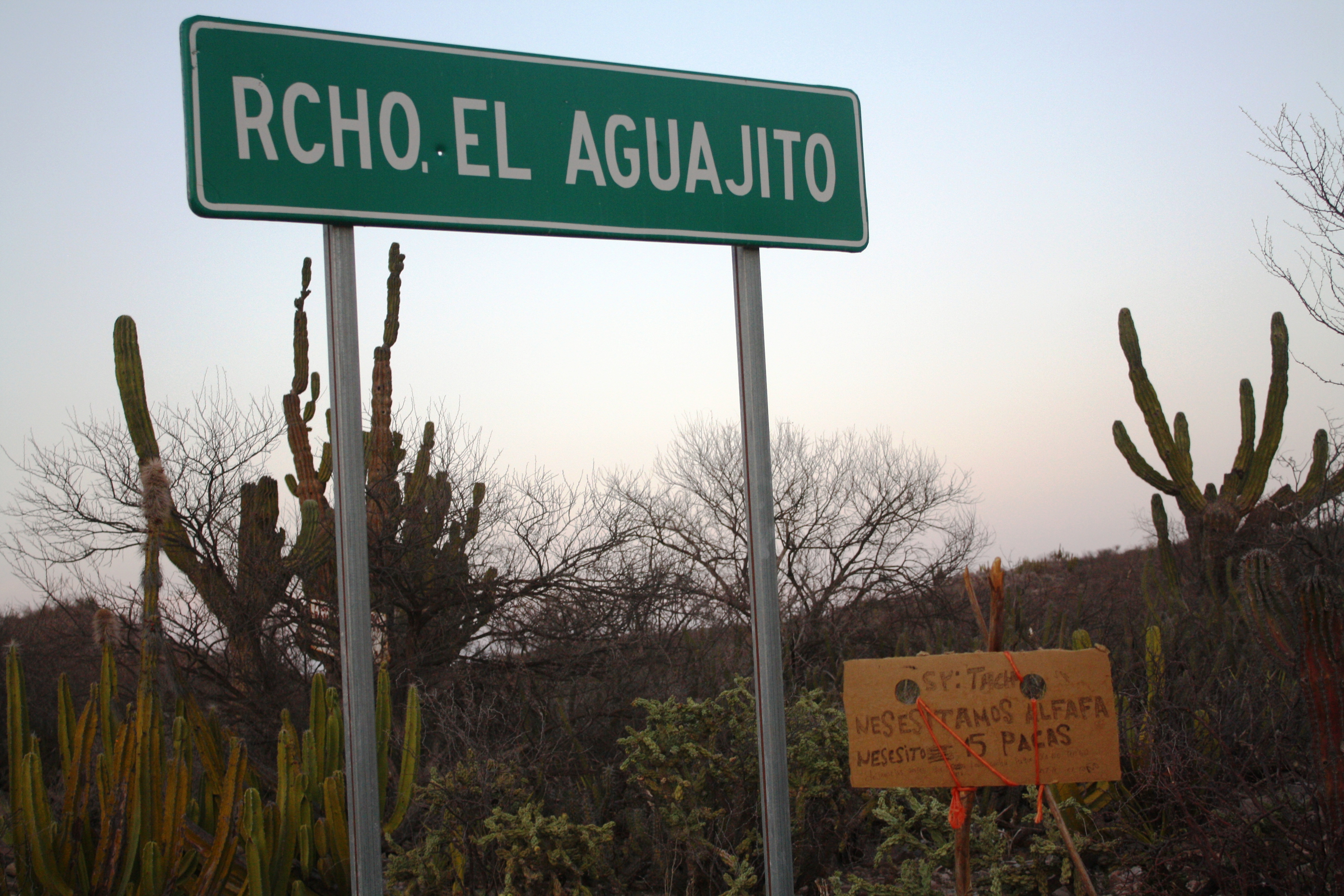
Ranches

Historical population
Year	Pop.	±%
1970	51,521	—
1980	130,427	+153.2%
1990	160,970	+23.4%
1995	182,418	+13.3%
2000	196,907	+7.9%
2005	219,596	+11.5%
2010	251,871	+14.7%
2015	272,711	+8.3%
2020	292,241	+7.2%

As of 2020, the municipality had a total population of 292,241. The city of La Paz had a population of 250,241. Other than the city of La Paz, the municipality had 1,018 localities, the largest of which (with 2020 populations in brackets) were: Todos Santos (7,185 hab.), El Centenario (6,221 hab.), classified as urban, and El Pescadero (4,245 hab.), Chametla (3,045 hab.), Melitón Albáñez Domínguez (2,409 hab.) and Los Barriles (1,674 hab.), classified as rural.

== Government ==
=== Municipal presidents ===
Municipal president	Term	Political party	Notes
Alfonso González Ojeda	1972–1974	PRI	
Jorge Santa Ana González	1975–1977	PRI	
Francisco Cardoza Macías	1978–1980	PRI	
Matías Amador Moyrón	1981–1983	PRI	
J. Enrique V. Ortega Romero	1984–1986	PRI	
José Carlos Cota Osuna	1987–1989	PRI	
Antonio Wilson González	1990–1993	PRI	
Adán Rufo Velarde	1993–1996	PAN	
Leonel Cota Montaño	1996–1998	PRI	
Ramón Donato Ojeda Carrillo	1998–1999	PRI	Acting municipal president
Alfredo Porras Domínguez	1999–2002	PRD; PT	Democratic and Labor Coalition
Víctor Manuel Guluarte Castro	2002–2005	PRD; Convergencia	
Víctor Manuel Castro Cosío	2005–2008	PRD; Convergencia	Sudcalifornian Democratic Coalition (Coalición Democrática Sudcaliforniana)
Rosa Delia Cota Montaño	2008–2011	PRD; Convergencia; PT	Coalition for the Good of Sudcalifornia
Esthela Ponce Beltrán	2011–2014	PRI; PVEM	Coalition "United for BCS"
Francisco Javier Monroy Sánchez	2014–2015	PRI; PVEM	Coalition "United for BCS". Acting municipal president
Armando Martínez Vega	2015–2018	PAN; Partido de Renovación Sudcaliforniana	
Rubén Gregorio Muñoz Álvarez	2018–2021	Morena; PES	
Milena Paola Quiroga Romero	2021–2024	Morena	
Milena Paola Quiroga Romero	2024–	Morena	She was reelected

== See also ==
- Puerto Balandra, Baja California Sur
