= Narciso Agúndez Montaño =

Mexican politician

Narciso Agúndez
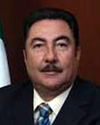

Governor of Baja California Sur
- In office 5 April 2005 – 5 April 2011
- Preceded by: Leonel Cota
- Succeeded by: Marcos Covarrubias Villaseñor

Municipal president of Los Cabos
- In office 1999–2002
- Preceded by: Miguel Ángel Olacea Palacios
- Succeeded by: Ulises Omar Ceseña Montaño

Personal details
- Born: October 26, 1958 (age 67) Santa Anita, Baja California Sur
- Party: Party of the Democratic Revolution
- Spouse: Sonia Gómez
- Education: UABCS
- Profession: Agricultural Engineer

Narciso Agúndez Montaño (born 26 October 1958) is a Mexican former politician who served as governor of Baja California Sur from 2005 to 2011. Elected on February 6, 2005, he took office on April 5, 2005, and is the second member of Party of the Democratic Revolution to hold the office of governor in Baja California Sur, after his predecessor and cousin Leonel Cota Montaño.

A graduate of the Autonomous University of Baja California Sur, he began his political career in 1984 as Director of the Promotion of Agriculture in Los Cabos, and in 1986 became the Director of Municipal Services there. He was detained by the Mexican authorities on 24 May 2012 for embezzlement, and is currently under custody.

Preceded by Leonel Cota Montaño	Governor of Baja California Sur; 2005 - 2011	Succeeded by Marcos Alberto Covarrubias Villaseñor
