= Leonel Cota Montaño =

Mexican politician (born 1958)

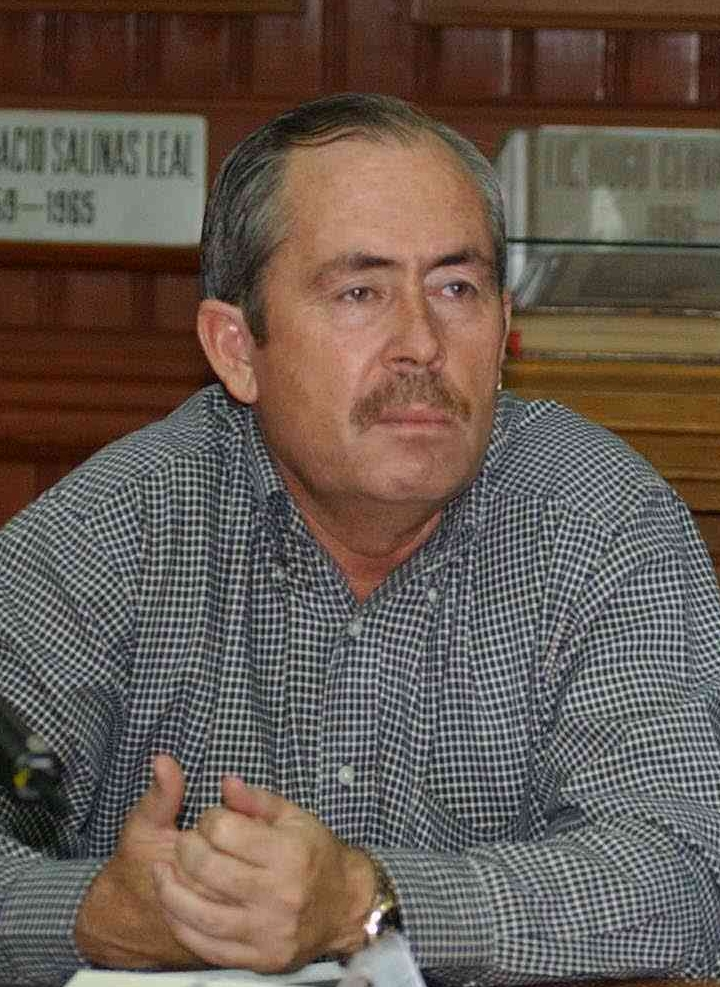
Cota Montaño in 2003

Leonel Efraín Cota Montaño (Note: In this Mexican name, the surname is Cota and the second or maternal family name is Montaño.) (born 23 April 1958) is a Mexican politician. He was the governor of Baja California Sur in 1999–2005 and the president of the Party of the Democratic Revolution (PRD) in 2005–2008. He was the first non-PRI governor of Baja California Sur.

== Political career ==
Born in Santiago, Baja California Sur, in 1958, Leonel Cota studied political science at the National Autonomous University of Mexico (UNAM). He began his political career as a member of the Institutional Revolutionary Party (PRI), for which he represented Baja California Sur's 1st district in the Chamber of Deputies from 1994 to 1996 and served as municipal president of La Paz, Baja California Sur, from 1997 to 1999.

In 1999 he lost the PRI candidacy for governor of Baja California Sur. He quit the PRI and instead ran for governor representing a coalition of the Party of the Democratic Revolution and the Labor Party (PT). He won the election and served as governor from 1999 to 2005.

In 2005 Cota became president of the PRD with over 76% of the vote.

He later shifted allegiance to Nueva Alianza in a failed bid for the municipal presidency of Los Cabos, Baja California Sur. He then reverted to the PRD, for the 2012 general election, looking for a Senate seat. This makes PAN the only major Mexican political party to which he has not belonged.

== Notes ==
Political offices
Preceded by Guillermo Mercado Romero	Governor of Baja California Sur; 1999–2005	Succeeded by Narciso Agúndez
Party political offices
Preceded by Leonel Godoy	President of the Party of the Democratic Revolution; 2005–2008	Succeeded by vacant
