= Governor of Baja California Sur =

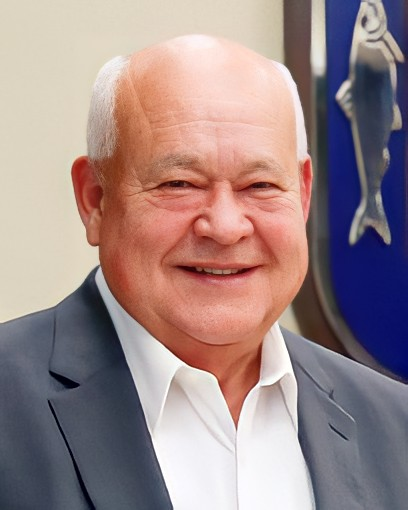
- Incumbent; Víctor Manuel Castro Cosío since 10 September 2021
- Term length: Six years, non-renewable.
- Inaugural holder: Félix Agramont Cota
- Formation: 8 October 1974

The governor is the chief executive of the Mexican state of Baja California Sur. The present governor is Víctor Manuel Castro Cosío of National Regeneration Movement (Morena), who took office on 10 September 2021.

== Governors of Baja California Sur ==
Baja California Sur was admitted as a state on 8 October 1974. Félix Agramont Cota, the last governor of the outgoing territory, served as the first governor of Baja California Sur from the state's creation in October 1974 until April 1975. Angel César Mendoza Arámburo took office on 6 April 1975, as Baja California Sur's first elected governor.

No.	Portrait	Governor	Took office	Left office	Party	Election
–	Félix Agramont Cota	Félix Agramont Cota (1918–2013); Acting	8 October 1974	4 April 1975	PRI	–
1	Ángel César Mendoza Arámburo	Ángel César Mendoza Arámburo (1934–2014)	5 April 1975	4 April 1981	PRI	1975
2	Alberto Alvarado Arámburo	Alberto Alvarado Arámburo (1925–1996)	5 April 1981	4 April 1987	PRI	1980
3	Víctor Manuel Liceaga Ruibal	Víctor Manuel Liceaga Ruibal (1935–2012)	5 April 1987	4 April 1993	PRI	1987
4	Guillermo Mercado Romero	Guillermo Mercado Romero (born 1944)	5 April 1993	4 April 1999	PRI	1993
5	Leonel Cota Montaño	Leonel Cota Montaño (born 1956)	5 April 1999	4 April 2005	PRD	1999
6	Narciso Agúndez Montaño	Narciso Agúndez Montaño (born 1958)	5 April 2005	4 April 2011	PRD	2005
7	Marcos Covarrubias Villaseñor	Marcos Covarrubias Villaseñor (born 1967)	5 April 2011	9 September 2015	PAN	2011
8	Carlos Mendoza Davis	Carlos Mendoza Davis (born 1969)	10 September 2015	9 September 2021	PAN	2015
9	Víctor Manuel Castro Cosío	Víctor Manuel Castro Cosío (born 1955)	10 September 2021	Incumbent	MORENA	2021

== Governors of the Southern Territory of Baja California ==
The Southern Territory of Baja California was the predecessor federal territory of the current state.

Image	Name	Party	Term
	Félix Agramont Cota	PRI	1970 – 8 October 1974
	Hugo Cervantes del Río	PRI	1966–1970
	Bonifacio Salinas Leal	PRI	1959–1966
	Lucino M. Rebolledo	PRI	1957–1958
	Patrocinio Flores Castellanos	PRI	1956–1957
	Agustín Olachea Avilés	PRI	1946–1956
	Francisco José Múgica	PRI	1941–1945
	Rafael M. Pedrajo	PRI	1938–1940
	Juan Domínguez Cota	PRI	1932–1938
	Ruperto Garcia de Alba	PRI	1931–1932
	Agustín Olachea Avilés	PRI	1929–1931
	Agustín Arriola Martínez	–	1924–1928
