= Congress of Baja California Sur =

Legislature of Baja California Sur, Mexico

Congress of the State of Baja California Sur
- XVI Legislature

Type
- Type: Unicameral

Leadership
- President: Eduardo Valentín Van Wormer Castro (MORENA)
- Secretary: Gabriela Montoya Terrazas (PT)

Structure
- Seats: 21
- Political groups: MORENA (12) PT (4) PNA (2) PVEM (1) PRI (1) PAN (1)
- Authority: Title VI, Chapter I, Article 40 of the Political Constitution of the Free and Sovereign State of Baja California Sur

Elections
- Voting system: First-past-the-post for 16 electoral district seats and Mixed-member proportional representation for 5 proportional representation seats
- Last election: 2 June 2024
- Next election: 2027

Meeting place
- La Paz, Baja California Sur, Mexico

Website
- www.cbcs.gob.mx

The Congress of the State of Baja California Sur (Spanish: Congreso del Estado de Baja California Sur) is the legislative branch of the government of the State of Baja California Sur. The Congress is the governmental deliberative body of Baja California Sur, which is equal to, and independent of, the executive.

The Congress is unicameral and consists of 21 deputies. 16 deputies are elected on a first-past-the-post basis while five are elected through a system of proportional representation. Deputies are elected to serve for a three-year term.

The Congress convenes at the “General José María Morelos y Pavón” meeting room at the Palace of Legislative Power in the state capital of La Paz.

== Structure ==
In order to carry out its duties, the Congress is organized in the following manner:

- Management bodies (Órganos de Dirección):
  - Board of Directors (Mesa Directiva)
  - Political Coordination Board (Junta de Gobierno y Coordinación Política)
- Working bodies (Órganos de Trabajo):
  - Permanent Committees (Comisiones Permanentes) (Note: There are 32 permanent committees as of 2021.)
  - Special Committees (Comisiones Especiales)
- Technical and Administrative bodies (Órganos Técnicos y Administrativos):
  - Administrative Department (Oficialía Mayor)
  - Finance Department (Dirección de Finanzas)
  - Legal Department (Asesoría Jurídica)
  - Social Communication Department (Dirección de Comunicación Social)

== Historical composition ==
This chart shows the historical composition of the Congress of Baja California Sur from the I Legislature to the present. It reflects the party affiliations of deputies at the time of their election and does not account for subsequent party switching.

Congress of Baja California Sur, 1975 to present

PAN / PRI / PPS / PSUM / PRD / PT / PVEM / PRS / PAS / MC / PANAL / MORENA / PH / PES / FXM			Total
I	1975	1 / 7	8
II	1977	1 / 7	8
III	1980	1 / 8 / 1	10
IV	1983	1 / 10 / 2	13
V	1987	1 / 12 / 2	15
VI	1990	15 / 3	18
VII	1993 (Note: Initially, this legislature was to include three proportional representation seats, which would be assigned to parties that obtained more than 2% of the vote in the elections and did not reach a majority of five seats. However, the only two parties that exceeded the minimum percentage of votes — the Institutional Revolutionary Party and the National Action Party — exceeded the maximum number of seats, so neither could claim the seats, leaving the three proportional representation seats in this legislature vacant.)	7 / 8 / 3	18
VIII	1996	2 / 1 / 11 / 6	20
IX	1999	12 / 5 / 4	21
X	2002	3 / 8 / 6 / 1 / 2 / 1	21
XI	2005	2 / 16 / 2 / 1	21
XII	2008	14 / 1 / 2 / 2 / 2	21
XIII	2011	4 / 2 / 1 / 1 / 6 / 7	21
XIV	2015	1 / 1 / 1 / 8 / 3 / 7	21
XV	2018	1 / 10 / 1 / 1 / 1 / 1 / 6	21
XVI	2021	4 / 9 / 1 / 2 / 1 / 1 / 2 / 1	21
XVII	2024	4 / 12 / 2 / 1 / 1 / 1	21

== See also ==
- List of Mexican state congresses
