= Colonia del Sol, Baja California Sur =

Coordinates: 22°54′45″N 109°55′15″W

Colonia del Sol
- City
- Colony of the Sun
- Interactive map of Colonia del Sol
- Country: Mexico
- State: Baja California Sur
- Municipality: Los Cabos

Area
  - Total: 26.89 km^{2} (10.38 sq mi)
- Elevation: 62 m (203 ft)

Population (2015)
  - Total: 64,055
  - Density: 2,382/km^{2} (6,170/sq mi)

Colonia del Sol (when translated to English is "Colony of the Sun") is a northern suburb of Cabo San Lucas, in Baja California Sur, Mexico. It is the third-largest locality in Los Cabos Municipality. It had a 2015 census population of 64,055 inhabitants and lies at an elevation of 62 m (203 ft.).
