= Mission San José =

Mission San José may refer to:

- Mission San José (California), a Spanish mission in Fremont, California
- Mission San Jose, Fremont, California, a neighborhood
- Mission San Jose High School, a high school in Fremont, California
- Mission San José (Texas), a Spanish mission in San Antonio, Texas
- Misión San José de Comondú, Baja California Sur
