= Comondú Municipality =

Municipality in the Mexican state of Baja California Sur

Coordinates: 25°30′N 112°00′W

Comondú
- Municipality
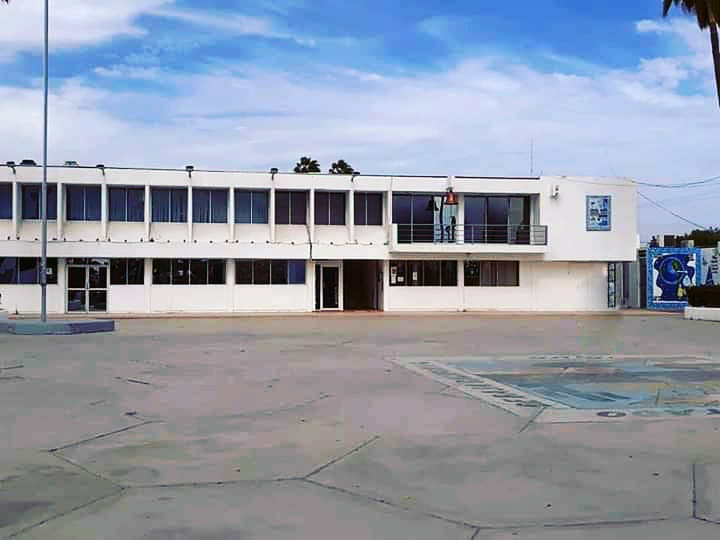
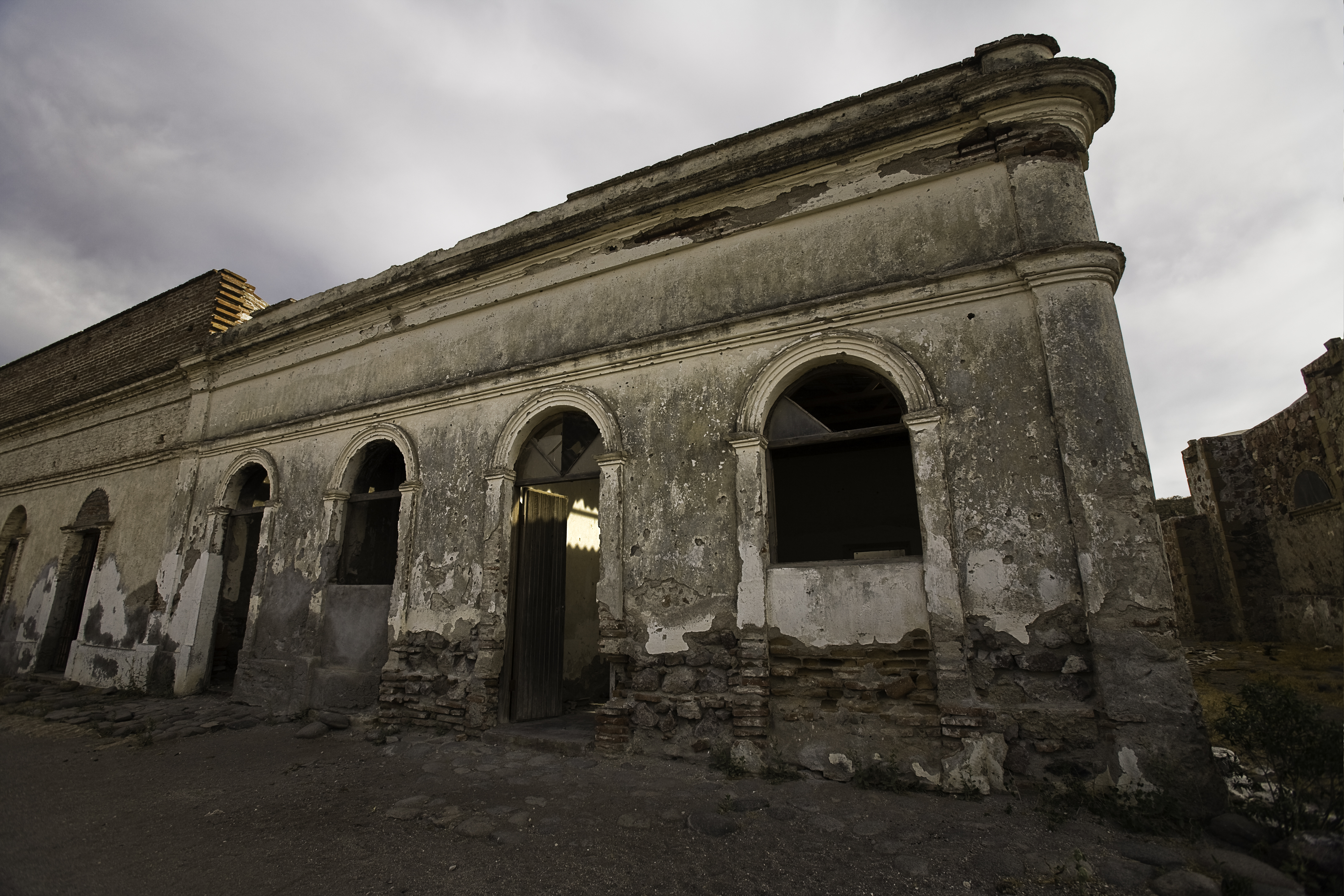
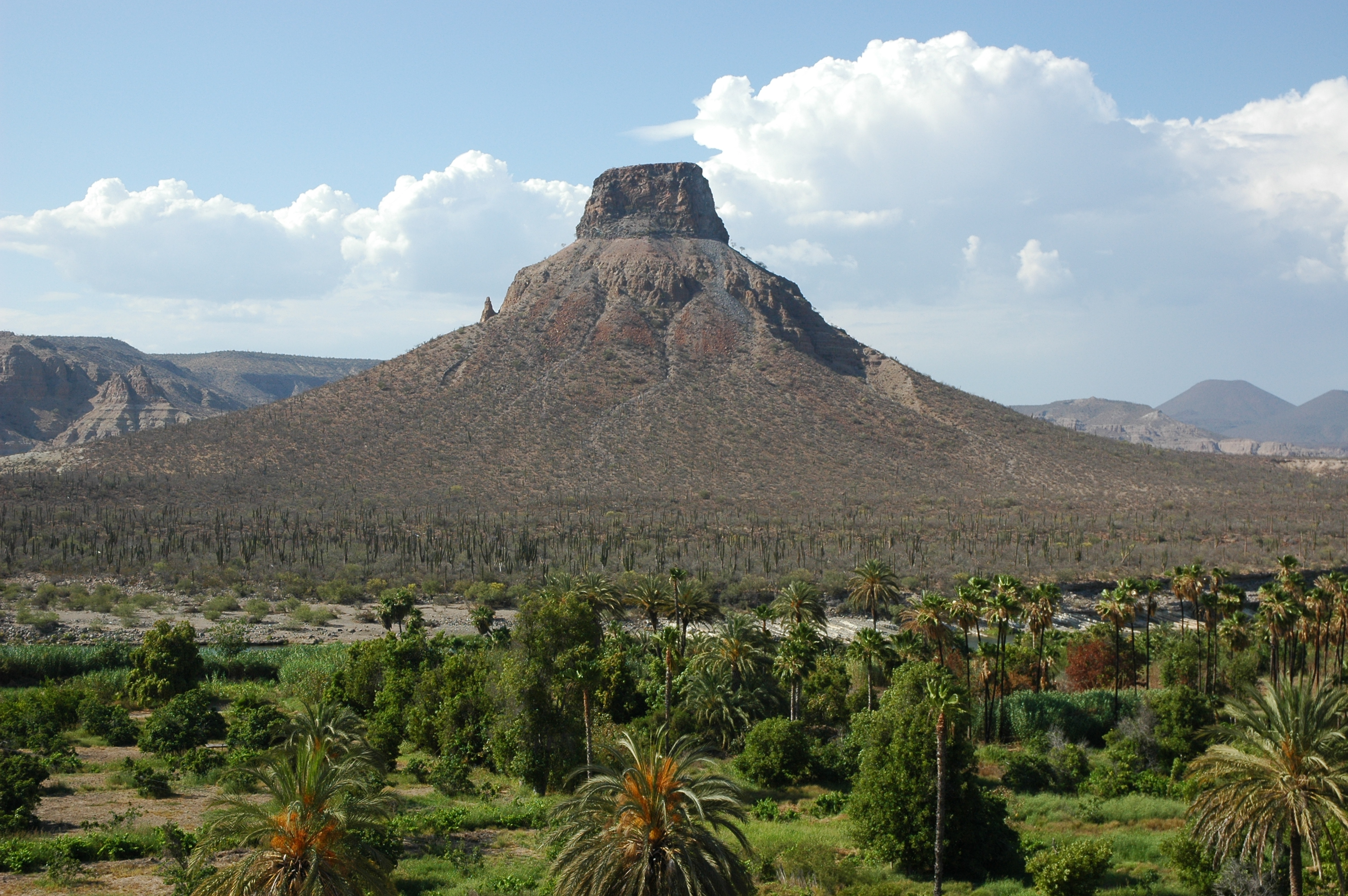
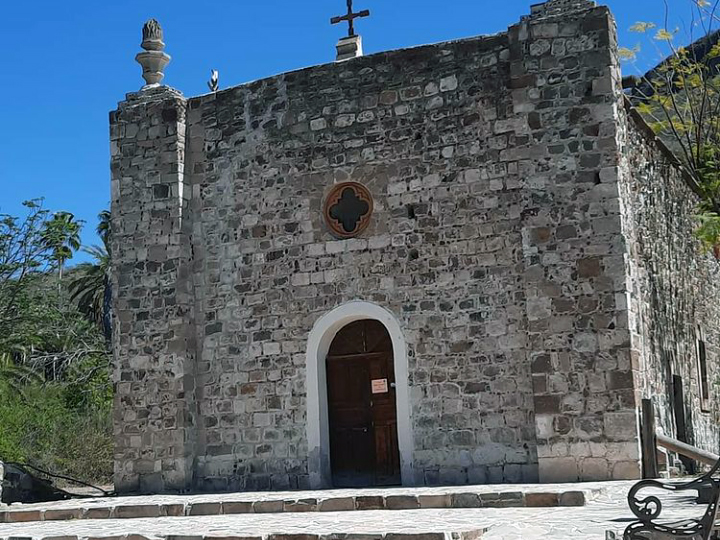
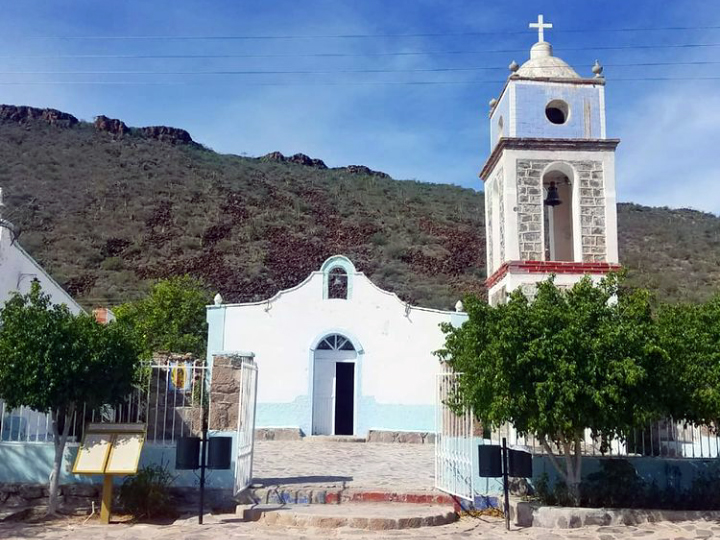
- Top: Comondú Municipal Hall at Ciudad Constitución; Middle: Mission San Luis Gonzaga Chiriyaqui, La Purísima Oasis; Bottom: Mission San José de Comondú, San Miguel de Comondú Town

- Coat of arms

- Location of Comondú in Baja California Sur.
- Country: Mexico
- State: Baja California Sur
- Municipal seat and largest city: Ciudad Constitución

Government
  - Mayor: Ing. Roberto Pantoja Castro (MORENA)

Area
  - Total: 18,318.6 km^{2} (7,072.9 sq mi)

Population (2020)
  - Total: 73,021
  - Density: 3.9862/km^{2} (10.324/sq mi)
  - Seat: 43,805
- Time zone: UTC−07:00 (Zona Pacífico)
- INEGI code: 001

Comondú is a municipality in the Mexican state of Baja California Sur. It had a population of 73,021 inhabitants in 2020. With a land area of 16,318.6 km^{2} (7,072.9 sq mi), it is the seventh-largest municipality in area in Mexico. The municipal seat is located in Ciudad Constitución.

The Spanish missions of San José de Comondú and San Luis Gonzaga are located in this municipality. The Rocas Alijos, a group of tiny uninhabited rocks that are 300 km west off the coast, are part of the municipality.

The municipality of Comondú takes its name from an indigenous Californian root: caamanc cadeu, of the Cochimí ethnic group, which means: reed bed in a ravine - The center is divided into two unequal parts; the upper part has a rising sun, on the right a cardón type cactus (cardón). Other villages of relevance Cd. Insurgentes, Puerto San Carlos, Puerto Lopez Mateos, Villa Ignacio Zaragoza, San Juanico, San Isidro, La Purisima, Cadeje, Tepentu, Villa Morelos. Once a prosperous agricultural valley, mainly grains, and a lot of other non seasonal products (Asparagus, Oranges, tomatoes, onion, and cotton).

== Politics ==
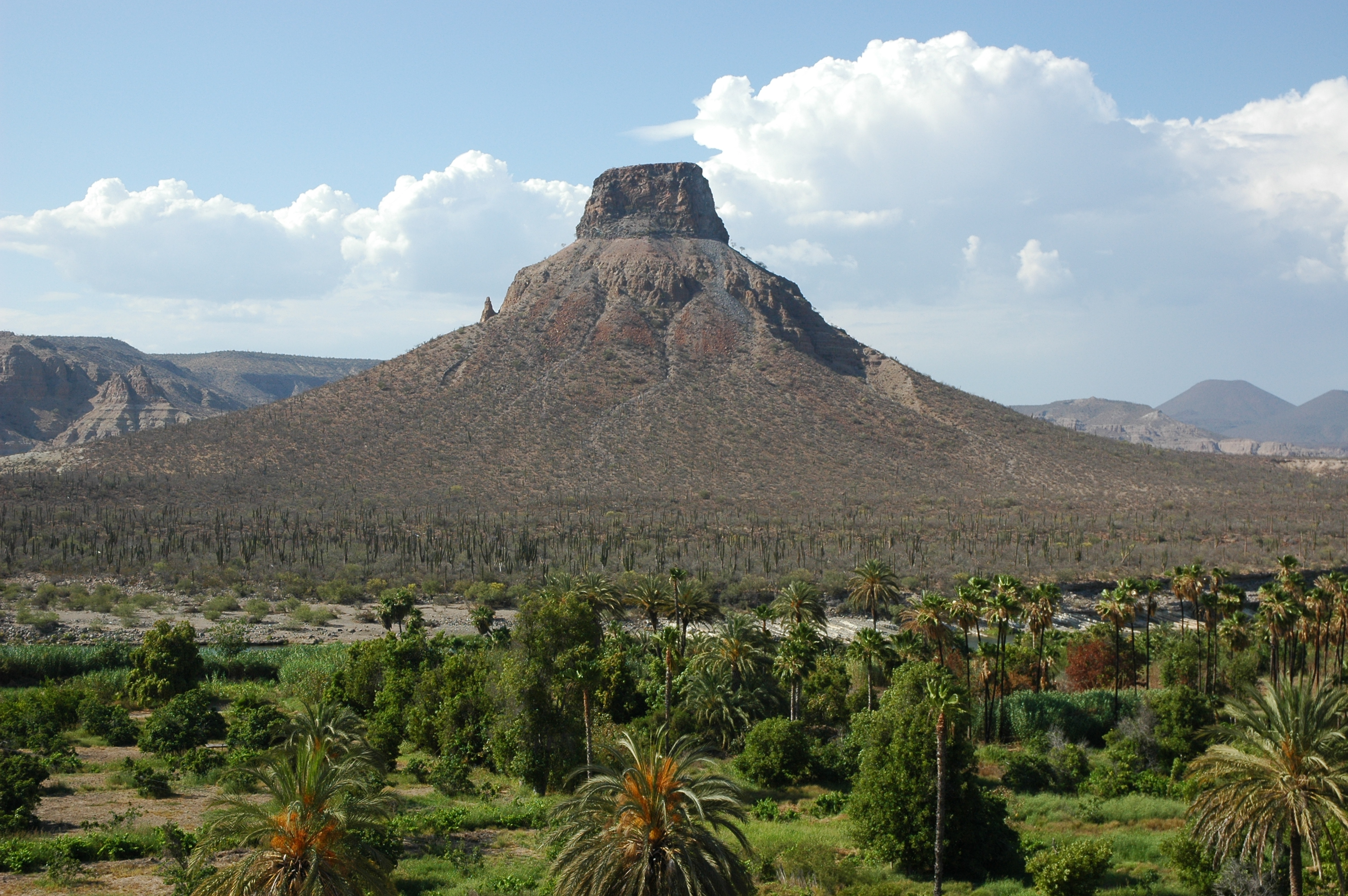
Cerro El Pilón la Purísima.

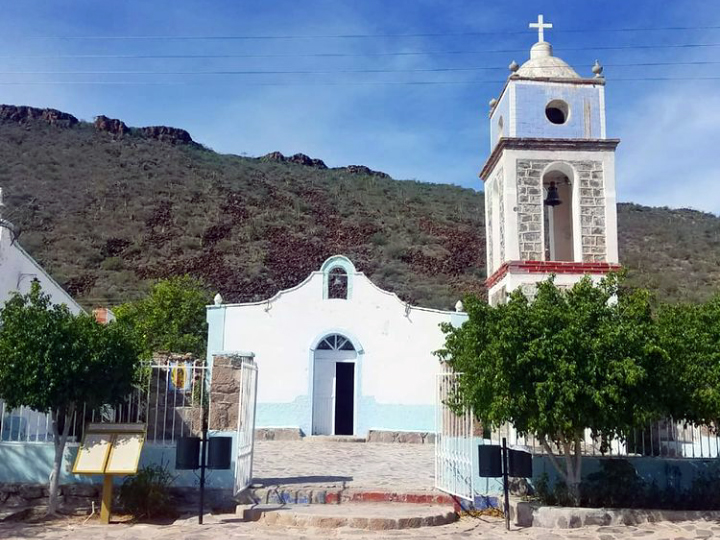
Church in San Miguel de Comondú.

The Municipality of Comondú was one of the first three municipalities created in the then Federal South Territory of Baja California as part of a presidential decree of 1971, after a constitutional amendment allowing the creation and election of local councils in the territory, hitherto divided into political delegations. Dated January 1, 1972 Comondú was formally the first City Council. The township government rests with the council; it consists of the Mayor, a trustee and a council composed of fourteen aldermen; the city council is elected for a period of three years by popular vote (direct and secret), starting every April 30 of the election year.

As of March 1, 2021, the municipality reported 1,740 recoveries, 26 active cases, and 158 deaths from the COVID-19 pandemic in Mexico.

== Demographics ==
Historical population
Year	Pop.	±%
1970	32,260	—
1980	57,729	+78.9%
1990	74,346	+28.8%
1992		—
1995	66,096	—
2000	63,864	−3.4%
2005	63,830	−0.1%
2010	70,816	+10.9%
2015	72,564	+2.5%
2020	73,021	+0.6%
Included territory of Loreto Municipality until 1992.

As of 2020, the municipality had a total population of 73,031.

The municipality had 589 localities, the largest of which (with 2020 populations in parentheses) were: Ciudad Constitución (43,805 hab.), Ciudad Insurgentes (9,133 hab.), Puerto San Carlos (5,742 hab.), classified as urban, and Puerto Adolfo López Mateos (2,227 hab.), Villa Ignacio Zaragoza (1,304 hab.), and Villa Morelos (1,189 hab.), classified as rural.

== Economy ==
Agriculture and livestock are the main sectors at Comondú.

=== Agriculture and livestock ===
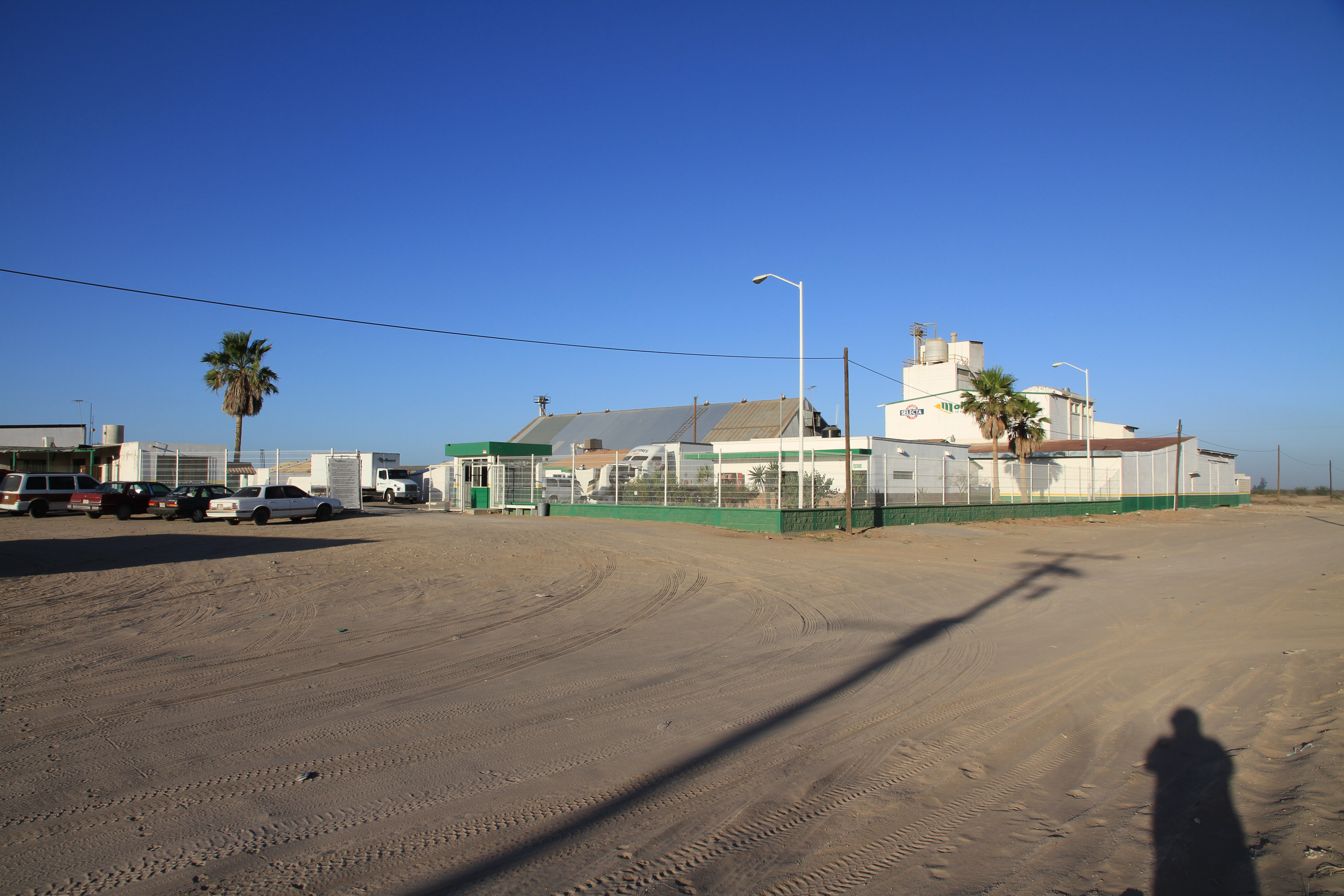
Flour factory at Ciudad Constitución

Agriculture it's concentrated in Santo Domingo Valley and employs 54 % of the poplation. There were 27,410.9 ha of crop land in the municipality. The main crops are potatoes, oranges, alfalfa, asparagus, wheat and chickpeas, there's also a small production of tomatoes, corn and green chilies. The meat production comes principally from pigs (474 tons), goats (333 tons) and sheep (108 tons). Comondú it's also the main producer of dairy products in Baja California Sur, mainly from cows and goats.

=== Fishing ===
The fishing sector it's the second economic activity in Comondú and it's concentrated in the coast of Pacific Ocean. There were 103,375 tons of fish products in 2021, of which fish represented more than 73% of the captures. Other products include shrimp, sharks and shellfish. There also processing centers of tuna and sardine.

=== Tourism ===
Whale watching at Puerto Adolfo López Mateos

The tourism sector has been growing in the last years. The municipality is home of two jesuit missions from XVII century, namely San Luis Gonzaga Chiriyaqui nearby Ciudad Constitución and San José de Comondú. There also minor rock art sites at Sierra la Giganta.

La Purísima Oasis

Ecotourism revolves around whale watching of gray whales at Magdalena Bay in Puerto San Carlos and Puerto Adolfo López Mateos during the months of December to April. Mulegé also has many popular oasis, mainly in the small towns of La Purísima and San José de Comondú.

== Notable people ==
- Gil Cueva Tabardillo, politician
