= Gil Cueva Tabardillo =

Mexican politician

Member of the Congress of Baja California Sur from the 9th district
- In office 15 March 2011 – 31 August 2015
- Preceded by: Luis Andrés Córdova Urrutia
- Succeeded by: Edson Jonathan Gallo Zavala

Personal details
- Born: Comondú Municipality, Baja California Sur, Mexico
- Citizenship: Mexico
- Party: PAN
- Spouse: Blanca González Pelayo

Gil Cueva Tabardillo is a Mexican politician representing the National Action Party (PAN). He served in the XIII Legislature of the Congress of Baja California Sur from 2011 to 2015.

== Political career ==
Before getting involved in politics, Cueva Tabardillo worked in agriculture.

Cueva Tabardillo assumed his seat in March 2011 as a local deputy in the Congress of Baja California Sur representing the 9th district of his native Comondú Municipality. He served as secretary on the standing committees for Agricultural-Livestock, Forestry and Mining Affairs (Asuntos Agropecuarios, Forestales y Mineros), Ecology (Ecología), and Water (Agua). He also served as the inaugural president of the Political Coordination Board (Junta de Gobierno y Coordinación Política).

In August 2014 he asked federal authorities to stop the overfishing by a dozen sardine boats in the Magdalena Bay on behalf of local fishermen from the town of Puerto San Carlos who rely on the bay's supply to make a living. In December he requested and was granted a temporary release from his duties to pursue personal projects in lieu of the upcoming 2015 elections – one of 13 members of the legislature to do so. A few months later he was involved in the effort to organize the inaugural SCORE International Baja Sur 500 off-road race from Cabo San Lucas to Loreto, the first-ever SCORE race to both start and finish in the state.

== Personal life ==
In January 2015, Cueva Tabardillo suffered a serious stroke and had to be taken to the state capital of La Paz for medical attention.

His sister, Silvia, served in the XI Legislature of the Congress of Baja California Sur.

He is married to Blanca González Pelayo, daughter of furniture businessman Encarnación "Chon" González.
