= Los Cabos =

Municipality in the Mexican state of Baja California Sur

Coordinates: 23°15′N 109°45′W

- Municipality
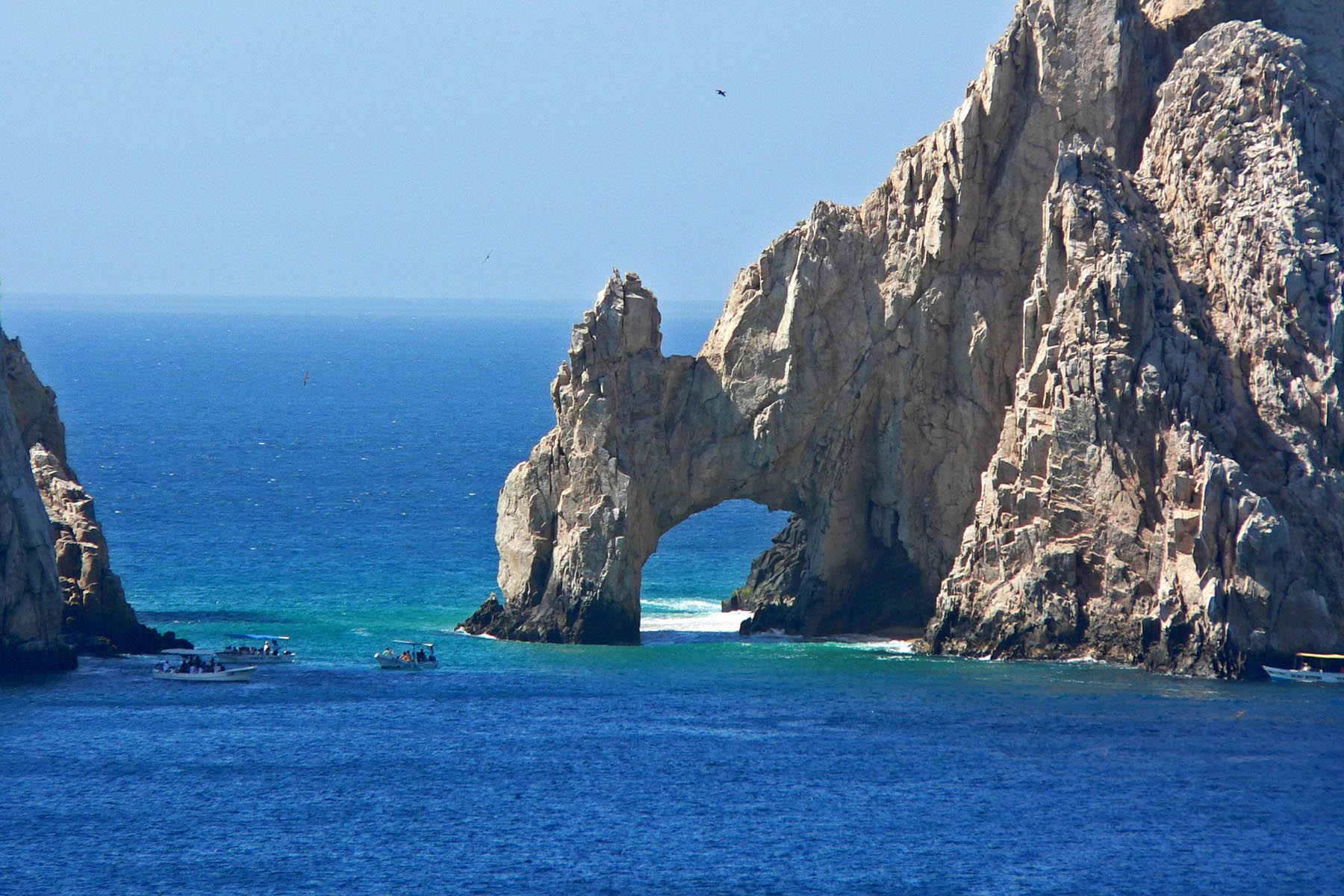
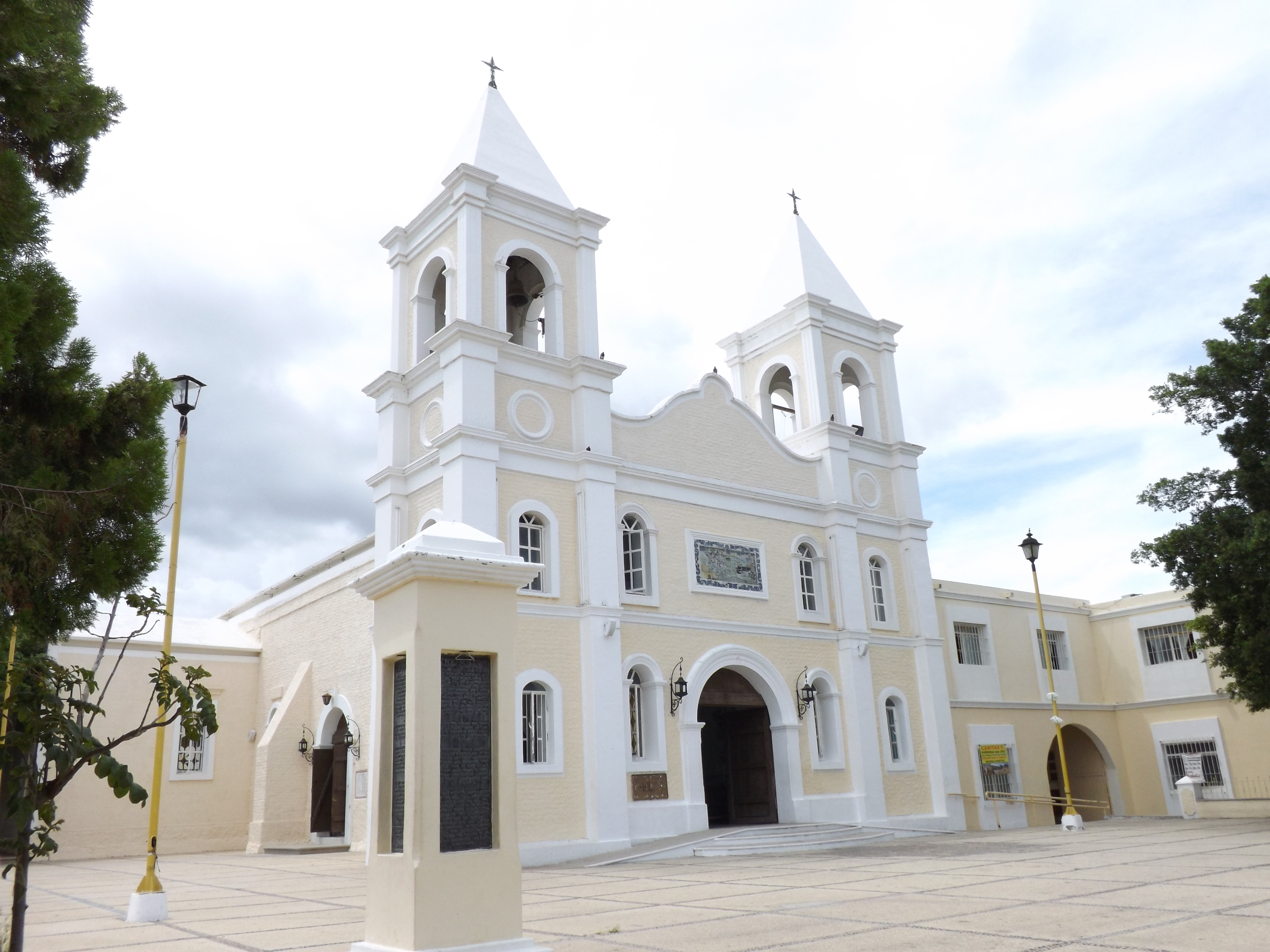
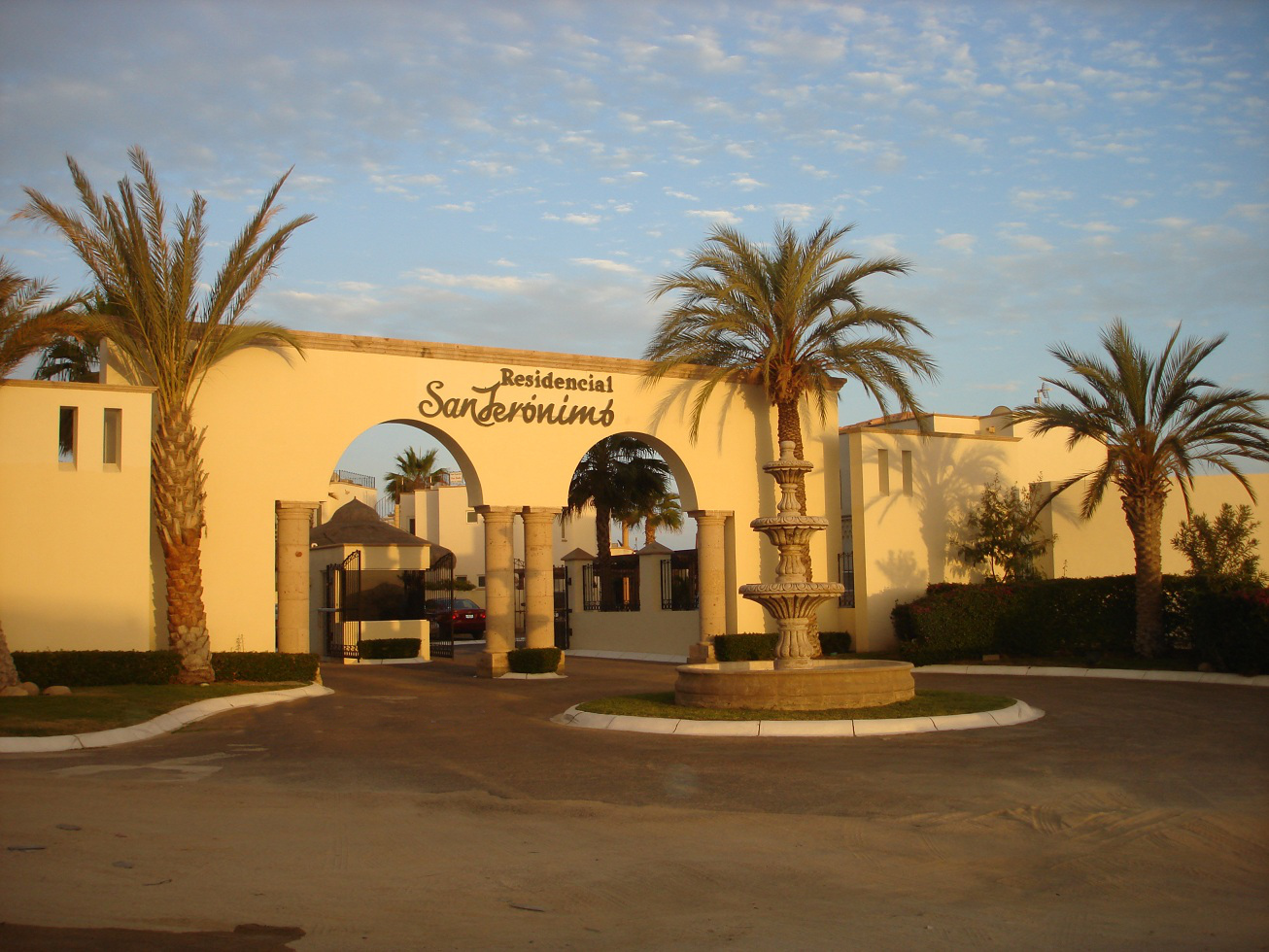
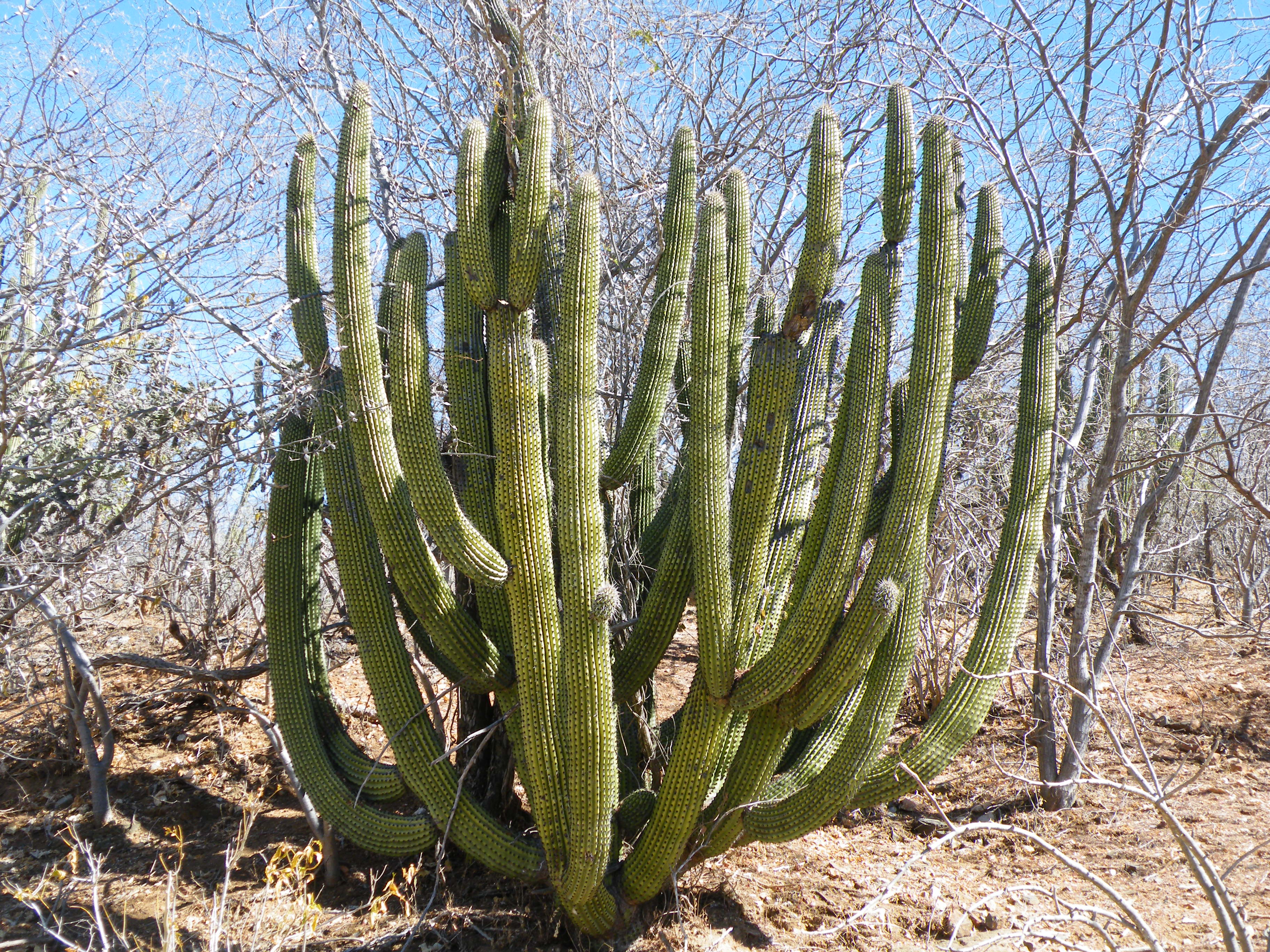
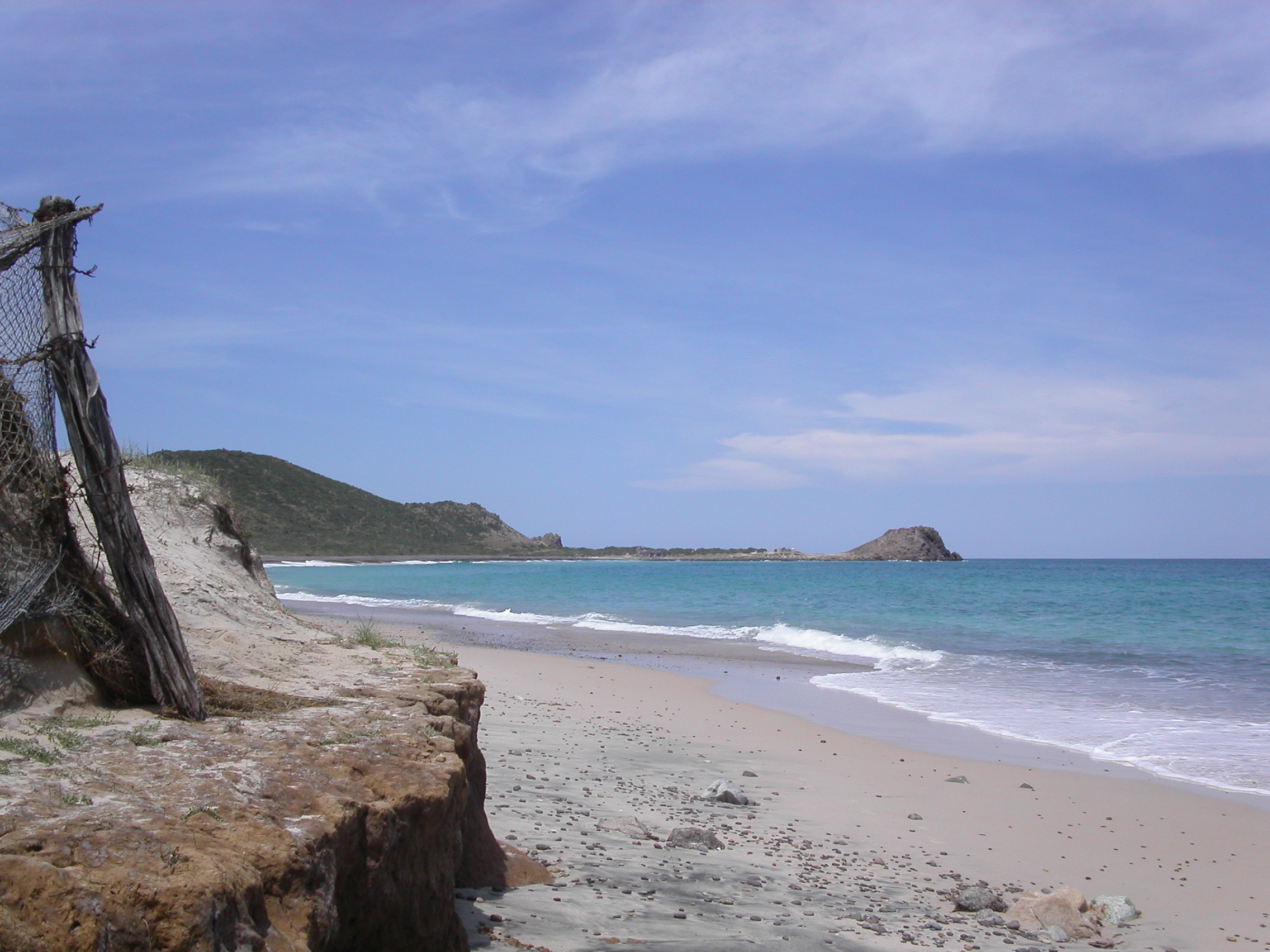
- Top: Arcos de Cabo San Lucas. Middle: Templo de San José del Cabo and residential housing development. Bottom: Sierra de la Laguna cactus, Cabo Pulmo National Park.

- Flag Coat of arms

- Location of Los Cabos on Baja California Sur's tip.
- Country: Mexico
- State: Baja California Sur
- Established: 1981
- Municipal seat: San José del Cabo
- Largest city: Cabo San Lucas

Area
  - Total: 3,750 km^{2} (1,450 sq mi)

Population (2020 census)
  - Total: 351,111
  - Density: 93.6/km^{2} (242/sq mi)
- Demonym: Cabeño(a)
- Time zone: UTC−07:00 (Zona Pacífico)
- Website: www.loscabos.gob.mx

Los Cabos (Spanish pronunciation: [los ˈkaβos]) is a municipality located at the southern tip of Mexico's Baja California Peninsula, in the state of Baja California Sur. It encompasses the two towns of Cabo San Lucas and San José del Cabo (the municipal seat) linked by the thirty-two-km Resort Corridor.

The area was remote and rural until the latter 20th century, when the Mexican government began to develop Cabo San Lucas for tourism, which then spread east to the municipal seat. The main draw is the climate and geography, where desert meets the sea, along with sport fishing, resorts and golf. This tourism is by far the main economic activity with over two million visitors per year. Over 1 million visit from the United States.

Although San José del Cabo is the seat of government for the municipality of Los Cabos, it is smaller than Cabo San Lucas. San José's growth is now rivaling that of the more famous resort area.

This growth has been regulated to outside of the town centre, especially to the south where the beaches are, leaving the historic town centre quiet and relatively unchanged. There are still cobblestone streets, adobe houses, jacaranda trees and a central square in front of a church that dates from the 18th century, where people gather in the evening when it is cooler.

A number of the large houses in the center date from the 19th century, and most of these have been converted into restaurants, art galleries and shops selling everything from fine handcrafts, silver, local gemstones and souvenirs. The art scene in the town is well-developed because of tourism and people with vacation homes. These shops carry high end paintings and sculptures from traditional Mexican, Mexican contemporary and international artisans and artists.

During the high season from October to May, these galleries stay open late into the night. The town has resisted the addition of large shopping malls and chain stores. There is also some colonial era architecture as well, but this style has more in common with colonial towns to the north into the United States rather than the centre and south of Mexico.

The main example of colonial architecture is the town's parish church. It was part of the Estero de las Palmas de San José del Cabo Mission, founded in 1730. The facade is marked with a tile mural depicting the martyrdom of founder Nicolás Tamaral, killed by the local Pericu people. The patron saint of the town is Saint Joseph, whose feast day is celebrated here on 19 March. Another important occasion is the feast of the Our Lady of the Pillar on 12 October. Occasions like these are marked with traditional dance in dress styles known as "Flor de Pitaya" and the "La Cuera."

Other important landmarks in the town include the municipal hall (palacio municipal), which dates from 1981 and the cultural centre or Casa de Cultura, housed in a 19th-century building.

The tourist area of the town is the area between the town proper and the shoreline. This area has a nine-hole golf course and a line of hotels and resorts facing the ocean, which served over 900,000 hotel guests in 2011.

== The municipality ==
=== Overview ===
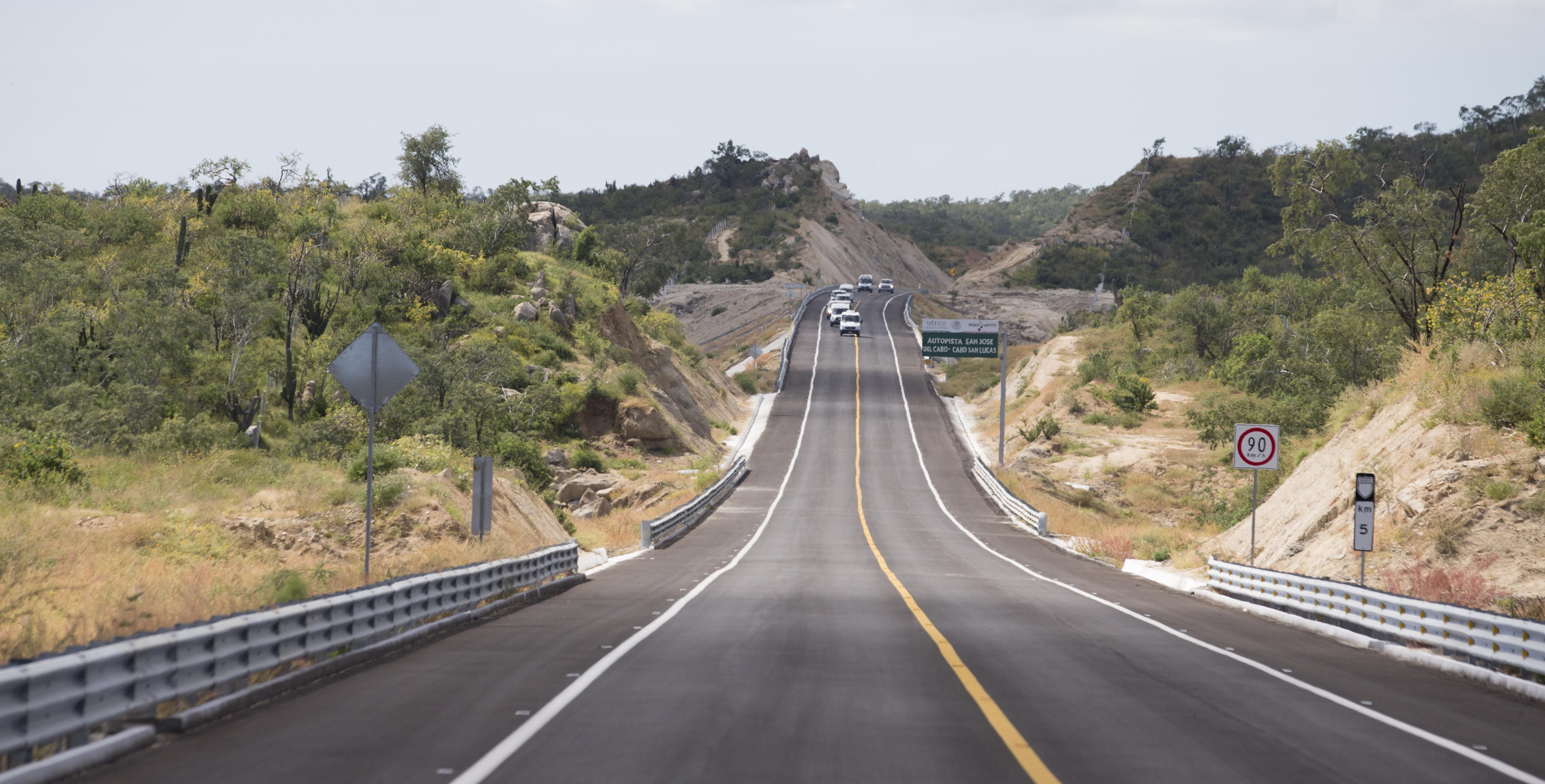
Autopista San José del Cabo–Cabo San Lucas

San Jose del Cabo is the seat and the government for the communities found in a 3,451.51 km^{2} area, located in the extreme south of the state of Baja California Sur. It is connected to the capital of La Paz via the Transpeninsular Highway.

The municipality borders that of La Paz to the north, with the Pacific Ocean and Gulf of California surrounding it in the other directions. The municipal government consists of a municipal president, a syndic and fourteen representatives called regidors.

The main areas of the municipality are the seat, Cabo San Lucas, and the tourist corridor along the coast between them. Although San Jose del Cabo is the government, Cabo San Lucas has a higher population and its natural arch at Land's End is the symbol for the municipality. Outside of the two main cities, other important communities include Colonia del Sol, Las Veredas, Colonia Los Congrejos, San José Viego and La Ribera.

The municipality is one of the most important tourist destinations in Mexico, for its fishing, beaches, and resorts. Historical landmarks are relatively few but include the municipal hall, the Casa de Cultura in San Jose del Cabo, the Faro Viejo and the San Jose del Cabo and Santiago de las Coras missions. The latter was founded in 1721 by Ignacio María Napoli.

=== Cabo San Lucas and the tourist corridor ===
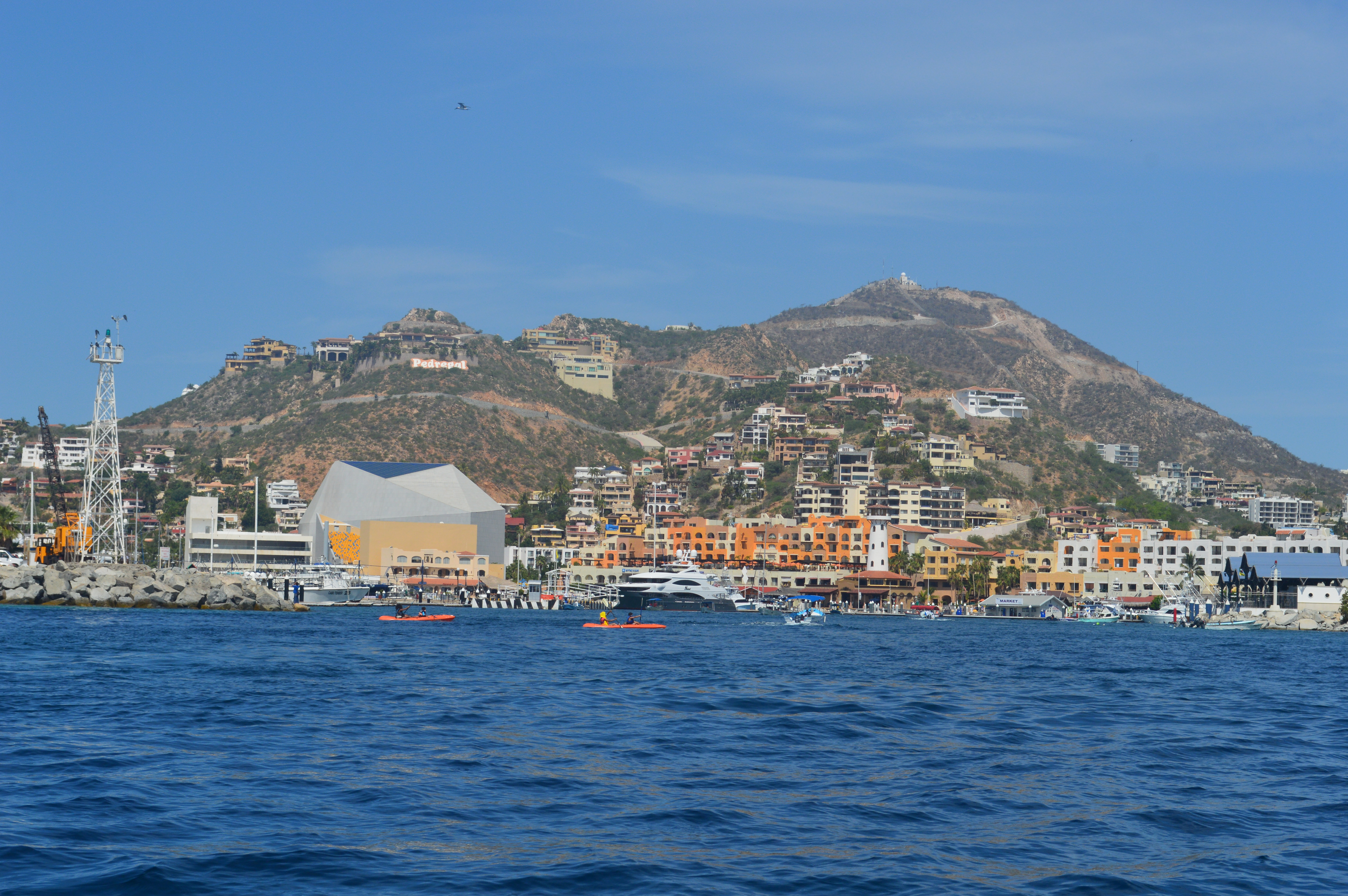
View of the port of Cabo San Lucas

The city of Cabo San Lucas, about 32 km (20 mi) to the west of San Jose del Cabo, is far more commercial. Unlike most Mexican towns, Cabo San Lucas has no main plaza or large cathedral. Instead, it is centered around the marina and entertainment district. Up until the latter 20th century, the area was a small fishing village when tourist infrastructure begun. Despite its success, high rise construction has been kept limited, focusing on resorts and sand-top restaurants in the beach area.

The main attractions are fishing, nightlife and whale watching. It is a place for vacation, where most visitors stay at all-inclusive resorts. The two main events during the year are Spring Break and Sammy Hagar's birthday which happens on the second weekend in October as his birthday is 13 October 1947. The latter focuses on his Cabo Wabo bar and restaurant in the city.

The success of Cabo San Lucas and San Jose del Cabo has created a tourist corridor along the coastal highway between the cities. While there has been some development of resorts, hotels, and golf courses, there are still smaller isolated and undeveloped beaches.

== Demographics ==
Historical population
Year	Pop.	±%
1970	9,077	—
1980	19,117	+110.6%
1990	43,920	+129.7%
1995	71,031	+61.7%
2000	105,469	+48.5%
2005	164,162	+55.6%
2010	238,487	+45.3%
2015	287,671	+20.6%
2020	351,111	+22.1%

With 351,111 inhabitants as at 2020, Los Cabos is the biggest municipality in terms of population in Baja California Sur. The municipality has 771 localities, of which two contain a majority of the population, namely Cabo San Lucas (202,694 pop.) and San José del Cabo (136,285). Other localities include La Ribera (2,320), Buenavista (705) and Santiago (644)..

== Socioeconomics ==
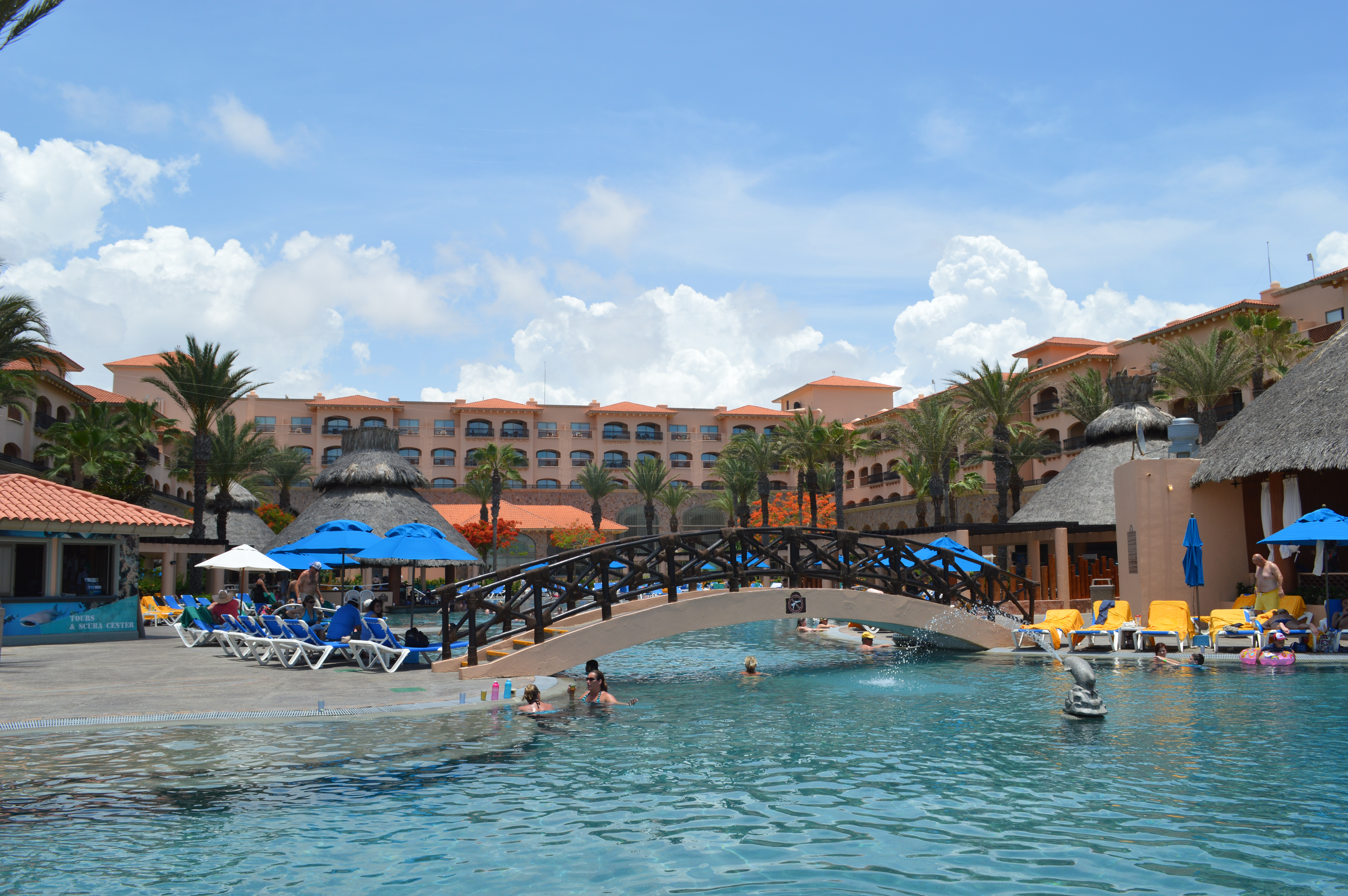
Royal Solaris resort in San Jose del Cabo

By far the main economic activity for the municipality is tourism, focused on a shoreline corridor between Cabo San Lucas and San Jose del Cabo. Most visitors come from the United States (especially California) and Canada, followed by Mexico, and many visitors return year after year. Visitors can get by in Cabo San Lucas purely in English and use U.S. dollars.

Most of the about two million visitors a year arrive by plane to the Los Cabos airport, but the Cabo San Lucas marina also has facilities for cruise ships. In 2012, the area has hotel occupancy of just over 60% with 248 cruise ships visiting. The area's high end resorts have also attracted notable names such as Bruce Willis, Kelly Preston and John Travolta, and San Jose del Cabo also has a notable expatriate population, mostly retirees who have economic influence.

The main draw for most visitors has been the environment, where the desert meets the sea, best symbolized by El Arco, a natural stone arch over the ocean in Cabo San Lucas where the Pacific Ocean and the Gulf of California meet. The natural features have led to ecotourism such as boat tours to El Arco, tours of the San Jose Estuary and the coral reefs of Cabo Pulmo, and whale watching from January to March, when the animals arrive to breed.

Sports fishing is a major and the longest established draw as there are about 800 species of fish in the waters off the coast. High season for this activity is in the summer, the season for marlin, although fishing for various other species extends all year. There are certain exotic species that are off limits due to conservation concerns and others are "catch-and-release" only.

There are four main golf courses in the municipality, designed by the likes of Jack Nicklaus and Pete Dye. Other activities for tourists include snorkeling, diving, dune-buggy rides, camel rides, zip-lining, rides on water-propelled jet packs, surfing (especially at the Acapulquito Beach), jet-ski riding, kayaking, sailing, horseback riding, ATV riding, hang gliding, mountain biking, camping, tennis and rappelling. Off the beaten path, there is the town of Miraflores (for its leather crafts), the Santiago fossil museum, the traditional towns of Caduaño, San Antonio and San Bartolo and a glass blowing factory.

Los Cabos hosts a culinary event called Ritmos, Colores y Sabores, which attracts chefs from the United States and Europe. The gastronomy of the region is based on seafood, which includes clams, marlin, snails, tuna and shark. A locally produced liquor is Damiana, sweet and flavored with a local herb, said to be an aphrodisiac.

The main export of the municipality is the production of salt. There are also limited mineral deposits, especially in the Capuano and Mezquite areas such as limestone and granite.

The small town of Miraflores is known for its leatherwork, especially saddles and other gear for horseback riding. Jewelry and decorations made with shells are produced in San José del Cabo, Cabo San Lucas and Santa Rosa.

Despite the development, 28.5% live in poverty and 5.6% live in extreme poverty; 18.1% live in substandard housing and 27.1% need food assistance. There are 313 schools from the primary to high school level. 9.3 years of schooling for those over 15. There are two vocational schools and twelve centers for adult education. There are no schools specifically targeting an indigenous population.

== Geography ==
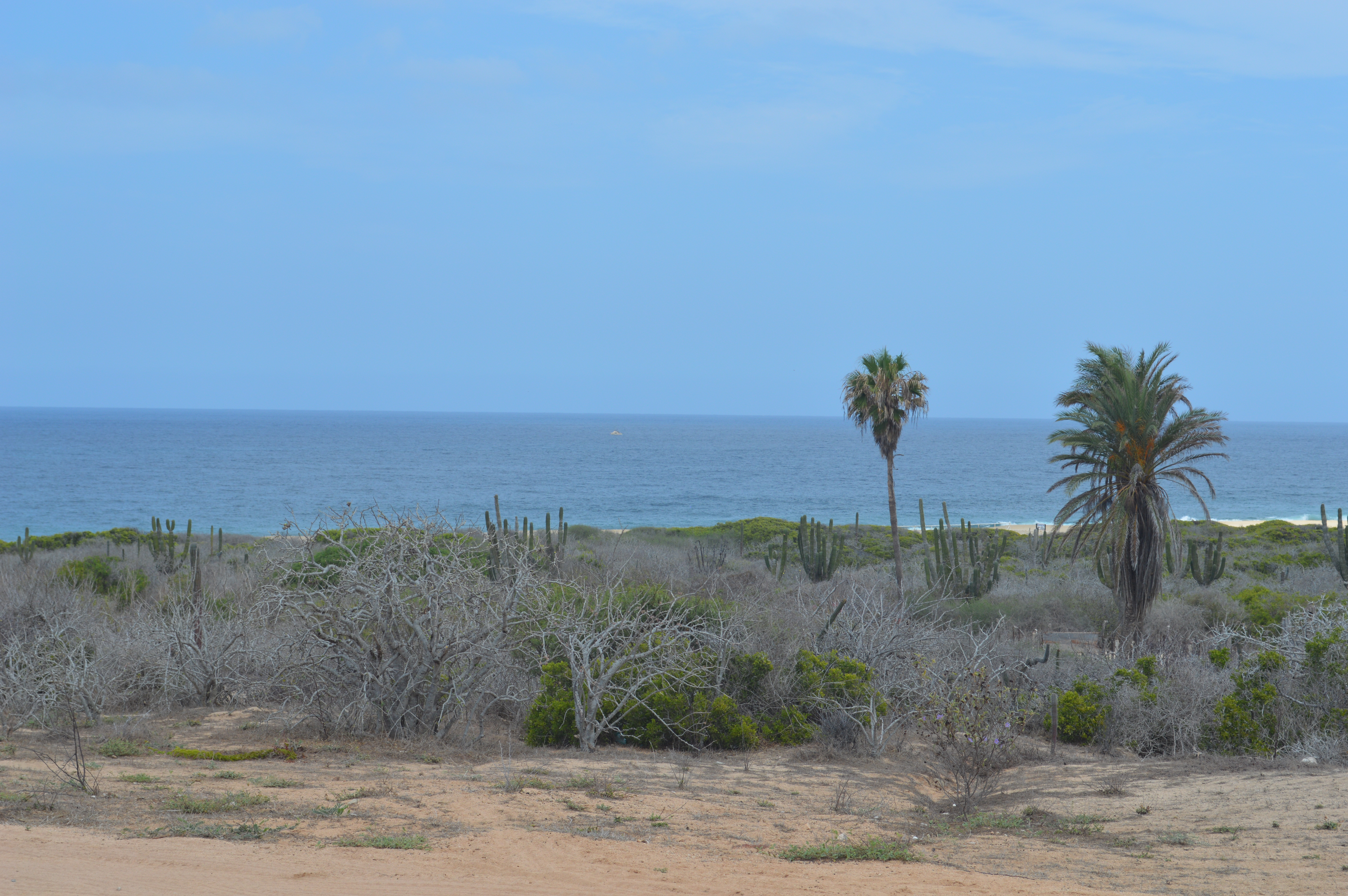
The desert and sea at Rancho Punta San Cristobal, Los Cabos

The municipality of Los Cabos is at the southern end of the Baja California peninsula, where desert meets the sea and the Gulf of Mexico meets the Pacific Ocean. The area was originally underwater, evidenced by the many fossils of marine animals, which are up to 25 million years old. The basement rock underlying Los Cabos formed even earlier, approximately 115 million years ago.

The municipality has an average altitude of forty meters above sea level. There are three main terrain types, mountain terrain, semi flat areas and flat areas. The mountains consist of the Sierra de la Laguna and the Sierra de San Lázaro, both formed of volcanic rock, covering about fifteen percent of the total territory with peaks between 400 and 1000 meters. The semi flat areas are located between the coast and the mountain ranges, mostly of sedimentary rock and account for sixty percent of the territory. The flat areas are along the coast, beaches and alluvial plains, which account for twenty five percent of the territory.

One of the main natural resources is the beaches. Major beaches include Los Frailes, Buena Vista, Agua Caliente, Cabo San Lucas, Puerto Chileno and Punta Colorada, often promoted together as the Costa de Oro (Golden Coast). One very popular beach in Cabo San Lucas is Lover's Beach, which is surrounded by dramatic rock shapes. The sea experiences lows of 72–73 °F (22–23 °C) in winter, and highs of 77–84 °F (25–29 °C) during the summer months.

Average Sea Temperature
Jan	Feb	Mar	Apr	May	Jun	Jul	Aug	Sep	Oct	Nov	Dec
73 °F 23 °C	72 °F 22 °C	72 °F 22 °C	72 °F 22 °C	73 °F 23 °C	77 °F 25 °C	81 °F 27 °C	84 °F 29 °C	84 °F 29 °C	84 °F 29 °C	81 °F 27 °C	77 °F 25 °C

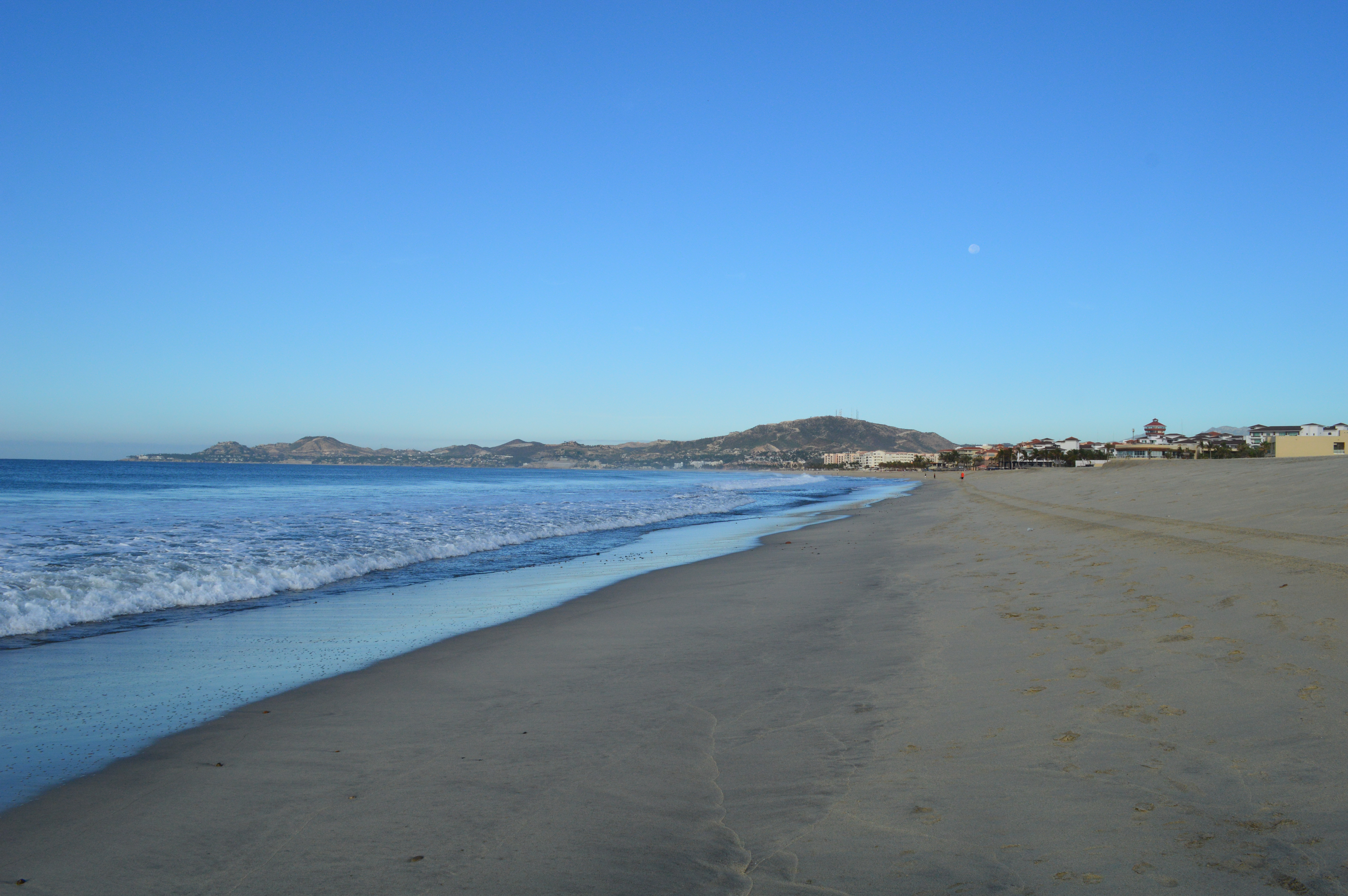
Beach at San Jose del Cabo

As it is on the edge of the desert that covers most of the Baja California peninsula, it is one of the sunniest locations in the world, with an average of 320 days of sunshine per year. The climate is characterized as hot and dry to the north of the town of San José del Cabo, hot and semi moist in San José and along the southern coast and temperate and dry in the highest elevations, because of cyclones that hit this area. Average annual temperature is 24C with the coolest month being January. There is a rainy season in the summer, with most rain in September. The rain and terrain make for a variety of micro climates, including areas with a climate similar to the Mediterranean. Areas between 0 and 400 meters are desert and semi-desert, with many areas having deep sand deposits. Higher elevations get more water and can have pine forests.

The main surface water of the municipality is the Río San José or San José River, which runs north to south, mostly during the rainy season. Other streams run only during rains and include Santiago, Miraflores, Caduaño and Las Palmas. There are subterranean deposits of water such as the Santiago and San José del Cabo, but the lack of water is the main impediment to human development in the area.

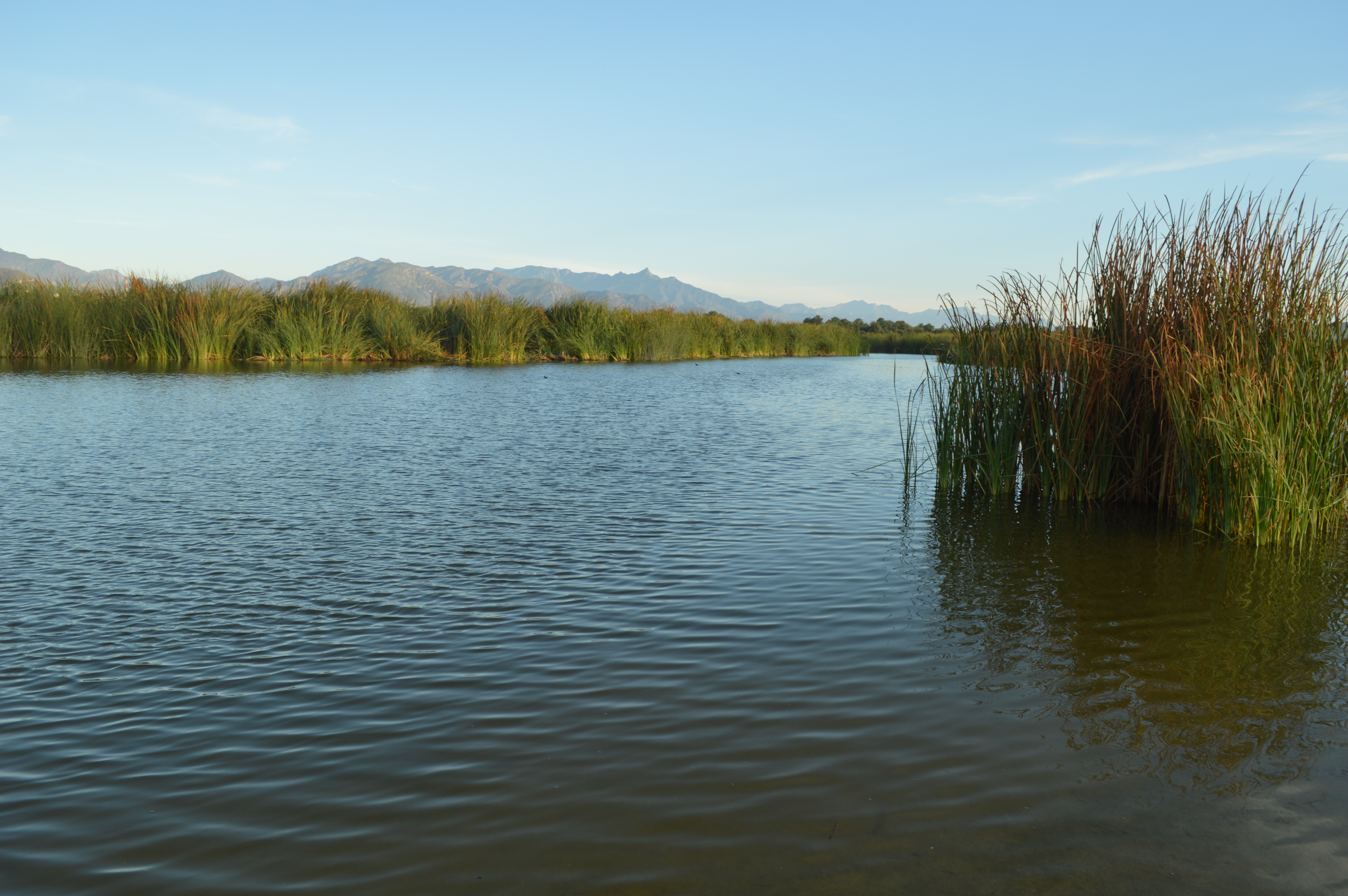
A view of the San Jose Estuary

The Río San José stops just shy of the ocean, with a one km long sand bar creating an estuary, the third largest in Mexico. This pooling of brackish water has created an oasis in the surrounding Sarcocaule desert. The Río San José flows largely underground for 40 miles (64 km) from its origin in the Sierra de la Laguna (Laguna Mountains), although its Miramonte River tributary adds almost an additional 10 miles (16 km). Its tributaries flow down the eastern side of the sierra and include Santa Rosa, Santa Lázaro, San Miguel, San Ignacio (at La Palma), Caduaño, Miraflores and San Bernard.

The river used to flow above ground until the beginning of the 20th century due to anthropogenic causes. For more than 250 years the Río San José has furnished drinking and irrigation water for the town of San Jose del Cabo, beginning as a source of fresh water for Spanish galleons traveling back from the Philippines. Over the sand bar from the estuary is a bay referred to by early Spanish explorers, including Sebastian Vizcaino, as the Bahía de San Bernabé or Bay of San Bernabé, and now as the Bay of San José del Cabo.

The estuary is home to both native and migratory birds and aquatic species, 250 species of tropical birds alone. Most of the migratory species use the area as a stopover on their way to southern Mexico, Central American and South America. It also acts as a nursery to many juvenile and larval stage species. It was declared a state environmental reserve, but pollution and excessive water extraction has caused it to degenerate, leading to a complaint by Greenpeace. One effort to improve the water situation is the creation of new water treatment plants in the 2000s.

Vegetation varies mostly by altitude and soil type and how much moisture the area receives. However, almost all species are those adapted to desert and semi-desert zones. The highest elevations have pine forests. Wildlife is varied and includes mammals such as badgers, skunks, coyotes, foxes, pumas and other wild cats, deer, raccoons, rabbits, bats and various rodents. Bird species include quail, doves, cardinals, woodpeckers, swallows and marine species such as pelicans and seagulls. There are over 850 species of aquatic animals off the coast such as marlin, sailfish, swordfish, tuna, dorado and whales. Many species and subspecies of both plants and animals are endemic only to Baja California.

== History ==
The indigenous Pericu names for San Jose del Cabo and Cabo San Lucas were Añiñi and Yenecami, respectively, with the current names given by the colonizing Spanish. The name of San José was given by Nicolás Tamaral in honor of José de la Fuente Peña y Castrejón, the Marquis of Villa Puente who sponsored the mission. The appendix of "de Los Cabos" is to distinguish it from San José de Comondú as well as its proximity to Cabo San Lucas. San Jose was also known as San Barnabé, as the nearby bay was named this. Pirate Thomas Cavendish called Cabo San Lucas "Safe Port" as he hid there from Spanish authorities. The seal for the municipality of Los Cabos (referring to the two cities) was approved by the state government in 1981.

When the Spanish arrived the main indigenous group in the area was the Pericus, a hunter-gather culture with Stone Age tools. It is possible that these people arrived to the region with a more evolved culture which later simplified to adapt to the harsh conditions. Evidence of this includes the region's cave paintings as the peoples found by the Jesuits did not have an artistic tradition. The Pericu people and culture were distinct from other indigenous groups, first by being taller and second by being polygamous in a tribal organization. Their diet consisted of local seeds and fruits, as well as fish, reptiles, and small mammals. Men were in charge of large game hunting of deer.

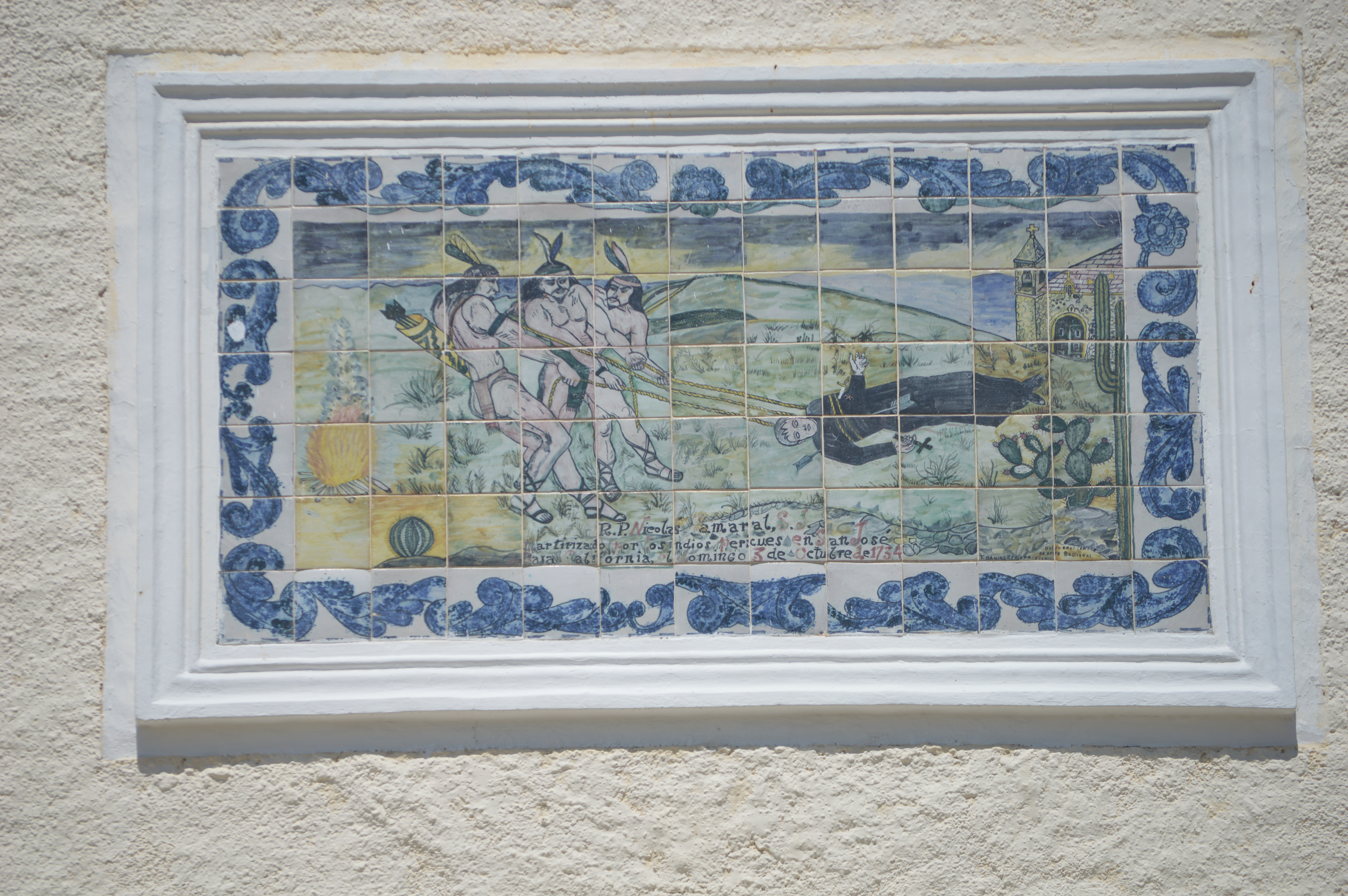
Tile mural on the San Jose del Cabo church depicting the martyrdom of Father Nicolas Tamaral

Hernán Cortés himself arrived here in 1535, and named the Gulf of California the Sea of Cortés (Mar de Cortés) the name still used for it in Spanish. The harsh conditions impeded colonization by the Spanish, which did not begin in earnest until 1730, when Father José Echeverría and Father Nicolás Tamaral founded a mission in what is now San Jose del Cabo in 1730. This date is considered the founding of the town, although a second ceremonial found took place in 1822, when it was declared a town of the Baja California territory.

Diseases brought by Europeans devastated indigenous groups here, and in 1768 more missionaries arrived. While colonization was slow, the area was important as a way station for the Manila Galleon and other ships, which stopped here for fresh water, as well as fruits and vegetables.

However, its remoteness also made it a place for pirates to hide. The first pirate in the area was Francis Drake in 1578, followed shortly after by Thomas Cavendish, both after the treasures from Spain's Asia trade. One major attack was that on the Santa Ana Galleon, whose looting caused the Spanish colonial government to explore and map the area around Cabo San Lucas at the very beginning of the 17th century. There were recommendations to establish a mission here, but this was rejected in favor of Loreto. This left Cabo San Lucas as a strategic hideout for English pirates until the 18th century. In 1709, pirate Woodes Rogers attacked the Nuestra Señora de la Encarnación y Desengaño. Hiding nearly a month in Cabo San Lucas, he also mapped the area and wrote detailed descriptions. He was followed by George Shelvocke in 1721, who later published the oldest known drawings of the Pericues.

After Independence, the Baja Peninsula was part of the California province, but Cabo San Lucas was named head of a municipality. Its remoteness kept the area out of active participation of most of Mexico's 19th and early 20th century tumultuous history. One exception was the Mexican American War. Resistance to U.S. forces was organized in the small community of Santa Anita, near San José, headed by José Matías Moreno, Vicente Mejia and José Antonio Mijares, who was in charge of the marina at Cabo San Lucas. One of the main streets in the town is now named after Mijares, who died defending the town.

The major political players during the Mexican Revolution were Manuel Gonzalez and Pedro Orozco, along with Félix Ortega. In 1915, Ildefonso Green Ceseña, head of forces loyal to Venustiano Carranza, drove out those of Francisco Villa out of the southern part of the peninsula.

Some development of the area began after the Mexican Revolution with a lighthouse at Cabo Falso as early as 1905, just southwest of Cabo San Lucas, in part to remind U.S. ships in the waters here that the territory remained Mexican. Today, it is known as the "Faro Viejo" (Old Lighthouse) and is a historic monument. In 1917, a U.S. company began tuna fishing operations here and had a floating processing plant. In 1927, the Compañía de Productos Marinas based its operations in Cabo San Lucas and helped develop the port to make it open to tourism later. In the 1920s, the first road connecting San José del Cabo and Cabo San Lucas was begun but not completely finished until 1970.

For the most part, the area remained rural and undeveloped until the latter 20th century, when the federal agency Fonatur began to develop a tourism industry here. Development began with Cabo San Lucas for vacationers, but then spread to San Jose del Cabo, but with a different direction with more art galleries and promotion of its traditional Mexican character.

The current municipality of Los Cabos was created in 1981, separated from the municipality of La Paz, with the seat at San Jose del Cabo. The town had previously been a municipal seat of a municipality of the same name in 1917 but lost this in a political reorganization in 1972.

Mayor Armida de Jesús Castro Guzmán quit MORENA on March 1, 2021, because of sexism by the party's state leader, Alberto Rentería Santana, and because he did not support her reelection.

As of March 1, 2021, the municipality reported 7,796 recoveries, 209 active cases, and 404 deaths from the COVID-19 pandemic in Mexico.

== See also ==
- Mexican Riviera
- Tourism in Mexico
