= Municipalities of Baja California Sur =

List of municipalities of Mexican state

Map of Mexico with Baja California Sur highlighted

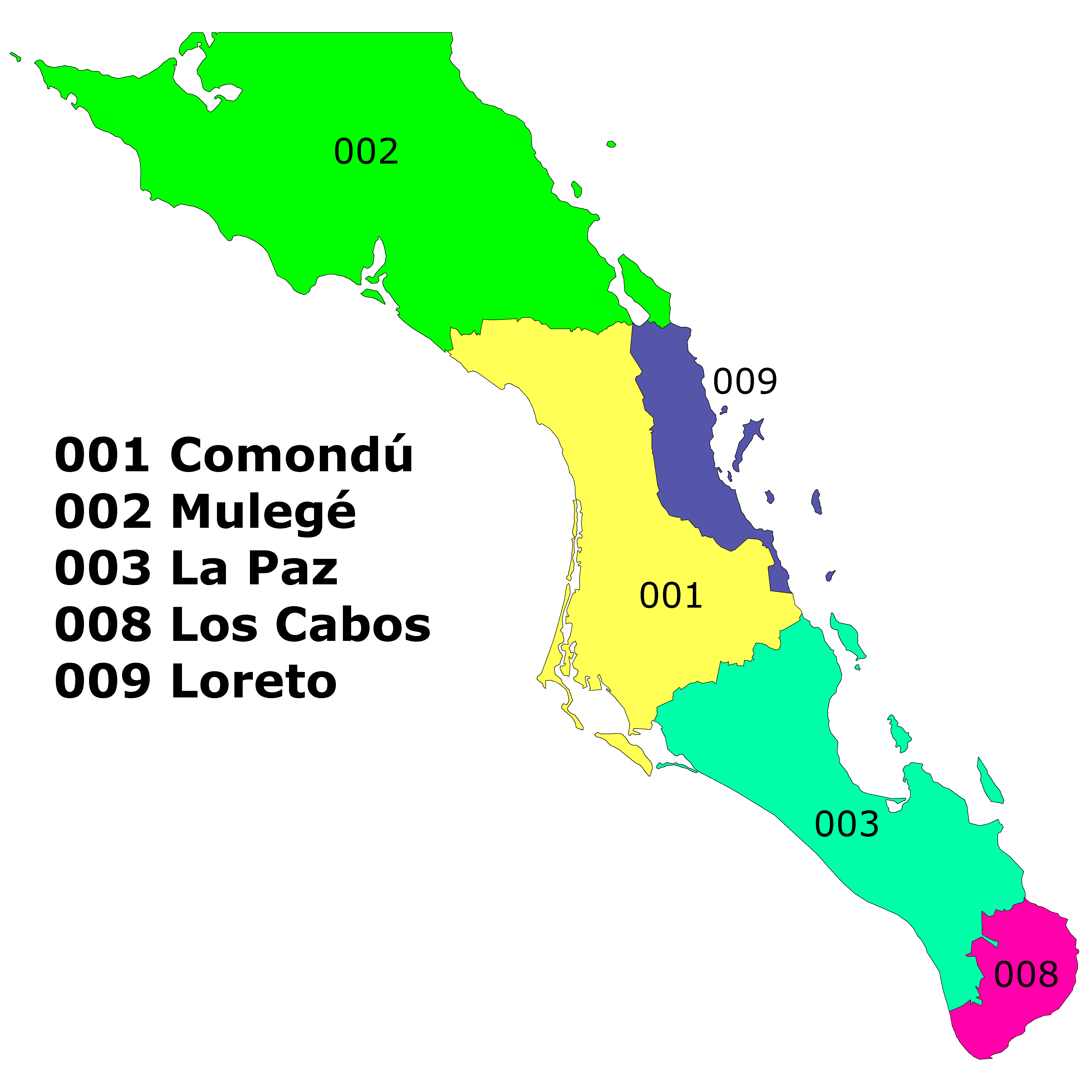
Municipalities of Baja California Sur since 1992.

Baja California Sur is a state in northwest Mexico divided into five municipalities. According to the 2020 INEGI census, Baja California Sur is the second least populous state with 798,447 inhabitants and the 11th largest by land area, spanning 73,909.4 square kilometres (28,536.6 sq mi).

Municipalities in Baja California Sur are administratively autonomous of the state according to the 115th article of the 1917 Constitution of Mexico. Every three years, citizens elect a municipal president (Spanish: presidente municipal) by a plurality voting system who heads a concurrently elected municipal council (ayuntamiento) responsible for providing all the public services for their constituents. The municipal council consists of a variable number of trustees and councillors (regidores y síndicos). Municipalities are responsible for public services (such as water and sewerage), street lighting, public safety, traffic, and the maintenance of public parks, gardens and cemeteries. They may also assist the state and federal governments in education, emergency fire and medical services, environmental protection and maintenance of monuments and historical landmarks. Since 1984, they have had the power to collect property taxes and user fees, although more funds are obtained from the state and federal governments than from their own income.

The largest municipality by population in Baja California Sur is Los Cabos, with 351,111 residents, and the smallest is Loreto with 18,052 residents. The largest municipality by area in Baja California Sur and second largest in Mexico is Mulegé, which spans 32,009.90 km^{2} (12,359.09 sq mi), while Los Cabos is the smallest at 3,751.50 km^{2} (1,448.46 sq mi). The first municipality to incorporate was Loreto on July 2, 1822, and the newest municipality is Los Cabos which incorporated April 10, 1980.

== Municipalities ==
Largest municipalities in Baja California Sur by population

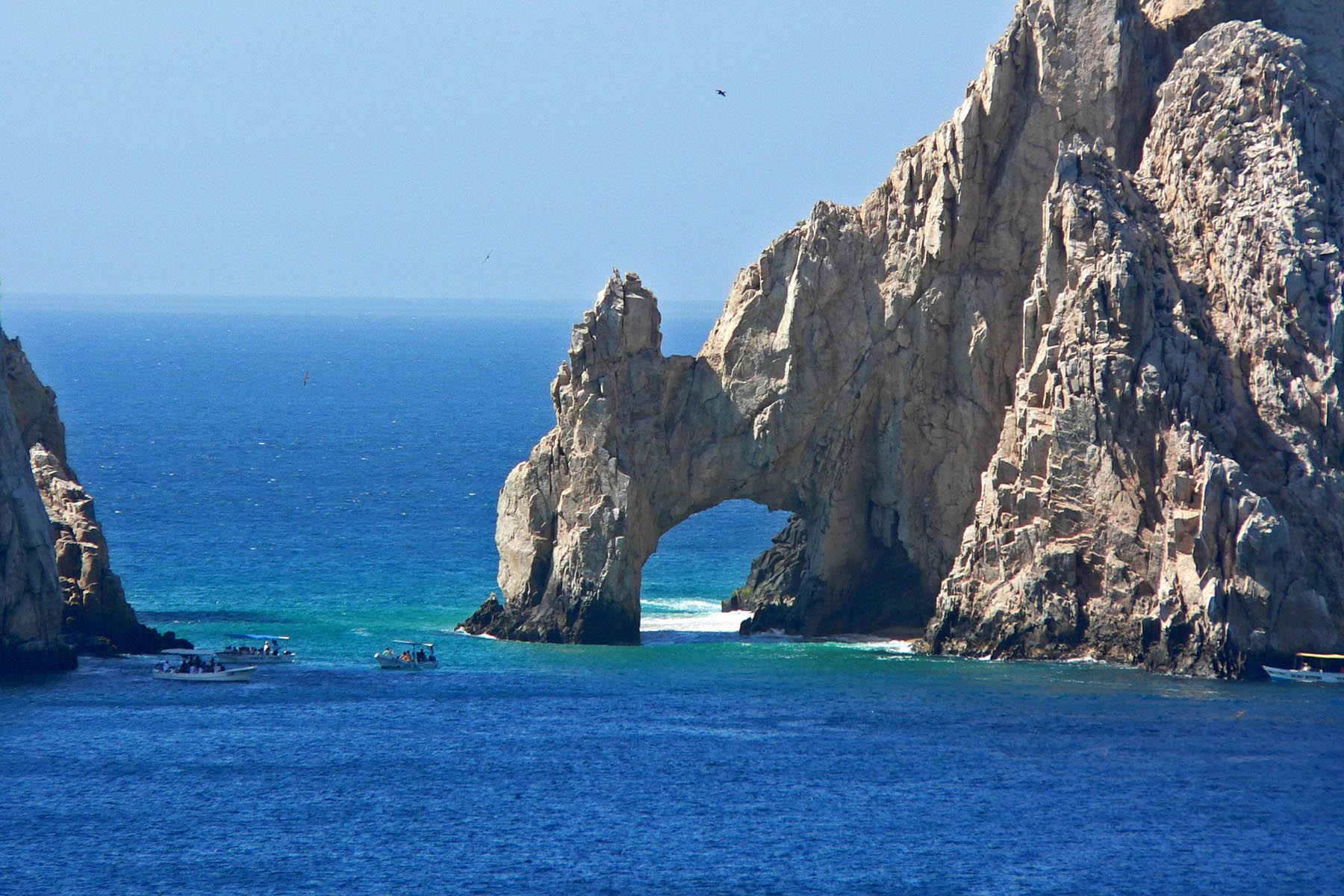
Los Cabos, largest municipality by population in Baja California Sur

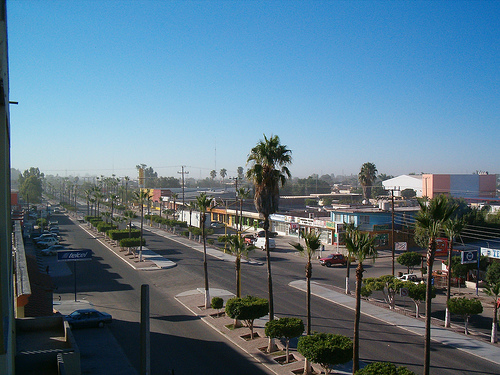
Ciudad Constitución in Comondú, third largest municipality by population.

† State capital

Municipalities of Baja California Sur
Name	Municipal seat	Population (2020)	Population (2010)	Change	Land area		Population density (2020)	Incorporation date
Name	Municipal seat	Population (2020)	Population (2010)	Change	km^{2}	sq mi	Population density (2020)	Incorporation date
Comondú	Ciudad Constitución	73,021	70,816	+3.1%	18,318.60	7,072.85	4.0/km^{2} (10.3/sq mi)	April 22, 1850
La Paz†	La Paz	292,241	251,871	+16.0%	15,413.70	5,951.26	19.0/km^{2} (49.1/sq mi)	February 16, 1831
Loreto	Loreto	18,052	16,738	+7.9%	4,415.60	1,704.87	4.1/km^{2} (10.6/sq mi)	July 2, 1822
Los Cabos	San José del Cabo	351,111	238,487	+47.2%	3,751.50	1,448.46	93.6/km^{2} (242.4/sq mi)	April 10, 1980
Mulegé	Santa Rosalía	64,022	59,114	+8.3%	32,009.90	12,359.09	2.0/km^{2} (5.2/sq mi)	April 22, 1850
Baja California Sur	—	798,447	637,026	+25.3%	73,909.4	28,536.58	10.8/km^{2} (28.0/sq mi)	—
Mexico	—	126,014,024	112,336,538	+12.2%	1,972,550	761,606	63.9/km^{2} (165.5/sq mi)	—
