= Ciudad Insurgentes =

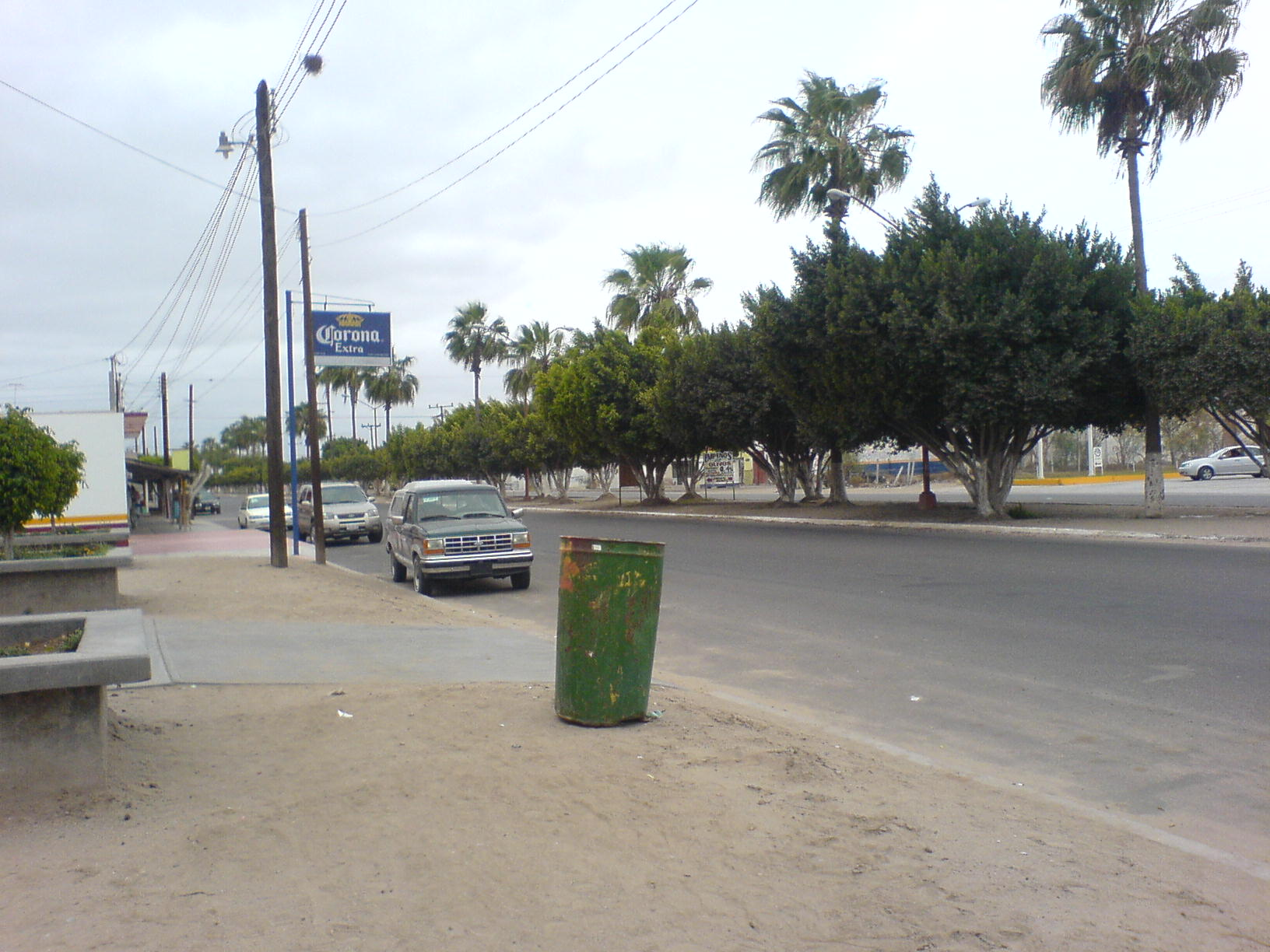
- Ciudad Insurgentes

- Location in Baja California Sur
- Coordinates: 25°15′42″N 111°46′28″W
- Country: Mexico
- State: Baja California Sur
- Municipality: Comondú
- Elevation: 98 ft (30 m)

Population (2020)
  - Total: 9,133
- Time zone: UTC−7 (Pacific (US Mountain))

Ciudad Insurgentes is a city in the Mexican state of Baja California Sur. It is the second-largest community in the municipality of Comondú and is located 250 kilometers north of La Paz, Baja California Sur, and 175 kilometers south of Loreto, Baja California Sur. Ciudad Insurgentes's population was 9,133 inhabitants in the 2020 census.
