= Cabo Pulmo National Park =

National marine park on Mexico's Baja California Peninsula

- Parque Nacional Cabo Pulmo
- IUCN category II (national park)
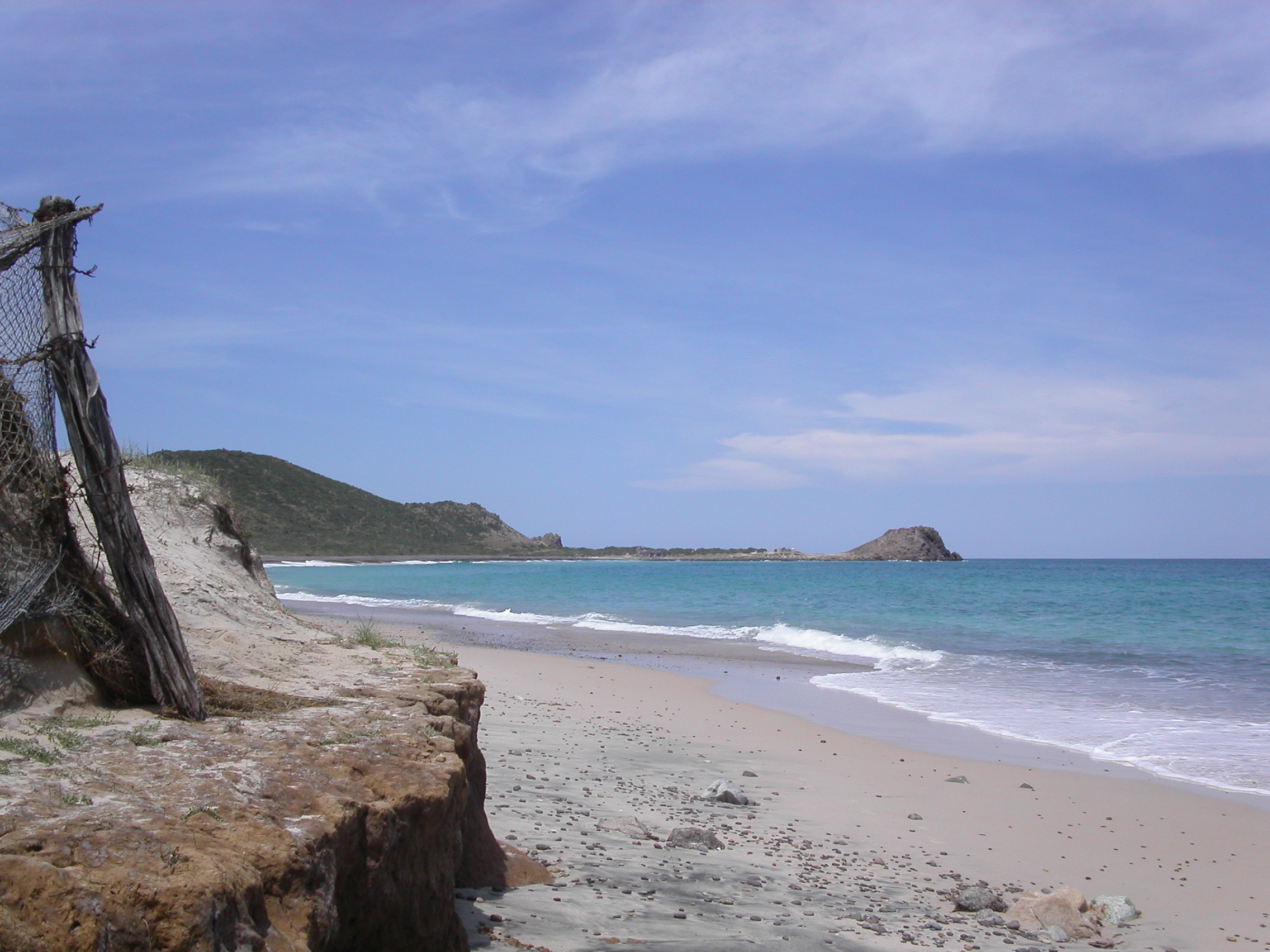
- Beach at Cabo Pulmo

- Location within Baja California Sur Location within Mexico
- Location: Off Baja California Sur, Mexico
- Nearest city: Cabo San Lucas
- Coordinates: 23°26′01″N 109°25′28″W
- Area: 71.11 km^{2}; 17,570 acres (7,111 ha)
- Established: June 5, 1995; 31 years ago
- Governing body: National Commission of Protected Natural Areas

UNESCO World Heritage Site
- Official name: Islands and Protected Areas of the Gulf of California
- Type: Natural
- Criteria: vii, ix, x
- Designated: 2005 (29th session)
- Reference no.: 1182
- Region: Latin America and the Caribbean
- Endangered: 2019–present

Ramsar Wetland
- Official name: Parque Nacional Cabo Pulmo
- Designated: 2 February 2008
- Reference no.: 1778

Cabo Pulmo National Park (Spanish: Parque Nacional Cabo Pulmo) is a national marine park on the east coast of Mexico's Baja California Peninsula, spanning the distance between Pulmo Point and Los Frailes Cape, approximately 100 kilometres (62 mi) north of Cabo San Lucas in the Gulf of California. Bahía Pulmo is home to the oldest of only three coral reefs on the west coast of North America. Cabo Pulmo is estimated to be 20,000 years old. The 27 square mile national park is home to 11 different species of coral. It is the northernmost coral reef in the eastern Pacific Ocean.

The reef has a number of colonies of hard coral atop rock outcroppings that run parallel to the coast, occurring in progressively deeper water offshore. After organizing by local community groups, the area was designated a national park in 1995, a UNESCO World Heritage Site in 2005, and a Ramsar Wetland of International Importance in 2008. The conservation of the park, has been important for a local ecosystem recovery from overfishing as well as an improvement to the local economic wellbeing. Since its conservation, the park has been subject to broad international attention as a model for creating governance for Marine protected areas.

== History ==
On June 5, 1995, newly elected as of December 1995, Mexican President Ernesto Zedillo declared the 71.11-square-kilometre (27.46 sq mi) area surrounding Cabo Pulmo a federally protected National Marine Park. On May 2, 1997, Jose Luis Pepe Murrieta was the first volunteer Park Director appointed by the INE (National Ecological Institute).Universidad Autónoma de Baja Calif came in to research local fishing patterns and ways to protect the fish populations, they ended up helping to lobby the government into assisting their protection efforts.

The non-profit organization Patronato Cabo del Este, founded in 1997, was (and still is) Cabo Pulmo's primary supporting organization while the federal government built a budget for the park. A community organization known as Amigos para la Conservación de Cabo Pulmo ("Friends for the Conservation of Cabo Pulmo", or ACCP) was founded in 2002 to promote conservation of the natural resources of the park. Carlos Narro was appointed the first official Park Director by the National Commission of Protected Natural Areas (CONANP), a branch of the federal Secretariat of Environment and Natural Resources, in 2004. To better the local community of Cabo Pulmo these groups came together to form a group called Cabo Pulmo Vivo. This group serves to make the community a place that its residents love.

In 2005, Cabo Pulmo was inscribed on the UNESCO World Heritage List as part of a larger serial property known as the Islands and Protected Areas of the Gulf of California, in recognition of the Gulf's exceptionally rich biodiversity, high marine productivity, species endemism, and striking natural beauty. The management plan for the park wasn't finalized until 2009.

Since 2019 the site is included in the list of the World Heritage in Danger, because of the imminent extinction of the vaquita, an endemic porpoise in the gulf.

== Conservation ==
Before establishment of the park the area was heavily overfished. Creating the national park and policing it has been beneficial to the marine ecosystem. While the protection of the National Park is active, there are not always the resources to fully enforce the rules. To prevent overfishing, in 1995 Cabo Pulmo National Park put into effect a non-fishing strategy which would be proven effective in 2010, with the area having a reported increase in total fish abundance of 462%.

The increase is attributed to increased efforts to reduce fishing and other high impact activities inside park boundaries and an improvement in the health of the reef itself. In the process of improving the conservation, both fisherman and other members of the community working in tourism and other industries benefiting from the park had improved economic sustainability.

Research shows that the conservation of the park also led to the community of Cabo Pulmo finding sustainability through tourism brought in to explore and dive in the National Park. The Local community of Cabo Pulmo was able to set up dive shops and small tourist attractions.

Other research shows that although the introduction and increase of tourism in the park might have economic gains for the local community, the potential damage to the ecosystems might be detrimental.

== Research ==
Scientists studying reef fish communities have found that the depth of the reef system at Cabo Pulmo has significant positive effect on the number of species present and their populations. Researchers explain that big predators such as whales, dolphins, or sea lions enjoy taking dives to the deeper coral at around 40 to 50 feet.
