= San Carlos, Baja California Sur =

Puerto San Carlos
- Nickname: San Carlos
- Location in Baja California Sur Puerto San Carlos (Baja California Sur)
- Coordinates: 24°47′22″N 112°6′30″W
- Country: Mexico
- State: Baja California Sur
- Municipality: Comondú

Population (2020)
  - Total: 5,742

San Carlos, also known as Puerto San Carlos, is a fishing community facing the Pacific Ocean, in Magdalena Bay of Baja California Sur, Mexico. It is located in Comondú Municipality and had a 2020 census population of 5,742.
