= Misión San José de Comondú =

18th-century Spanish mission in Baja California Sur, Mexico

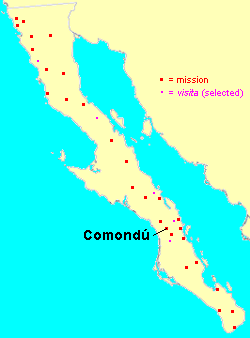

Mission San José de Comondú was one of the Jesuit missions established early in the 18th century in Baja California Sur, Mexico, west of Loreto on an arroyo flowing to the Pacific coast. Over the course of its existence, the mission was twice relocated.

== Etymology ==
The mission was named after Saint Joseph and the indigenous Cochimí settlement of Comondú.

== History ==
"Comondú Viejo" was established in 1708 by the missionary Julián de Mayorga and financed by the Marqués de Villapuente de la Peña and his wife the Marquesa de las Torres de Rada. The location proved less than ideal as an agricultural settlement. A smallpox epidemic in 1710 killed half of the mission's neophytes. The mission was moved to its second site in 1736, and Comondú Viejo became a visita or subordinate mission station. The foundations of the chapel and portions of an irrigation system survive.

The new location for Comondú was located about 50 kilometers to the southwest, at what had previously been the visita of San Miguel. This location was reduced back to visita status in 1737, although many structural remnants of the mission survive.

The final location for the mission was about 3 kilometers upstream from San Miguel. First adobe structures and, after 1750, a large stone building were erected. However, the neophyte population declined from more than 300 in 1740 to 80 in 1768 and 28 in 1800. The mission ceased to function in 1827. Substantial architectural remnants survived into the 20th century, but the existing buildings have been extensively renovated.

== Destruction ==
It is told a governor ordered the mission's remains demolished using dynamite in 1930 in order to use the consequent stone from the ruins, in order to build a school. It is remarkable, given stone abounds in the region.

== See also ==
- Missions in Baja California Sur
- List of Jesuit sites
