= Inaja Band of Diegueno Mission Indians =

Native Kumeyaay Indians in Southern California

Inaja Band of Diegueño Mission Indians
Total population
- 15–16

Regions with significant populations
- United States (California)

Languages
- Ipai, Kumeyaay, English, Yuman branch of Hokan linguistic group.

Religion
- Traditional tribal religion, Christianity (Roman Catholicism)

Related ethnic groups
- other Kumeyaay tribes, Cocopa, Quechan, Paipai and Kiliwa

The Inaja Band of Diegueño Mission Indians of the Inaja and Cosmit Reservation is a federally recognized tribe of Kumeyaay Indians, who are sometimes known as Mission Indians.

== Reservation ==
Location of the Inaja and Cosmit Reservation

The Inaja and Cosmit Reservation (33°00′38″N 116°38′30″W) is a federal Indian reservation located 36 miles in northeastern San Diego County, California, near Julian. It is accessible via Interstate 8 east and California Route 67 north. The reservation is 880 acres (3.6 km^{2}) large with a population of approximately 15. The reservation consists of two parcels of land, one Inaja, the other Cosmit, that sit at the base the Cuyamaca Peak and is accessed only by the unpaved, county-maintained, Boulder Creek Rd. Older houses exist at Inaja, but harsh winter conditions and a lack of facilities hinder development. Cosmit used to have residences and tribal dances and fiestas in years past.

The reservation was established in 1875. Since 1973, none of the 21 enrolled members lived on the reservation. The Tribe is federally recognized and the United States Census Bureau continues to survey the community.

== Demographics ==
=== 2020 census ===
Inaja and Cosmit Reservation, California – Racial and ethnic composition Note: the US Census treats Hispanic/Latino as an ethnic category. This table excludes Latinos from the racial categories and assigns them to a separate category. Hispanics/Latinos may be of any race.
Race / Ethnicity (NH = Non-Hispanic)	Pop 2000	Pop 2010	Pop 2020	% 2000	% 2010	% 2020
White alone (NH)	0	0	0	0.00%	0.00%	0.00%
Black or African American alone (NH)	0	0	0	0.00%	0.00%	0.00%
Native American or Alaska Native alone (NH)	0	0	0	0.00%	0.00%	0.00%
Asian alone (NH)	0	0	0	0.00%	0.00%	0.00%
Native Hawaiian or Pacific Islander alone (NH)	0	0	0	0.00%	0.00%	0.00%
Other race alone (NH)	0	0	0	0.00%	0.00%	0.00%
Mixed race or Multiracial (NH)	0	0	0	0.00%	0.00%	0.00%
Hispanic or Latino (any race)	0	0	0	0.00%	0.00%	0.00%
Total	0	0	0	100.00%	100.00%	100.00%

== Government ==
Members of the Inaja-Cosmit Band belong to the Kumeyaay Nation. Tribal lands of the Kumeyaay Nation extend from San Diego and Imperial counties in California to territories 60 miles south of the Mexican border The Inaja Band is headquartered in Escondidio. They are governed by a democratically elected tribal council. Rebecca Maxcy Osuna is their current tribal chairperson.

The tribe's Department of Housing and Urban Development received a $20,881 grant to rehabilitate tribal housing to make them more energy efficient, under the American Recovery and Reinvestment Act of 2009.

== Religions ==
Christianity and Roman Catholicism are the two most dominant forms of religions practiced amongst the Inaja tribe today. The Roman Catholic church plays a very vital role in every day living amongst the Inaja community, with 1.27 billion members of the church worldwide, the Inaja band mission Indians are a part of this religious practice. The adoption of Roman Catholicism being the oldest religious institutions in the world, has played a very vital role in shaping the way the Inaja band mission Indians beliefs.

== Ethnic groups ==
The Kumeyaay, called the Tipai-Ipai and Kamia or Diegueño, are seen as the native people of the southwestern California region. These clans of natives inhabit southern California and Baja California in Mexico. The Cocopah, or called the Cocopá or Kwapa, are also clans who live in Baja California of the United States. The Cocopah language belongs to the Delta–California branch of the Yuman family. The Quechan or Yuma are languages of the Inaja people of California just north of the Mexican border. The Paipai are the aboriginal people of northern Baja California, Mexico. Their land lies between the Kiliwa on the south and the Kumeyaay and Cocopa on the north, extending from San Vicente near the Pacific coast. The Kiliwa also are the aboriginal people of northern Baja California, Mexico. They occupied a territory lying between the Cochimí on the south and the Paipai on the north, and extending from San Felipe on the Gulf of California to San Quintín on the Pacific coast

== Education ==
The reservation is served by the Julian Union Elementary School District and Julian Union High School District.

== Bibliography ==
- Pritzker, Barry M. (2000). A Native American Encyclopedia: History, Culture, and Peoples. Oxford University Press. ISBN 978-0-19513-877-1.
- Shipek, Florence C. (1978). "History of Southern California Mission Indians". In Heizer, Robert F. (ed.). Handbook of North American Indians. Vol. 8: California. Washington, DC: Smithsonian Institution. pp. 610–618. ISBN 978-0-16004-574-5.
- Eargle, Dolan H. Jr (2000). Native California Guide: Weaving the Past & Present. San Francisco: Tree Company Press. ISBN 978-0-93740-110-1.
- Luomala, Katharine (1978). "Tipai-Ipai". In Heizer, Robert F. (ed.). Handbook of North American Indians. Vol. 8: California. Washington, DC: Smithsonian Institution. pp. 592–609. ISBN 978-0-16004-574-5.
- Hohenthal, William D. (2001). Blackburn, Thomas (ed.). Tipai Ethnographic Notes: A Baja California Indian Community at Mid Century. Menlo Park, CA: Ballena Press. ISBN 978-0-87919-144-3.
- Winter, Werner (1967). "The Identity of the Paipai (Akwa'ala)". In Hymes, Dell H.; Bittle, William E. (eds.). Studies in Southwestern Ethnolinguistics: Meaning and History in the Language of the American Southwest. The Hague, NL: Mouton Publishers. pp. 371–378. ISSN 0081-7953. OCLC 603484147.
