= Kosa'aay =

- Village
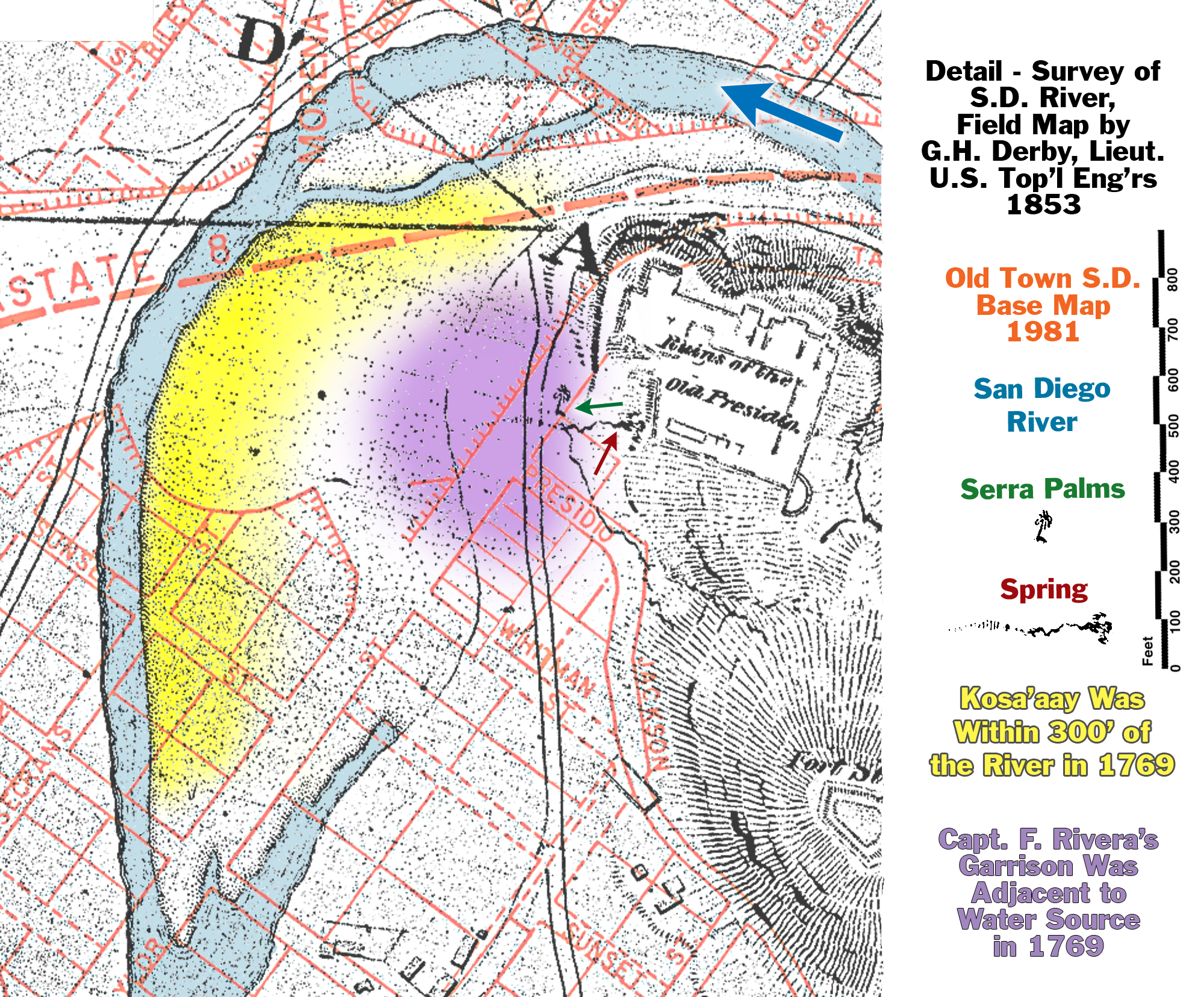
- Derby's map of 1853, current Old Town San Diego map, and significant historic 1769 sites. Village of Kosa'aay located at location "A".

- Location within San Diego Location within California Location within the United States
- Coordinates: 32°45′31.71″N 117°11′47.0″W
- Tribal Nation: Kumeyaay
- Established: Unknown
- Became San Diego, Alta California: July 16th, 1769

Kosa'aay was a Kumeyaay village in what is now Old Town, San Diego.

== Etymology ==
In the Kumeyaay language, Kosa’aay translates to “drying out place”. During Spanish settlement, the name was Hispanicized to Cosoy.

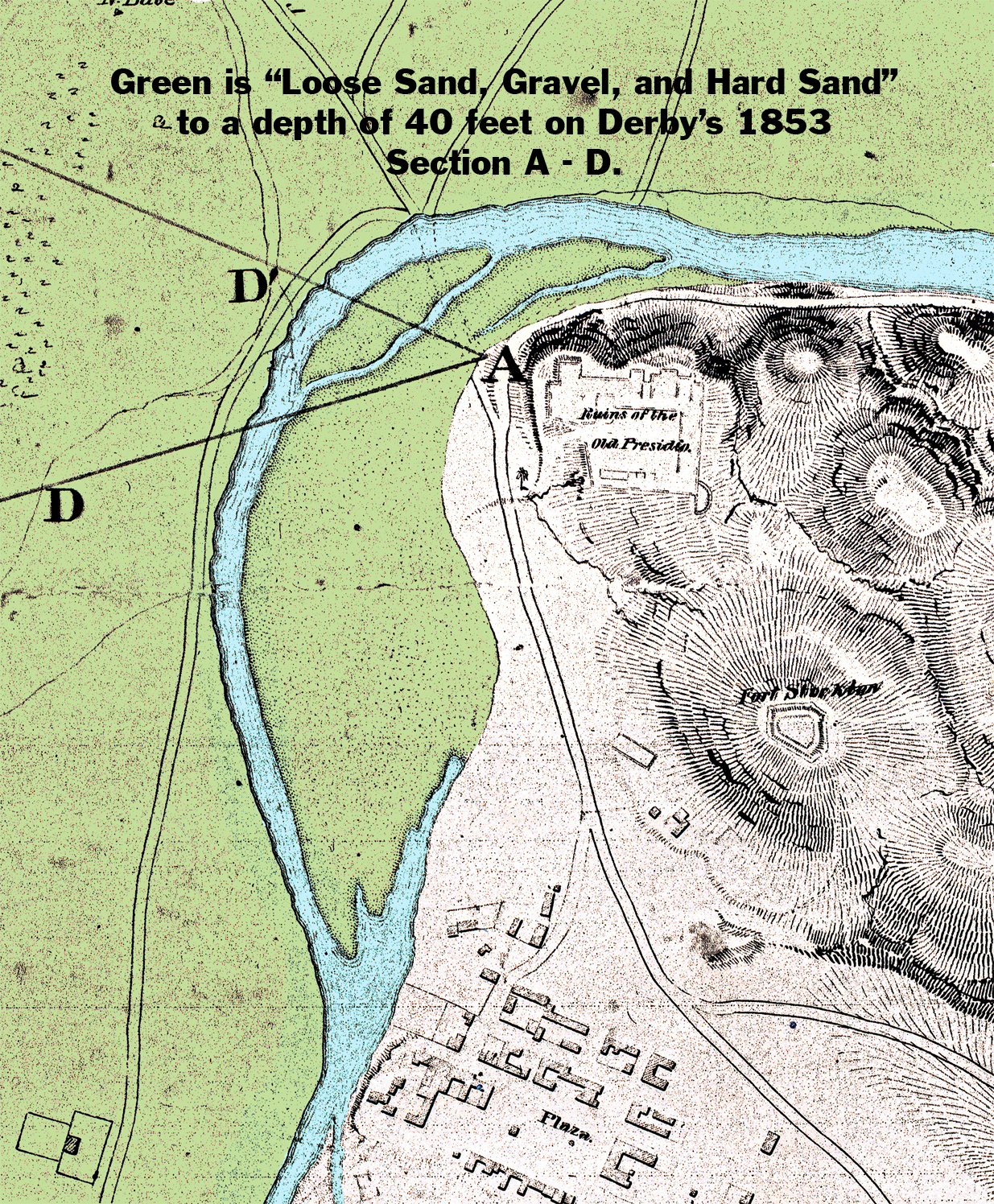
Village of Kosa'aay located at location "A" in 1853 map.

== Population ==
The village was made up of thirty to forty families.

== Settlement ==
The families in this settlement lived in pyramid-shaped housing structures that were supported by a freshwater spring, wetland vegetation and riparian vegetation along the hillsides.

The village provided food and water for the Portolá expedition in 1769 as the crew of the San Carlos and San Antonio were dying of scurvy and thirst. Lieut. Miguel Costansó described being guided by the Kumeyaay to the village as

"they arrived on the banks of a river hemmed in on either bank by a fringe of willows and cottonwoods, very leafy...within a musket-shot from the river they discovered a town or village of the same Indians who were guiding our men. It was composed of various huts of pyramidal shape made of branches and covered with earth....The village was composed of 30 or 40 families. On one side of it there was observed an enclosure made of boughs and trunks of trees. Within this, they explained, they took refuge against attacks from their enemies.”

The Spanish referred to the village as Cosoy, a hispanized name of Kosa'aay.

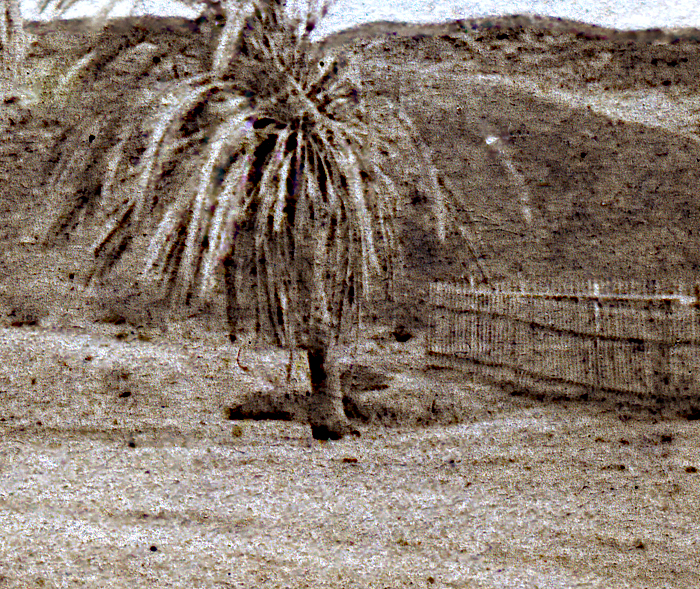
Freshwater spring location that supplied the village with fresh water.

== Spanish Interactions ==
On May 15, 1769, the Spanish erected a hospital camp on Presidio Hill and occupied the water source of the village as well as stationed a permanent garrison at the village upon the recovery of the members of the expedition party after the overland expedition party arrived at the village the day before.

== Founding of San Diego ==
On July 16, 1769, a Mass was held in the dedication of Mission San Diego de Acalá and El Presidio Real de San Diego, the first mission and presidio in Alta California, and the founding of the settlement of San Diego in Old Town, from which the Kumeyaay village of Kosa'aay was incorporated. The settlement of San Diego would later be called Tepacul Watai, meaning "Stacked Big" in Ipai Kumeyaay language, to refer to the City of San Diego.

== Old Town San Diego State Historic Park ==
The village is acknowledged through the Iipay Tipai Kumeyaay Mut Niihepok Park at Old Town San Diego State Historic Park, which was developed with the Kumeyaay Diegueño Land Conservancy (KDLC) to enhance visibility of Kumeyaay culture and history in the village's original site.

There is also a specialty shop in the state park called Kosay Kumeyaay Market, which sells cultural products from the Kumeyaay and other Yuman groups.
