= Cinon Duro Mataweer =

Native American leader and tribal shaman

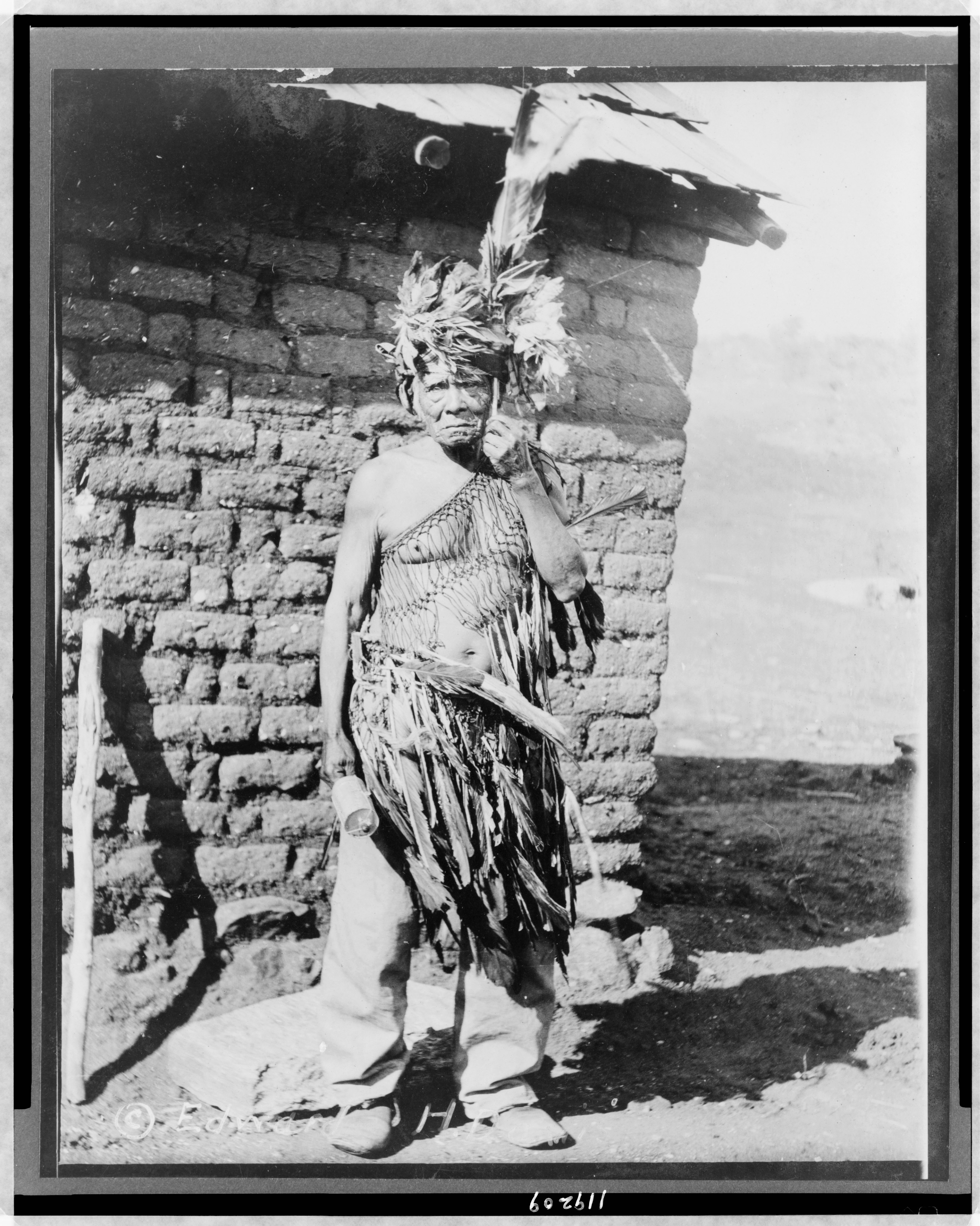
Cinon Mataweer in ceremonial plumes

Cinon Duro Mataweer (c. 1815-1910) was a 19th-century Native American leader and tribal shaman (kuseyaay). He is the great-great-grandfather of Anthony Pico, chairman of the Viejas Band of Kumeyaay. Mataweer was a member of the Ipai band, formerly known as the northern Diegueno, whose traditional territory is located near the US-Mexican border north of present-day San Diego.
