= Kumeyaay traditional narratives =

Kumeyaay traditional narratives include myths, legends, tales, and oral histories preserved by the Kumeyaay (Ipai, Tipai, Kamia, Diegueño) people of southern California and northwestern Baja California.

Kumeyaay oral literature is very similar to that of their Yuman relatives to the south and east, as well as to that of their Uto-Aztecan neighbors to the north. Particularly prominent are versions of the Southern California Creation Myth and of the long Flute Lure myth. (See also Traditional narratives of Indigenous Californians.)

== On-Line Examples of Kumeyaay Narratives ==
- "The Mythology of the Diegueños" by Constance Goddard DuBois (1901)
- "The Story of the Chaup" by Constance Goddard DuBois (1904) - See Tahquitz (spirit)
- "Mythology of the Mission Indians" by Constance Goddard DuBois (1906)
- "Ceremonies and Traditions of the Diegueño Indians" by Constance Goddard DuBois (1908)
- The North American Indian by Edward S. Curtis (1926)

== Sources for Kumeyaay Narratives ==
- Curtis, Edward S. 1907-1930. The North American Indian. 20 vols. Plimpton Press, Norwood, Massachusetts. (Ipai version of the creation myth collected from José Bastiano Lachapa, vol. 15, pp. 121–123.)
- DuBois, Constance Goddard. 1901. "The Mythology of the Diegueños". Journal of American Folklore 14:181-185. (Version of the Ipai creation myth from Cinon Duro of Mesa Grande.)
- DuBois, Constance Goddard. 1904. "The Story of the Chaup: A Myth of the Diegueños". Journal of American Folklore 17:217-242. (Ipai version of the Flute Lure myth from Antonio Duro of Mesa Grande.)
- DuBois, Constance Goddard. 1904. "Diegueño Mythology and Religion: The Story of Creation". Southern Workman 33:100-102. (Brief discussion.)
- DuBois, Constance Goddard. 1904. "Mission-Indian Religion: A Myth in the Making". Southern Workman 33:353-356. (Accounts of a "footprint" in rock.)
- DuBois, Constance Goddard. 1905. "The Mythology of the Diegueños: Mission Indians of San Diego County, California, as Proving Their Status to be Higher than is Generally Believed". International Congress of Americanists, 13th session, pp. 101–106. (Condensation of DuBois' 1904 Flute Lure myth.)
- DuBois, Constance Goddard. 1905b. "Religious Ceremonies and Myths of the Mission Indians". American Anthropologist 7:620-629. (Portion of the Manzanita creation myth.)
- DuBois, Constance Goddard. 1906. "Mythology of the Mission Indians". Journal of American Folklore 19:145-164. (Manzanita versions of the Flute Lure myth.)
- DuBois, Constance Goddard. 1907. "Diegueño Myths and Their Connection with the Mohave". International Congress of Americanists, 15th session, vol. 2, pp. 129–133. (Comments on Kumeyaay creation myth.)
- DuBois, Constance Goddard. 1908. "Ceremonies and Traditions of the Diegueño Indians". Journal of American Folklore 21:228-236. (Brief notes on creation myth.)
- Erdoes, Richard, and Alfonso Ortiz. 1984. American Indian Myths and Legends. Pantheon Books, New York. (Retelling of a narrative from DuBois 1901, pp. 156–157.)
- Gifford, Edward Winslow. 1918. "Clans and Moieties in Southern California". University of California Publications in American Archaeology and Ethnology 14:155-219. Berkeley. (Version of the creation myth from James McCarty in 1916-1917, pp. 170–172.)
- Gifford, Edward Winslow. 1931. The Kamia of Imperial Valley. Bureau of American Ethnology Bulletin No. 97. Washington, D.C. (Myths recorded in 1928-1929.)
- Gifford, Edward Winslow, and Gwendoline Harris Block. 1930. California Indian Nights. Arthur H. Clark, Glendale, California. (Previously published Creation myth version, pp. 105–107.)
- Hinton, Leanne, and Lucille J. Watahomigie. 1984. Spirit Mountain: An Anthology of Yuman Story and Song. University of Arizona Press, Tucson. (Includes two traditional Ipai narratives, pp. 233–245.)
- Laylander, Don. 2004. Listening to the Raven: The Southern California Ethnography of Constance Goddard DuBois. Coyote Press Archives of California Prehistory No. 51. Salinas, California. (Includes editions of all DuBois' Kumeyaay articles, plus some unpublished material in footnotes.)
- Lee, Melicent. 1933. Indians of the Oaks. Ginn and Company, Boston. (Children's story incorporating some traditional narratives.)
- Meigs, Peveril, III. 1971. "Creation Myth and Other Recollections of the Nijí Mishkwish". Pacific Coast Archaeological Society Quarterly 7(1):9-13. (Brief version of the creation myth narrated by Calistra Tenjil in 1929, p. 12.)
- Spier, Leslie. 1923. "Southern Diegueño Customs". University of California Publications in American Archaeology and Ethnology 20:294-358. Berkeley. (Myths collected from Jim McCarty in 1920, pp. 328–334.)
- Waterman, T. T. 1910. "The Religious Practices of the Diegueño Indians". University of California Publications in American Archaeology and Ethnology 8:271-358. Berkeley. (Campo version of the creation myth, with a discussion, pp. 338–343.)

== See also ==
- Kumeyaay astronomy
