= Viejas Valley, California =

Valley in San Diego County, California

Viejas Valley is a valley in eastern San Diego County, California, United States.

== Geography ==
It has its head at an elevation of 3,880 feet (1,180 m) on the north slope of Chiquito Peak in the Cuyamaca Mountains, at 32°51′20″N 116°38′30″W.

Its mouth is at an elevation of 2,224 feet (678 m).

== See also ==
- Cuyamaca Mountains—related topics
- Viejas Group of Capitan Grande Band of Mission Indians
