= Kumeyaay–Mexican War =

Armed conflict in the Californias, 1836–1846

| Date | 1836–1846 |
| Location | San Diego region, Alta California, and La Frontera, northern Baja California |
| Result | See § Aftermath: Most ranchos around San Diego abandoned; Mission Guadalupe del Norte abandoned; Conflict ended by the American occupation of Alta California |

Belligerents
| Kumeyaay bands: Jacumé; Kamia/Desert Kumiai; Nejí (1839–1840); Colorado River groups under Charague; Supported by: Quechan | Centralist Republic of Mexico: Californio militia; Frontier garrison of Baja California; Allied Kumeyaay: San Pasqual pueblo (1835–1846); Secua rancheria; Nejí (until 1839) |

Commanders and leaders
| Claudio (POW); Pedro Pablo (executed); Cartucho (executed); Martín; Charague; Jatñil (1839–1840) | Agustín V. Zamorano; Pablo de la Portilla; Macedonio González; Antonio Garraleta; Estanislao Armenta; Narciso Franco; Jatñil (until 1839) |

The Kumeyaay–Mexican War was a series of armed conflicts from 1836 to 1846 between Kumeyaay bands and Mexico in the San Diego region of Alta California and in La Frontera, the frontier district of northern Baja California. Kumeyaay raiders attacked ranchos and missions on both sides of the present-day Mexico–United States border, including Rancho Tecate, Rancho Jamul, Rancho Tijuana, and Mission Guadalupe del Norte, and twice moved against the town of San Diego.

The fighting began during the political crisis that followed Mexico's adoption of a centralist constitution in 1836, which divided the Californio leadership and left the San Diego garrison without pay or supplies. Kumeyaay communities fought on both sides. Residents of the pueblo of San Pasqual, founded by former residents of Mission San Diego de Alcalá, fought against raiders in Alta California. On the frontier, the Kumiai leader Jatñil of Nejí supported Mexican forces until 1839, when he attacked Mission Guadalupe after he was baptized by force.

By the early 1840s many ranchos around San Diego had been abandoned, and Mission Guadalupe had been abandoned after Jatñil's attack. The conflict ended with the American occupation of Alta California during the Mexican–American War in 1846.

== Background ==
=== Spanish rule ===
Spain began colonizing Kumeyaay territory in 1769 with the founding of the Presidio of San Diego and Mission San Diego de Alcalá. On the night of November 4–5, 1775, warriors from at least fifteen villages attacked and burned the mission. Dominican missionaries later founded missions among the Kumeyaay of northern Baja California. The founding of Mission San Miguel Arcángel de la Frontera in 1787 ended a period of Kumiai resistance in that region.

=== Early Mexican period ===
Mexico took control of the Californias after independence in 1821. On the frontier, raids on ranches and missions increased from 1823 to 1825 and were followed by Mexican reprisals. Mexico also tried to reopen the overland route from Sonora, which had been closed since the Quechan revolt of 1781. Lieutenant José Antonio Romualdo Pacheco built a fort at Laguna Chapala in 1825–1826 to protect travelers. On April 26, 1826, Kumeyaay warriors from San Sebastián attacked Fort Romualdo Pacheco and killed three soldiers. After Kumeyaay and Quechan warriors surrounded the post, Pacheco abandoned it and withdrew to San Diego. In the same year, Mexican forces attacked Kumeyaay in the San Felipe Valley and at Santa Ysabel. The Quechan continued to control the overland route between San Diego and Sonora.

Mexico secularized the missions in 1833. Within two years, eighteen ranchos had been formed from mission lands in the San Diego and San Luis Rey mission districts. Some former mission Indians were settled in new Indian pueblos; San Pasqual was established on November 16, 1835, with 81 people from Mission San Diego. Others moved inland to areas held by unmissionized Kumeyaay and brought knowledge of the ranchos' defenses and their tactical strengths and weaknesses, which was later used in raids. On the frontier, Félix Caballero founded Mission Guadalupe del Norte in June 1834 with help from Jatñil, a Kumiai leader from Nejí who had supported the soldiers and missionaries since 1822.

=== Political context ===
In 1835 the First Mexican Republic was replaced by a centralist government. Under constitutional laws dated December 29, 1836, California became a department instead of a territory. Governor Mariano Chico announced the centralist constitution in May 1836. Californios opposed his rule, and in November 1836 Juan Bautista Alvarado led a revolt at Monterey that sought to restore federalism. San Diego's council refused to recognize Alvarado in March 1837, and Alvarado ordered the removal of the town's guns and horses.

The San Diego garrison was poorly paid and equipped, and troops at San Diego and San Luis Rey refused to fight without back pay. A militia from Los Angeles seized the town's cannon in 1837. Because of its small population, San Diego lost its status as a pueblo on January 1, 1838, and was placed under the prefecture of Los Angeles.

== Course of the war ==
=== 1836 ===
Raids increased in 1835 and 1836. In the spring of 1836, raiders attacked Pedro Marrón's Rancho Cuero de Venado and a mission creamery in El Cajon Valley, where three Indian workers were killed. The alcalde of San Diego, Santiago Argüello, sent Captain Pablo de la Portilla and his soldiers against a force gathering in the mountains.

In July 1836, Kumeyaay from Jacumé, led by Pedro Pablo, Martín, and Cartucho and allied with desert Kumiai and Colorado River groups under Charague, attacked Antonio Coronel's rancho at Otay and devastated Juan Bandini's Rancho Tecate. Bandini reported that he was left with two mules and two horses. In the same year, about 400 Yuma warriors attacked Mission Guadalupe, which was held by its garrison.

=== 1837 ===
In February 1837, Jacumé fighters attacked the Argüello rancho and ambushed Sergeant Macedonio González at Tecate. Jatñil rescued about 25 soldiers who were trapped in a canyon.

In April 1837, a band from the Jacumba area attacked Pío Pico's Rancho Jamul. The raiders killed the mayordomo, Juan Leiva, and his servants and burned the ranch. Leiva's wife and son were stripped and left behind, and his daughters Tomasa and Ramona were taken captive. Pico's mother and sisters fled to nearby Rancho Jamacha, where people from the Secua rancheria were called in to defend it. González led a search into the mountains, including the Cuyamaca area, but the daughters were never recovered.

Alvarado later identified Claudio, a non-Christian leader, as the leader of the Jamul raid. Claudio had earlier raided a Mission San Diego rancho, killing two white settlers and several Christian Indians. Men from San Pasqual attacked Claudio's group, killed nine of its warriors, and captured Claudio, who was handed over to Mexican authorities.

In the spring of 1837, residents of San Diego uncovered a plan by Indian servants in the town to rob the Fitch store, kill its clerk, and kidnap two Californio women. Felipa Osuna is credited with learning of the plan through her knowledge of the local Indian language. Soldiers pursued and executed the plotters, including a cook in the Estudillo household. Captured Indians reportedly said that Alvarado's northern faction had incited them. Because the military command was disorganized, Agustín V. Zamorano and other San Diego residents organized the effort to suppress the raids.

In June 1837, a Kumeyaay force planned a night attack on San Diego. About 25 people defended the town, including ten sailors from the hide ship Alert, and the attackers withdrew after the ship fired its guns. On July 6, 1837, raiders struck the mission's Rancho San Bernardo and killed a corporal, a soldier, and a shepherd. Between 1837 and 1838, Pedro Pablo and Cartucho were executed at Guadalupe under Sergeant Narciso Franco.

=== 1838–1840 ===
Raids continued through 1839, and few ranchos in the San Diego district escaped them. José Antonio Pico reported that no soldiers or ammunition were available. In 1839, Kumeyaay warriors attacked and burned Rancho Tijuana.

On the frontier, Jatñil was captured at Rosarito, taken to Mission San Miguel, baptized by force, and flogged. He escaped, was recaptured near La Zorra, and was flogged again. Jatñil later said that Caballero's forced baptisms of his people led to his attack on Mission Guadalupe. His men killed a corporal and two catechumens. Caballero survived after María Gracia, an Indian woman, hid him. Accounts date the attack to October 1839 or February 1840. The mission was abandoned in 1840, and Caballero died at Mission San Ignacio later that year.

Farther south, the missions of San Miguel and Santa Catalina were destroyed in 1839. At Santa Catalina, the mission was burned in October 1839 and sixteen neophytes were killed. Indigenous accounts attribute the attack to an alliance of Kumiai, Koal, Cucapá, Paipai, and Kolew. Other documents describe it as retaliation by the people of La Huerta after neophytes killed a Koal man.

=== 1841–1846 ===
In June 1842 the Kumeyaay again attacked San Diego, and the town held. Raids forced the Californios to abandon their ranchos several times, and by 1846 the white population of the San Diego district had fallen by more than half, from 520 to 248. About 2,500 Christian Indians lived in the district at that time. By 1844 most ranchos near Kumeyaay territory had been abandoned or could not operate.

== Aftermath ==
American forces occupied San Diego on July 29, 1846, during the Mexican–American War. During the Battle of San Pasqual in December 1846, the residents of San Pasqual withdrew to the hills. According to Felicita, the daughter of the pueblo's captain José Pedro Panto, Panto warned the Californio commander that his men would help the Americans if the fighting continued that night. In 1847 Panto lent oxen and horses to Commodore Robert F. Stockton for the march on Los Angeles.

Conflict between Kumeyaay bands and the new American authorities resumed in 1851 during the revolt led by Antonio Garra and the Yuma War. In Baja California, Indigenous communities fought alongside Mexican settlers during William Walker's invasion of 1853–1854. Antonio María Meléndrez reportedly recruited about 300 men from Santa Catarina, La Huerta, and the Cucapá to recover cattle taken by Walker's men, and Indigenous groups in the sierra and along the lower Colorado River took livestock from Walker's force as it withdrew toward Sonora. Jatñil continued to assist Mexican authorities until at least 1870.

== Historiography ==
Mid-20th-century histories of San Diego described the fighting as "Indian troubles" and uprisings. David Zárate Loperena's 1993 study of Jatñil, which drew on testimony from members of the Mishkwish lineage, described him as a hero to the Kumiai.

== See also ==
- Apache–Mexico Wars
- Comanche–Mexico Wars
- Revolts against the Centralist Republic of Mexico
- Yuma War
