= Viejas Group of Capitan Grande Band of Mission Indians =

Indian tribe in California, United States

Viejas Band of Kumeyaay Indians
- Tribal Flag

Total population
- 394

Regions with significant populations
- United States (California)

Languages
- Ipai, Tipai, English, Spanish

Religion
- Traditional tribal religion, Christianity (Roman Catholicism)

Related ethnic groups
- other Kumeyaay tribes, Cocopa, Quechan, Paipai, and Kiliwa

The Viejas Band of Kumeyaay Indians, also called the Viejas (Baron Long) Group of Capitan Grande Band of Mission Indians of the Viejas Reservation, is a federally recognized tribe of Kumeyaay people.

== Reservations ==
Location of Viejas Reservation

In 1875, the Viejas Band shared the Capitan Grande Reservation along with the Barona Group of Capitan Grande Band of Mission Indians, which consisted of lands in and around the present day El Capitan Reservoir. El Capitan Reservoir, forcibly purchased from the two tribes to provide water for San Diego, submerged what habitable land existed on the reservation. The two tribes jointly control this reservation. It is undeveloped but serves as an ecological preserve.

The Viejas Reservation (Kumiai: Metaar 'Ewaa; 32°51′01″N 116°41′33″W), also known as the Baron Long Reservation, is a federal Indian reservation located in San Diego County, California, in the Cuyamaca Mountains near Alpine. After the band was displaced from Capitan Grande, this new reservation was created by executive order in 1934. The reservation is about 1,609 acres (6.51 km^{2}) large. Approximately 289 of the 394 enrolled members live on the reservation.

The reservation is home to scrub oaks and chaparral. The name "Viejas" comes from the Spanish name for their land, "El Valle de Las Viejas" or "The Valley of the Old Women." In 1973, 121 of the 127 enrolled members lived on the reservation.

=== Demographics ===
Viejas Reservation, California – Racial and ethnic composition Note: the US Census treats Hispanic/Latino as an ethnic category. This table excludes Latinos from the racial categories and assigns them to a separate category. Hispanics/Latinos may be of any race.
Race / Ethnicity (NH = Non-Hispanic)	Pop 2000	Pop 2010	Pop 2020	% 2000	% 2010	% 2020
White alone (NH)	195	114	95	49.49%	21.92%	17.66%
Black or African American alone (NH)	0	4	3	0.00%	0.77%	0.56%
Native American or Alaska Native alone (NH)	135	253	306	34.26%	48.65%	56.88%
Asian alone (NH)	7	3	10	1.78%	0.58%	1.86%
Native Hawaiian or Pacific Islander alone (NH)	0	1	0	0.00%	0.19%	0.00%
Other race alone (NH)	6	0	0	1.52%	0.00%	0.00%
Mixed race or Multiracial (NH)	12	35	43	3.05%	6.73%	7.99%
Hispanic or Latino (any race)	39	110	81	9.90%	21.15%	15.06%
Total	394	520	538	100.00%	100.00%	100.00%

== Government ==
The Viejas Band is headquartered in Alpine, California. They are governed by a democratically elected, seven-person tribal council, who serve two-year terms. Their current administration as of March 2021 is as follows:

- Chairman: John Christman
- Vice Chairman: Victor E. Woods
- Secretary: Rene Curo
- Treasurer: Samuel Q. Brown
- Councilmember: Adrian M. Brown
- Councilmember: Gabriel T. TeSam, Jr.
- Councilmember: Kevin M. Carrizosa

== Economic development ==
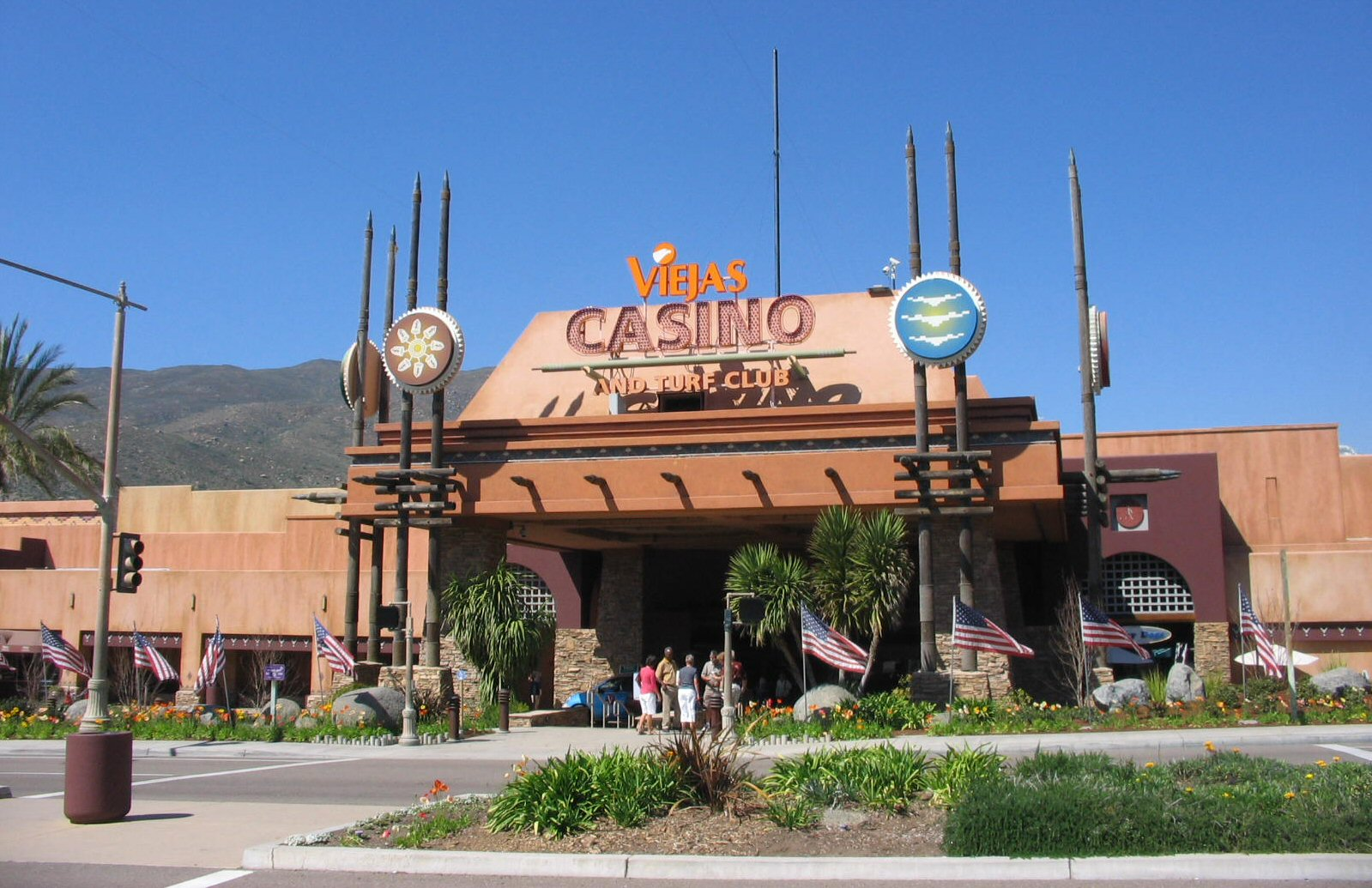
Viejas Casino, Alpine, California

The tribe owns and operates Viejas Casino, Grove Steakhouse, Far East Winds, Mezz Deli, Daisy's Cafe, Harvest Buffet, V Lounge, DreamCatcher Lounge, and the 57-store Viejas Outlet Center. They also own the first Native American bank in California, Borrego Springs Bank, N.A., with branches in Alpine, Borrego Springs, and La Mesa. They own two recreational vehicle parks. Viejas Entertainment hosts concerts in a 1,500-seat outdoor arena and also promotes talent to casinos throughout the country.

The tribe owns 50 percent of the Broadcast Company of the Americas, which operates a sports talk station, The Mighty 1090-AM in San Diego.

Viejas partnered with the Forest County Potawatomi Community of Wisconsin, the Oneida Tribe of Indians of Wisconsin, and the San Manuel Band of Mission Indians of California to create Four Fires, LLC, an economic development group. A similar project, Three Fires, LCC is shared between Viejas, and the Oneida Tribe of Indians of Wisconsin and the San Manuel Band of Mission Indians.

The tribe paid San Diego State University $6 million for naming rights to Viejas Arena.

== Events ==
Two major annual ceremonies on the reservation are the "Clearing of the Cemetery," when tribal members clean and pay their respects at the two tribal cemeteries, and Dia de las Animas or All Souls' Day.

== See also ==
- Viejas Valley, California
- Cuyamaca Mountains
- Tommy Pico, Kumeyaay poet

== Bibliography ==
- Eargle, Jr., Dolan H. Northern California Guide: Weaving the Past and Present. San Francisco: Tree Company Press, 2000. ISBN 0-937401-10-2.
- Pritzker, Barry M. A Native American Encyclopedia: History, Culture, and Peoples. Oxford: Oxford University Press, 2000. ISBN 978-0-19-513877-1.
- Shipek, Florence C. "History of Southern California Mission Indians." Handbook of North American Indians. Volume ed. Heizer, Robert F. Washington, DC: Smithsonian Institution, 1978. 610–618. ISBN 0-87474-187-4.
