= Ewiiaapaayp Band of Kumeyaay Indians =

Native Kumeyaay Indians in Southern California

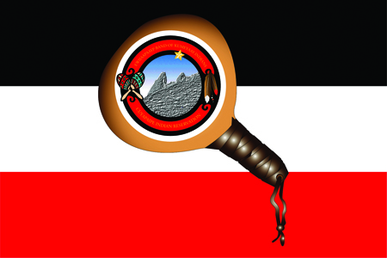
- Flag of the Ewiiaapaayp Band

Total population
- 7 (2004); 16 (1990)

Regions with significant populations
- United States (California)

Languages
- Kumeyaay, English

Religion
- Traditional tribal religion, Christianity (Roman Catholicism)

Related ethnic groups
- other Kumeyaay tribes, Cocopa, Quechan, Paipai, and Kiliwa

The Ewiiaapaayp Band of Kumeyaay Indians, formerly known as the Cuyapaipe Community of Diegueño Mission Indians of the Cuyapaipe Reservation, is a federally recognized tribe of Kumeyaay Indians, who are sometimes known as Mission Indians, located in San Diego County, California. "Ewiiaapaayp" is Kumeyaay for "leaning rock," a prominent feature on the reservation.

== Reservation ==
Location of Ewiiaapaayp Indian Reservation

The Ewiiaapaayp Indian Reservation, formerly known as the Cuyapaipe Reservation (32°50′30″N 116°23′08″W), is a federal Indian reservation located in the Laguna Mountains of southern East County, San Diego. The reservation was created in 1891 by the US Congress.

Two parcels of land form the reservation. The main Ewiiaapaayp Reservation is 4,102.5 acres (16.602 km^{2}) large, located near Mount Laguna, and 19 miles (31 km) east of Alpine. Only 1% of this arable, with the majority being steep and rocky. No public utilities are available on this parcel. Because of the inaccessibility to this reservation, many Ewiiaapaayp families moved and enrolled in other Kumeyaay tribes.

The second parcel, known as the Little Ewiiaapaayp Indian Reservation, is 10 acres (40,000 m^{2}) of land located within Alpine, which was put into trust in 1986. That land is leased to the Southern Indian Health Council, which provides health care for seven Kumeyaay tribes as well as non-Natives living in the area.

In recent years, 13 people lived on seven houses on the reservation and bred horses. The only access to the reservation is on foot, since it is serviced by a dirt road, gated in several locations. In 1973, two of the five enrolled citizens lived on the reservation.

== Demographics ==
=== 2020 census ===
Ewiiaapaayp Reservation, California – Racial and ethnic composition Note: the US Census treats Hispanic/Latino as an ethnic category. This table excludes Latinos from the racial categories and assigns them to a separate category. Hispanics/Latinos may be of any race.
Race / Ethnicity (NH = Non-Hispanic)	Pop 2000	Pop 2010	Pop 2020	% 2000	% 2010	% 2020
White alone (NH)	0	0	1	0.00%	0.00%	20.00%
Black or African American alone (NH)	0	0	0	0.00%	0.00%	0.00%
Native American or Alaska Native alone (NH)	0	0	1	0.00%	0.00%	20.00%
Asian alone (NH)	0	0	0	0.00%	0.00%	0.00%
Native Hawaiian or Pacific Islander alone (NH)	0	0	0	0.00%	0.00%	0.00%
Other race alone (NH)	0	0	0	0.00%	0.00%	0.00%
Mixed race or Multiracial (NH)	0	0	1	0.00%	0.00%	20.00%
Hispanic or Latino (any race)	0	0	2	0.00%	0.00%	40.00%
Total	0	0	5	100.00%	100.00%	100.00%

== Government ==
The Ewiiaapaayp Band is headquartered in Alpine, California. They are governed by a democratically elected tribal council, according to their constitution, ratified in 1973 and amended in 2002. They are a self-governance tribe, as outlined in the Indian Self-Determination and Education Assistance Act. Robert Pinto is their current tribal chairperson.

== Tribal citizens ==
Enrolled citizens include Michael Garcia; Harlan Pinto, Jr.; Harlan Pinto, Sr.; Gloria Pinto; Robert Pinto, Sr.; Robert Pinto Jr.; and James Robertson.

== Economic development ==
In 2006, the tribe formed Leaning Rock Water, a company providing bottled drinking water.

== Education ==
The reservation's small exclave that is completely surrounded by the Alpine, California CDP is served by the Alpine Union Elementary School District and Grossmont Union High School District, while the rest of the reservation is served by the Mountain Empire Unified School District.

== Activities ==
The reservation hosts an annual three-day celebration, the Ewiiaapaayp Gathering, at Thing Valley ranch during the last week of July. Gates are opened, and the public is welcome. The gathering features birdsongs, basket weaving, acorn processing and other cultural demonstrations, camping, peon games, and a barbecue.

== See also ==
- Mountain Empire, San Diego
- Native American tribes in San Diego County, California

== Bibliography ==
- Eargle, Jr., Dolan H. Northern California Guide: Weaving the Past and Present. San Francisco: Tree Company Press, 2000. ISBN 0-937401-10-2.
- Pritzker, Barry M. A Native American Encyclopedia: History, Culture, and Peoples. Oxford: Oxford University Press, 2000. ISBN 978-0-19-513877-1.
- Shipek, Florence C. "History of Southern California Mission Indians." Handbook of North American Indians. Volume ed. Heizer, Robert F. Washington, DC: Smithsonian Institution, 1978. 610-618. ISBN 0-87474-187-4.
