= Kumeyaay =

Indigenous people of Mexico and California, US

Total population
- As of 1990, 1,200 on reservations; 2,000 off-reservation

Regions with significant populations
- Mexico (Baja California); United States (California)

Languages
- Ipai, Kumeyaay, Tipai, English, and Spanish

Related ethnic groups
- Luiseño, Cocopa, Quechan, Paipai and Kiliwa

Michael Connolly, from San Diego, pronounces Kumeyaay

The Kumeyaay, also known as 'Iipai-Tiipai or by the historical Spanish name Diegueño, is a tribe of Indigenous people who live at the northern border of Baja California in Mexico and the southern border of California in the United States. They are an Indigenous people of California.

The Kumeyaay language belongs to the Yuman–Cochimí language family. The Kumeyaay consist of three related groups, the 'Iipai, Tiipai, and Kamia. The San Diego River loosely divided the 'Iipay and the Tiipai historical homelands, while the Kamia lived in the eastern desert areas.

The 'Iipai lived to the north, from Escondido to Lake Henshaw, while the Tiipai lived to the south, in lands including the Laguna Mountains, Ensenada, and Tecate. The Kamia lived to the east in an area that included Mexicali and bordered the Salton Sea. Typical of Californian coastal people, the pre-contact Kumeyaay diet was rich in maritime protein and they had a relatively high population density compared to interior North American tribes.

== Name ==
The Kumeyaay or 'Iipai-Tiipai were formerly known as the Diegueños, the former Spanish name applied to the Mission Indians living along the San Diego River. They are referred to as Kumiai in Mexico. The term Kumeyaay translates as "People of the west", with the word meyaay meaning "steep" or "cliff".

== Language ==
All languages and dialects spoken by the Kumeyaay belong to the Delta–California branch of the Yuman language family, to which several other linguistically distinct, but related, groups also belong (including the Cocopa, Quechan, Paipai, and Kiliwa). Native speakers contend that, within their territory, all Kumeyaay ('Iipay/Tiipay) can understand and speak to each other, if even after a brief familiarization.

Nomenclature and tribal distinctions are not widely agreed upon. According to Margaret Langdon, who is credited with doing much of the early work on documenting the language, the general scholarly consensus recognized three separate dialects:

- 'Iipai (Northern Digueño)
- Kumeyaay proper (Kamia)
- Tiipay (Southern Digueño) in northern Baja California

Katherine Luomala considered that the wide range of dialect variations reflected only two distinct languages, 'Iipai and Tiipai, a view mostly supported by other researchers.

Kumeyaay (Ipai–Tipai / Kumiai) is traditionally transmitted through oral narratives, song cycles, and ceremonial practices. Bird songs, which recount migratory journeys and ancestral histories, remain one of the most culturally significant forms of verbal art among Kumeyaay communities. Although the number of first-language speakers has declined, linguistic elements continue to appear in song traditions and storytelling, and community-based language classes and revitalization programs operate on several Kumeyaay reservations and at Kumeyaay Community College.

Language preservation efforts are active on both sides of the U.S.–Mexico border. Community-based initiatives such as Kumeyaay Community College (Sycuan), university collaborations, and programs within individual reservations support adult classes, documentation, and curriculum development. Archival and museum collections relevant to Kumeyaay language, history, and oral traditions are held at regional institutions such as the Museum of Us and tribal museums including the Barona Cultural Center & Museum.

== History ==
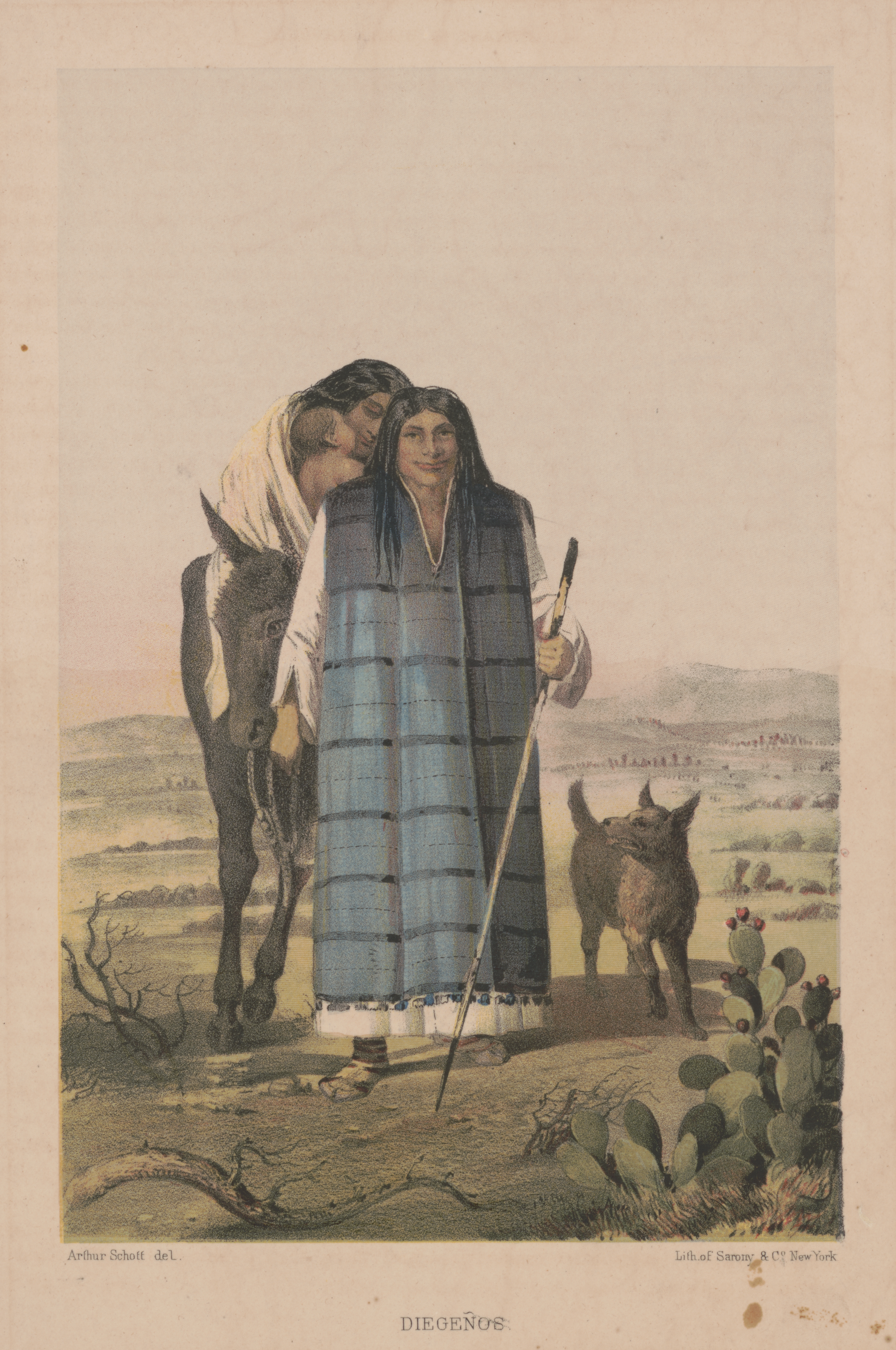
Engraving by Arthur Carl Victor Schott, Sorony & Co., 1857

=== Pre-European contact ===
Evidence of the settlement in what is today considered Kumeyaay territory may go back twelve millennia. Circa 7000 B.C. marked the emergence of two cultural traditions: the California Coast and Valley tradition and the Desert tradition. The Kumeyaay had land along the Pacific Ocean from present Oceanside, California, in the north to south of Ensenada, Mexico, and extending east to the Colorado River. The Cuyamaca complex, a late Holocene complex in San Diego County is related to the Kumeyaay peoples.

One view holds that historic 'Iipai-Tiipai emerged around one millennium ago, though a "proto-'Iipai-Tiipai culture" had been established by about 5000 B.C. Another view suggests that the "nucleus of later Tipai-Ipai groups" came together around A.D. 1000. The Kumeyaay themselves traditionally hold that they have lived in San Diego since 10,000 B.C. At the time of European contact, Kumeyaay comprised several autonomous bands with thirty patrilineal clans.

=== Spanish exploration and colonization ===
The first European to visit the region was Juan Rodríguez Cabrillo in 1542. He had initially met with the Kumeyaay, but this did not lead to any colonial settlement. Sebastián Vizcaíno also visited in 1602 and met with a band of Kumeyaay during the feast of San Diego de Alcalá, thus giving the region of San Diego its name; however, this also did not lead to colonial settlement.

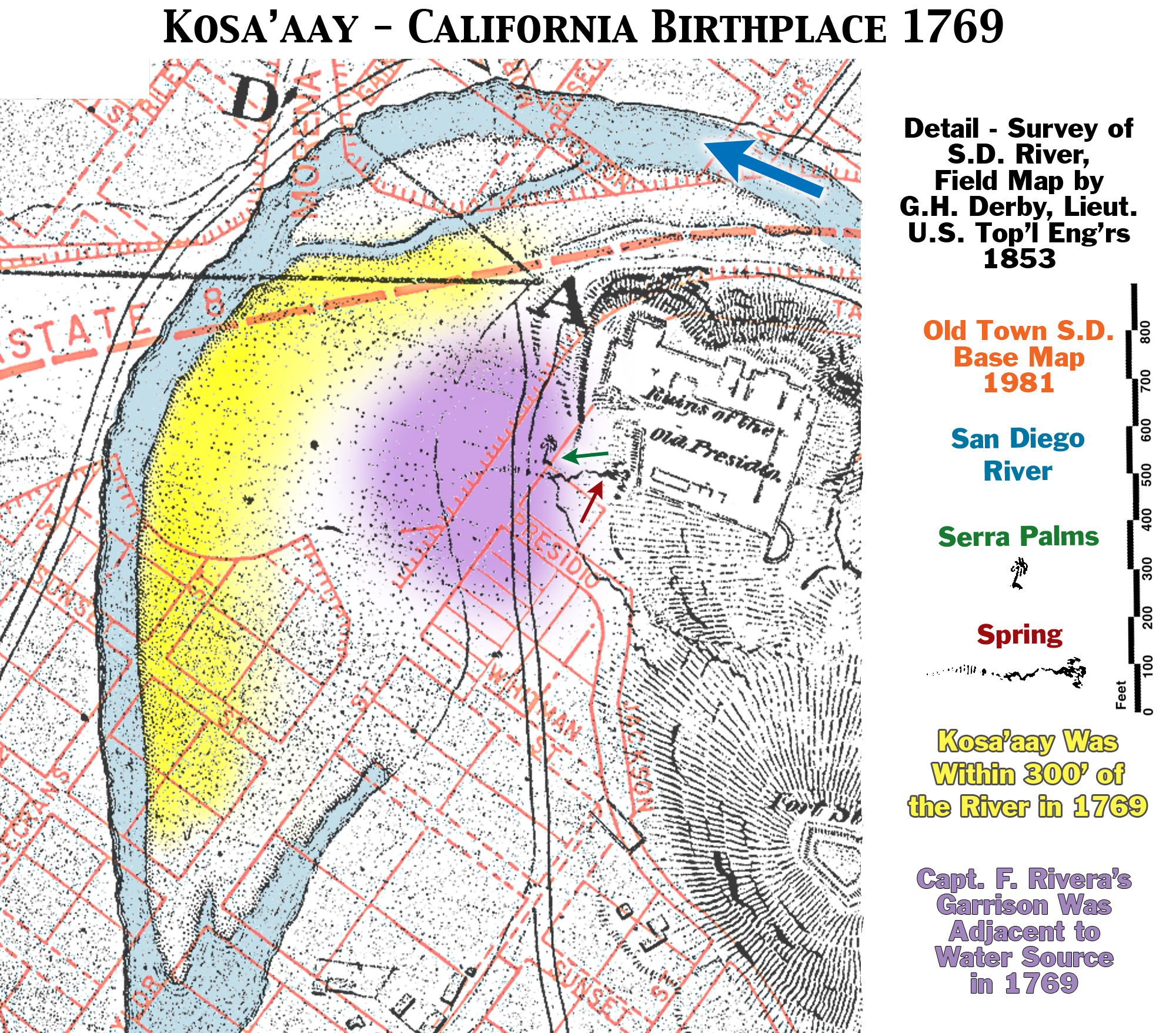
Location of the Kumeyaay village of Kosa'aay in yellow.

==== Missionization period ====
In 1769, the Portolá expedition anchored in San Diego Bay and, once on land, traveled to the Kumeyaay village of Cosoy (Kosa'aay) to recover and resupply. After their recovery, the Spanish established a presidio over the village and the Misión San Diego de Alcalá, incorporating the village into the settlement of San Diego. In 1769, under the Spanish Mission system, bands living near Misión San Diego de Alcalá (overlooking the San Diego River, in present-day Mission Valley), were called Diegueños; later bands, living near Mission San Luis Rey de Francia, were called the Luiseño. The Spaniards brought with them new, non-native, invasive flora and domestic animals, which brought about some level of degradation to local ecology. This included grazing and foraging livestock animals such as pigs, goats, sheep, cattle, horses, donkeys, and various birds, like chickens, pheasants and ducks; the latter dirtying local water sources considerably.

After years of sexual assaults from the Spanish soldiers in the Presidio, and physical torture of Mission Indians using metal-tipped whips (by Mission staff), the Tiipay-Kumeyaay villages led a revolt against the Spanish, burning down Mission San Diego and killing Father Luis Jayme along with two others. Missionaries and church leaders “apologized” and forgave the Kumeyaay, rebuilding their mission closer to the Kumeyaay village of Nipaquay or Nipawai. Ultimately, the Spanish solidified their control over the area until the end of the mission era.

==== Colorado River conflict ====
In the east, the Kamia-Kumeyaay were engaged in an armed regional conflict in the Colorado River region against a coalition of Yuman speaking tribes east of the Colorado River and the Cahuilla led by the Maricopa. The Kumeyaay aligned with Quechan-led coalition, along with the Mohave, Yavapai, Chemehuevi, and other smaller groups on the Colorado River. The Spanish mediated peace talks between the two warring factions in the mid-1770s, largely siding with the Quechan-aligned alliance. However, increased tensions between the Spanish and the Quechan led to resumed conflict in 1781, but with the Spanish being denied overland access to Alta California and siding with the Maricopa-aligned coalition. The Spanish would then refocus their attention westwards to secure their maritime access to Alta California on 'Iipay-Tiipay-Kumeyaay lands.

=== Early Mexican rancho era ===
==== First Mexican Empire and First Mexican Republic period ====
The Mexican Empire assumed ownership of Kumeyaay lands after defeating Spain in the Mexican War of Independence in 1821. The following year, Mexican troops confiscated all coastal lands from the Kumeyaay in 1822, granting much of the land to Mexican settlers, who became known as Californios, to develop the land for agriculture, beginning the California rancho era.

Kumeyaay fell victim to smallpox and malaria epidemics in 1827 and 1832, reducing their population.

Various disputes culminated to a skirmish between the Kumeyaay and Mexican soldiers stationed in San Diego in 1826, killing 26 Kumeyaay. This provoked Lt. Juan M. Ibarra to lead several attacks on Kumeyaay-controlled lands, and killed 28 people in his attack on Santa Ysabel on April 5 of that year. In retaliation, the Kamia-Kumeyaay attacked Fort Romualdo Pacheco on April 26 with the support of the Quechan, resulting in three dead Mexican soldiers and a fort that would never return to service.

After decades of debates and delays, the missions in Alta California were secularized in 1833, and Ipai and Tipais lost their lands; band members had to choose between becoming serfs, trespassers, rebels, or fugitives. This increased tensions between the Kumeyaay and the Mexican settlers as the economic instability threatened the security of Mexican and American merchants transiting through the area.

==== Centralist Republic of Mexico period ====
Under territorial governor José Figueroa, some of the Kumeyaay from Mission San Diego were allowed to resettle and establish San Pasqual pueblo in 1835, who would later become the San Pasqual Band of Diegueno Mission Indians. In 1837, men from the pueblo attacked a band led by Claudio, an anti-Christian leader who had raided a Mission San Diego rancho. They killed nine of its warriors and captured Claudio, who was handed over to Mexican authorities.

With conditions worsening, the Kumeyaay attacked Rancho Tecate in 1836, one of the first raids of the Kumeyaay–Mexican War. The alcalde of San Diego sent an expedition against the Kumeyaay, but it returned without success. The failure also weakened Mexico's ability to suppress talk of secession in Alta California.

Further Kumeyaay raids on El Cajon (1836) and Rancho Jamul (1837) threatened the security of San Diego, as many residents of San Diego fled the city. The Kumeyaay were able to attack San Diego in the late 1830s. Kumeyaay advancements into Rancho Bernardo in the north and San Ysidro and Tijuana to the south at the end of the decade threatened to cut off San Diego from the rest of the Centralist Republic of Mexico. The Kumeyaay made preparations to lay siege on San Diego in the early 1840s and launched a second attack on San Diego in June 1842. However, San Diego managed to defend itself once more. While the siege failed, the Kumeyaay managed to control much of the south, east, and most of the north of the settlement, with the town becoming dependent on sea access maintain connections to the rest of Mexico. Together with Quechan resistance in the east, the Kumeyaay cut off Alta California of all land routes to the rest of the Mexican republic between the Colorado River and the Pacific Ocean up until the Mexican–American War, further threatening Mexican control of the southern Alta California coast. The Kumeyaay prevented Mexican usage of the ranchos around San Diego and evicted most of the Californios in the area by 1844, and continued launching raids deep into the Mexican controlled coast up until the start of the Mexican–American War. The Mexican settlers became refugees on Point Loma as they waited for ships, hoping to evacuate from San Diego as Kumeyaay victories challenged their ability to hold the pueblo.

==== Mexican–American War ====
Battle of San Pasqual, picturing the Kumeyaay pueblo

During the Mexican–American War, the Kumeyaay were initially neutral. The people of the San Pasqual pueblo withdrew to the hills during the Battle of San Pasqual, in which Mexican and Californio forces defeated the Americans. According to Panto's daughter Felicita, Panto warned the Californio commander that his men would help the Americans if the fighting continued that night. In 1847, Panto lent oxen and horses to Commodore Robert F. Stockton for the American march on the Pueblo de Los Ángeles.

=== Late modern era ===
After the Mexican–American War, Kumeyaay lands were split between the U.S. and Mexico through the Mexican Cession resulting from the Treaty of Guadalupe Hidalgo.

==== Yuma War and California genocide ====
In 1851, San Diego County unilaterally charged property taxes on Native American tribes in the county and threatened to confiscate land and property should they fail to pay up. This led to the San Diego Tax Rebellion of 1851 or "Garra's Revolt", with the destruction of Warner's Ranch led by the Cupeño, opening up a new western front of the Yuma War. The Kumeyaay agreed to join the revolt alongside Cahuilla, Cocopah, and Quechan warriors, but made no military commitments to attack San Diego or capture Fort Yuma.

However, not all Kumeyaay bands fought on the same side of the Yuma war; the San Pasqual Band of Kumeyaay fought against the Quechan campaign to attack San Diego and defeated the Quechan in the San Pasqual Valley.

The Kumeyaay withdrew from the war after the capitulation of the Cahuilla to the US and the failed attempt to capture Fort Yuma.

Compared to other California tribes, the Kumeyaay did not face the same magnitude of destruction and exploitation under the California genocide. This was due to the strategic positioning of the Kumeyaay and the lack of gold in the mountains. Additionally, Mexican officials in Baja California Territory threatened to intervene in the conflict if they committed any atrocities on tribes along the border, due to a mix of Mexican sympathies towards the Native Californians and a fear of refugees coming across the border.

==== Establishment of Kumeyaay reservations in the U.S. ====
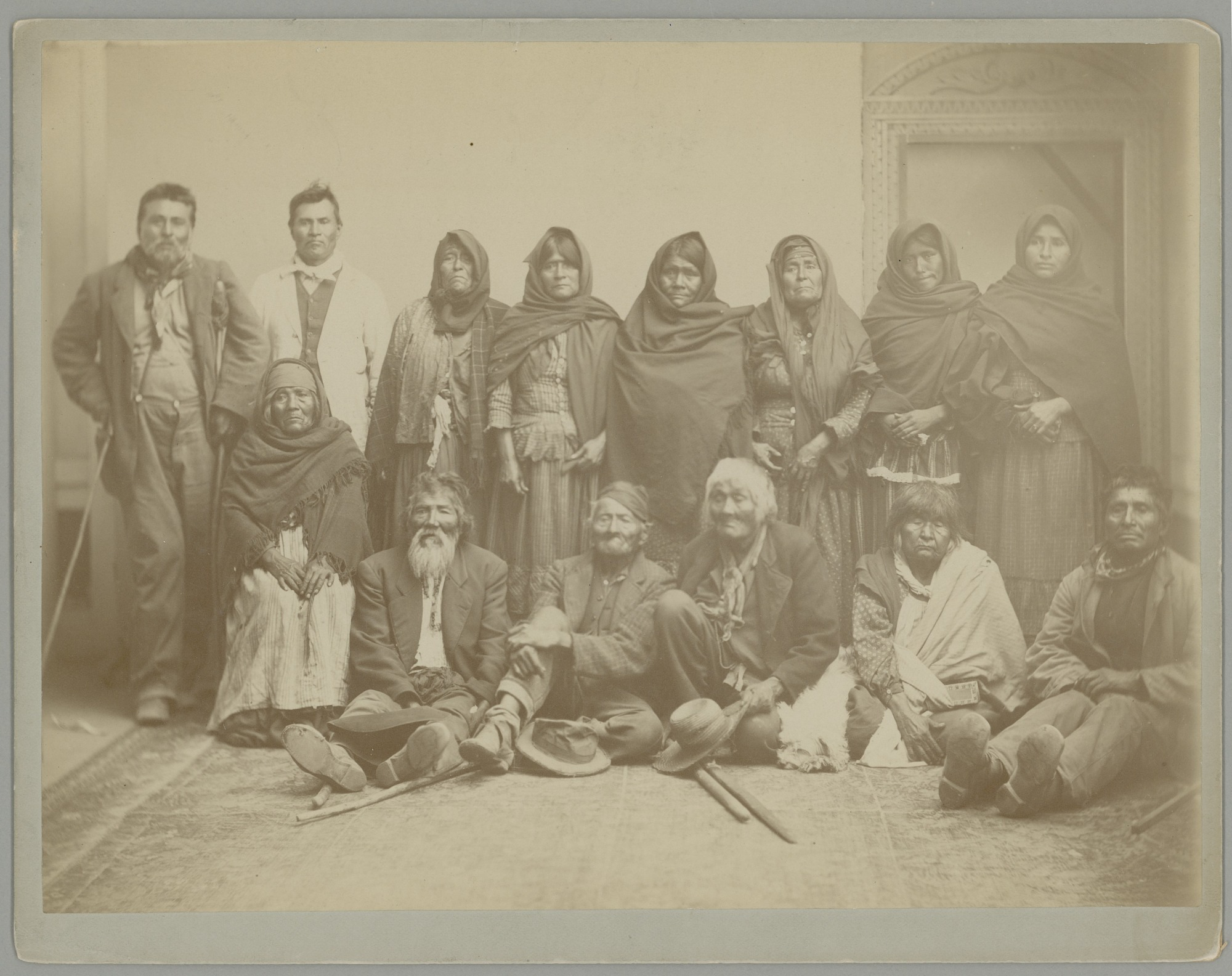
A Historical Photograph of Kumeyaay Natives by Matilda Cox Stevenson

On January 7, 1852, representatives of a number of Kumeyaay clans, including Panto, met with Commissioner Oliver M. Wozencraft and negotiated the Treaty of Santa Ysabel. The agreement was part of the "18 Treaties" of California, negotiated to protect Indian land rights. After the 18 Treaties were completed, the documents were sent to the United States Senate for approval. Under pressure from white settlers and the California Senate delegation, the treaties were all rejected.

From 1870 to 1910, American settlers seized lands, including arable and Native gathering lands. In 1875, President Ulysses S. Grant created reservations in the area, and additional lands were placed under trust patent status after the passage of the 1891 Act for the Relief of Mission Indians. The reservations tended to be small and lacked adequate water supplies. The situation was made worse during the famine of 1880–1881, which forced many Kumeyaay to survive by accepting charity from whites, as they faced diseases, starvation and attacks from white settlers.

Some Kumeyaay chose not to establish a reservation inland and sought work in San Diego, many of whom migrated to the Kumeyaay village in what is now Balboa Park led by the Florida Canyon Kumeyaay Band. The village experienced growth after receiving immigrants from other Kumeyaay bands as well as from other Indigenous Californian and Bajeno tribes, who sought work in the city, transforming the village into a neighborhood integrated into the city fabric. The village was then demolished in the early 1900s in preparation for the 1915 Panama–California Exposition, displacing the residents of the village.

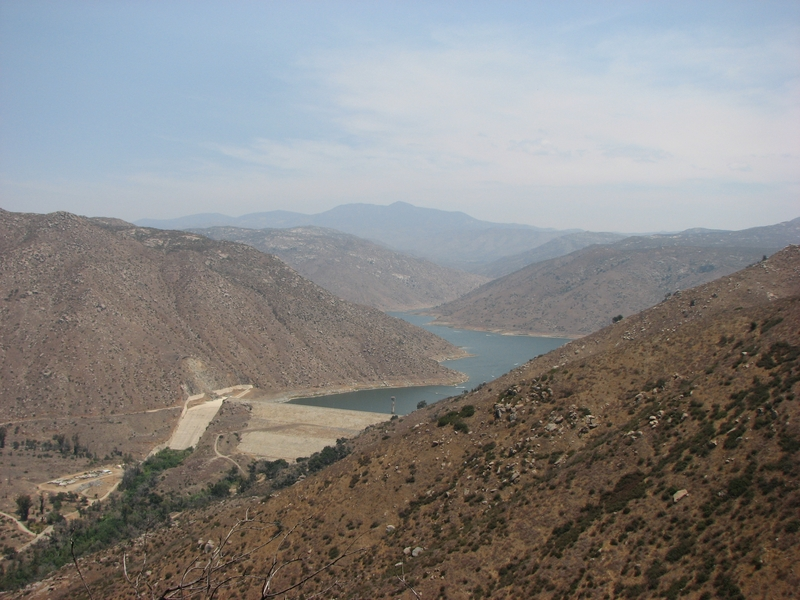
Kumeyaay were displaced to construct El Capitan Reservoir

In 1932, the Coapan Kumeyaay living and farming on the San Diego River were removed to make way for El Capitan Dam and El Capitan Reservoir and relocated their inhabitants at the Barona Reservation and the Viejas Reservation, further cutting down the agricultural capacity of the Kumeyaay reservations.

==== Kumeyaay in the Mexican Revolution (1910–1911) ====
During the Mexican Revolution, the Magonistas gained the support of the Kumeyaay with an enthusiastic base, particularly in the Tecate region; many Kumeyaay from both sides of the border were enticed by their anarcho-syndicalist message of Indigenous liberation from the Mexican and American colonial nation-states starting with the end of the Porfirio Díaz dictatorship. The Kumeyaay supported the Magonistas as guides throughout the land, whose aid allowed them to control Mexicali, Tecate, and Tijuana during the Magonista rebellion of 1911. However, the Kumeyaay did not participate in much of the active fighting in the Magonista Rebellion, and did not participate with Cocopah, Kiliwa, and Paipai tribes in raiding on small towns or looting Chinese-Mexican businesses in the region, and may have even smuggled Chinese-Mexican refugees to the American side of the border. By the end of June, the rebellion was suppressed by the Madero administration.

After the revolution, the ban on Ejidos and other forms of communal living were lifted and the Kumeyaay were able to resume their traditional communal way of life legitimately with their communities in Valle de Las Palmas, Peña Blanca, and their five other reservations.

=== Contemporary era ===
==== Kumeyaay-American economy and casino industry ====
Kumeyaay people supported themselves by farming and agricultural wage labor; however, a 20-year drought in the mid-20th century crippled the region's dry farming economy. For their common welfare, several reservations in the US formed the non-profit Kumeyaay, Inc.

Cuts in Native American welfare programs under the Reagan and Bush Sr. administrations forced the reservation to find other means of income and capitalize on industries not possible off-reservation.

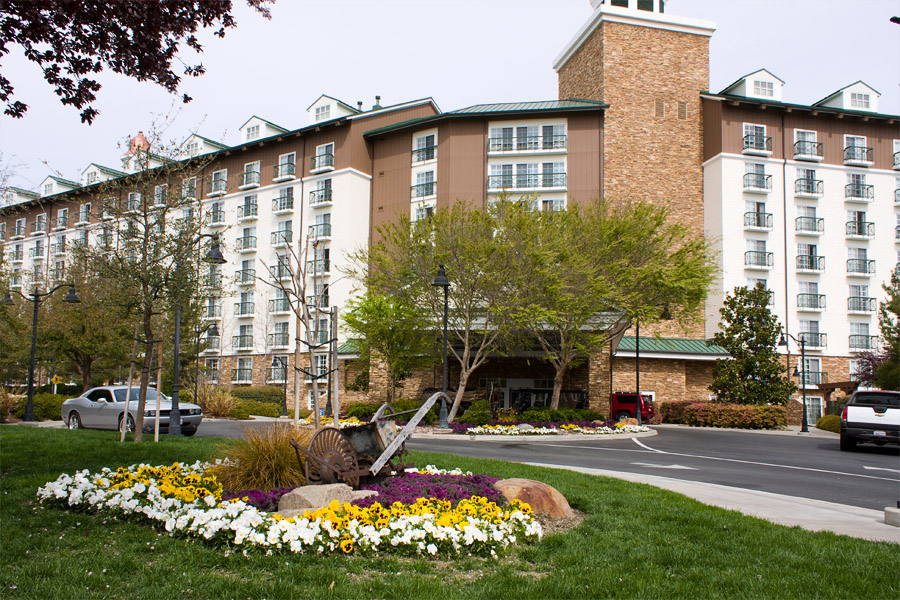
Barona Resort Hotel

In 1982, the Barona Band won its case in Barona Group of the Capitan Grande Band of Mission Indians v. Duffy (1982) to operate high-stakes bingo games, leading to the expansion of many Kumeyaay bingo operators into the casino industry. This helped establish Las Vegas-style gaming operations in the reservations in the region, evaporating reservation unemployment and poverty in a short time. In total, the Kumeyaay operate six casinos: Barona Valley Ranch Resort and Casino, Sycuan Resort and Casino, Viejas Casino & Resort, Valley View Casino and Hotel, Golden Acorn Casino and Travel Center, and Jamul Casino.

In response to the casino construction boom, the San Diego County government maintained a policy of opposition to any growth in tribal expansion under any circumstance in fears that land would be used to build more casinos, which broke down relations between the County and the Kumeyaay, Payomkawichum (Luiseño), and Kuupangaxwichem (Cupeño) tribal reservation governments. This San Diego County Board of Supervisors repealed these policies in May 2021.

The relative success of gaming operations on many reservations has allowed them to buy naming rights of infrastructure around the San Diego region, such as the Sycuan Green Line of the San Diego Trolley and the SDSU Viejas Arena. Some reservations have also diversified their economic profile such as Campo Reservation-based Muht Hei inc which oversees the reservation's wind farm or Sycuan Band's acquisition of the U.S. Grant Hotel. Additionally, Sycuan also became the first Native American tribe to own part of a professional soccer franchise by becoming the co-owner of San Diego FC, a Major League Soccer expansion team, and the second to have an ownership stake in any professional sports team. With the San Diego Padres being sold from the family of Peter Seidler in 2026, it was announced that Sycuan would also have a minority ownership in the new ownership group

==== Kumeyaay-Mexican economy and the wine tourism industry ====
On the Mexican side of the border, Kumeyaay communities manufacture traditional craftwork to sell on the American side of the border with partnering Kumeyaay souvenir gift shops and casinos.

Many Kumeyaay there have moved into urban areas to seek better employment opportunities compared to their agrarian employment on the communities. The depopulation of their villages has allowed neighboring non-Native Ejidos to encroach on their lands.

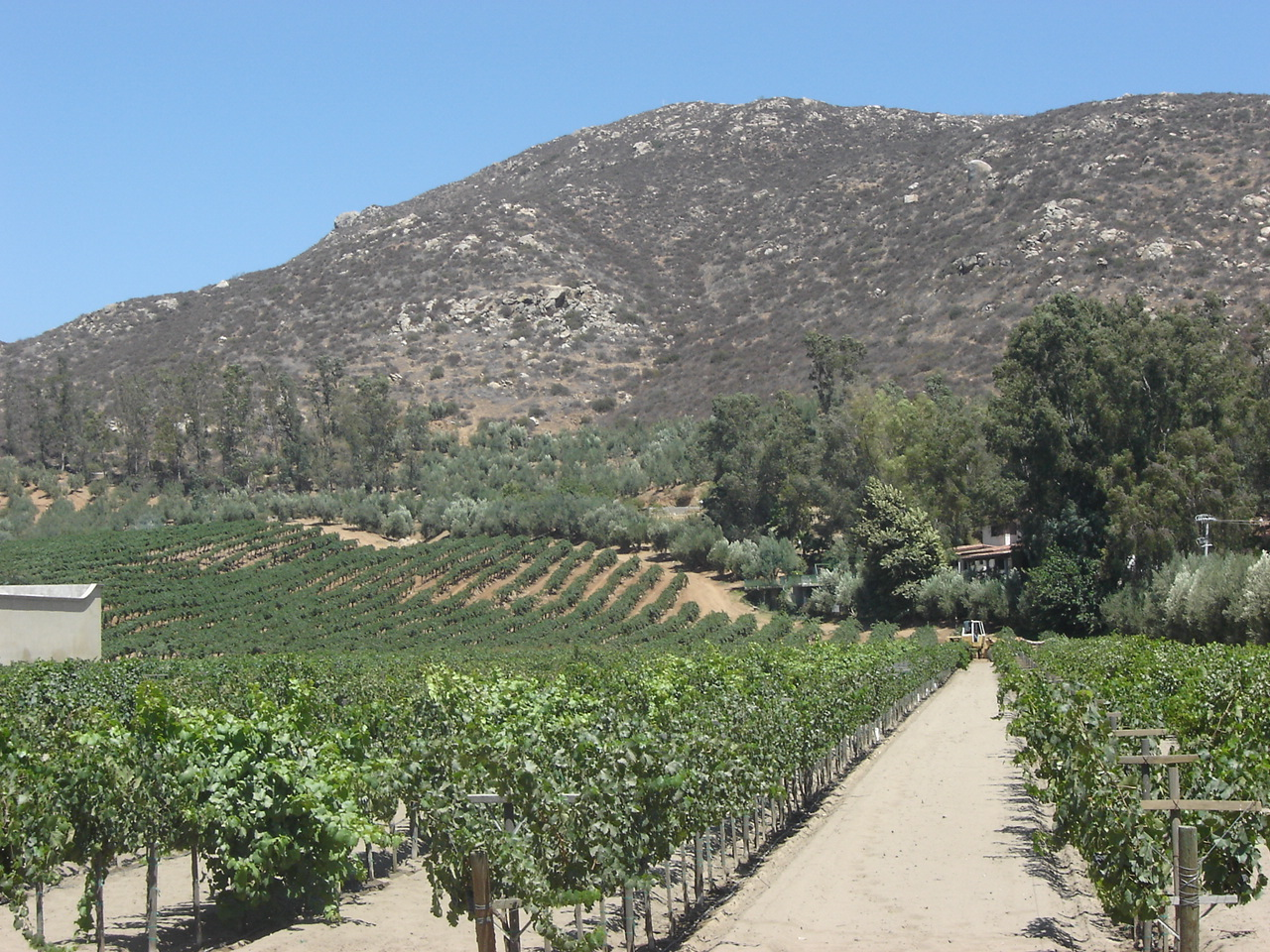
Valle de Guadalupe (Guadalupe Valley), Baja California, Mexico

The Kumeyaay communities on the Mexican side of the border have largely retained their traditional heritage. Some villages faced water shortages, making it difficult to continue agricultural operation, which they portray in their film Kumeyaay Land. This led many communities to enter wine-tasting and tourism industries in the Guadalupe Valley. Many bands began launching wine tours and festivals to attract tourists and foreign visitors from southern California and cruise passengers stopping at the Port of Ensenada.

==== Kumeyaay and the US-Mexican border ====
In 1998, the Kumeyaay established the Kumeyaay Border task force to work with federal immigration officials to secure free passage of Baja Kumeyaay bands to visit the US Kumeyaay bands and ensure their rights to protected graves and artifacts protected by the Native American Graves Protection and Repatriation Act of 1990.

However, border wall construction accelerated in 2020 and Kumeyaay representatives at the border to protect and preserve Kumeyaay artifacts were turned away from the construction area. This sparked protests among the bands and Kumeyaay women organized to lead a protest at the border in July. The La Posta Band filed a lawsuit in August against the Trump administration seeking to block further construction of the border wall through their sacred cemetery (burial sites).

== Society ==
=== Traditional society ===
==== Social structure ====
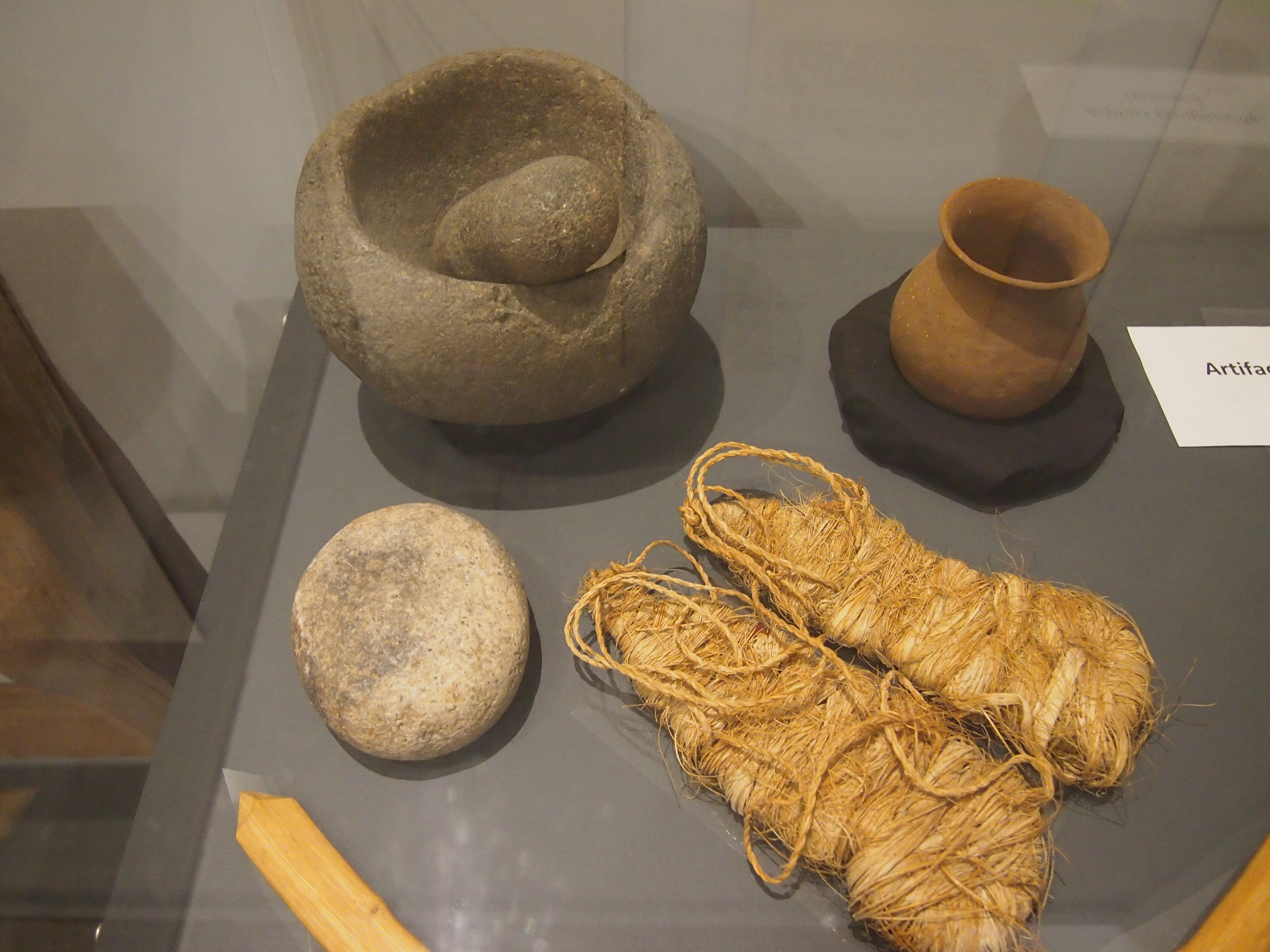
Kumeyaay items

Prior to Western assimilation, the Kumeyaay were organized into bands or clans called sibs or shiimull, which were grounded in family lineages with each sib home for 5 to 15 families. Each sib had their own territory and had the right to enforce land property rights in punishing thieves and trespassers. However, Kumeyaay did recognize the right to water and were also obligated to share food with visitors.

The Kumeyaay had a patriarchal society where the position of chief, or Kwaapaay, was inherited from the father to son, although widows were sometimes permitted to assume the position. It was the Kwaapaay's role to protect traditions, hold ceremonies, and resolve disputes and was responsible for political, religious, and economic activities of the sib. Future Kwaapaays were often selected by a Kwaapaay of another with no family relations to ensure impartiality.

Kwaapaays were also accompanied by assistants and had a council of Kuseyaays. Kuseyaays were made up of male or female priests, doctors, and other specialists in the fields of health, ecology, resource management, tradition, and religion. Kuseyaays could be called by the kwaapaay to provide information or to make decisions for the sib's welfare. Each family in the sib was allowed to follow and participate in the decision making, or could leave the sib and pursue their own decision.

The Kumeyaay practiced arranged marriage made by parents of different sibs. The future husband was expected to demonstrate his ability to hunt and needed to present the future bride the game he had killed. The bride would move into the husband's sib once they were married. Marriage relations were also made between sibs and other neighboring tribal groups as a gesture of peace between warring groups or as part of a trade relationship.

==== Shelter ====
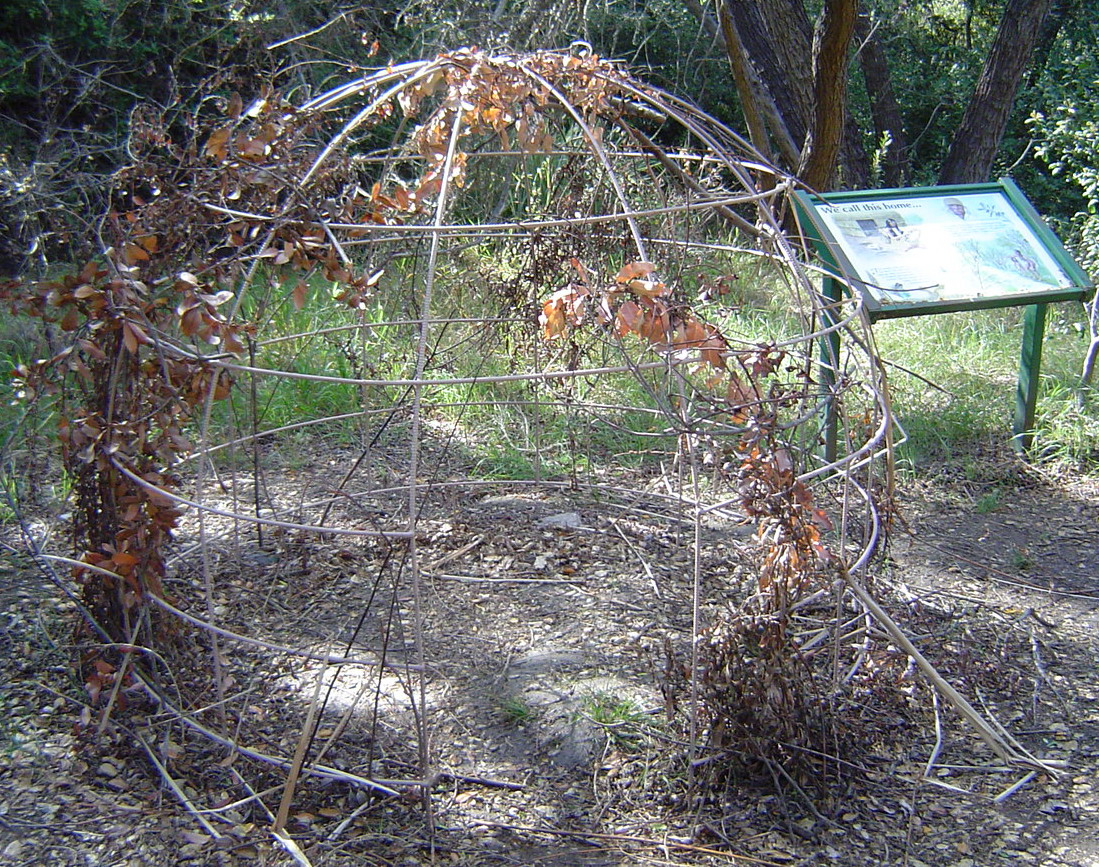
Frame of an ‘ewaa

Kumeyaay generally lived in dome-shaped homes made from branches and covered with leaves of willow or tule, called 'ewaa. These structures had a hole at the top to let smoke out and rocks along its base to keep out wind and small animals. Some Kumeyaay who lived in the mountains made their home out of slabs of bark.

These structures were often temporary. When families moved or if someone died in the house, they were often burned down.

==== Clothing ====
During warm seasons, men wore nothing except for a hide breechcloth to hold tools while women wore an apron or a skirt made from willow or elderberry bark. In the colder months, they would wear blankets made from willow bark or rabbit skins.

They wore agave sandals made from yucca and agave fibers when going over long distances, over sharp rocks, or hot sand. Some would wear bead necklaces as jewelry, with beads made of clam, abalone, or olivella shells. Additionally, men could get their nose pierced and women might have their chins tattooed.

The Kumeyaay started to abandon much of their traditional clothing after coming in contact with the Spanish, and adopted European-style clothing, wearing clothes that were normal in Latin America.

==== Diet ====
Acorns were a staple of the Kumeyaay diet, and made acorn mush they called shawii, which could be used in dough to make bread by grinding with a mano and a metate. Other grains like pinon nuts or chia seeds were also stone-ground and consumed. The Kumeyaay stored these grains in basket granaries made of willow leaves. They also consumed the leaves and fruits of the prickly pear and copal cactus, as well as cherries, plums, elderberries, and Manzanita berries. They also fermented many of these plants with water and honey to create alcohol.

They hunted for animals such as birds, rabbits, squirrels, and woodrats, as well as larger animals like antelope, deer, and mountain sheep. The Kumeyaay also ate more nutrient-rich insects such as crickets, grubs and grasshoppers.

Kamia Kumeyaay in the Imperial Valley practiced some forms of agriculture, producing maize, beans, and teparies contrary to their mountain and coastal counterparts. The Kamia assimilated to the Patayan culture of their neighbors in the Imperial Valley and practiced a mixed subsistence economy that included floodplain cultivation as well as hunting and gathering.

==== Economy and communication ====
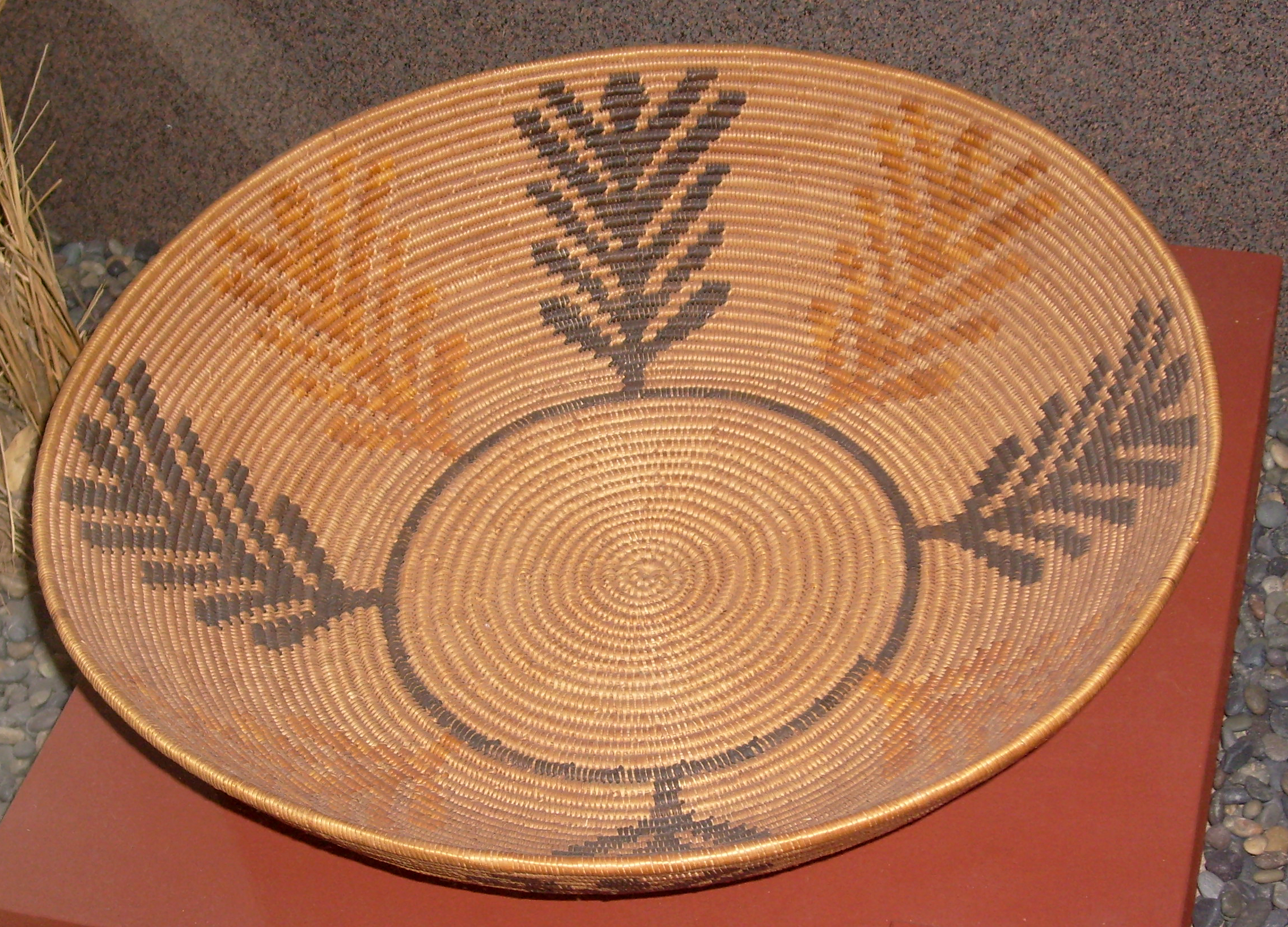
Kumeyaay coiled basket, woven by Celestine Lachapa, 19th century, San Diego Museum of Us

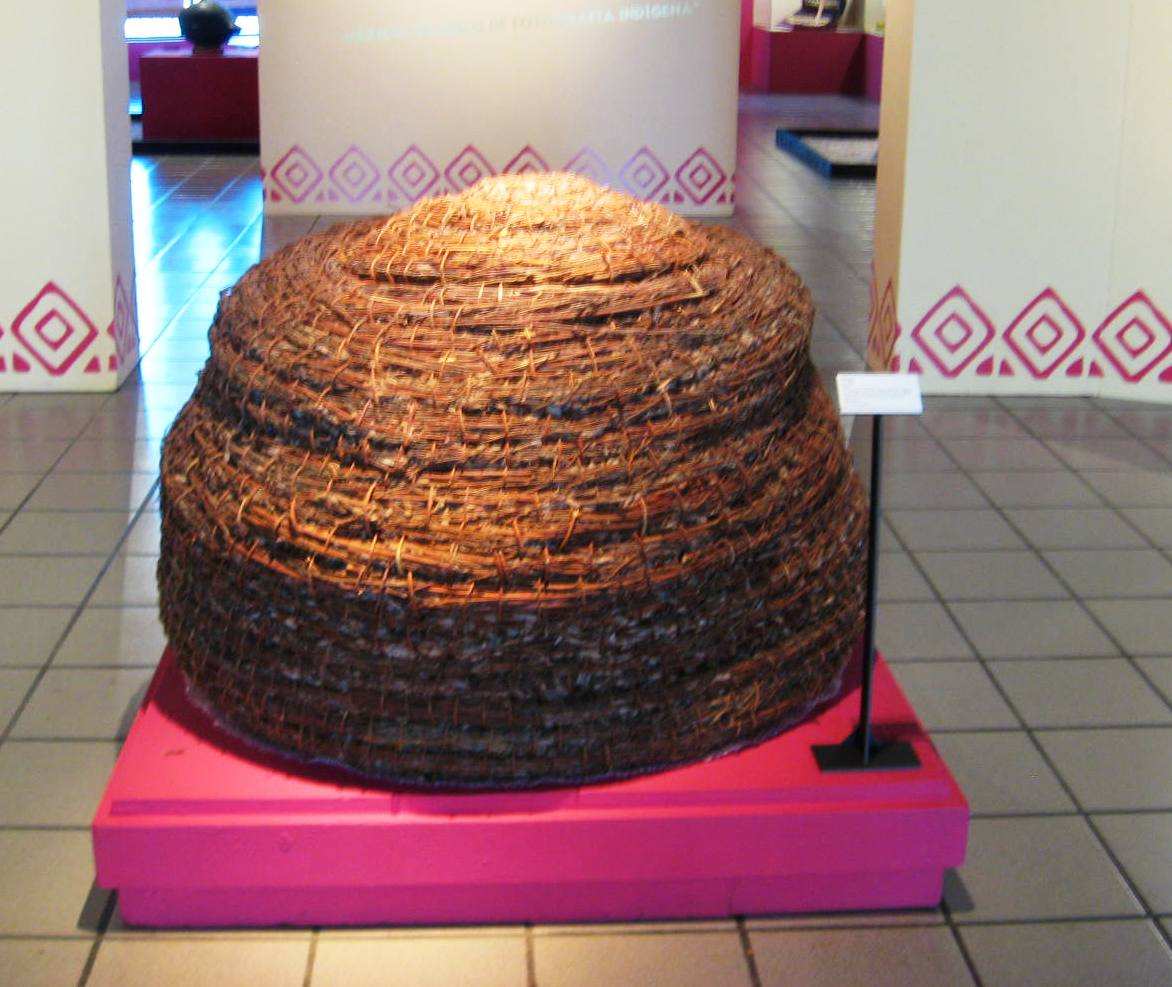
Kumeyaay willow storage basket at the Universidad Autónoma de Baja California cultural museum, Mexicali

The Ipai-Tipai Kumeyaay traded with the Kamia Kumeyaay to obtain obsidian from an area south of the Salton Sea. Within the Tipai-Ipai, the coastal Kumeyaay traded salt, seaweed, and abalone shells for acorns, agave, mesquite beans, and gourds from the mountain Kumeyaay. They also traded along the Pacific coast to obtain Olivella shell beads from the Chumash, as well as tribes along the Gulf of California and in the American Southwest as far east as to trade with the Zuni. To support their maritime economy, they manufactured fishing spears, hooks, and nets made of agave fiber.

Upon Spanish arrival, woven baskets were highly prized by the Europeans, as these baskets were so well made that they could hold water and it was possible to cook food with these baskets in an open fire. The strong demand for Californian woven baskets in Mexican and European markets strengthened the basket weaving economy among the Kumeyaay.

The Kumeyaay had a system of trail runners who carried messages and announcements between bands, which notified the presence of the Spaniards prior to Cabrillo's arrival in San Diego.

==== Weaponry ====
The Kumeyaay used archery in order to hunt prey. The arrows were made of wood, reeds, or cane, as well as chamise or greasewood plant for larger animals. Bows were made of mesquite or ash, as well as animal hides. They also equipped with throwing sticks better known as rabbit sticks, which were used to knock out small animals and were sometimes used in war.

==== Culture ====
Kumeyaay cultural traditions place strong emphasis on oral performance, including song cycles, storytelling, and ceremonial music. Bird songs, which recount ancestral migrations and regional landscapes, remain one of the most prominent forms of traditional verbal art among Kumeyaay communities. These songs are performed at social and ceremonial gatherings and continue to function as a repository of historical knowledge and cultural identity.

The Kumeyaay has a continuous song and dance culture, of which many are still passed on to the next generation during special occasions. Occasions like the mourning of an important figure was honored by an Eagle Dance, and a War Dance accompanied those heading for battle. Men often sang songs with a rattle, while women supported the song through dance. Through the Mission, the Kumeyaay picked up skills in Western musical instruments, and joined the Mission choirs and orchestras.

In Kumeyaay mythology, sacred mountains like Kuuchamaa (Tecate Peak) are thought to be powerful spiritual hubs. The tribe worships gods like Coyote—who changes the world by doing clever or mischievous things. Coyote shows up in lots of indigenous Californian traditions and can act as a trickster, a shape-shifter, or a teacher.

==== Stories ====
One Kumeyaay creation story involves the original state of the world as being covered with salt water and tule, without land. The older brother Tuchaipa (also known as Tu-chai-pai, Tcaipakomat) and the younger twin brother Yokomatis (Yo-ko-mat-is) make the world. Tuchaipa rubs tobacco in his hand and blows it three times, causing the heavens to rise up and form the sky. He draws a line from east to west, named Y-nak and A-uk. He draws a line from north to south, named Ka-tulk and Ya-wak. He tells Yo-ko-mat-is that from the east three or four men are coming from the east, and from the east three or four Indians are coming, and he makes hills and valleys with hollows of water so the humans will not die of dehydration. He makes forests so humans will not die of cold. Then he makes humans out of mud, who can walk but never get tired, and tells them that they must walk to the east towards the light. When the humans reach the Sun, he makes the Moon, and tells the men they must run races when the Moon is small. Later, when there is less food and water, Tuchaipa calls together the men without the women and gives them three choices; to die forever; to live for a time and return; or to live forever. The men are divided over what to choose, and talk and talk without knowing what to do. Then the fly comes and says to choose to die forever, and so the men choose to be done with life and die forever. This is the reason why the fly rubs his hands together, to beg the forgiveness of humans.

In another story, Tcaipakomat and Yokomatis have their eyes closed from the blinding salt water. Yokomatis tries to see atop the water, but opens his eyes and is blinded. Tcaipakomat goes on top of the water and sees nothing, so he makes little red ants (miskiluiw, ciracir) which fill the water with their bodies to make land. Then Tcaipakomat makes a type of black bird with a flat bill (xanyil) to come into being, but they were lost without their roosts, so Tcaipakomat takes red clay, yellow clay, and black clay to make a round flat object, and throws it into the sky to make a dimly-shining moon (halya). Tcaipakomat tries again with another piece of clay to make the brighter sun (inyau). Then he takes a light colored piece of clay (mutakwic), and splits it up, making a man, and the a woman (Sinyaxau, First Woman). The children of this man and this woman are people (ipai).

=== Reservation era society ===
==== Education ====
The Kumeyaay Community College was created by the Sycuan Band to serve the Kumeyaay-Diegueño Nation, and describes its mission as "to support cultural identity, sovereignty, and self-determination while meeting the needs of Native and non-Native students". The college's focus is on "Kumeyaay History, Kumeyaay Ethnobotany and traditional Indigenous arts". It "serves and relies on resources from the thirteen reservations of the Kumeyaay Nation situated in San Diego county". In the fall of 2016, Cuyamaca College began offering an associate degree in Kumeyaay Studies with courses at its Rancho San Diego campus, as well as at Kumeyaay Community College on the Sycuan reservation.

The Sycuan Institute on Tribal Gaming was also established at SDSU by the Sycuan Band with the focus on research and policy related to the tribal gaming industry.

==== Community and cultural life ====
Kumeyaay funerals and mourning ceremonies (Takaay) incorporate song sequences that can include up to 117 individual songs, continuing for up to 24 hours, with rhythm supplied by gourd or tortoiseshell rattles rather than drums. The songs survived the Mission era in part because Spanish missionaries did not identify them as having religious content, unlike the ceremonies they actively suppressed. Bird singing continues to be practiced at inter-band gatherings and functions as a vehicle for transmitting historical knowledge across generations.

Kumiai communities in Baja California maintain kinship and ceremonial ties to US-side bands, with cross-border ceremony participation requiring visa arrangements on both sides of the border, as post-9/11 security measures significantly complicated what had previously been informal community visits. Modified visa procedures negotiated with Mexican and US consular officials allowed Kumiai to attend ceremonial events in the United States, with Mexico's Indigenous affairs agency issuing identification cards and approximately 1,900 Kumiai eventually holding laser visas for this purpose. Traditional crafts including pottery and basket weaving remain more intact in the isolated Baja communities than on the US side, partly because geographic remoteness sustained conditions closer to pre-contact subsistence practices.

== Population ==
Estimates for the pre-contact populations of most Native groups in California have varied substantially. In 1925, Alfred L. Kroeber proposed that the population of the Kumeyaay in the San Diego region in 1770 had been about 3,000. More recently, Katharine Luomala points out that this estimate depended on calculations of rates of baptisms at the Mission, and as such "ignores the unbaptized". She suggests that the region could have supported 6,000–9,000 people. Florence C. Shipek goes further, estimating 16,000–19,000 inhabitants.

In the late eighteenth century, it is estimated that the Kumeyaay population was between 3,000 and 9,000. In 1828, 1,711 Kumeyaay were recorded by the missions. The 1860 federal census recorded 1,571 Kumeyaay living in 24 villages. The Bureau of Indian Affairs recorded 1,322 Kumeyaay in 1968, with 435 living on reservations. By 1990, an estimated 1,200 lived on reservation lands, while 2,000 lived elsewhere.

== Tribes and reservations ==
Kumeyaay Reservations in San Diego County with current federally recognized reservations (green) and former reservations (red).
Kumeyaay Villages in Mexico with federally recognized villages (green) and unrecognized villages (red)

Kumeyaay reservations and village communities
Reservation	Language affiliation	Location	Associated Kumeyaay village(s)	Population	Federal recognition	Area in mi^{2} (km^{2})			Includes ORTL?
Reservation	Language affiliation	Location	Associated Kumeyaay village(s)	Population	Federal recognition	Land	Water	Total	Includes ORTL?
Inaja Band of Diegueno Mission Indians of the Inaja and Cosmit Reservation	'Iipay	San Diego County	Inyaha Cosmit	15	1875	1.34 (3.48)	0	1.34 (3.48)	no
Mesa Grande Band of Diegueno Mission Indians of the Mesa Grande Reservation	'Iipay	San Diego County	Tekemak Kumehall	98	1875	2.73 (7.06)	0	2.73 (7.06)	no
San Pasqual Band of Diegueno Mission Indians of California	'Iipay	San Diego County	Ahmukatlatl (Pueblo San Pasqual)	1,097	1910	2.24 (5.79)	0	2.24 (5.79)	no
Iipay Nation of Santa Ysabel (formerly Santa Ysabel Band of Diegueno Mission Indians of the Santa Ysabel Reservation)	'Iipay	San Diego County	Elcuanan (Santa Ysabel)	330	1893	23.42 (60.67)	0	23.42 (60.67)	no
Laguna Indian Reservation (Kwaaymii Reservation) (defunct 1989)	'Iipay	San Diego County	Inyahkai? Aha-Hakaik?	0	1947 (defunct)				no
Campo Band of Diegueno Mission Indians of the Campo Indian Reservation	Tiipay	San Diego County	Meelqsh G'tay	362	1893	25.76 (66.73)	0	25.76 (66.73)	no
Capitan Grande Band of Diegueno Mission Indians of California	Tiipay, 'Iipay	San Diego County	'E-quilsch a-mahk (Cuyamac)	0	1875	24.88 (64.43)	0.00032 (0.00083)	24.88 (64.43)	no
Barona Group of Capitan Grande Band of Mission Indians of the Barona Reservation	Tiipay, 'Iipay	San Diego County		640	1875	9.31 (24.12)	0	9.31 (24.12)	no
Viejas (Baron Long) Group of Capitan Grande Band of Mission Indians of the Viejas Reservation	Tiipay, 'Iipay	San Diego County	Matkwatay	520	1875	2.51 (6.50)	0	2.51 (6.50)	no
Ewiiaapaayp Band of Kumeyaay Indians (formerly the Cuyapaipe Community of Diegueno Mission Indians of the Cuyapaipe Reservation)	Tiipay	San Diego County	Ewiiaapaay	7	1893	8.55 (22.14)	0	8.55 (22.14)	no
Jamul Indian Village of California	Tiipay	San Diego County	Hamul	60	1975	0.023 (0.060)	0	0.023 (0.060)	no
La Posta Band of Diegueno Mission Indians of the La Posta Indian Reservation	Tiipay	San Diego County	Amai'tu	55	1893	6.39 (16.56)	0	6.39 (16.56)	no
Manzanita Band of Diegueno Mission Indians of the Manzanita Reservation	Tiipay, Kamia	San Diego County	Snyaawkwatun	78	1893	7.17 (18.58)	0	7.17 (18.58)	yes
Sycuan Band of the Kumeyaay Nation	Tiipay	San Diego County	Sekwan	211	1875	1.28 (3.31)	0	1.28 (3.31)	yes
Village community	Language affiliation	Location	Kumeyaay name	Population	Recognized communities in Mexico				
Aguaje de la Tuna (Tecate)	Tiipay	Tecate Municipality	Ha'samen	18	No				
Juntas de Neji	Tiipay	Tecate Municipality	Neji	25	Yes				
Peña Blanca	Tiipay	Tecate Municipality	'Ui'hapal	2	No				
San José de la Zorra	Tiipay	Playas de Rosarito Municipality Ensenada Municipality	Mat Purjao; Iškišup?	77	Yes				
La Huerta	Tiipay	Ensenada Municipality	Axta	131	Yes				
San Antonio Necua	Tiipay	Ensenada Municipality	Eñekwa	204	Yes				
Santa Catarina	Tiipay, Kamia	Ensenada Municipality		133	Yes				

== Villages ==
=== Present-day cities with Kumeyaay village origins ===
- Kosa'aay (Cosoy) (San Diego)
- Pa-tai (Ensenada)
- Pawai (Poway)
- Sinyweche (Santee)
- Tecate
- Tecuan (Tijuana)

=== Other former villages in the US ===
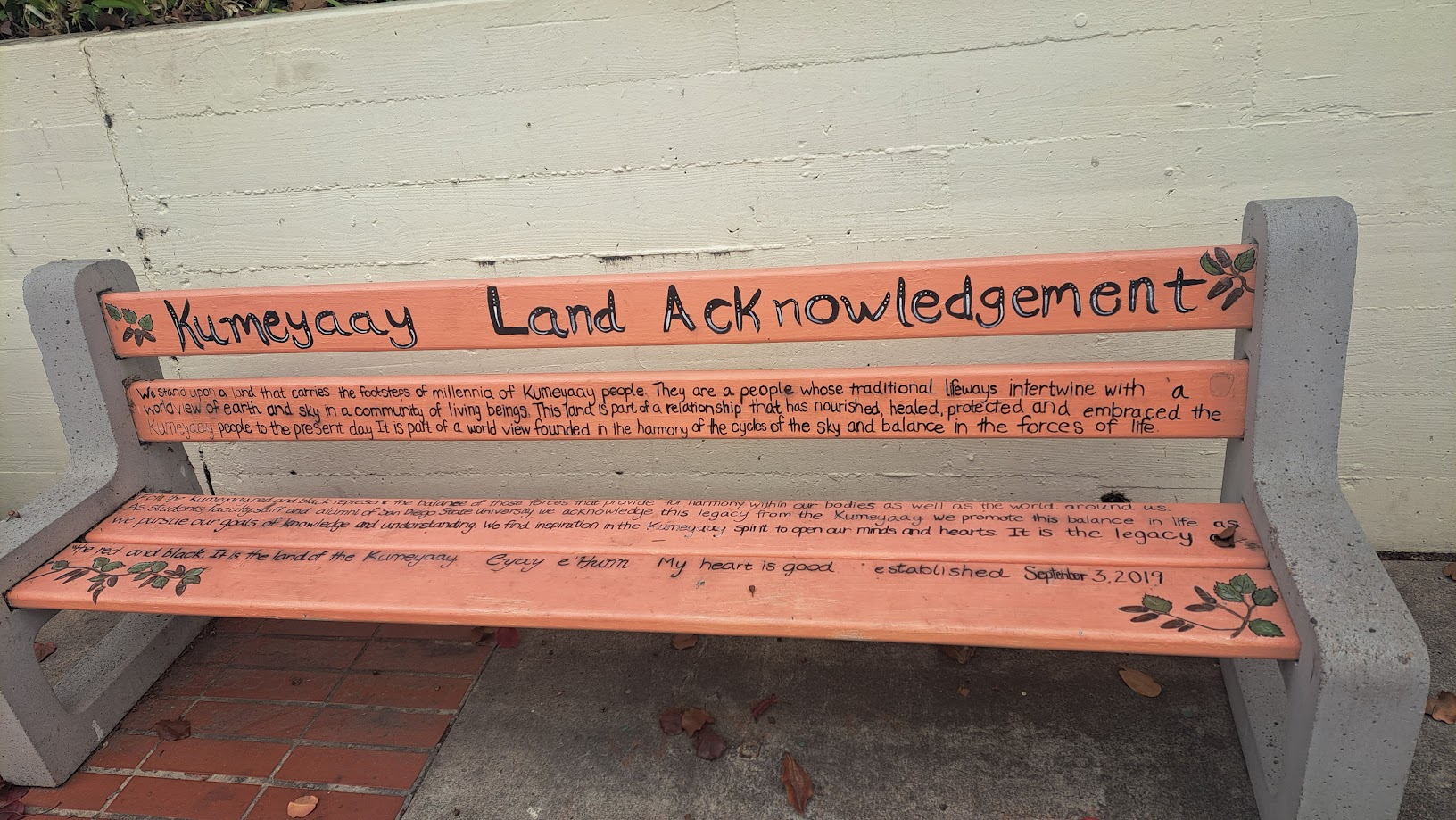
Kumeyaay Land Acknowledgement bench art at San Diego State University

In Tepacul Watai (City of San Diego in 'Iipay Kumeyaay):

- Nyip 'ewai (Nipaquay) (Mission Valley)
- Matt Xtaat (Choyas) (Barrio Logan)
- Utay (Otay Mesa)
- Jamo (Pacific Beach)
- 'Iilh Taawaa (Ystagua) (Sorrento Valley)
- Milh Ixox (Melijo) (Tijuana River Valley)
- Onap (San Clemente Canyon)
- Tisirr (Downtown San Diego)
- Totakamalam (Point Loma)
- Sinyau-Pichkara (Rancho Bernardo)
- Awil-Nyawa (Rancho Peñasquitos)
- Ahwell-ewa (North City, San Diego)
- Hatam's Village (within the former Native American neighborhood in San Diego) (Balboa Park)

In the County of San Diego

- Chaip/Chayp (Chula Vista)
- Meti (National City, California)
- Neti (Spring Valley, San Diego County, California)
- 'Aa Kuskilly (Apusquel) (Bonita, California)
- Tapin/Jacunmat (El Cajon)
- Matt Tumau (Matamo) (El Cajon near Dehesa, California)
- Milh 'Ewa (Michegua) (Sycramore Canyon, Santee, California)
- Alyshuhwi (Imperial Beach)
- Hayal/Jayal (Olivenhain, Encinitas)
- Hakutl (Encinitas)
- Kulaumai (Solana Beach)
- Tehayiiw/Ajopunquile (La Costa)
- Hamashaw (Jamacha)
- Canapu (Ramona, California)
- Shpank/Epegam (Ballena, California)
- Hapatul
- Cojuat
- Hakwa (Anza-Borrego)
- Hortluke (near Ranchita)
- Winal (near Ocotillo Wells)
- Wi-i (near Ocotillo Wells)

In Imperial County

- Kwpol (Imperial, California)
- Sitcarknyewa (near Brawley, California)
- Matakal (near Rockwood, California)
- Hacamikalau

=== Other former villages in Mexico ===
In the Municipality of Tijuana

- Kwa-kwa (Cuero de Venado)
- Wanya pu:wam (Cerro de Bonifacia)
- We-ilmex (near Presa El Carrizo)
- Mat g'tay
- Mat Hasil Ewik Kakap (Islas Coronado)

In the Municipality of Tecate

- Mat'haina:l (Villareal de San José)
- Cikaú (Tanama)
- Mat'kwoho:l (Cañon Manteca)
- Uap 'cu:l uit (Cañon Manteca)
- Ja-kwak-wak (Las Juntas)
- Hacamum/Ha'kumum (Agua Tule)
- Metot'tai (Valle de las Palmas)
- Kwat' Kunšapax (Las Calabazas)
- Cukwapa:l (El Compadre)
- 'Ui'ha'tumer
- Mutu Cata (Cañon del Cansio)
- Jat'ám (Santa Clara)
- Ha'mat'tai (Jamatay)
- Ha'kume (Ejido Jacume)

In the Municipality of Mexicali

- Hwat Nyaknyuma (Ejido Lázaro Cárdenas)
- Wekwilul
- Hakwisiay

In the Municipality of Ensenada

- Jhlumúk (Valle de Guadalupe)
- Jiurr-jiurr (Agua Escondida)
- Kwar Nuwa (El Sauzal)
- 'Ui'cikwar (Real del Castillo)
- Yiu kwiñi:l (Ojos Negros)
- Ha'cur (San Salvador)
- Hispap
- Matnuk
- Hakwisay
- Hacukpin
- Hameskiny

== See also ==
- Cinon Duro Mataweer
- Kumeyaay traditional narratives
- Kumeyaay astronomy
- O. M. Wozencraft negotiated the Treaty of Santa Ysabel on January 7, 1852.
- Sycuan Institute on Tribal Gaming at San Diego State University
- Viejas Arena at San Diego State University
- Viejas Casino

== Bibliography ==
- Erlandson, Jon M.; Rick, Torben C.; Jones, Terry L.; Porcasi, Judith F. (2010). "One If by Land, Two If by Sea: Who Were the First Californians?". In Jones, Terry L.; Klar, Kathryn A. (eds.). California Prehistory: Colonization, Culture and Complexity. Lanham, MD: AltaMira Press. pp. 53–62. ISBN 978-0-75911-960-4.
- Field, Margaret (2017). "Recontextualizing Kumeyaay oral literature for the twenty-first century". In Kroskrity, Paul V.; Meek, Barbra A. (eds.). Engaging Native American Publics: Linguistic Anthropology in a Collaborative Key. Taylor & Francis. pp. 41–59. ISBN 978-1-31736-128-2.
- Gray-Kanatiiosh, Barbara A. (2010). Kumeyaay. ABDO Publishing Company. ISBN 978-1-617-84911-4.
- Hoffman, Geralyn Marie; Gamble, Lynn H. (2006). A Teacher's Guide to Historical and Contemporary Kumeyaay Culture. Institute for Regional Studies of the Californias, San Diego State University. ISBN 978-0-92561-351-6.
- Luomala, Katharine (1978). "Tipai-Ipai". In Heizer, Robert F. (ed.). Handbook of North American Indians. Vol. 8: California. Washington, DC: Smithsonian Institution. pp. 592–609. ISBN 978-0-16004-574-5.
- Miller, Amy (2001). A grammar of Jamul Tiipay. Mouton de Gruyter. ISBN 978-3-110-86482-3.
- Miskwish, Michael Connolly; Zwink, Joel (2006). Sycuan: Our People, Our Culture, Our History: Honoring the Past, Building the Future. El Cajon, CA: Sycuan Band of the Kumeyaay Nation.
- Muñoz, Gabriel Trujillo (2012). La utopía del norte fronterizo: La revolución anarcosindicalista de 1911. San Ángel, Del. Álvaro Obregón, México, 01000, DF: Instituto Nacional de Estudios Históricos de las Revoluciones de México. pp. 30–31. ISBN 978-6-07791-683-3.
- Pritzker, Barry M. (1998). "Tipai-Ipai". Native Americans:Southwest-California-Northwest Coast-Great Basin–Plateau Native Americans: An Encyclopedia of History, Culture and Peoples. ABC-CLIO. pp. 196–197. ISBN 978-0-874-36836-9.
- Pritzker, Barry M. (2000). "Tipai-Ipai". A Native American Encyclopedia: History, Culture and Peoples. Oxford: Oxford University Press. pp. 145–147. ISBN 978-0-19513-877-1.
- Pritzker, Barry M.; Johansen, Bruce E., eds. (2007). "Tipai-Ipai". Encyclopedia of American Indian History. ABC-CLIO. p. 1071. ISBN 978-1-851-09818-7.
- Shipek, Florence C. (1978). "History of Southern California Mission Indians". In Heizer, Robert F. (ed.). Handbook of North American Indians. Vol. 8: California. Washington, DC: Smithsonian Institution. pp. 610–618. ISBN 978-0-16004-574-5.
- Shipek, Florence C. (1986). "The Impact of Europeans upon Kumeyaay Culture". In Starr, Raymond (ed.). The Impact of European Exploration and Settlement on Local Native Americans. San Diego: Cabrillo Historical Association. pp. 13–25. OCLC 17346424.
- Smith, Kalim H. (2005). Language Ideology and Hegemony in the Kumeyaay Nation: Returning the Linguistic Gaze. San Diego, CA: University of California Press. Master's Thesis.
- Waldman, Carl (2014). Encyclopedia of Native American Tribes. Infobase Publishing. ISBN 978-1-438-11010-3.
- Field, Margaret (October 2012). "Kumeyaay Language Variation, Group Identity and The Land". International Journal of American Linguistics. 78 (4): 557–573. doi:10.1086/667451. JSTOR 10.1086/667451. S2CID 147262714.
- Gamble, Lynn H.; Zepeda, Irma Carmen (2002). "Social Differentiation and Exchange among the Kumeyaay Indians during the Historic Period in California". Historical Archaeology. 36 (3): 71–91. doi:10.1007/BF03374351. JSTOR 25616993. S2CID 161306672.
- Gamble, Lynn H.; Wilken-Robertson, Michael (2008). "Kumeyaay Cultural Landscapes of Baja California's Tijuana River Watershed". Journal of California and Great Basin Anthropology. 28 (2): 127–152. JSTOR 27825888.
- Kroeber, A. L. (1925). "Handbook of the Indians of California". Bureau of American Ethnology Bulletin (78). Washington, DC.
- Langdon, Margaret (1990). Redden, James E. (ed.). "Diegueño: how many languages?". Proceedings of the 1990 Hokan-Penutian Languages Workshop. Carbondale, IL: University of Southern Illinois: 184–190.
- O’Neil, Dennish (Summer–Winter 1983). "A Shaman's "Sucking Tube" from San Diego County". California Journal of California and Great Basin Anthropology. 5 (1/2): 245–247. JSTOR 27825148.
- Sheridan, Thomas E. (Summer 1982). "Seri Bands in Cross-Cultural Perspective". Kiva. 47 (4): 185–213. doi:10.1080/00231940.1982.11760572. JSTOR 30247342.
- Shipek, Florence C. (Winter 1982). "Kumeyaay Socio-Political Structure". Journal of California and Great Basin Anthropology. 4 (2): 296–303. JSTOR 27825128.
- Underwood, Jackson (2002–2004). "Pipes and Tobacco Use Among Southern California Yuman Speakers". Journal of California and Great Basin Anthropology. 24 (1): 1–12. JSTOR 23799624.
- Van Wormer, Stephen R.; Carrico, Richard L. (1993). "Excavation and Analysis of a Stone Enclosure Complex in San Diego County". Journal of California and Great Basin Anthropology. 15 (3): 234–246. JSTOR 27825522.
