= San Pasqual Band of Diegueno Mission Indians =

Native Kumeyaay Indians in Southern California

San Pasqual Band of Diegueño Mission Indians
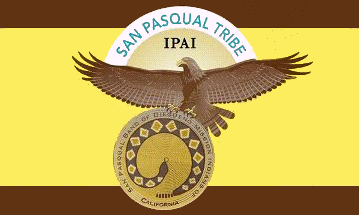

Total population
- 950 enrolled members

Regions with significant populations
- United States (California)

Languages
- Ipai, English

Religion
- Traditional tribal religion, Christianity (Roman Catholic)

Related ethnic groups
- other Kumeyaay tribes, Cocopa, Quechan, Paipai, and Kiliwa

The San Pasqual Band of Diegueño Mission Indians of California is a federally recognized tribe of Kumeyaay people, who are sometimes known as Mission Indians.

== Reservation ==
Location of San Pasqual Reservation

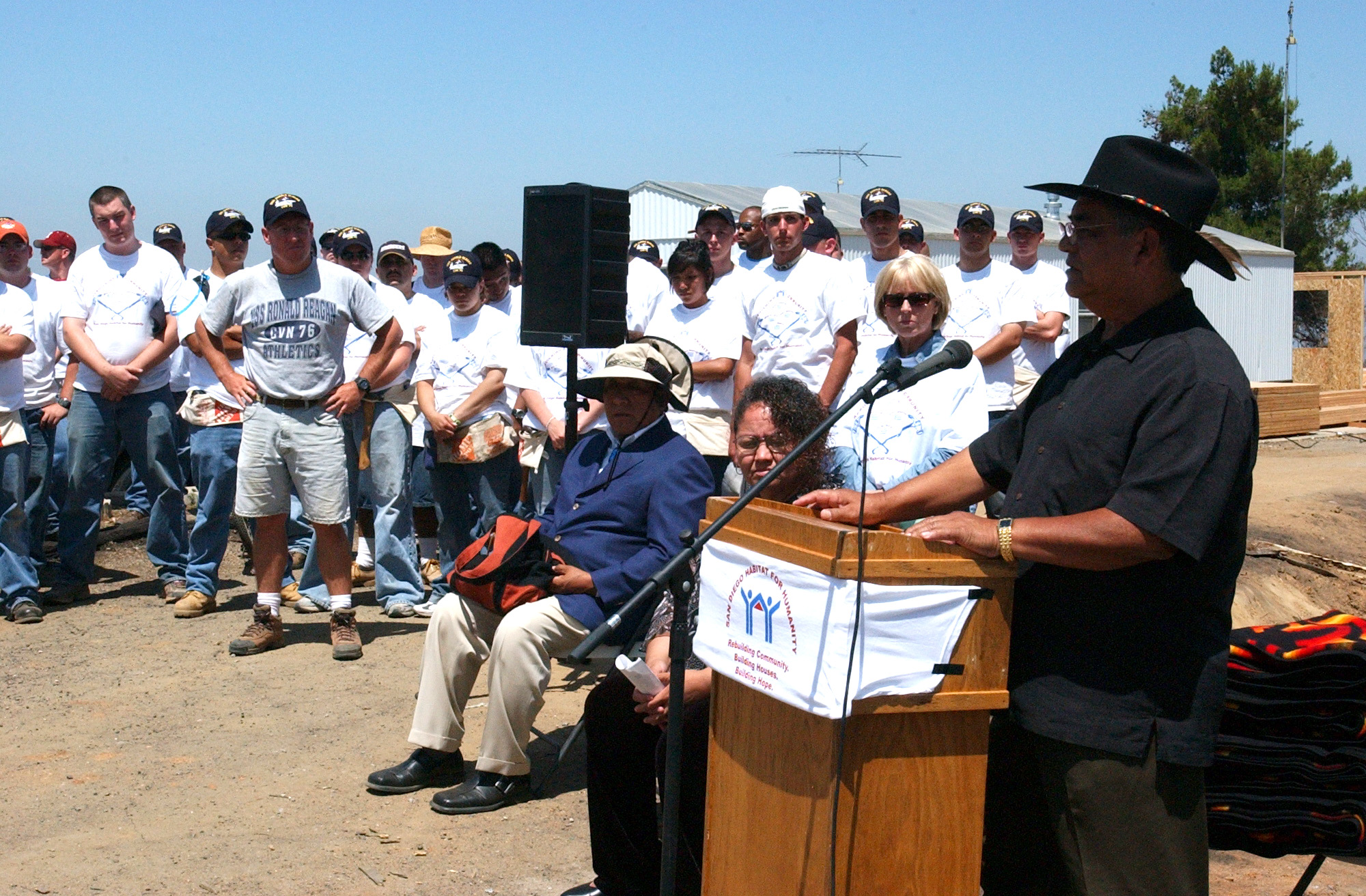
San Pasqual Tribal Chairman Allen Lawson introduces a Habitat for Humanity project on the reservation, 2004

The San Pasqual Reservation (33°12′41″N 116°57′40″W) is a federal reservation, located in northeastern San Diego County, California, near Valley Center. It is made up of five, non-contiguous parcels of land that total 1,379.58 acres (5.5830 km^{2}). The original reservation, founded in 1910, is now the San Diego Zoo Safari Park and Lake Wolford. Reservation population is approximately 752, and 435 tribal members live in the general area. 21 people of 214 enrolled members lived there in the 1970s.

=== Demographics ===
San Pasqual Reservation, California – Racial and ethnic composition Note: the US Census treats Hispanic/Latino as an ethnic category. This table excludes Latinos from the racial categories and assigns them to a separate category. Hispanics/Latinos may be of any race.
Race / Ethnicity (NH = Non-Hispanic)	Pop 2000	Pop 2010	Pop 2020	% 2000	% 2010	% 2020
White alone (NH)	91	150	95	12.10%	13.67%	7.61%
Black or African American alone (NH)	1	0	6	0.13%	0.00%	0.48%
Native American or Alaska Native alone (NH)	266	397	612	35.37%	36.19%	49.00%
Asian alone (NH)	0	4	4	0.00%	0.36%	0.32%
Native Hawaiian or Pacific Islander alone (NH)	5	0	0	0.66%	0.00%	0.00%
Other race alone (NH)	2	0	6	0.27%	0.00%	0.48%
Mixed race or Multiracial (NH)	49	47	56	6.52%	4.28%	4.48%
Hispanic or Latino (any race)	338	499	470	44.95%	45.49%	37.63%
Total	752	1,097	1,249	100.00%	100.00%	100.00%

== History ==
=== San Pasqual Pueblo ===
As part of ending the mission system in Alta California under territorial governor José Figueroa, Pueblos were created to resettle the displaced Mission Kumeyaay, of which some of the Kumeyaay from Mission San Diego were allowed to resettle and establish San Pasqual Pueblo in 1835. The pueblo became a flourishing agricultural village under Jose Pedro Panto, the "captain" of the band.

Its strategic positioning also served as a barrier against hostile attacks from other bands. They partnered with Mexican ranchers, and protected ranchers from other bands. In 1837, the Pueblo fought against hostile bands and protected Mexican settlers, with a decisive victory over an anti-Christian uprising and capturing its leader, Claudio.

==== Mexican–American War ====
During the Mexican–American War, the most Kumeyaay were initially neutral. As American forces approached the San Pasqual, the Kumeyaay of the pueblo evacuated. The Mexicans and the Californios were victorious over the Americans at the Battle of San Pasqual. The leader of the Pueblo, Panto, called on the Mexicans to cease hostilities with the Americans so that the Kumeyaay could tend to the wounded Americans, to which provided Panto and the San Pasqual Kumeyaay resupplied the Americans and helped ensure the American capture of the Pueblo de Los Ángeles and San Diego.

==== Yuma War ====
In 1851, San Diego County unilaterally charged property taxes on Native American tribes in the county and threatened to confiscate land and property should they fail to pay up. This led to the San Diego Tax Rebellion of 1851 or "Garra's Revolt", the San Diego theatre of the Yuma War. While many Kumeyaay fought against the County, the San Pasqual Band of Kumeyaay sided with the Americans and fought against the Quechan campaign to attack San Diego, defeating the Quechan in the San Pasqual Valley.

Following the Yuma War, many squatters and homesteaders started pouring into San Pasqual Valley. Panto sought to mitigate the influx of settlers and worked with local officials to enforce their boundaries, providing Mexican documents supporting their claim to the land. Panto was held in such high esteem, that local White American settlers published an article on the San Diego Herald calling on Indian Affairs agents to designate Panto as the nominal "Captain General of the Dieguenos", hoping to manipulate the power dynamics among the Kumeyaay leaders.

Panto sought to plead their case in Washington DC, but was killed on April 27, 1874 when he was thrown off his horse. Following Panto's death. The Pueblo succumbed to European American settlement, and the band was expelled from the valley in 1878, forcing the members of the band to seek refuge in other reservations and sought employment from the American settlers. Many members of the band became homesteaders themselves and filed homestead claims in the San Pasqual Valley.

=== Federally recognized reservation ===
Following an investigation of the San Pasqual homestead claims, the federal government decided to consolidate their homesteads into a single reservation for the band. However, Cave Couts Jr., a surveyor, unintentionally designated the reservation one township to the north of the intended reservation, amidst the rugged hills that overlooked Lake Wohlford. The land received official patent in 1910 and was duly granted to the band.

After, the Barona Group of the Capitan Grande Band of Mission Indians v. Duffy (1982) decision, the band built the Valley View Casino in 2001. Between 2010 and 2018, the Valley View Casino bought the naming rights to Pechanga Arena, which was named Valley View Casino Center during that period.

== Government ==
The San Pasqual Band is headquartered in Valley Center, California. They are governed by a democratically elected tribal council. Stephen Cope is their current tribal chairperson.

== Economic development ==
The tribe owns and operates the Valley View Casino, Black and Blue Steakhouse, Patties & Pints, The Buffet, The Cafe, Corner Market, Snax, Stix, Mainstage Bar, and Sweets pastry shop, all located in Valley View. The tribe also maintains and owns the Woods Valley Golf Course, Horizon Fuel Center, and Ziggy's coffee shop as enterprises of San Pasqual.

== Education ==
The reservation is served by the Valley Center-Pauma Unified School District and the Escondido Union High School District.
