= Wiiwish =

Indigenous Southern Californian Meal made of Ground Acorns

Wiiwish, also known as shawii, acorn mush, was one of the main food staples of the indigenous peoples of California. Acorns were gathered in the fall before the rain came. To harvest the acorns, Californian Natives would crack open the shell and pull out the inner part of the acorn. This part of the acorn was then smashed with a mortar and pestle until it was a flour-like consistency. This flour-like substance was then leached several times with water until the acorn mush was no longer bitter (this also indicated that the mush was safe for consumption). This mush was then cooked in a waterproof basket with hot rocks and then served. California Indians continue to eat wiiwish both the traditional way and with alterations. These alterations include using other tools to grind down the acorns such as a coffee grinder or/and adding sugar or other seasonings to the finished wiiwish.

Shawii is the name of the mush of acorn that was eaten daily by Kumeyaay.
