= Kumeyaay astronomy =

Astronomical knowledge of Kumeyaay people

- Geographical range: El Vallecito
- Period: 7000 BCE - c. 1875

Kumeyaay astronomy or cosmology (Kumeyaay: My Uuyow, "sky knowledge") comprises the astronomical knowledge of the Kumeyaay people, a Native American group whose traditional homeland occupies what is now Southern California in the United States and adjacent parts of northern Baja California in Mexico. A deeply rooted cosmological belief system was developed and followed by the Kumeyaay civilization based on this knowledge including the computing of time (Kumeyaay Mat’taam).

The first evidence of astronomical observations and visual registration was discovered in the El Vallecito archeological zone. The "Men in a square" rupestric painting located at El Diablito area of El Vallecito depicted a square that aligns with sunlight on the Fall equinox. These paintings were made by the Kumeyaay people, possibly during nomadic travels. Kumeyaay sand paintings and rock art modeled the passage of the sun, moon, and constellations.

Observation areas were made by the Kumeyaay to watch and register astronomical events. However many were destroyed by vandals before protection measures were instituted.

== Astronomical objects ==
- Hatotkeur (Spine of the Sky) – Milky Way

Constellations:

Name	Meaning	Western equivalent
Kwechnyay	Hunter	part of Orion
Hachaa	Six laughing girls	Pleiades
Hawitai	Garter snake	Lyra
Akewli	Chaser	part of Orion
Hechkullk	Wolf	Auriga, Taurus
Shallymat	Arm	Big Dipper
Shally	Hand	Leo
Pehkay	Seven	Cygnus
Llykuushirra	Racer snake	Cassiopaeia
Menniih	Tarantula	Canis Major/Minor
Namuuly	Bear	Gemini
'Ehwii	Rattlesnake	Draco
Shuluk	Lightning	Scorpius
Hetepaa	Coyote	Bootes
Shaaii	Buzzard	Virgo
'Ahaak	Raven	Aquila
Emuu	Mountain sheep	Orion's Belt
Awi yuk	Gopher snake	Corvus/Hydra
Nyemii	Bobcat	Piscis Austrinus

== See also ==
- Cultural astronomy
