= Julian Union School District =

School district in California, United States

Address
- 1704 Cape Horn Julian, California, 92036; United States

District information
- Type: Public
- Grades: K–12
- NCES District ID: 0619140

Students and staff
- Students: 266 (2020–2021)
- Teachers: 12.55 (FTE)
- Staff: 17.88 (FTE)
- Student–teacher ratio: 21.2:1

Other information
- Website: juesd.net

Julian Union Elementary School District is a public school district based in San Diego County, California, United States.
