= Chiquito Peak =

Mountain in California, United States

- Location within California Location within the United States

Highest point
- Elevation: 4,167 ft (1,270 m) NAVD 88
- Prominence: 605 ft (184 m)
- Coordinates: 32°51′04″N 116°38′43″W

Geography
- Location: San Diego County, California, U.S.
- Parent range: Cuyamaca Mountains
- Topo map: USGS Viejas Mountain

Chiquito Peak is a summit in the Cuyamaca Mountains of San Diego County, California, United States. It located north of Interstate 8 and about 1.7 miles (2.7 km) west of Descanso.
