= Ipai language =

Yuman language spoken in California, US

Ipay
- ʼIipay aa
- Native to: United States
- Region: San Diego County, California
- Ethnicity: Kumeyaay
- Native speakers: 6 (2007)
- Language family: Yuman–Cochimí: Core Yuman; Delta–California; Ipay

Language codes
- ISO 639-3: dih (as part of Diegueño)
- Glottolog: ipai1240
- Ipai is classified as Critically Endangered by the UNESCO Atlas of the World's Languages in Danger.

Ipai, also spelled ʼIipay and also known as Northern Diegueño, is the Native American language spoken by the Kumeyaay people of central San Diego County, California. Professor Leanne Hinton suggested a conservative estimate of 25 surviving Ipai speakers.

Ipai belongs to the Yuman language family and to the Delta–California branch of that family. Ipai and its neighbors to the south, Kumeyaay and Tipai, were often considered to be dialects of a single Diegueño language, but the current consensus among linguists seem to be that at least three distinct languages are present within the dialect chain (e.g., Langdon 1990). Confusingly, Kumeyaay is commonly used as a designation both for the central language in this family and for the Ipai-Kumeyaay-Tipai people as a whole.

Published documentation for the Ipai language includes reference and teaching grammars, a dictionary, and several texts (cf. Mithun 1999:578).

There is no standardized orthography for Ipai.

== Documentation ==
A language revitalization effort for Santa Ysabel ʼIipay Aa is underway as of 2023. Classes are available through Kumeyaay Community College paired with Cuyamaca Community College.

== Phonology ==
=== Consonants ===
		Bilabial	Dental	Alveolar	Palatal	Velar		Uvular	Glottal
		Bilabial	Dental	Alveolar	Palatal	nor.	lab.	Uvular	Glottal
Stop/Affricate		p	t̪	t	tʃ	k	kʷ	q	ʔ
Fricative		β	s̪	s		x	xʷ		
Nasal		m	n̪	n	ɲ				
Trill			r̪	r					
Lateral	fricative			ɬ	𝼆				
Lateral	approx.			l	ʎ				
Approximant					j		w		

Alveolar sounds /t, s, n, r/ can also be heard as post-alveolar [t̠, s̠, n̠, r̠].

=== Vowels ===
	Front	Central	Back
Close	i		u
Mid		ə	o
Open		a	

Vowel length may also be distributed.

== Grammar ==
=== Verbs ===
Verb stems are formed by affixing stem-forming morphemes. Most verb stems are formed by adding a variety of prefixes to the root. The meaning of these prefixes fall mostly in the category of instrumentals and causatives

==== Personal prefixes ====
Personal prefixes attach to verbs to mark the subject and object. These prefixes do not distinguish gender and number::

Personal prefixes in the Mesa Grande dialect
prefix	meaning	notes
’-	'I ... (him)'	
m-	'you ... (him)', 'he ... you'	
k-	'you ... (him)', 'he ... you'	additionally, shortening of the stressed vowel of the root if it is stem final
w-	'you! .. (him)'	prefixed to free root stems with initial vowel and to bound root stems
ny-	'I ... you', 'he ... me'	
’nym-	'you ... me'	
’nyk-	'you! ... me'	additionally, shortening of the stressed vowel of the root if it is stem final

==== Verb affixes ====
In the Mesa Grande dialect, the affixes that attach to verbs are as follows:

- t- marks the progressive aspect
- p- gives the verb a demonstrative meaning
- pa- gives the verb the meaning of 'there'
- -x marks the future tense

==== Structure of verb forms ====
The structure of verb forms can be summarized as follows:

aspectual prefix +	personal prefix(es) +	verb stem +	future -x

=== Pronouns ===
Personal pronouns only exist for first and second person:

Personal pronouns in the Mesa Grande dialect
	1st person	2nd person
singular	’ənya	ma
plural	’ənyawup	məwup

Another personal pronoun is nyamat 'all', which can combine with other personal pronouns to form ’ənyamat 'we all' and mənyamat 'we all'.

The interrogative pronouns in the Mesa Grande dialect are maap 'who' and ’uch 'what'.
