= Kumeyaay language =

Yuman language spoken in California and Mexico

Kumeyaay
- Southern Diegueño
- Native to: United States, Mexico
- Region: California, Baja California
- Ethnicity: Kumeyaay
- Native speakers: 40–50 Kumeyaay in the United States (2020) (assuming all Diegueño in Mexico are Tiipai)
- Language family: Yuman: Core Yuman; Delta–California; Kumeyaay
- Dialects: unclassified Kamia may have been a dialect

Language codes
- ISO 639-3: dih (as part of Diegueño)
- Glottolog: kumi1248 Tipai
- ELP: Kumeyaay

A man singing a song in Kumeyaay, then explaining the meaning in Spanish.

Kumeyaay (Kumiai), more precisely known as Central Diegueño or Campo, is the Native American language spoken by the Kumeyaay people of southern San Diego and Imperial counties in California.

Hinton in 1994 suggested a conservative estimate of 50 native speakers of Kumeyaay.

Kumeyaay belongs to the Yuman language family and to the Delta–California branch of that family. Kumeyaay and its neighbors, ʼIipay to the north and Tiipay to the south, were often considered to be dialects of a single Diegueño language, but the 1990 consensus among linguists seems to be that at least three distinct languages are present within the dialect chain.

Confusingly, Kumeyaay is commonly used as a designation both for the central language of this family and for the ʼIipay-Tiipay-Kumeyaay people as a whole. Tiipay is also commonly used as a collective designation for speakers of both Kumeyaay and Tiipay proper.

== Documentation ==
In 1999, published documentation for the Kumeyaay language appeared to be limited to a few texts. In 2019, Margaret Field (along with other translators and native speakers) published a trilingual book of stories and oral histories from Baja California Tiipay communities of Nejí and La Huerta.

The Yuman language family is complex and contains various languages and further dialects. The modern-day U.S. Mexico border has split Indigenous communities, which leads to further language classification issues. Margaret Field's work in Kumeyaay Language Variation, Group Identity, and The Land helps clarify possible questions.

Video and audio recordings of stories, conversation, and wordlists in the Tiipay variants spoken in Nejí and La Huerta have been uploaded to the Archive of the Indigenous Languages of Latin America (AILLA). Some of these have been transcribed and are available to download on the Endangered Languages Archive hosted by the Endangered Languages Documentation Program (ELDP) at the University of London.

== Grammar Research ==
Margaret Langdon studied under Mary Haas at the University of California, Berkeley, and earned her PhD in 1966. She published numerous works on the Kumeyaay language, including its first grammar. Much of her work is used today in the writing structure of Kumeyaay. The California Language Archive has a page on Kumeyaay with a subsection on grammatical information. Grammatical information is a detailed description of the structures and functions of Kumeyaay.

== Language and Culture ==
Preserving the Kumeyaay language is a critical element in the survival of their Indigenous culture. An important form of preservation is through oral tradition, through stories and songs. Examples include bird songs, lightning songs, wildcat songs, and many others. From Kumeyaay Oral Tradition, Cultural Identity, and Language Revitalization, “Respected Kumeyaay elders and educators Hank and Shirley Murphy, long time advocates of historic preservation and tradition, are essential to the importance of information sharing and the importance of the media in communicating to the world the significant role that the tribal community plays in creating a healthy balance and moral clarity of the outside world.” Kumeyaay has a strong community around linguistic effects as well as other forms of cultural survivance. Leaders are looking for a balance of oral tradition and forms such as media to keep their culture alive. Will move from documentation subheading. As of April 2023, classes are available through Kumeyaay Community College paired with Cuyamaca Community College as well as San Diego State University. There is also a Kumeyaay language immersion program.

== Phonology ==
=== Consonants ===
		Bilabial	Dental	Alveolar	Palatal	Velar		Uvular	Glottal
		Bilabial	Dental	Alveolar	Palatal	nor.	lab.	Uvular	Glottal
Stop/Affricate		p	t̪	t	tʃ	k	kʷ	q	ʔ
Fricative		β	s̪	s		x	xʷ		
Nasal		m	n̪	n	ɲ				
Trill			r̪	r					
Lateral	fricative			ɬ	𝼆				
Lateral	approx.			l	ʎ				
Approximant					j		w		

Alveolar sounds /t, s, n, r/ can also be heard as post-alveolar [t̠, s̠, n̠, r̠].

=== Vowels ===
	Front	Central	Back
Close	i		u
Mid		ə	o
Open		a	

Vowel length may also be distributed.
