= Monqui language =

Extinct language

Monqui
- Monquí-Didiú
- Native to: Mexico
- Region: Baja California Sur
- Ethnicity: Monqui
- Extinct: (date missing)
- Language family: Yuman–Cochimí ?: Cochimí ?; Nebé ?; Monqui

Language codes
- ISO 639-3: None (mis)
- Glottolog: monq1236
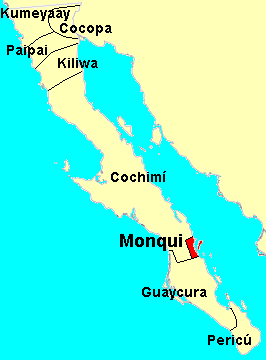

The Monqui language is an extinct language formerly spoken in the Mexican state of Baja California Sur. Of it, only 14 place names, 11 words, and one sentence survive and the characteristics and relationships of Monqui to other languages cannot be determined with any precision.

== Documentation ==
A grammar of Monqui was compiled by the Jesuit Juan María de Salvatierra in the 1680s, but it has been lost. Otherwise, a total of 11 possibly Monqui words and a sentence survive from the language in the documents of Francisco María Píccolo who had served in Monqui territory and wrote about the language, del Barco, and Venagas.

== Geographical distribution ==
Monqui was spoken around the area of Loreto, Baja California Sur.

== Classification ==
The Baja California peninsula is a geographic cul-de-sac and the languages in the southernmost part of the peninsula (Pericu, Guaycura and, possibly, Monqui) have no known relatives. Some linguists have speculated that these people and languages date back thousands of years and that they may be the direct descendants of the earliest inhabitants in the Americas. This speculation is reinforced by their physical characteristic of dolichocephalic crania (longheadedness) which is unusual among present-day American Indians. Miguel Venegas (1944) reported that the Didiu people spoke a language related to that of the Monqui.

Despite Jesuit missionary Eusebio Francisco Kino's chronicles about missionaries' skills to spoken Monqui and no mentions about isolation to Cochimí, expelled Jesuit missionary Francis Bennon Ducrue also claimed in a letter links between Laymon (Cochimí) and Monqui but spoken "with a significant difference just from second and third mission" to the north in whole Baja California peninsula from San Javier Mission and the confirmation of missionaries' uncare to make some dictionary for Cochimí due they ever wanted create an universal one. The next mission from the south is Mission Loreto, present-day the only one on the ancient Monqui territory and thus, strong evidence of this language as a Cochimí dialect.

William C. Massey (1949) believed that the Monqui spoke a Cochimí language or dialect. Cochimi is remotely related to the Yuman languages spoken in the northern part of the Baja California peninsula. A recent reassessment of the historical evidence suggests instead that the Monqui language was distinctive and non-Cochimí, possibly related to that of the Guaycura to the south.

== Phonology ==
=== Consonants ===
From the available data, the following "phonetic consonant array" can be identified according to David Shaul (2020):

		Labial	Alveolar	Palatal	Velar
Plosive	voiceless		t		k
Plosive	voiced	b	d		
Nasal		m	n	ñ	
Fricative				(š)	(x)
Approximant		w		y	

Raoul Zamponi (2025), however, includes a voiced stop [g], as evidenced by the placename Ligguí~Liguí~Liggüí~Liguig and possibly Nautrig~Notrí, a lateral ⟨l⟩, and a sound he describes as "a rhotic or some sort of voiceless stop", which he notes is further absent from Waikuri, written as ⟨r⟩ or ⟨tr⟩.

=== Vowels ===
Five vowels are interpreted for Monqui, [i e u o a].

=== Phonotactics ===
Known syllable shapes in Monqui include CV and CVC.

=== Stress ===
According to Shaul (2020), "[s]tress appears on the last syllable of the head word of a phrase, and the segment (consonant or vowel) which is to the left of stress lengthens."

== Vocabulary ==
The 11 words of Monqui are presented below:

gloss	Monqui
cardon cactus	camamaahua
amaranth	etudà
agave	medese
plant with edible bean (Note: refers to a leguminous tree; "in alll probability a mesquite")	macabà
father	nammà (Note: possibly a vocative form)
cloud	tejui
palo verde	dipuá
bighorn sheep	tayé, tayè
shaman	dicuinocho
above, high	notù (Note: "also used to refer to the sky")
boat	pùa

Only five of the 11 words are comparable with Waikuri and/or Cochimi:

gloss	Monqui	Waikuri	Cochimi
above	notù	aëna	–
agave	medese	kenjei, kennei	–
amaranth	etudà	–	teda
father	nammà	-dáre ~ -áre	kaʔay
plant with edible bean	macabà	–	-xa 'mesquite'

== Sample text ==
A single sentence of Monqui has survived in the documents of Piccolo. It reads Taxamà coñit mulas huala endetcù, and glossed approximately as 'The boys had not thrown (stones) at the mules, the devil had done it'. The sentence is analyzed by Shaul (2020) as follows:

Taxama conit mulas huala endetcu
taxama/tasama ko-ni-t mulas wala endetku
throw ?-not(?)-PERF(?) mulas DEM(?) boys
'the mules have not thrown the boys'

Thus, Monqui would have verb–subject–object word order. However, Zamponi (2025) does not believe the sentence to be analyzable, and claims that it "does not contain morphemes that may be convincingly connected to Waikuri or Cochimí elements".
