= José Antonio Mijares =

José Antonio Mijares (c. 1819–1847) was a Mexican Army Lieutenant who led the Mexican resistance force against the American garrison of San José del Cabo in the Battle of San José del Cabo where he was killed leading the assault.

== Early life ==
Jose Antonio Mijares was born in Santander, Spain, and came to Mexico City, and became a citizen of Mexico. He joined the Mexican Navy in 1842 and participated in the Naval Battle of Campeche, becoming a Lieutenant. Following the Texas Revolution, Mijares retired from the navy and married Dolores Aviles in June 1847.

== Mexican–American War and death ==
The looming outbreak of the Mexican–American War prompted him to join the Mexican Army. As a Lieutenant, he was sent to Baja California Sur, joining the command of Captain Manuel Pineda Munoz, who had defeated a U. S. Navy attempt to capture Mulege in the Battle of Mulege and was moving south to attack American forces in La Paz.

Pineda sent Lt. Mijares and bajacalifornio guerrilla leader Jose Matias Moreno with about 100 men to San José del Cabo, where the U. S. Navy Commodore William Shubrick had left a garrison of four passed midshipmen and twenty marines, and twenty friendly bajacalifornios from the town, along with a 9-pound carronade under Lieutenant Charles Heywood.

Upon reaching San José del Cabo on November 19, 1847 the force offered terms of surrender to Lt. Heywood, which were refused. The next night, the Mexicans launched their assault on the American positions in the town. Heywood's force barricaded in the priests house (nowadays the site of the Casa de la Cultura) and the surrounding houses. Mijares moved forward with a forlorn hope to seize the piece of artillery and distract the defenders from the main assault on the walls. In the attack, Lt. Mijares was severely wounded and his men seeing him fall, the attack faltered, and they were repulsed. Lt. Mijares died the next day.

Mexico considers Lieutenant Mijares a hero and have a monument to him on the main street of San José del Cabo, called Boulevard Antonio Mijares.
