= Charles Heywood (disambiguation) =

Charles Heywood may refer to:

- Charles Heywood (1839–1915), Marine commandant
- Charles Heywood (1803–1853), his father, U.S. Navy lieutenant
- Charles D. Heywood (1881–1957), U.S. politician
- Charles Heywood (baseball), Negro leagues baseball player

== See also ==
- Charles Hayward (disambiguation)
