= Charles Hayward =

Charles Hayward may refer to:

- Sir Charles Hayward (politician) (1839–1919), mayor of Victoria, British Columbia, Canada
- Sir Charles William Hayward (1892–1983), British entrepreneur and philanthropist
- Charles Hayward (cricketer) (1867–1934), Australian cricketer
- Charles Hayward (drummer) (born 1951), British drummer
- Charles H. Hayward (1898–1998), British cabinet maker and author
- C. T. R. Hayward (Charles Thomas Robert Hayward; born 1948), British academic
- Charlie Hayward (born 1949), bass guitarist with the Charlie Daniels Band
- Chuck Hayward (1920–1998), American stuntman and actor

== See also ==
- Charles Heywood (disambiguation)
