= Pericú language =

Extinct language of Baja California Sur, Mexico

Pericú
- Native to: Mexico
- Region: Baja California Sur
- Ethnicity: Pericú
- Extinct: before 1800
- Language family: unclassified

Language codes
- ISO 639-3: None (mis)
- Glottolog: peri1250
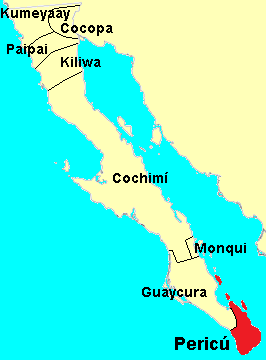
- Pericú was spoken to the south and east of Guaycura

Pericú is the extinct and essentially unattested language of the Pericú people who lived at the southern tip of Baja California Sur. Jesuit missionaries recognized it as distinct from Waikuri (Guaycura) immediately to the north. It was spoken in the mountainous area around the mission of San José del Cabo, on the southeastern coast from Santiago to La Paz, and on the islands off the east coast as far north as Isla San José.

Data is extremely limited, amounting to only four words and ten place names.

== Classification ==
Massey (1949) suggested a connection with Waikuri. However, with the benefit of several decades of subsequent research, Laylander (1997) and Zamponi (2004) conclude that the languages were unrelated.

The Pericú may have shared with the Waikuri distinctive physical characteristics such as small bodies and dolichocephalic crania (long-headedness). Those physical characteristics set them apart from most other Native Americans and are consistent with the theory that they were an ancient people and their language was a language isolate of ancient origin.

== Vocabulary ==
Attested words in Pericú given by Zamponi (2004):

- minyikári 'sky'
- unóa 'give' (3SG.IMP)
- utére 'sit'

The ethnonym Waikuri and its variants likely originates from the Pericú word guaxoro 'friend'. Variations of the name include Waicuri, Guaicuri, Waicura, Guaycura, Guaicura, Waicuro, Guaicuro, Guaycuro, Vaicuro, Guaicuru, Guaycuru, Waikur.

== Toponyms ==
Attested toponyms are:

- Aiñiní: the location of the Misión Santiago de Los Coras
- Anica: a Pericú settlement
- Añuití: the location of the Mission San José del Cabo (near San José del Cabo)
- Caduaño: a location in the modern city of Los Cabos; means 'green arroyo'
- Cayuco
- Cunimniici: a mountain range
- Eguí
- Marino: the Santa Ana Mountains
- Purum: a group of mountains and a Pericú settlement
- Yeneca: a Pericú settlement
- Yenecamu: Cabo San Lucas

== Bibliography ==
- Golla, Victor. 2011. California Indian Languages.
- Laylander, Don. 1997. "The linguistic prehistory of Baja California". In Contributions to the Linguistic Prehistory of Central and Baja California, edited by Gary S. Breschini and Trudy Haversat, pp. 1–94. Coyote Press, Salinas, California.
- Massey, William C. 1949. "Tribes and languages of Baja California". Southwestern Journal of Anthropology 5:272-307.
- Zamponi, Raoul. 2004. "Fragments of Waikuri (Baja California)". Anthropological Linguistics 46:156-193.
