= Mission San Luis Gonzaga =

Mission San Luis Gonzaga may refer to:

- Mission San Luis Gonzága de Bacadéhuachi, Sonora
- Misión San Luis Gonzaga Chiriyaqui, Baja California Sur
