= Misión Santiago de Los Coras =

18th-century Spanish mission in Baja California Sur, Mexico

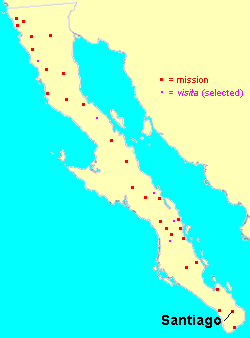

Mission Santiago was founded by the Italian Jesuit Ignacio María Nápoli in 1724 and financed by the Marqués de Villapuente de la Peña and his wife the Marquesa de las Torres de Rada, at the native settlement of Aiñiní, about 40 kilometers north of San José del Cabo in the Cape Region of Baja California Sur, Mexico.

The mission took part of its name from the "Coras," the native people of the region. William C. Massey (1949) interpreted the Jesuit historical sources as indicating that the Coras were a Guaycura-speaking group, but a reexamination of the evidence favors the view that the name was a synonym for "Pericú".

Mission Santiago was the first target of the Pericú Revolt in 1734. Its missionary, Lorenzo José Carranco, was killed, and the buildings were sacked. Rebuilding was begun in 1734.

Ignacio Tirsch, a Bohemian Jesuit, served as resident missionary from 1763 to 1768.

The mission was ultimately abandoned during the Dominican period in 1795, and its remaining neophytes were relocated to San José del Cabo.

== See also ==
- Missions in Baja California Sur
- List of Jesuit sites
