= Kwatl language =

Yuman language spoken in Baja California

Kwatl
- Koʼalh
- Native to: Mexico
- Region: Baja California
- Ethnicity: Kumeyaay
- Native speakers: 2 (2025)
- Language family: Yuman–Cochimí: Core Yuman; Delta–California; Kwatl

Language codes
- ISO 639-3: None (mis)
- Glottolog: kwat1246 Kwatl

Kwatl, also known as Koʼalh, is a Yuman language spoken by the Kumeyaay people in Baja California. It was once considered a dialect of Tiipay. Speakers live in the Paipai community of Santa Catarina. Only two people speak Kwatl.
