= Guaycura people =

Indigenous people of Baja California

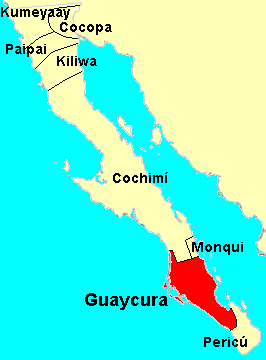
Historical location in Baja California

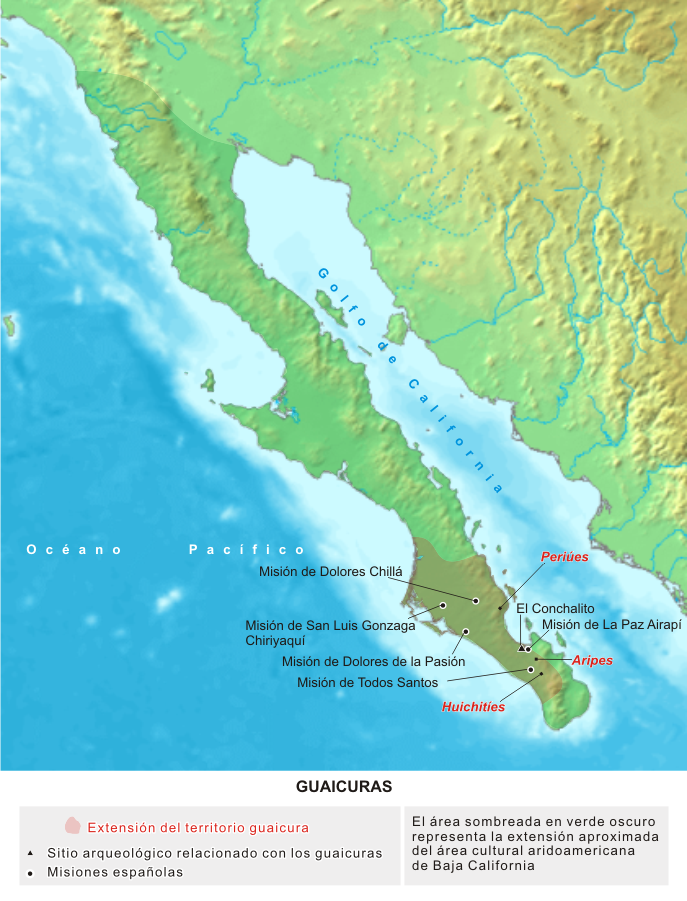
Missions in the Guaycura territory

The Guaycura (Waicura, Waikuri, Guaycuri) were a native people of Baja California Sur, Mexico, occupying an area extending south from near Loreto to Todos Santos. They contested the area around La Paz with the Pericú. The Guaycura were nomadic hunter-gatherers. They are distinguished by a language unrelated to any other Native American language, indicating in the opinion of some linguists that their ancestry in Baja California dates back thousands of years.

The Society of Jesus (Jesuits) of the Catholic Church established Christian missions in their territory in the 18th century. The Guaycura may have numbered 5,000 at the time of Spanish contact, but their numbers quickly declined, mostly due to European diseases. They became extinct as a culture by about 1800, the survivors being absorbed into the mestizo society of Mexico.

== Prehistory ==
Linguists and archaeologists speculate that the Guaycura and the Pericú occupying the southern tip of the Baja California peninsula may have been the descendants of very early Native American migrants to the Americas. Their languages apparently were not related to each other or any other languages and their physical type was uncommon among Native Americans. They were small-bodied and long-headed (dolichocephalic). Their geographical location was a cul-de-sac in which they may have been isolated from extensive interaction with other peoples. Thus, their unique languages and physical characteristics may have survived for thousands of years. The lack of relationships between Guaycura and other languages indicates that Guaycura may have developed in isolation over a period of at least 5,000 years. At one time the Guaycura and Pericú may have occupied much greater territories but they were pushed southward and isolated by the expansion of the Cochimí people who spoke a language in the Yuman-Cochimí language family.

There is no evidence that the Guaycura were ever united politically, but rather consisted of a large number of independent bands, each with their own territory and sometimes hostile to each other. Known band names of probable Guaycura speakers living near the Bay of La Paz are Cubí (or Cora), Huchiti (or Uchiti), Aripe, Callejué, (Note: Also spelled Callegué.) and Cantile. Most bands probably consisted of about 500 persons. The Monqui also possibly spoke a Guaycura language or dialect. The Guaycura occupied a territory of about 25,000 square kilometres (9,700 sq mi) of austere deserts and mountains with few sources of fresh water.

== Culture and livelihood ==
The indigenous peoples of the 1,300 kilometres (810 mi) long peninsula of Baja California were similar in that all were hunter-gatherers with a limited and portable toolkit for survival. The Guaycura had no tribal government, but were divided into bands, each with its own territory. Bands united infrequently and most of the year the Guaycura foraged in family groups or lived in temporary settlements, called rancherias by the Spanish, of 50 to 200 people. Bands competed for territory and sometimes warred with each other. The Guaycura hunted mule deer, bighorn sheep and smaller game, harvested shellfish and turtles on the shorelines, and gathered a variety of plant foods. They had no pottery or agriculture and no domestic animals. Their shelters were made of brush; the men usually went naked, women wore a short skirt made of reeds or animal skins. Their religion was shamanic.

Year-round the most important food for the Guaycura was probably the basal rosettes of several species of agave which they roasted in a pit with heated rocks. The fruit of the organ pipe cactus or pitahaya (Stenocereus thurberi) was the staple food for two or three months in late summer and fall. Its abundance and ease of harvest enabled the Guaycura to congregate in larger numbers than usual for social and religious activities.

A fair number of explorers and missionaries left brief ethnographic notes concerning the Guaycura. The most detained accounts were written by the Alsatian Jesuit Johann Jakob Baegert, stationed at San Luis Gonzaga mission between 1751 and 1768 (Baegert 1772, 1952, 1982). Baegert took a decidedly sour view of his charges, at one point characterizing them as "stupid, awkward, rude, unclean, insolent, ungrateful, mendacious, thievish, abominably lazy, great talkers to their end, and naïve and childish." His views as to the extreme simplicity of Guaycura social organization and belief systems have often been accepted as factual, but they may owe something to the missionary's own acerbic personality. He was scarcely kinder to European critics of the Jesuits. As one scholar said, "Products of their own self-righteousness and conceit, the Jesuits learned little...about the Indians."

== The Jesuits ==
The Guaycura may have come into contact with the Spanish near the present-day city of La Paz as early as the 1530s. Over the following century and a half, they had sporadic encounters with maritime expeditions and failed attempts by the Spanish to establish a colony and a Christian mission in Baja California. Pearl fishermen also likely visited the shores where they lived. In 1697, the Jesuits established the Misión de Nuestra Señora de Loreto Conchó mission near present day Loreto, Baja California Sur among the Monqui people who possibly spoke a Guaycura language. The first mission the Jesuits established among the Guaycura was the Misión de Nuestra Señora del Pilar de La Paz Airapí at present day La Paz in 1720. Missions subsequently established among the Guaycura were Dolores (1721), Todos Santos (1733), and Misión San Luis Gonzaga Chiriyaqui (1737).

The Guaycura were initially resistant to the missionary endeavors of the Jesuits. In 1716, the first attempt, led by Jesuit Juan María de Salvatierra, to establish a mission and a Spanish settlement among the Guaycura at La Paz resulted in the death of several Guaycura women at the hands of Indian followers of the Jesuits. The first Jesuit mission among the Guaycura was at La Paz and it was intended to serve not only as a missionary center, but as a rest and resupply stop for the Manila galleons returning from the Philippines. However, La Paz was a fractious area, contested by several Guaycura bands and the Pericú of southernmost Baja California. The mission, during its 30 years of existence "would serve more as a base for the unintentional destruction of the region's peoples than as a center for their evangelization." The long-running opposition to the Jesuit missions and presence terminated in the Pericúe revolt of 1734, in which several Jesuits and their followers and Spanish sailors were killed by the Pericú and Guaycura, especially the Uchití band. Meanwhile the Guaycura were being devastated by introduced European diseases such as measles and smallpox. In 1748, after many years of frustration, the Jesuits decided to concentrate the southern bands of the Guaycura into a single settlement at Misión Todos Santos. There, the Jesuits forcibly detained the Guaycura children at the mission and their parents and relatives "for love of the children remained pacified."

In 1768, the Spanish government expelled the Jesuits from Baja California. The new Spanish administration and newly arrived Franciscan missionaries forced the 746 survivors of the northern bands of the Guaycura to move south to Todos Santos. A year later more than 300 had died in a measles epidemic. Many of the Guaycura were still semi-nomadic and the efforts of the Franciscans to make of them toilers of the soil on mission lands was a failure as many ran away. By 1808 only 82 Guaycura were still resident at Todos Santos. Baja California by this time was being settled by Spanish and mestizo immigrants and the remaining Guaycura were being absorbed into the general population and had lost the remnants of their culture.

== Language and legacy ==
The Guaycura language is attested by a few texts, but the evidence is not enough to classify it. It is not closely related to other known languages. Several businesses in Baja California Sur preserve the name of the Guaycura

A few people self-identified as Guaycura were still alive in the late 19th century. In 1883, Dutch anthropologist Herman ten Kate met two full-blooded Guaycura in Todos Santos. Both had the dolichocephalic skulls associated with the Guayacura and Pericú. In 1892, French photographer Leon Diguet photographed Maria Ignacia Melina in Loreto, Baja California Sur. She claimed to be 85 years old and three-fourths Guaycura.

== Bibliography ==
- Baegert, Johann Jakob. 1772. Nachrichten von der Amerikanischen Halbinsel Californien mit einem zweyfachen Anhand falscher Nachrichten. Churfürstl. Hof- und Academie-Buchdruckerey, Mannheim.
- Baegert, Johann Jakob. 1952. Observations in Lower California. University of California Press, Berkeley.
- Baegert, Johann Jakob. 1982. The Letters of Jacob Baegert 1749–1761, Jesuit Missionary in Baja California. Dawson's Book Shop, Los Angeles.
- Gursky, Karl-Heinz. 1966. "On the historical position of Waicura". International Journal of American Linguistics 32:41–45.
- Laylander, Don. 2000. Early Ethnography of the Californias: 1533–1825. Coyote Press, Salinas, California.
