= Charles Heywood =

United States Marine Corps general (1839–1915)

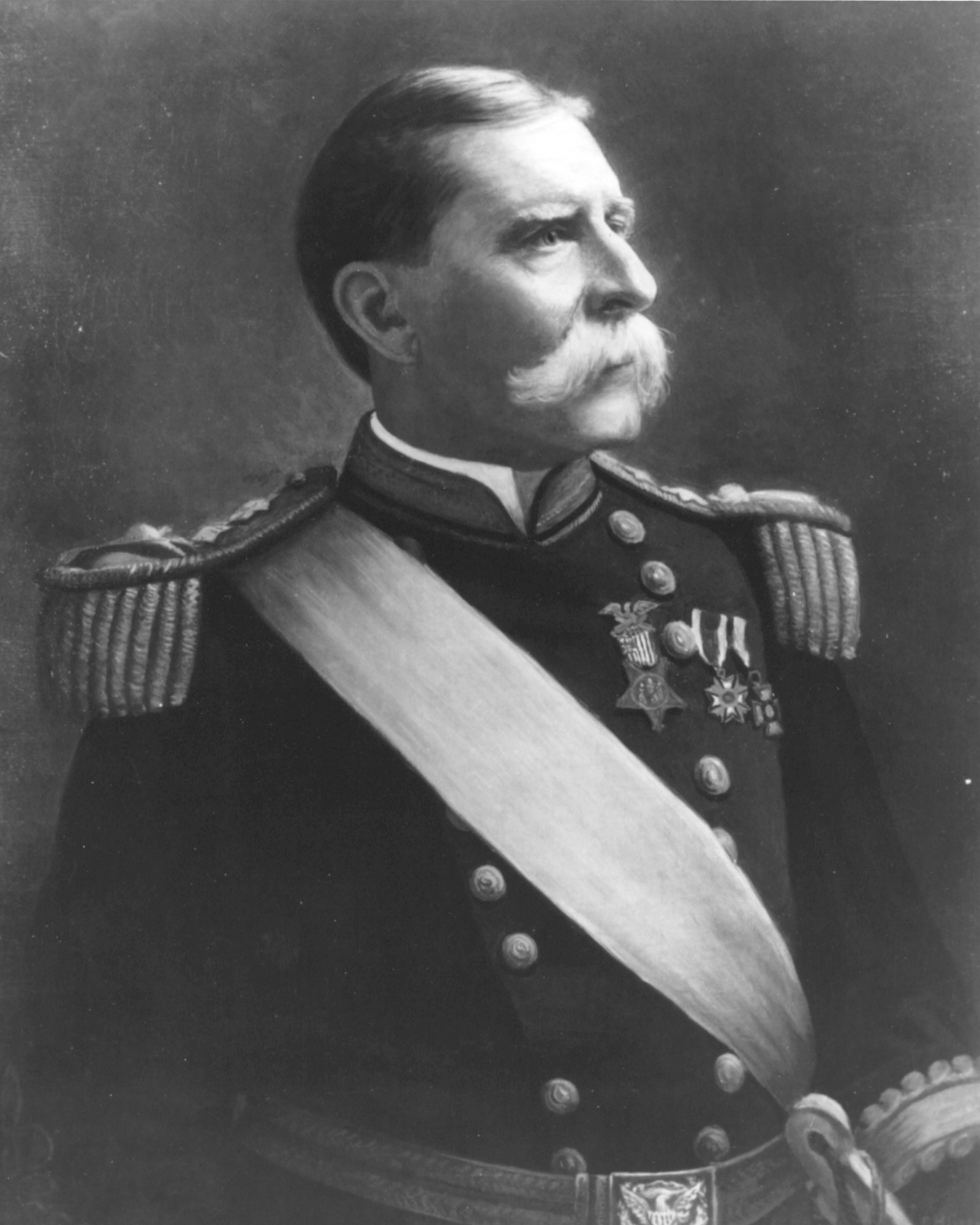
- 9th Commandant of the Marine Corps (1891–1903)
- Born: October 3, 1839; Waterville, Maine, U.S.
- Died: February 26, 1915 (aged 75); Washington, D.C., U.S.
- Burial place: Arlington National Cemetery
- Military career
- Allegiance: United States of America; Union
- Branch: United States Marine Corps
- Service years: 1858–1903
- Rank: Major general
- Nickname: "Boy Colonel"
- Commands: Commandant of the Marine Corps
- Conflicts: American Civil War; Spanish–American War

Signature
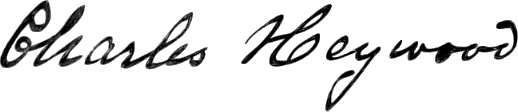

Major General Charles Heywood (October 3, 1839 – February 26, 1915) was the ninth Commandant of the Marine Corps. He served as an officer for over 45 years and was the first Marine to reach the rank of major general. During Heywood's term as Commandant, the size of the Corps more than tripled, from 2,175 Marines to 7,810 total.

== Biography ==
=== Early career ===
Charles Heywood was born on October 3, 1839, in Waterville, Maine, son of Charles Heywood, a lieutenant in the U. S. Navy, who had distinguished himself in the defense of San José del Cabo during the Mexican American War. He was appointed second lieutenant in the Marine Corps from New York, on April 5, 1858. During that year, he was stationed at the Marine Barracks, Washington, D.C., and at Brooklyn, New York.

While on duty in Brooklyn, he served in the 1858 quarantine riots at Staten Island, New York. He performed special duty on USS Niagara and later on board USS St. Louis, of the Home Squadron, the ship seeking filibusters in Central America.

He was invalided from Aspinwall (Colón), Panama, in January 1860, and later was ordered to the sloop of war USS Cumberland, flagship of the Squadron of Observation at Vera Cruz, Mexico.

In March 1861, he returned to duty on board Cumberland and with that vessel took part in the destruction of the Norfolk Navy Yard during the Civil War.

In May 1861, 2nd Lt Heywood was promoted to first lieutenant, and as such landed with the Marines at Hatteras Inlet, where he was present at the capture of both Fort Clark and Fort Hatteras. He was advanced to captain in November of that year, and during the winter of 1861–62 participated actively in a number of boat expeditions in the James River.

In the fight between Cumberland and CSS Virginia in March 1862, his conduct was particularly noteworthy while commanding the after gun deck division, firing the last gun in the fight and saving himself by jumping overboard as Cumberland went down with her flag flying. He was most favorably mentioned for his gallant conduct and received the brevet rank of major for his services during the engagement.

For some time afterward, he was actively employed, both on shore and at sea, in the search for the notorious raider CSS Alabama, until he applied for duty on board the flagship USS Hartford. He was ordered to that vessel as Fleet Marine Officer of the West Gulf Squadron.

Major Heywood served on shore at Pensacola and was on board Hartford in the Battle of Mobile Bay, where he received the brevet rank of lieutenant colonel for gallant and meritorious services. During that engagement he had charge of two nine-inch guns. His services during the Civil War thus secured for him two brevet ranks for distinguished gallantry in the presence of the enemy.

After the Civil War, Heywood joined the Military Order of the Loyal Legion of the United States – an organization of officers who has served in the Union armed forces during the war.

From 1865 to 1867, he performed duty on board various ships, serving as Admiral Farragut's Fleet Marine Officer on the European Station and later in the same capacity in the North Atlantic Squadron. During this period he also served for a time at Washington, Norfolk and Brooklyn. On November 1, 1876, he attained regular rank of major to which he had been brevetted more than ten years before, and was ordered to command the Marine Barracks, Washington, D.C.

During the serious labor riots of the summer of 1877, Major Heywood commanded a battalion of Marines at Baltimore, Philadelphia, and Reading, Pennsylvania. He was honorably mentioned by General Hancock, United States Army, who was in general command, and received thanks from the Navy Department for his services. His next years of duty carried him to widely separated posts – Mare Island, California, and Brooklyn, New York.

In April 1885, he organized, within twenty-four hours from the time of the order, a battalion of 250 Marines for duty on the Isthmus of Panama to open the transit. Subsequently, under his command on the Isthmus were 800 Marines in addition to a strong detachment of United States Navy and the artillery. For his arduous services the admiral commanding asked Major Heywood to "receive his grateful acknowledgements." Major Heywood was promoted to lieutenant colonel on March 9, 1888.

=== Service as Commandant ===
On January 30, 1891, Lt. Col. Heywood was appointed Colonel Commandant of the Marine Corps. At that time the Marine Corps consisted of 75 officers and 2,100 enlisted men, which gradually rose during his tenure of office until at the time of his retirement in 1903, it had reached the total of 278 officers and 7,532 enlisted personnel, the highest strength up to that point. The Marines at that time were armed with obsolescent M1884 Springfield rifles and .45-70 black-powder ammunition. Training consisted mostly of route marches and drill practice, as there were rarely enough funds to permit regular target practice.

As Commandant, Heywood attempted to improve the fighting ability of Marines in their role as naval infantry, while simultaneously attempting to integrate the Marine Corps more fully into modern naval sea operations. To this end Heywood instituted a regular program of marksmanship training, while having marines train to become gun crews for the secondary batteries aboard the navy's cruisers and battleships.

Although the Marines were scheduled to receive new smokeless powder 6 mm Lee rifles in 1895, delays in production and insufficient appropriations caused the Marine Corps to retain their old M1884 .45-70 Springfield rifles as late as 1897. Commandant Heywood was said to have refused initial deliveries of small allotments of Lee rifles to Marine battalions until he was given assurances that an appropriation would be made to the Corps for at least 3,000 Lee rifles, improved target ranges, and enough ammunition to continue existing marksmanship training programs.

Despite Heywood's efforts, the declaration of war with Spain in 1898 found the Marine Corps ill-prepared for combat in terms of training with modern small arms, battle drills, and small-unit exercises. With no battalion-sized Marine forces at hand, Commandant Heywood ordered a scratch battalion of Marines formed from around 650 Marines stationed across New England, which sailed from Brooklyn, New York just five days later aboard the USS Panther, a former banana boat that had been hastily converted into a troop transport upon the outbreak of hostilities. Designated the First Battalion, and commanded by Lt. Col. Robert W. Huntington, the unit was scheduled to make an opposed landing in Cuba to secure a harbor at Guantánamo Bay. The Panther proved to be a poor substitute for a purpose-designed transport ship, and troop morale plummeted in the tight and sweaty confines of the Panther's holds; later that same year, Commandant Heywood would request in his report to the Secretary of the Navy that the USS Resolute, a converted passenger steamship, should be retained in naval service as a permanent troopship. To make matters worse, Lt. Col. Huntington's marines had only just been issued their Lee rifles together with ten rounds each for familiarization purposes, and officers had to instruct enlisted men on the operation and maintenance of their new rifles on the top deck of the old freighter as it sailed south from New York. Fortunately, during two stopovers at U.S. ports en route to Cuba, Lt. Col. Huntington managed to institute a schedule of rifle marksmanship, small unit training, and battle drills before the Marines made their assault landing on enemy shores.

Heywood was the first commandant to establish a regular system of examinations for officers for promotion and set up the system of officers' schools, which has continued with slight interruption since then. He adopted the current practice of issuing good conduct medals for the betterment of the discipline in the Marine Corps. By increasing the efficiency and morale of the Corps, Heywood hoped to make the Corps an essential auxiliary to the naval service. Under his administration the number of Marine Corps posts were increased from twelve to twenty-one. There was scarcely a regular post at which Maj Gen Heywood was not able to provide new barracks or officers' quarters.

By special acts of Congress, Heywood was promoted to brigadier general in March 1899 and to major general on July 2, 1902. He was the first Marine to hold the rank of major general.

Major General Heywood closed a most distinguished career of over forty-five years as a commissioned officer in the Marine Corps, when on October 3, 1903, in accordance with law, having attained the age of 64 years, he was placed on the retired list.

Eleven years after his retirement, on February 26, 1915, Heywood died from chronic heart disease in Washington, D.C. at the age seventy five. He was buried in Arlington National Cemetery.

== Notes ==
Military offices
Preceded by Col. Charles McCawley	Commandant of the United States Marine Corps; 1891–1903	Succeeded by Maj. Gen. George F. Elliott
