= Waikuri language =

Extinct language of Baja California

Waicuri
- Guaicurian, Guaycura
- Native to: Mexico
- Region: Baja California Sur
- Ethnicity: Guaycura
- Era: last attested 1768
- Language family: unclassified (Guaicurian)
- Dialects: ?Huchití

Language codes
- ISO 639-3: None (mis)
- Glottolog: guai1237
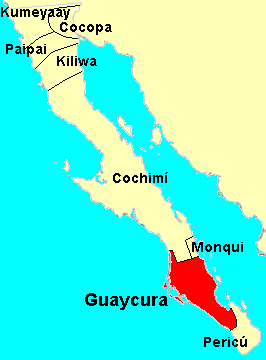
- The location of Guaycura. Monqui and Pericú are essentially unattested; Cochimí, which is also extinct, is a Yuman language.

Waikuri (Guaycura, Waicura) is an extinct language of southern Baja California spoken by the Waikuri or Guaycura people. The Jesuit priest Johann Jakob Baegert documented words, sentences and texts in the language between 1751 and 1768.

Waikuri may be, along with the Yukian and Chumashan languages and other languages of southern Baja such as Pericú, among the oldest languages established in California, before the arrival of speakers of Penutian, Uto-Aztecan, and perhaps even Hokan languages. All are spoken in areas with long-established populations of a distinct physical type.

== Name ==
The ethnonym Waikuri and its variants likely originates from the Pericú word guaxoro 'friend'. Variations of the name include Waicuri, Waicuri, Guaicuri, Waicura, Guaycura, Guaicura, Waicuro, Guaicuro, Guaycuro, Vaicuro, Guaicuru, Guaycuru, Waikur.

== Classification ==
Baegert's data is analyzed by Raoul Zamponi (2004). On existing evidence, Guaycura appears to be unrelated to the Yuman languages to its north. Some linguists have suggested that it belonged to the widely scattered Hokan phylum of California and Mexico (Gursky 1966; Swadesh 1967); however, the evidence for this seems inconclusive (Laylander 1997; Zamponi 2004; Mixco 2006). William C. Massey (1949) suggested a connection with Pericú, but the latter is too meagerly attested to support a meaningful comparison. Other languages of southern Baja are essentially undocumented, though people have speculated from non-linguistic sources that Monqui (Monquí-Didiú), spoken in a small region around Loreto, may have been a 'Guaicurian' language, as perhaps was Huchití (Uchití), though that may have actually been a variety of Guaycura itself (Golla 2007).

The internal classification of Guaicurian (Waikurian) languages is uncertain. Massey (1949), cited in Campbell (1997:169), gives this tentative classification based on similarity judgments given by colonial-era sources, rather than actual linguistic data.

- Guaicurian (Waikurian)
  - Guaicura branch
    - Guaocura (Waikuri)
    - Callejue
  - Huchiti branch
    - Cora
    - Huchiti
    - Aripe
    - Periúe
  - Pericú branch
    - Pericú
    - Isleño

However, Laylander (1997) and Zamponi (2004) conclude that Waikuri and Pericú are unrelated.

== Phonology ==
=== Consonants ===
Consonants were voiceless stops p t c k and maybe a glottal stop; voiced b d, nasal m n ny, flap r, trill rr, and approximants w y.

Waikuri consonants
		Labial	Alveolar		Palatal	Velar	Glottal
Plosive	voiceless	p	t			k	(ʔ)
Plosive	voiced	b	d				
Affricate					t͡ʃ		
Nasal		m	n		ɲ		
Rhotic			ɾ	r			
Approximant		w			j		

=== Vowels ===
Waikuri had four vowels, /i, e, a, u/. Whether or not vowel length was phonemic is unknown.

== Grammar ==
The little we know of Guaycura grammar was provided by Francisco Pimentel, who analyzed a few verbs and phrases. Guaicura was a polysyllabic language that involved much compounding. For example, 'sky' is tekerakadatemba, from tekaraka (arched) and datemba (earth).

Beagert and Pimentel agree that the plural is formed with a suffix -ma. However, Pimentel also notes a prefix k- with the 'same' function. For example, kanai 'women', from anai 'woman'. According to Pimentel, the negation in -ra of an adjective resulted in its opposite, so from ataka 'good' is derived atakara 'bad'.

Pronouns were as follows (Golla 2011):

Pronouns
Subject		Object		Inalienable possessive		Alienable possessive
I	be			my	be- ~ m-	bekún
thou	e’i	thee	e’i ?	thy	e-	ekún
s/he	?			his/her	ti- ~ t-	
we	katé	us	kepe	our	kepe-	kepekún
you	peté				?	
they	?			their		kikún

== Vocabulary ==
Waikuri vocabulary from Zamponi (2004), which was compiled primarily from 18th-century sources by Johann Jakov Baegert, as well as from Lamberto Hostell and Francisco de Ortega:

=== Nouns ===
English gloss	Waikuri	Notes
earth, land	datembà; atembà	
sky	tekerekádatembà	lit. ‘arched earth/land’
day	untâiri, untáîri	
week	ambúja	‘place where one lives; house; church’
year; pitahaya	ambía	
mescal	pui; kenjei, kennei	
horse; mule	titschénu-tschà	‘child of a wise mother’
k.o. snake	matanamu	‘light red . . . [snake] with black spots’
k.o. eagle	jatacrie	lit. ‘deer-catcher’
man; person	éte (pl. ti)	
woman	ánaï (pl. kánaï)	
father	-dáre, -áre (man speaking); -cue (woman speaking)	
parent	pera kari	
son	-tschánu, -tschénu	
shaman	taniti; tantipara	
missionary	tià-pa-tù	‘one who has his house in the north'
forehead	-tapà ~ -apà	
nose	-inamù	
arm; hand	-kére	
right arm	-tschuketà	
pain	-enembeû	
food	búe	
place where one lives; house; church	ambúja	
ceremonial wand	tiyeicha	lit. ‘he can talk’
dance floor	amaeka	
word	-tanía	
a song	ambéra didì	
a dance	agénari	
payment	tenkíe	

=== Pronouns ===
English gloss	Waikuri	Notes
I	be (subject)	
you (sg.)	eï	subject
we	catè	subject
you (pl.)	petè	subject
you (sg.); to you	eï	direct/indirect object
us; to us	kepe	direct/indirect object
mine	becún, beticún	also used adjectivally with alienably possessed nouns
yours (sg.)	ecún, ecùn; eiticún	also used adjectivally with alienably possessed nouns
ours	kepecùn	also used adjectivally with alienably possessed nouns
theirs	kicùn	also used adjectivally with alienably possessed nouns
this one	tâupe	
these ones	cávape	
that one	tutâu	
those ones	tucáva	
this same one	tâuvérepe	probably also used as a demonstrative determiner
who?	aipe(e), ci pe	
all, everything	pu	also quantifier; cf. 'all'
something	uë	
nothing	vâra, buarà	

=== Other parts of speech ===
English gloss	Waikuri	Notes
great	apánne	
good	atacá (pl. atacámma), aata ce; atukià	
ugly; bad	entuditù (pl. entuditámma)	
washed	kunjukaráü (pl.)	
beaten	tschipitschürre (pl. kutipaû)	
dead	tibikíu (pl.)	
arched	tekereká	
alone	íbe	
many (?)	pari; cuncari	
all	pù	
three	akúnju	
this	jatúpe, jaûpe	
in (a region); from (separation); by means of	pè	preposition
from (source); at the side of; in (time)	me	preposition
of	te	preposition
on, upon	tína	preposition
below	búnju	postposition
on account of	déve; tiptischeû	preposition
acknowledge	akátuikè	
be	daï (sg.?); kéa (pl.?)	
be ashamed	ié	
be born	pedára	
beat	tschípake	
become	punjére	
believe	irimánju	
bury	kejenjùta (pl.?)	
can	puduéne	
chat	jake (pl. kuáke)	
come	ku	
command	ïebitschéne	
confess	kutéve	
die	pibikí (?)	
do (cause)	tujakè	
fight	piabakè (pl. kupiábake)	
forgive	kuitscharrakè, kuitscharaké	
give	uteürì, utere; kên	
go down, descend	keritschéü	
go up	tschukíti	
hate	kumbáte	
have	atú	
help	tikakambà	
kiss	tschumuge	
know	kériri, rthe risi, kereri	
lie (down)	tíe	
live	tipè, tipé	
make, create	uretì	
obey	jebarraké	
play	amukíri	
praise	tschakárrake	
protect	kakunjà	
remember	umutù (pl. kumutú)	
sit	penekà	
stretch out	kutikürre (pl. ?)	
suffer	híbitsche	
talk	tiyeicha	‘can talk’ ?; cf. 'ceremonial wand'
there is	epí	
touch	undiri	
wish, desire	cuvu	
then	enjéme	
above	aëna	
from there	aipúreve	
and	tschie	
as	páe, pàe	
imperative particle	têi (sg.); tu (pl.)	
no	vâra	‘nothing’; cf. 'nothing'
thanks (?)	payro	

== Sample text ==
The Pater Noster is recorded in Guaycura, with a literal gloss by Pimentel (1874: cap. XXV).

Kepe-dare
Padre Nuestro
Kepe-dare	tekerekadatemba	daï,	ei-ri	akatuike	pu-me,	tschakarrake	pu-me	ti	tschie.
Padre nuestro	(que en el) cielo	estás,	te	reconocemos	todos (los que) existimos	(y te) alaban	todos (los que) somos	hombres	y.
Ecun	gracia	ri	atume	cate	tekerekedatemba	tschie.	Ei-ri	jebarrakeme	ti
(Y por) tu	gracia	?	tengamos	nosotros	(el) cielo	(y).	Te	obedeceremos	(los) hombres
pu	jaupe	datemba	pae	ei	jebarrakere	aëna	kea.	Kepekun	bue
todos	aquí	(en la) tierra	como	a ti	obedientes	arriba	siendo.	Nuestra	comida
kepe	ken	jatupe	untairi.	Kate	kuitscharrake	tei	tschie	kepecun	atakamara,
(a) nos	da	este	día.	(Y a) nos	perdona		(y)	nuestro	malo (pecado),
pae	kuitscharrakere	cate	tschie	cavape	atukiara	kepetujake.	Cate	tikakamba	tei
como	perdonamos	nosotros	también	(a) los	(que) mal	(nos) hacen.	(A) nos	ayuda	
tschie	cuvume	ra	cate	uë	atukiara.	Kepe	kakunja	pe	atacara
y	(no) querremos	no	nosotros	algo	malo.	(Y a) nos	protege	de	mal
tschie.
y.

== Additional reading ==
- Gursky, Karl-Heinz (January 1966). "On the Historical Position of Waikuri". International Journal of American Linguistics. 32 (1): 41–45. doi:10.1086/464877. ISSN 0020-7071.
- Laylander, Don. 1997. "The linguistic prehistory of Baja California". In Contributions to the Linguistic Prehistory of Central and Baja California, edited by Gary S. Breschini and Trudy Haversat, pp. 1–94. Coyote Press, Salinas, California.
- Massey, William C. 1949. "Tribes and languages of Baja California". Southwestern Journal of Anthropology 5:272–307.
- Mixco, Mauricio J. 2006. "The indigenous languages". In The Prehistory of Baja California: Advances in the Archaeology of the Forgotten Peninsula, edited by Don Laylander and Jerry D. Moore, pp. 24–41. University Press of Florida, Gainesville.
- Swadesh, Morris. 1967. "Lexicostatistical Classification". in Linguistics, edited by Norman A. McQuown, pp. 79–115. Handbook of Middle American Indians, Vol. 5, Robert Wauchope, general editor. University of Texas Press, Austin.
