= Pericúes =

Historical Indigenous peoples of Baja California, Mexico

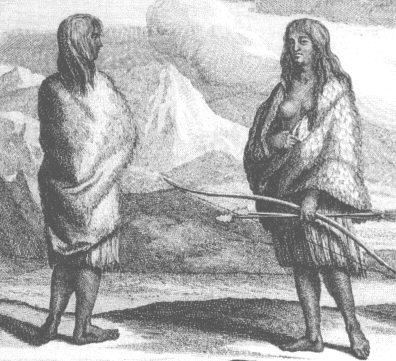
Baja California women, probably Pericúes, 1726

The Pericúes or Pericú were an Indigenous people of Mexico. They lived in the Cape Region, the southernmost portion of Baja California Sur. They have been linguistically and culturally extinct since the late 18th century.

== Name ==
The Pericú are also known as Pericues, Cora, and Edues.

== Territory ==
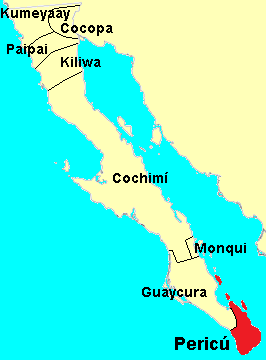

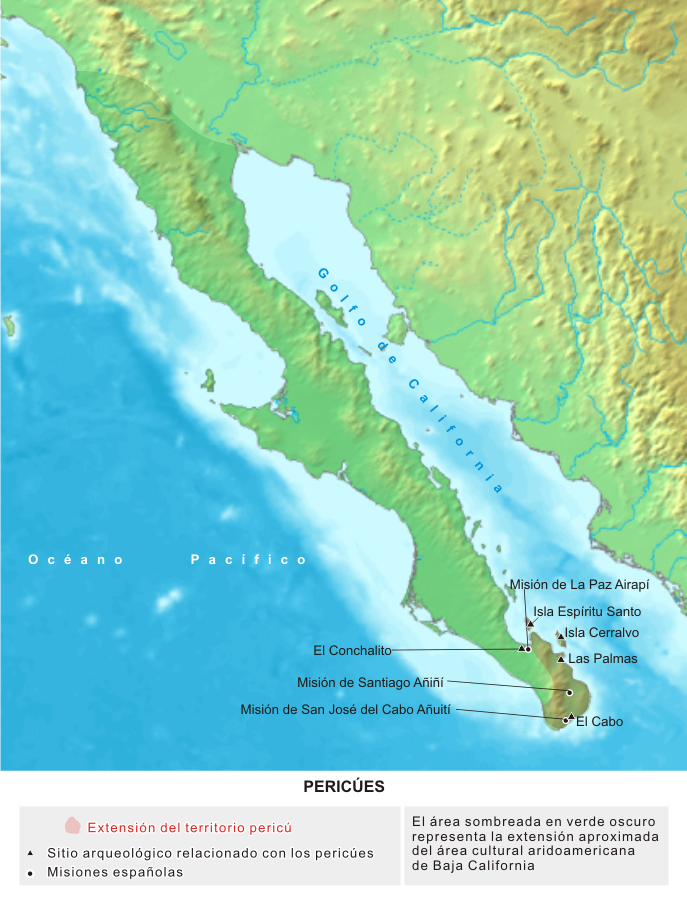
Spanish Roman Catholic missions among the Pericúes.

The Pericú people's territory was along the southern edge of the Baja California Peninsula, from Todos Santos on the western coast to La Paz in the northeast, together with the large Gulf of California Islands of Cerralvo, Espíritu Santo, La Partida, and San José. William C. Massey thought that the northern portion of the Cape Region, including Bahía las Palmas and Bahía Ventana, was occupied by a Guaycura group known as the Cora. Subsequent reexamination of the ethnohistoric evidence suggests that Cora was synonymous with Pericú.

The status of the La Paz area is uncertain. Massey assigned it to two groups: the Guaycuran Aripa, and the Cora, then thought to be Guaycuran as well but now recognized as Pericú. W. Michael Mathes argued that it had belonged to the Pericú in the 16th and 17th centuries but was taken over by the Guaycura some time between 1668 and 1720. An alternative interpretation is that it was disputed ground between the Pericú and Guaycura throughout the early historic period.

== Language ==
The Pericú language is extinct and unattested. Evidence concerning the language spoken by the Pericú is limited to a handful of words plus fewer than a dozen place names. Jesuit missionaries recognized Pericú as a language distinct from Guaycura. Massey suggested that Pericú and Guaycura had together constituted a Guaycuran language family, but this seems to have been based purely on their geographic proximity.

== History ==
=== Precontact ===
The archaeological record for Pericú territory extends at least as far back as the terminal Pleistocene, about 12,000 years ago. The distinctive hyperdolichocephalic (long-headed) skulls found in Cape Region burials have suggested to some scholars that the ancestors of the Pericú were either trans-Pacific immigrants or remnants of some of the New World's earliest inhabitants. The distinctive Las Palmas burial complex, involving secondary burials painted with red ochre and deposited in caves or rockshelters, was particularly noted. The continued use of the atlatl and dart alongside the bow and arrow as late as the 17th century, long after their replacement in most of North America, has been used to argue for an exceptional degree of isolation in southern Baja California.

Harumi Fujita has traced the changing patterns in the exploitation of marine resources and in settlement within the prehistoric Cape Region. According to Fujita, after about AD 1000, four major centers of socioeconomic and ceremonial importance emerged in the Cape Region: near Cabo San Lucas, at Cabo Pulmo, at La Paz, and on Isla Espíritu Santo.

=== Early contacts ===
Spanish contacts with the Pericú began in the 1530s, first when Fortún Ximénez and mutineers from an expedition sent out by Hernán Cortés, the conqueror of central Mexico, reached La Paz, followed shortly afterwards by an expedition under Cortés himself.

Sporadic encounters, sometimes friendly and sometimes hostile, linked the Pericú with a succession of European explorers, privateers, missionaries, Manila galleons, and pearl hunters throughout the 16th, 17th, and early 18th centuries.

=== 18th century ===
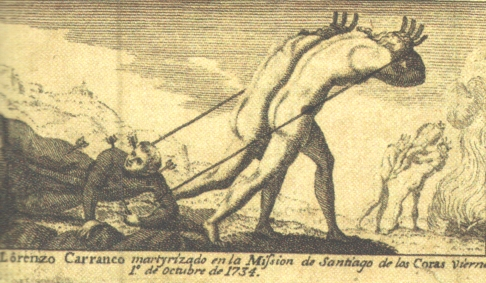
Martyrdom of Lorenzo Carranco, at the beginning of the Pericú Revolt in Santiago de los Coras de Añiñí, 1 October 1734.

The Jesuits established their first permanent mission in Baja California at Loreto in 1697, but it was more than two decades later that they felt prepared to move into the Cape Region. Missions serving the Pericú, at least in part, were established at La Paz (1720), Santiago (1724), and San José del Cabo (1730). A dramatic reversal came in 1734 when the Pericú Revolt began, resulting in the most serious challenge the Jesuits experienced in Baja California. Two missionaries were killed, and for two years Jesuit control over the Cape Region was interrupted. The Pericú themselves suffered most, however, with combat deaths added to the already devastating effects of Old World diseases. By the time the Spanish crown expelled the Jesuits from Baja California in 1768, the Pericú seem to have been culturally extinct, although some of their genes may survive in local mestizo populations.

== Traditional culture ==
The Pericú are known primarily through the accounts of early European visitors. The most detailed of these were left by English privateers who spent time at Cabo San Lucas in 1709–1710 and 1721.

=== Subsistence and material culture ===
The Pericú are best known for their maritime orientation, harvesting fish, shellfish, and marine mammals from the waters of the southern Gulf of California. Terrestrial resources such as agave, the fruit of cacti, small game, and deer were also important. Agriculture was not practiced.

The Pericú were one of the few aboriginal groups on the California coasts to possess watercraft other than tule balsas, making use of wooden rafts and double-bladed paddles. Nets, spears or harpoons, darts, and bows and arrows were tools for procuring fish and meat. Bags, baskets, and gourds were used for carrying, since pottery was not made. The requirements for shelter and clothing were minimal, although the women wore skirts of fiber or animal skins and both sexes adopted various forms of adornment.

=== Social organization ===
The division of labor among the Pericú was evidently based primarily or exclusively on sex and age. They were variously reported as being either monogamous or polygamous. Communities seem to have been politically independent. Leadership positions were hereditary and were sometimes held by women. Inter-community and inter-ethnic warfare seems to have been frequent, and conflicts with the Guaycura were chronic.

=== Religion ===
Fragments of Pericú mythology were recorded in the early 1730s. Shamans claimed to be able to effect supernatural cures of the sick. Mortuary and mourning observances were particularly elaborate.

The people believed in an all-powerful master named Niparaya, creator of heaven and earth. His wife is Amayicoyondi and they had three sons. One is called Quaayayp, who created the race of men. He was later killed by them. The second was Acaragui. The third was called Wac or Tuparan, depending on the sect.

== See also ==
- Las Palmas complex
