= Las Palmas complex =

Archaeological pattern

The Las Palmas complex is an archaeological pattern recognized primarily on the basis of mortuary customs in the Cape region of Baja California Sur, Mexico.

The complex is focused on the occurrence in caves or rockshelters of secondary human burials containing bones painted with red ochre. The skulls in such burials tend to be extremely long-headed (hyperdolichocephalic), leading to suggestions that makers of the Las Palmas complex (identified with the historically known Pericú) might represent either a genetically isolated remnant of a very early wave of immigrants into the Americas or later trans-Pacific migrants. Other elements in the material inventory of the Las Palmas complex include stone grinding basins, atlatls, lark's-head netting, coiled basketry, and sewn palm-bark containers.

The distinctive burial pattern was recognized in the late nineteenth century by Herman ten Kate and Léon Diguet. Archaeologist William C. Massey investigated and described the Las Palmas complex in detail.
