= Misión Estero de las Palmas de San José del Cabo Añuití =

Mission San José del Cabo
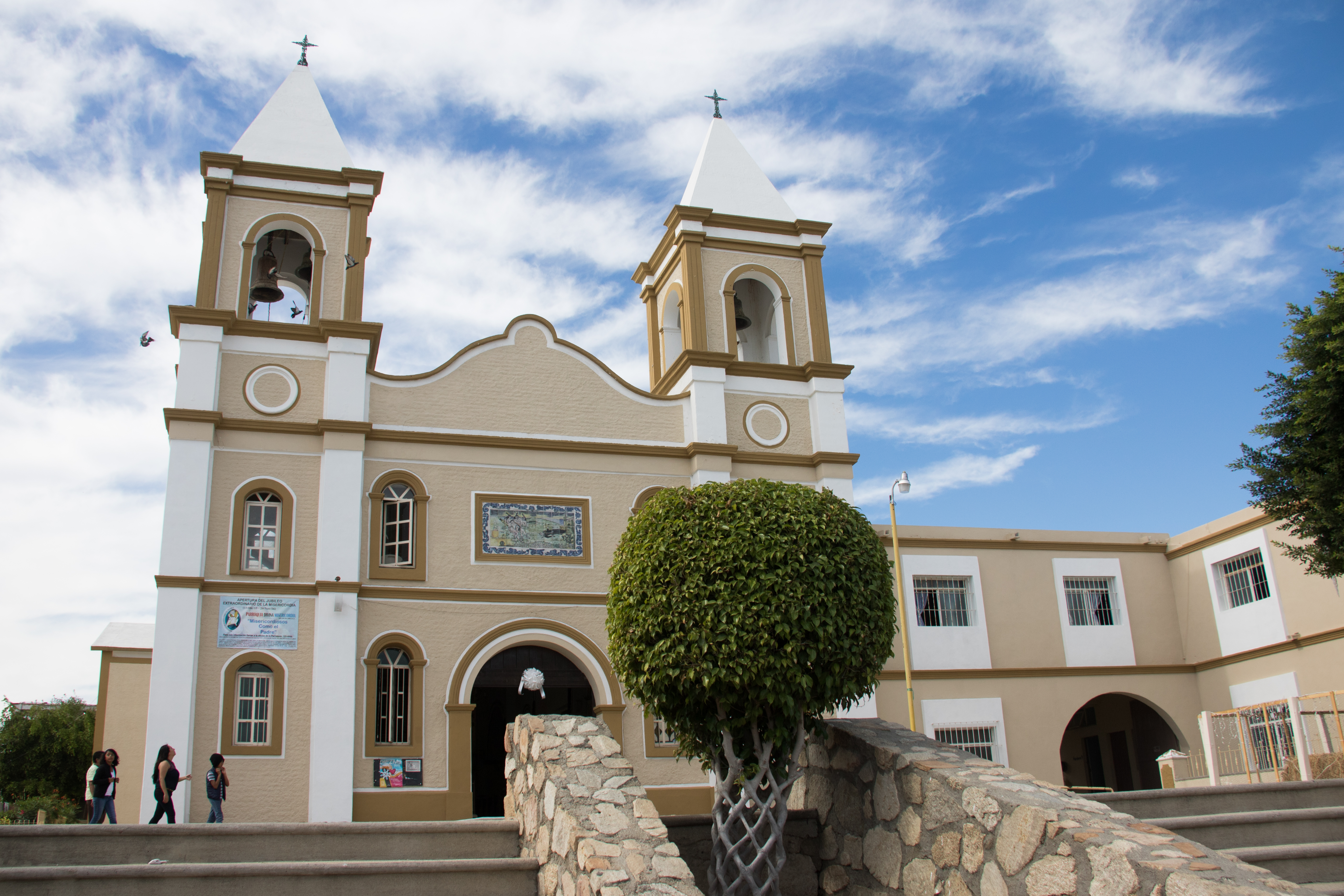
- The current San José del Cabo cathedral, constructed in 1940

- Location in Baja California Sur Location in Mexico
- Location: San José del Cabo, Baja California Sur, Mexico
- Coordinates: 23.0621°N 109.6958°W
- Name as founded: Misión Estero de las Palmas de San José del Cabo Añuití
- Patron: Saint Joseph
- Founded: April 8, 1730
- Founded by: Nicolá Tamara
- Built: 1940
- Founding Order: Society of Jesus
- Native tribe(s) Spanish name(s): Pericúes
- Native place name: Añuití

Mission San José del Cabo (Spanish: Misión Estero de las Palmas de San José del Cabo Añuití) was the southernmost of the Jesuit missions on the Baja California peninsula, established in 1730 on the outskirts of the modern city of San José del Cabo in Baja California Sur, Mexico.

The southern cape of the Baja California peninsula had been an often-visited landmark for Spanish navigators (as well as English privateers) for nearly two centuries when a mission was finally established at the Pericú settlement of Añuití in 1730 by Nicolá Tamaral. The Río San José, or San José River, stops just shy of the ocean, with a one kilometer long sand bar creating an estuary, the third largest in Mexico. This pooling of brackish water has created an oasis in the surrounding Sarcocaule desert. The Río San José flows largely underground for 40 kilometres (25 mi) from its origin in the Sierra de la Laguna. For more than 250 years it has furnished drinking and irrigation water for the town of San Jose del Cabo, beginning as a source of fresh water for Spanish galleons traveling back from the Philippines. Over the sand bar from the estuary is a bay referred to by early Spanish explorers, including Sebastian Vizcaino, as the Bahía de San Bernabé or Bay of San Bernabé (now the Bay of San José del Cabo). Initially located near the beach, the station was subsequently moved inland about 8 kilometres (5.0 mi).

In 1734 the Pericú Revolt broke out, Tamaral was killed, and the mission was destroyed. In 1735–1736, the reestablished outpost was moved back closer to the coast, but it served as a visita for Mission Santiago and as the site of a Spanish presidio. In 1753, San José del Cabo was again moved inland. In 1795, under the Dominicans, the surviving native population of Mission Santiago was transferred to San José del Cabo. The mission was finally closed in 1840.

In the early 20th century, the mission was damaged by several storms and it was subsequently expanded and renovated. A storm in 1958 destroyed the Revival wooden roof.

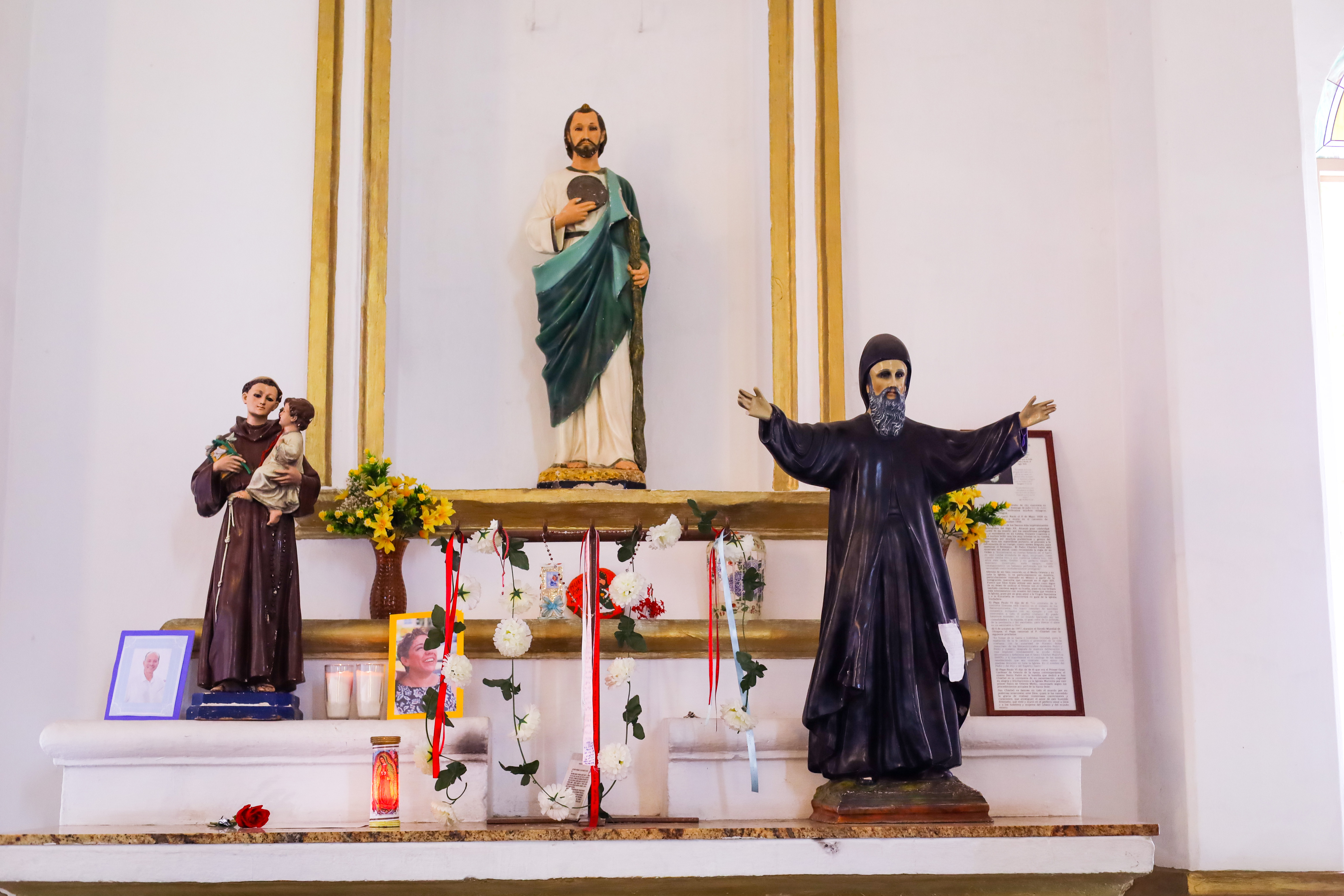
Interior of Mission San Jose del Cabo

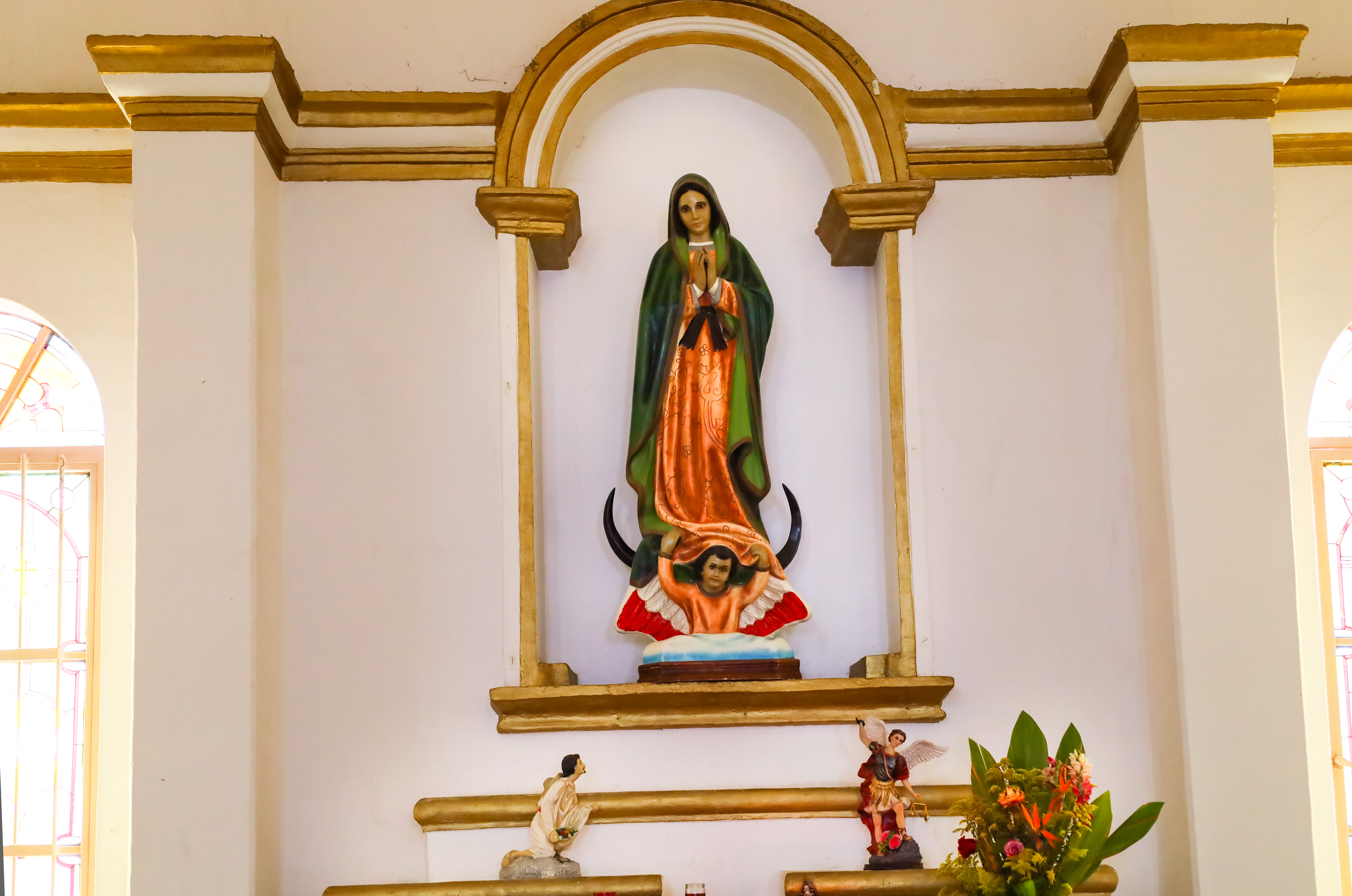
Virgin of Guadalupe in Mission San Jose del Cabo

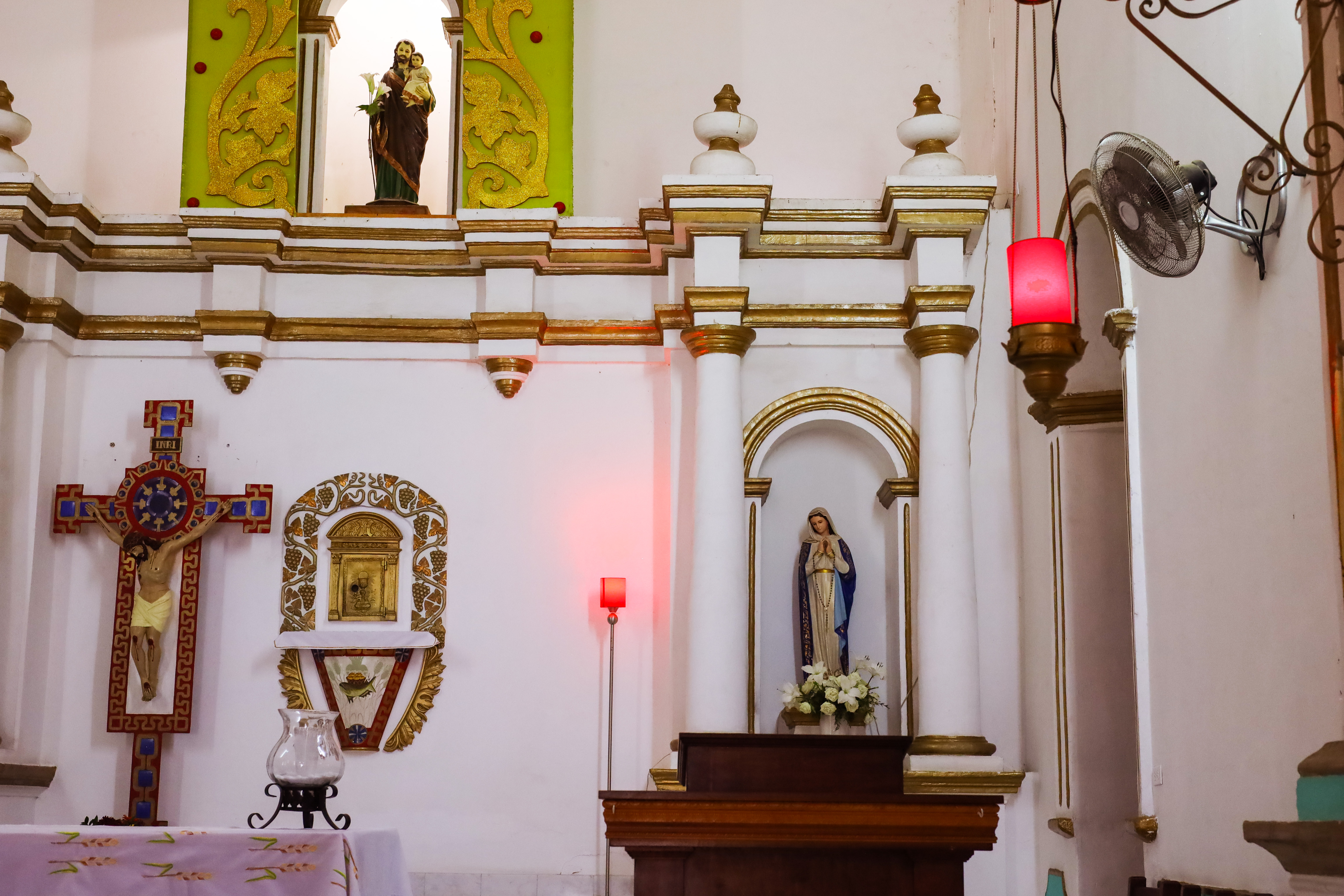
Interior of Mission San Jose del Cabo

== See also ==
- Los Cabos Municipality
- Missions in Baja California Sur
- List of Jesuit sites
