= Johann Jakob Baegert =

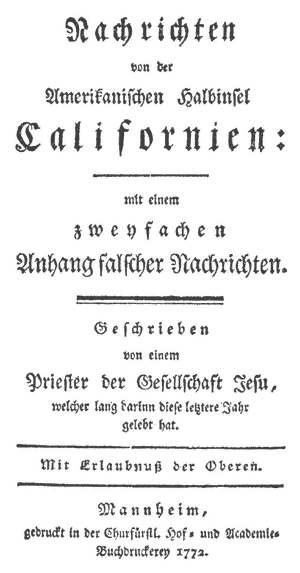
Titlepage of Jacob Baegert's Observations in Lower California, 1772

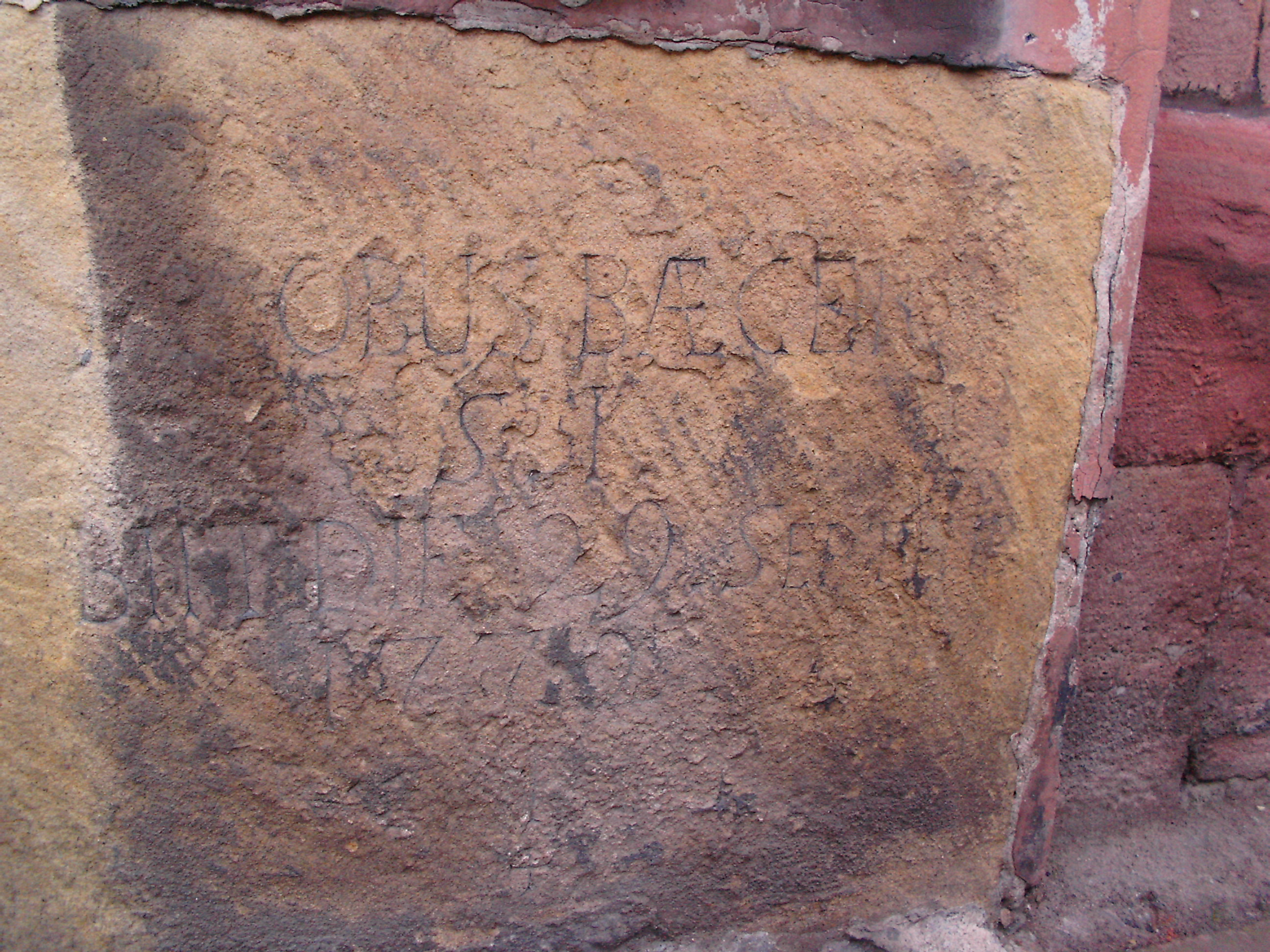
Damaged tombstone of Rev. Jacob Baegert in Neustadt an der Weinstraße (2010): "P. JACOBUS BAEGERT S.J., OBIIT DIE 29. SEPT. 1772"

Johann Jakob Baegert (or Jacob Baegert, Jacobo Baegert) (December 22, 1717 – September 29, 1772) was a Jesuit missionary at San Luis Gonzaga in Baja California Sur, Mexico. He is noted for his detailed and acerbic account of the peninsula, the culture of its native inhabitants, and the history of its Spanish exploration and missionization.

== Early life ==
Baegert was born in Sélestat, Alsace, the son of a leather worker. Of his three brothers and three sisters, two brothers and two sisters also entered religious orders, and the third brother was a secular priest.

== Missionary work ==
Baegert began his Jesuit novitiate at Mainz in 1736 and received further training at Mannheim and Molsheim. After serving briefly as a professor at the college in Haguenau, he was assigned to missionary work in the New World. He went by way of Genoa and Cádiz to Veracruz, Mexico City, and finally Baja California from 1749 to 1751. Baegert's travels across Europe as well as his experiences in Mexico and Baja California were described in ten letters he wrote to his family (Baegert 1777, 1982).

The new missionary was assigned to work among the Guaycura at Mission San Luis Gonzaga. Initially established as a "visita," or subordinate mission station, by Clemente Guillén in 1721, the mission was founded in 1740 and managed in succession by Lambert Hostell and Johann Bischoff prior to Baegert's arrival. Baegert served at San Luis Gonzaga for the next 17 years, also functioning for a time as the Superior for the California missions.

In 1767, the Spanish king Charles III ordered the expulsion of the Jesuits. As a non-Spanish subject, Baegert traveled back to Sélestat and ultimately settled at Neustadt an der Weinstraße in 1770, where he worked as a priest and teacher until he died.

== Burial place ==
Jacob Baegert was buried in Neustadt and his simple tombstone is kept there, outside of St. Mary's Catholic Church.

== Publications ==
He published his description of Baja California in 1771, with a revised edition appearing in 1772 (Baegert 1772, 1952).

Baegert's book includes an account of the Guaycura language and many other aspects of native culture.
