= Charles Heywood (1803–1853) =

U.S. Navy lieutenant

Charles Heywood (1803–1853), was a lieutenant in the U. S. Navy, who distinguished himself in the defense of San José del Cabo during the Mexican–American War.

Born June 19, 1803, in Massachusetts, Charles Heywood joined the U.S. Navy. He rose to the rank of midshipman, on November 1, 1826, then passed midshipman, on April 28, 1832, then to lieutenant, March 8, 1837. He then married Antonia Delgardo in 1838. He was the father of three children. His eldest child was Charles Heywood, later ninth Commandant of the Marine Corps. Heywood died at sea on January 16, 1853.
