= Charles H. Hayward =

English cabinet maker

- Born: Charles Harold Hayward; 26 April 1898; Pimlico, London, England
- Died: 5 July 1998 (aged 100)
- Occupation: Cabinet maker, author, magazine editor
- Subject: Woodworking, carpentry, cabinet making, turning
- Years active: 1923–1979
- Spouse: Ivy Edith Milsom

Charles Harold Hayward (26 April 1898 – 5 July 1998) was an English cabinet maker, editor of The Woodworker magazine, illustrator, and author of numerous books on woodworking. Hayward has been described as "the most important workshop writer and editor of the 20th century".

== Biography ==
Born in Pimlico, London in 1898, he apprenticed with Old Times Furniture Company. During the First World War Hayward served in the Royal Artillery as a horse driver. In 1923 he began his own cabinet making business alongside working as a technical illustrator; he also began contributing to The Woodworker. In 1925 he began contributing to Handicrafts magazine, before becoming its editor in 1930. In 1935 he left Handicrafts to become the associate editor of The Woodworker, and with the outbreak of the Second World War in 1939 he became editor of the magazine. He remained editor until his retirement in 1968, though after that he continued contributing to the magazine. (Note: There is disagreement between sources on the exact years of his editorship, see Honest Labour (Uhl, 2020) p.VII.)

== Publications ==
Alongside The Woodworker, Hayward authored, edited and illustrated over 30 books on woodworking, including:

- English Period Furniture (1936)
- Practical Veneering (1937)
- Charles Hayward's Carpentry Book (1938)
- Tools for Woodwork (1946)
- Cabinet Making for Beginners (1947)
- The Woodworkers' Pocketbook (1949)
- Woodwork Joints (1950)
- The Complete Book of Woodwork (1955)
