= Misión San Luis Gonzaga Chiriyaqui =

18th-century Spanish mission in Baja California Sur, Mexico

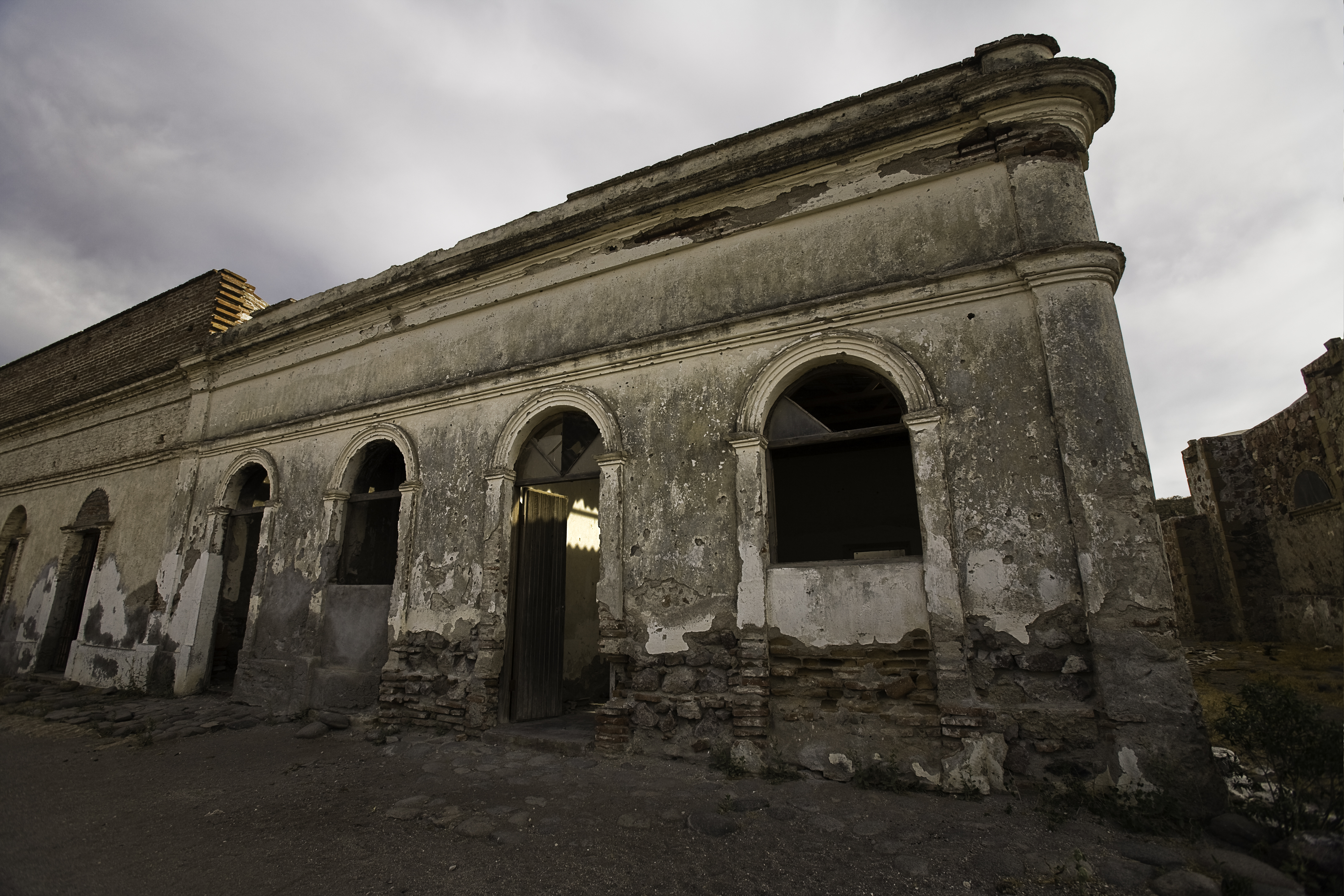
San Luis Gonzaga Mission, Baja California Sur

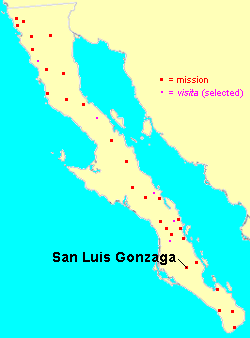

Mission San Luis Gonzaga was a Jesuit mission established among the Guaycura on the Magdalena Plains of central Baja California Sur, Mexico. The mission was dedicated to Aloysius Gonzaga.

Initially in 1721 a visita or subordinate mission station of Mission Dolores near the coast to the east, the site was elevated to mission status by Lambert Hostell in 1737. One of Hostell's successors was Johann Jakob Baegert, who served from 1751 until the Jesuits were expelled and the mission was closed in 1768. Baegert is notable for his detailed but acerbic account of his experiences in Baja California. He oversaw the construction of stone and adobe brick structures that still survive at the site.

== See also ==
- Missions in Baja California Sur
- List of Jesuit sites
