= Battle of San José del Cabo =

- Part of the Mexican–American War
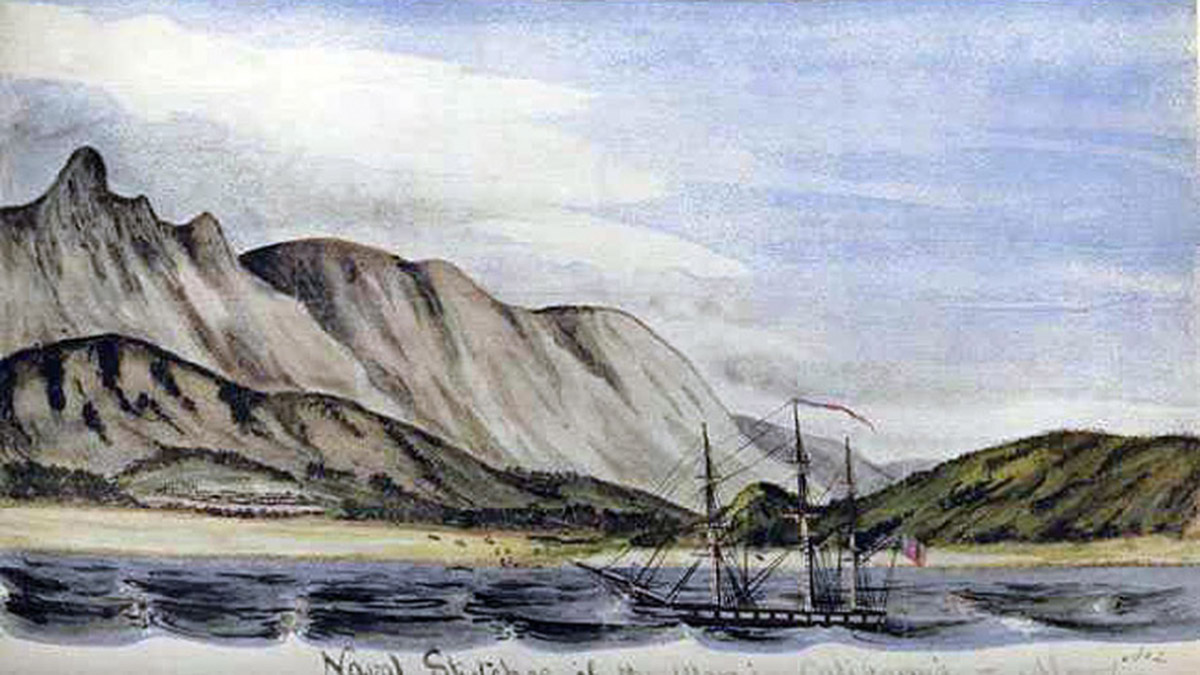
- USS Dale at San Jose del Cabo in 1847 by William H. Meyer
Date	November 20–21, 1847
Location	San José del Cabo, Baja California Sur, Mexico
Result	American victory

Belligerents
United States	Mexico

Commanders and leaders
Charles Heywood, William Shubrick	(Mexico) José Antonio Mijares †

Strength
20 marines 20 militia 4 sailors 12 Californians; 1 artillery piece	~150 militia

Casualties and losses
1 wounded	8 killed a number wounded

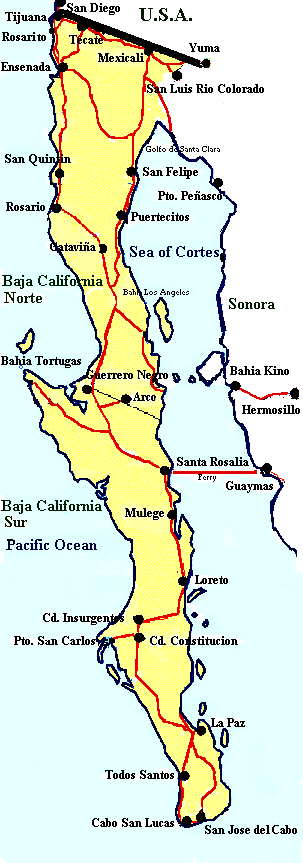
San José del Cabo is at the southern tip

The Battle of San José del Cabo was a military engagement of the Mexican–American War which took place on two November days in 1847, after the fall of Mexico City.

== Background ==
On 21 July, 115 men from the Seventh Regiment of New York Volunteers landed peacefully at La Paz, under the command of Lt. Col. Henry S. Burton. Before departing to capture Mazatlan on 11 Nov., Commodore William Shubrick landed 4 sailors and 20 marines, with a 9-pounder carronade, at San Jose del Cabo under the command of Lt. Charles Heywood. Heywood's men made the old mission building into a fort. Additionally, 12 Californians joined the American force, occupying the Mott house.

Captain Manuel Pineda Munoz had sent Vincente Mejia, Jose Matias Moreno and José Antonio Mijares with 150 men from La Paz to demand the surrender of the San Jose del Cabo garrison, which was refused on 19 Nov.

== Battle ==
On 19 November at 3 PM, 150 mounted Mexican men occupied La Somita. At sunset, the Mexicans used their 6-pounder to fire upon the Americans along Main Street, which did little damage. The Mexicans were beaten back from an attack on the Mott house at 10 PM and the south end of Main street, the Mexicans retiring only at daylight.

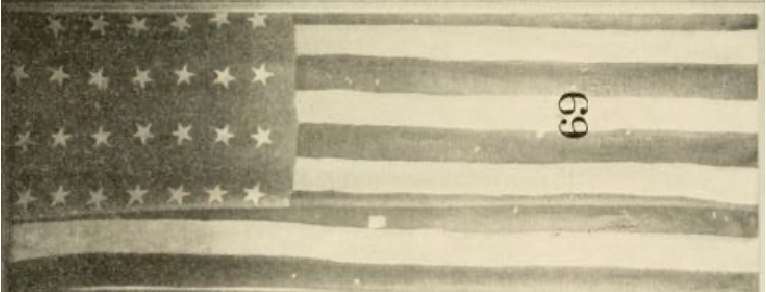
27 star American Flag used by the marines

20 November was quiet until sunset, when the Mexicans attacked, attempting to capture the American gun and gain the roof of the fort, but grape shot, canister shot and musket fire stopped the attack. On 21 November, the whalers Magnolia and Edward arrived, and the Mexican force withdrew after the discharge of the whalers' guns.

== Aftermath ==
Upon hearing of the attack at San José del Cabo, Commodore Shubrick sent the storeship USS Southampton and the first-class sloop-of-war USS Portsmouth to reinforce Heywood's men. The Southampton arrived on November 26 and the Portsmouth on December 3.

Captain Pineda, facing two defeats, one at La Paz where he personally commanded the battle, recalled his company from San José and decided to escalate his attack strength, first at the Siege of La Paz and then again at the Siege of San José del Cabo. For his brave action in the final assault on the American fort , the Mexicans consider the death of Lieutenant Mijares as heroic and have placed a monument to honor him on the main street of San José del Cabo, which is called Boulevard Antonio Mijares.
