= Tiipai language =

Yuman language spoken in Mexico and US

Tiipay
- Native to: United States, Mexico
- Region: California, Baja California
- Ethnicity: 4,250 Kumeyaay (2016)
- Native speakers: 100 in the US (2007); 290 (2011) to 500 (2020 census) in Mexico; (assuming all Diegueño in Mexico are Tiipay)
- Language family: Yuman: Core Yuman; Delta–California; Tiipay
- Dialects: Huerteño

Language codes
- ISO 639-3: dih (as part of Diegueño)
- Glottolog: kumi1248
- ELP: Tipai
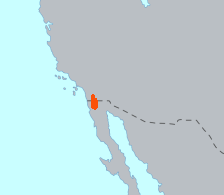
- The traditional geographic distribution of Tiipai speakers

- Tiipai is classified as Severely Endangered by the UNESCO Atlas of the World's Languages in Danger.

Tiipai, Tiipay or Tipai is a Native American language belonging to the Delta–California branch of the Yuman language family, which spans Arizona, California, and Baja California. As part of the Yuman family, Tiipai has also been consistently included in the controversial quasi-stock Hokan. Tiipai is spoken by a number of Kumeyaay tribes in northern Baja California and southern San Diego County, California. There were, conservatively, 200 Tiipai speakers in California in the early 1990s, and 100 reported it 2007, with an additional 230 speakers in Mexico in 2000.

In the past, Tiipai and its neighbors to the north, Kumeyaay and Ipai, had been considered three dialects of a single Diegueño language—as a result, Tiipai is also known as Southern Diegueño. However, linguists now recognize that they represent at least three distinct language clusters within a speech variety continuum. Tiipai itself is not a uniform speech variety, with borders that are far from clearcut and variations across towns such as Jamul, San José, and La Huerta. Some suggest that it might be possible to recognize multiple languages within Tiipai. On the other hand, despite a great deal of lexical variation, all varieties of Tiipai are mutually intelligible, meaning that it is a single language with a great deal of variation across communities. For a discussion of sociolinguistic motivation for this variation, see Field 2011.

Loanwords are numerous in Tiipai—the majority are from Spanish, while a few come from English. Published documentation of the Tiipai language includes a descriptive grammar of Jamul Tiipai, a trilingual dictionary, a trilingual book of stories and oral histories from Baja California Kumiai communities, a word list, and texts, including audio and video on the ELAR website.

== Phonology ==
=== Vowels ===
The Jamul dialect of Tiipai contains seven vowels, four short and three long, as length is contrastive in Tiipai. The only short vowel without a corresponding long vowel is /ə/. This phoneme only appears in unstressed positions and is inserted to break up consonant clusters, though its appearance is not entirely predictable. Short vowels in the final position are often followed by aspiration, but unlike other Yuman languages, initial vowels do not have an aspirated onset.

| | Short | | | Long | | |
| | Front | Central | Back | Front | Central | Back |
|---|---|---|---|---|---|---|
| High | i | | u | iː ⟨ii⟩ | | uː ⟨uu⟩ |
| Mid | | ə ⟨e⟩ | | | | |
| Low | | a | | | aː ⟨aa⟩ | |

Tiipai features many alternations in vowels, with several vowels having multiple allophones. Only predictable variations are discussed below, but there are additional cases where two allophones covary, appearing in the same condition.

The phoneme /i/ is usually realized as [ɪ], though it is realized as [i] between palatals and when stressed and as [ɛ] when preceded by /m/ or /xʷ/ and followed by /r/ when stressed. The long vowel /iː/ is realized as [ɪː] when stressed and preceding /w/ or adjacent to /x/. Additionally, /iː/ is realized as [ɛː] when unstressed between /x/ and /m/.

The vowel /u/ is normally realized as [ʊ], though it is realized as [u] when stressed and followed by /j/ and [o] when unstressed and before /ʔ/. /uː/ is realized as [oː] when stressed and followed by /tː/, /j/, or a velar consonant.

/a/ surfaces as [ɛ] when between palatals (unless it is stressed and preceding /nʲ/) and when preceded by a consonant other than /p/, /t/, or /ʔ/ and followed by /j/. It is realized as [o] before /w/.

/ə/ is consistently realized as [ʊ] between labials.

=== Consonants ===
Jamul Tiipai features a consonant inventory of 21 phonemes.

| | Bilabial | Dental | Alveolar | | (Alveolo-) palatal | Velar | | Glottal |
| | Bilabial | Dental | nor. | pal. | (Alveolo-) palatal | nor. | lab. | Glottal |
|---|---|---|---|---|---|---|---|---|
| Stop/ Affricate | p | t̪ ⟨t⟩ | t ⟨tt⟩ | | tʃ ⟨ch⟩ | k | kʷ ⟨kw⟩ | ʔ ⟨ʼ⟩ |
| Fricative | | s | ɬ ⟨ll⟩ | ɬʲ ⟨lly⟩ | ʃ ⟨sh⟩ | x | xʷ ⟨xw⟩ | |
| Nasal | m | n̪ ⟨n⟩ | | | nʲ ⟨ny⟩ | | | |
| Trill | | | r | | | | | |
| Lateral | | | l | | lʲ ⟨ly⟩ | | | |
| Approximant | | | | | j ⟨y⟩ | | w | |

Scholarly work describes some phonemes above as alveo-palatal, despite the fricative and affricate being normally described as post-alveolar and the approximant as palatal. However, this grouping is consistent with other Americanist works of the time.

All obstruents in Tiipai are voiceless.

The phoneme /s/ in Jamul Tiipai is described as apico-dental.

Consonants /m/ and /n/ can be syllabic when in, respectively, a post-stress position following a consonant and in the initial position followed by /t/ or /t͡ʃ/ and any vowel besides /ə/.

/k/ becomes [q] when following a stressed, non-front vowel.

In a post-stress position, /t͡ʃ/ becomes [tʲ], while /x/ becomes [ɰ].

In final position, /r/ is realized as [ɾ].

There is one native word, nyímbi, that contains the voiced bilabial plosive /b/. Analysis of the term is complicated, so since the phoneme is only found in one native word, /b/ is not included in the above table.

Both /j/ and /w/ form diphthongs with all possible preceding stressed vowels, while /j/ sometimes forms diphthongs with preceding /a/ and /aː/ in unstressed positions.

=== Stress and syllable structure ===
As is typical of other Yuman languages, Tiipai words contain a single stressed syllable, always corresponding to the grammatical root. As prefixes vastly outnumber suffixes, stress is usually placed on the final syllable. Syllables are (C)V(C), where the V may be short or long.

Biconsonantal clusters are permitted initially, medially, and finally, while triconsonantal clusters are permitted initially and medially. No clusters of a dental and alveolar consonant are permitted and identical consonants cannot form a cluster, with the exception of /ch/. Attested final consonant clusters are (with dashes separating phonemes): /m-lly/, /m-p/, /p-sh/, /r-s/, /y-lly/, /y-p/, /y-k/. Attested vowel clusters include: /a-aa/, /aa-a/, /aa-aa/, /aa-ii/, /uu-u/, /uu-uu/.

The glottal stop /ʔ/ is only found in stem-initial or root-initial positions, or immediately proceeding a root, where it is followed by a stressed phoneme. The labialized velar consonants are only found syllable-initially in the pre-stress position.

=== Phonological processes ===
Roughly six major rules governing phonemic sound changes have been posited in Tiipai, listed below. Note that /e/ deletion may occur in other environments to restore initial and medial clusters, but since this behavior is not fully regular, it is not described as a rule below.

- Clusters of glottal stops are reduced: /s-aʼ-ʼuull/ → saʼuull 'sink, dishpan'.
- High vowels become glides before /a/ and /aa/: /uu-aʼ-niw/ → waʼniw 'gaming place', /ii-aʼ-ma-ch/ → yaʼmach 'powwow'.
- Vowels become shortened when preceding a glottal stop or when pre-stress and not adjacent to the root: /ny-aa-ʼ-aam/ → nyaʼaam 's/he made me go away', /aa-ch-uu-much/ → achuumuch 'to kill (pl)'.
- /sh/ assimilates to /s/ preceding a dental stop: /sh-t-uu-maay/ → stuumaay 'to seek (pl)'.
- /e/ is inserted in a pre-stress position between a non-syllabic segment and a consonant: /m-sh-yaay/ → mesheyaay 'to be afraid'.
- /e/ is deleted in clusters consisting of a sibilant followed by a stop other than /kw/ or /ʼ/ or clusters beginning with the glottal stop: /sh-puk/ → shpuk 'to lay head on pillow', /ch-aʼ-saw/ → chaʼsaw 'food'.

== Morphology ==
Tiipai employs mostly prefixes, though some suffixes are used frequently. Affixes are almost always a single syllable, and many consist of only a single phoneme.

=== Verbs ===
Verbs bear the majority of morphology in Tiipai, divided between lexical affixes and affixes representing derivational and inflection processes.

==== Lexical affixes ====
Most basic verb stems in Tiipai are made up of the root and one or more lexical affixes. These lexical affixes are not productive, and in many cases their meaning is not clear. However, they are meaningful in the sense that a common semantic notion can be found in a percentage of the verbs that bear the affix, and in many cases the underlying roots never appear without these lexical affixes. However, there are two lexical suffixes that express direction whose meanings are transparent: -m 'away' and -k 'towards'.

Additionally, lexical reduplication occurs in Tiipai to form verb stems. In 17 instances, full reduplication occurs, with the stress falling on the second syllable: chilchil 'to be too tight (clothing)'. In five instances, full reduplication occurs except the vowel of the first syllable is reduced to /e/: kellykully 'to peek in'.

==== Derivational morphology ====
For all derivational processes in Tiipai, there are several morphemes that, unless indicated otherwise, can each independently and optionally express their corresponding morphological function. For example, the causative is formed using any amount of the following affixes, ordered by linear order within the verb:

- t-, ch-, or sh-
- Lexical prefix(es)
- aa- or uu-
- Root (potentially with a change in vowel length)
- -ch
- -a

As mentioned above, apart from affixes separated by or in the list above, these affixes can co-exist—for example, stative verbs often take t-, aa-, and -a: xelkay 'to be smooth' → texelaakaya 'to make smooth'. Furthermore, some affixes only appear in certain phonological conditions— -ch only appears when the stem ends in a stressed /a/, /aa/, or /i/: mi 'to cry' → taamiicha 'to make cry'. The causative, like other derivational processes, can also cause changes within the stem itself: in 17 cases, lexical affixes are lost, while an intrusive /k/ appears in five cases, along with other miscellaneous phenomena.

There are two types of plural verbs in Tiipai: plural subject forms, denoting multiple subjects, and distributive action forms, denoting multiple objects. Plural subject forms are formed as follows:

- a-
- Lexical prefix(es)
- ch-
- n- or t-
- Lexical prefix(es)
- uu-
- Root (potentially with a change in vowel length)
- Lexical suffix, -ch, or -p
- -a

In this derivational process, vowel length change within the root is actually the most productive process, occurring in 72% of stems: llyewak 'to punch' → llyewaaka. A few further notes: the position of ch- is not always predictable, n- frequently occurs with verbs of motion, and -ch and -p occur only with stems ending in a vowel. Like the causative, loss of lexical affixes and an intrusive /k/ may also occur. Distributive action verbs are formed similarly, except the only processes that may occur include prefixation of ch-, suffixation of -ch, and root vowel length change. For distributive action formation, ch- has an allomorph t-, realized following sibilants: s'aw 'to give birth' → ste'aaw 'to give birth on several occasions'.

Other derivational processes that occur on the verb include:

- nominalization on both the subject (referring to a person who habitually or professionally performs the action) and the oblique (referring to a patient, instrument, or location associated with the action)
- formation of frequency words
- formation of relative stems, or special stems for some verbs when appearing in relative clauses
- formation of irrealis stems for some verbs
- formation of stative stems for some verbs

==== Inflectional morphology ====
Although a few verbs inflect analytically via an auxiliary, most verbs in Tiipai inflect for person using the following prefixes:

- 1st person: '- before stems beginning with a stressed vowel, ∅ elsewhere
- 2nd person: m-
- Imperative: k-
- 3rd person: u-, uu-, or w- before root initial stems, ∅ elsewhere

Special prefixes are used in some combinations when transitive verbs have 1st or 2nd person objects:

| | | Subject | | | |
| | | 1st person | 2nd person | Imperative | 3rd person |
|---|---|---|---|---|---|
| Object | 1st person | | nyem- | nyek...'- | ny...'- |
| Object | 2nd person | ny- | | | m- |

The "..." indicates intervening lexical prefixes: nyekeka'naapa 'tell me!'.

Finally, there exist special person prefixes for relative clauses in the subject position:

- 1st person: ny-
- 2nd person: m-
- 3rd person: ∅

=== Nouns ===
Albeit much less than verbs, nouns also bear some morphology in Tiipai. Only eight nouns in Tiipai bear plural morphology, and all of these seem to have originated as verbs—this paucity is also likely partly due to the fact that expressing plurality is not even obligatory on verbs. Noun pluralization actually closely resembles the causative, but with only the prefixes ch- and aa- accompanying suffixes -ch and -a and root vowel length change. The two major instances in which nouns take affixes are possession and case.

==== Possession ====
Tiipai distinguishes two types of possession: inalienable and alienable. Inalienable possession applies to body parts, some items of clothing, pechaay 'daughter (man's term)', aa 'language', shiimull 'tribe, last name', and keyaw 'behalf'. The following person affixes appear on the possessed nouns:

- 1st person: ∅
- 2nd person: m-
- 3rd person: ∅

All other nouns are considered alienably possessed. They inflect similarly, except with the additional prefix ny- appearing after the person affixes: menya'naak 'your chair'.

==== Case ====
The following markings indicating case are suffixed to the end of the noun phrase:

- -ch: subject case
- ∅: absolute case
- -i: locative case, realized as the allomorph -y following a vowel
- -m: instrumental, allative, or comitative case
- -k: ablative or locative case
- -lly: inessive or illative case

== Syntax ==
The default word order of Tiipai is (S)(O)V. Overt expression of nouns is optional and functions only to specify or "lexicalize", as person for subjects and objects is marked on the verb, as discussed above. If an oblique noun appears, it appears between the subject and the object. For ditransitive verbs, the linear ordering of the two objects is based on an animacy hierarchy: (1st person > 2nd person > 3rd person animate > 3rd person inanimate). This animacy hierarchy also determines which object is marked for person on the verb.

Deviations from the default word order are fairly common in discourse. Some attested examples are objects preceding subjects so as to be topicalized and subjects following verbs when they are lexicalized as an "afterthought" to the statement.

=== Noun phrase ===
Lexical demonstratives within Tiipai are typically used for spatial deixis, and they do not inflect for plurality. Three lexical demonstratives are used: peya 'this one, these', nyip 'that one, those (middle distance)', and puu 'that one, those (further away)'. There is also a demonstrative clitic -pu, often used more for textual deixis or marking the ends of complex noun phrases.

Multi-word noun phrases are rare, but do occur in certain contexts. A noun followed by the demonstrative peya is used to specify a referent ('this noun'), while a genitive construction is ordered with the noun representing the whole followed by the noun representing the part: armewil laventaan (car window) 'windshield'. Additionally, in possessive constructions, the owner precedes the possessed noun, which is inflected for alienability and person as discussed above.

=== Case marking ===
The case system of Tiipai is nominative-accusative, although different names have been traditionally used for these cases. Subjects of both transitive and intransitive verbs are marked by the subject case, while objects appear in absolute case. Case marking is obligatory on demonstratives and noun phrases marked with -pu, but is optional elsewhere.

=== Switch reference ===
Tiipai exhibits, like other Yuman languages, a switch-reference system, with different suffixes depending on the mood of the dependent clause. These suffixes are cliticized to the dependent clause verb, and can express simultaneous or sequential events. When the dependent clause is in the realis mood, the suffixes are as follows:

- -ch: same-subject
- -m: different-subject
- -chm different-subject

There are two different-subject suffixes in the realis, but they appear in different contexts. -m is used for subsequent verbs in switch-reference chains, verbs involving time or weather, and in some auxiliary constructions:

nya-naa-ch xa tuu-yak-m nekxap netepach
when-go.PL-SS water 3-be.lying-DS enter.PL come.out.PL
'As they went on, they went through some water. (There was water and they went in and out of it.)'

nyaam lasdyees-m shuumaap-x
really be.10:00-DS sleep.PL-IRR
'It's ten o'clock, let's sleep.'

-chm is used elsewhere.

may xa ke-si xemaaw 'iimatt-chm
NEG water IMP-drink not be.dirty-DS
'Don't drink the water, it is dirty."'

When the dependent verb is in the irrealis mood, the suffixes are as follows:

- -k: same-subject
- -km different-subject

In this case, the reference clause bears the irrealis morphology:

'-aa-k kwa'kuy-pu '-iny-x-s
1-go-IRR.SS old.woman-DEM 1-give-IRR-EMP
'I will go and give it to the old woman.'

For both realis and irrealis moods, in cases of overlapping reference, such as a group as the subject of the first clause and a member of the group as the subject of the second clause, or with weather verbs, either same-subject or different-subject markers may be used. Time verbs, on the other hand, are always different-subject. This phenomenon is typical of other Yuman languages. Furthermore, all switch reference markings are optional.

== Sample text ==
The following is a Ja'a Tiipai translation of the North Wind and the Sun:

Orthographic: Ttja ñak ña ñuup ttaniu jwaklj uwiu m’ei sper jan, ñapom kwamp ajkei maatt tupitt ttuju. Ñapuum uwei m’ei kwamp tupitt puñutitt ñip ksper jan. ttja ñak psui sper war, tupitt pu utip jui ña psui sper jan kwampt kwam chawin jan tupitt. Ttja ñaak anmak ña, ñat ñapuum sper jan kwam tupitt utip chot. Ñapuum ttjatt ñak ujau ñath mar.

Broad IPA transcription: /txa ɲak ɲa ɲu:p ta’niu xwakɬ uwiu mʔei sper xan ‖ ɲa’pom kwamp ax’kei ma:t t̪u’pit tu’ju ‖ ɲa’pu:m u’wei mʔei kwamp t̪u’pit puɲu’t̪it ɲip ksper xan ‖ txa ɲak psui sper war ‖ t̪u’pit pu u’t̪ip xui ɲa psui sper xan kwampt kwam ʃa’win xan t̪u’pit ‖ txa ɲa:k an’mak ɲa ‖ ɲat ɲa’pu:m sper xan kwam t̪u’pit u’t̪ip ʃot ‖ ɲa’pu:m txat ɲak u’jau ɲatj mar/

English translation: The North Wind and the Sun are fighting to see which of the two of them is stronger, when suddenly an elderly man wrapped in a thick cape passes by. They decide that whichever makes the man remove his cape is the strongest. The North Wind begins to blow with great force, but after blowing forcefully, the elderly man clings to his cape. The North Wind stops, [and] the Sun. The Sun shines brightly, and immediately the old man removes his cape. So the North Wind recognizes that the Sun is stronger.
