= Charles Hayward (cricketer) =

Australian cricketer

Personal information
- Born: 6 June 1867; Stepney, South Australia
- Died: 2 February 1934 (aged 66); Adelaide, South Australia
- Source: Cricinfo, 6 August 2020

Charles Hayward (6 June 1867 – 2 February 1934) was an Australian cricketer. He played in three first-class matches for South Australia in 1891/92.

== See also ==
- List of South Australian representative cricketers
