= Cochimí language =

Extinct Yuman language of Baja California

Cochimí
- Laymón
- Native to: Mexico
- Region: Baja California
- Ethnicity: Cochimí people
- Extinct: early 20th century
- Language family: Yuman–Cochimí: Cochimí

Language codes
- ISO 639-3: coj
- Glottolog: coch1272
- ELP: Laimón

Cochimí is an extinct language which was once the language of the greater part of Baja California, as attested by Jesuit documents of the 18th century. It seems to have become extinct around the beginning of the 20th century. (Modern "Cochimi"-speakers are actually speakers of Kumiai.) There were two main dialects, northern and southern; the dividing line was approximately at Misión San Ignacio Kadakaamán, in the north of present-day Baja California Sur.

The Jesuit texts establish that the language was related to the Yuman languages of the Colorado River region. It is thought to be the most divergent language of the family, which is generally called Yuman–Cochimí to reflect this. Based on glottochronology studies, the separation between Cochimi and the Yuman languages is believed to have occurred about 1000 BC.

== Phonology ==
The phonology of the Cochimí language is likely as follows:

=== Consonants ===
		Bilabial	Alveolar	Palatal	Velar		Glottal
		Bilabial	Alveolar	Palatal	plain	lab.	Glottal
Plosive/ Affricate	voiceless	p	t	tʃ	k	kʷ	ʔ
Plosive/ Affricate	voiced	b	d		ɡ		
Fricative			s	ʃ (Note: could have been disputed.)	x	xʷ	
Nasal		m	n	ɲ	ŋ		
Lateral			l				
Approximant				j		w	

Voiced consonants likely could have been either separate phonemes or allophones of voiceless sounds.

=== Vowels ===
	Front	Back
Close	i	u
Mid	(e)	(o)
Open	a	

Mid vowels may be alternated with close vowel sounds.

== Sample text ==
Following is the Lord's Prayer in the dialect of San Ignacio Kadakaamán, recorded by Francisco Javier Clavijero from the work of the missionaries Barco and Ventura, which has been lost.

Va-bappà amma-bang miamù,
ma-mang-à-juà huit maja tegem:
Amat-ma-thadabajuà ucuem:
Kem-mu-juà amma-bang vahi-mang amat-à-nang la-uahim.
Teguap ibang gual gùieng-à-vit-à-juà iban-à-nang packagit:
muht-pagijuà abadakegem, machi uayecg-juà packabaya-guem:
Kazet-à-juangamue-gnit-pacum:
guang mayi-acg packabanajam.
Amén.
