= Yuman–Cochimí languages =

Language family

Yuman–Cochimí
- Yuman
- Geographic distribution: Colorado River basin and Baja California
- Linguistic classification: Hokan ?: Yuman–Cochimí
- Subdivisions: Cochimí †; Kiliwa; Core Yuman

Language codes
- Glottolog: coch1271
- Pre-contact distribution of Yuman–Cochimí languages

The Yuman–Cochimí languages are a family of languages spoken in Baja California, northern Sonora, southern California, and western Arizona. Cochimí is no longer spoken as of the late 18th century, and most other Yuman languages are threatened.

== Classification ==
There are approximately a dozen Yuman languages. The extinct Cochimí, attested from the 18th century, was identified after the rest of the family had been established, and was found to be more divergent. The resulting family was therefore called Yuman–Cochimí, with Yuman being the extra-Cochimí languages.

- Yuman–Cochimí
  - Cochimí † (Northern Cochimí and Southern Cochimí may have been distinct languages)
    - "Robinia"
  - Kiliwa
  - Core Yuman
    - Delta–California Yuman
      - Ipai (a.k.a. ʼIipay, Northern Diegueño)
      - Kumeyaay (a.k.a. Central Diegueño, Campo)
      - Tipai (a.k.a. Southern Diegueño, Huerteño)
      - Kwatl (a.k.a. Kuʼalh)
      - Cocopah (a.k.a. Cucapá; cf. Kahwan, Halyikwamai)
    - River Yuman
      - Quechan (a.k.a. Yuma)
      - Maricopa (a.k.a. Pii-Paash)
      - Mojave
      - Halchidhoma †
    - Pai
      - Yavapai
      - Havasupai-Hualapai (a.k.a. Northern Yuman)
        - Hualapai dialect (a.k.a. Walapai)
        - Havasupai dialect
      - Paipai (a.k.a. Akwaʼala; possibly distinct from the Upland Yuman language only at the dialect level)

Cochimí and Halchidhoma are extinct. Cucapá is the Spanish name for the Cocopa. Diegueño is the Spanish name for Ipai–Kumeyaay–Tipai, now often referred to collectively as Kumeyaay. Upland Yuman consists of several mutually intelligible dialects spoken by the politically distinct Yavapai, Hualapai, and Havasupai.

== Proto-language ==
Proto-Yuman
- Reconstruction of: Yuman languages
- Lower-order reconstructions: Proto-Yuman

=== Urheimat ===
Mauricio Mixco of the University of Utah points to a relative lack of reconstructible Proto-Yuman terms for aquatic phenomena as evidence against a coastal, lacustrine, or riverine Urheimat.

=== Reconstruction ===
Proto-Yuman reconstructions by Mixco (1978):

gloss	Proto-Yuman
be	*wi/*yu
be located (sg)	*wa
belly	*pxa; *p-xa
big	*tay
bird	*č-sa
body hair	*mi(ʔ)
bone	*ak
breasts	*ñ-maːy
cat	*-mi(ʔ)
causative	*x-
chief man	*-pa/*(ma)
chief, lord	*-pa/*ma
cold	*x-čur
cry	*mi(ʔ)
dance	*-ma(ʔ)
daughter	*p-čay
die	*pi
die (sg)	*pi
do	*wi/uːy
do; make	*wi/*uy
dog	*(č)-xat
dove	*k-wi(ʔ)
drink	*(č)-si; *si ?
ear	*ṣma(k)l ~ *ṣmal(k)
earth, place	*ʔ-mat
eat (hard food)	*č-aw
eat (soft food)	*ma
extinguish	*spa
eye	*yu(w)
face	*yu(w) (p)-xu
fall	*-nal
father	*n-ʔay; *-ta; *-ku ?
feather	*-waR
fire	*ʔ-ʔa(ː)w
give	*wi; *ʔi
he	*ña/*ya-
head	*ʔi(y)
hear	*kʷi(ː)
heaven, sky	*ʔ-ma(ʔ)y
horn	*kʷa ?
hot	*paR
house	*ʔ-wa(ʔ)
husband	*miːy
imperative prefix	*k-
irrealis	*-x(a)
kill	*pi
leaf	*ṣmak; *smaR
lie (be prone)	*yak
locative	*wa-l
locative (illative)	*-l
locative (thither)	*-m
man, male	*-miː(y); *maː(y)
man, person	*-pa/*ma
mother	*-tay; *-siy
mountain lion	*-miʔ tay
mountain sheep	*ʔ-mu(w)
mouth	*(y-)a
name	*maR
navel	*-pu
neck/nape	*iː-(m)puk ?
non-present aspect	*t
nose	*(p-)xu
object, plural	*pa
object, unspec. (anim.)	*ñ-
perceive	*kʷi
possessive prefix (inal.)	*ñ
prefixes (trans.)	*-, *m, *Ø
priest	*maː(y)
pronominal prefixes (stative)	*ñ, *m-, *w-
pronominal subject	*ʔ-, *m-, *Ø
rabbit	*pxar
reed	*xta
relative pronoun	*ña-/*ya
relativizer	*kʷ-
salt	*-ʔiR (< *s-ʔiR)
say	*ʔi
shaman	*-maː(y)
sit	*waː
skunk	*-xʷiw
sleep	*ṣma
son (w.s.)	*s-ʔaːw ?
star	*xmṣi
subject suffix	*-č; *-m
sun, day	*paR
that	*-ña/*-ya
there	*ña/*ya
thing, something	*ʔ-č
third person	*ña-/*ya
this	*p-u
thorn	*ʔ-ta(ː)t
three	*x-muk
to blow	*p-č/sul
tongue	*ʔimpal; *(y)pal; *-paR
two	*x-wak
water	*-xa(ʔ); *si
we	*ña-p
wife	*ku/*ki
wing	*waR
woman	*ki/*ku; *siñʔak
word	*maR
yes	*xaː

== Bibliography ==
- Campbell, Lyle (1997). American Indian Languages: The Historical Linguistics of Native America. Oxford University Press.
- Goddard, Ives (1996). "Introduction". In Goddard, Ives (ed.). Handbook of North American Indians. Vol. 17: Languages. Washington, DC: Smithsonian Institution. pp. 1–16.
- Kendall, Martha B. (1983). "Yuman languages". In Ortiz, Alfonso (ed.). Handbook of North American Indians. Vol. 10: Southwest. Washington, DC: Smithsonian Institution. pp. 4–12.
- Langdon, Margaret (1990). "Diegueño: how many languages?". In Redden, James E. (ed.). Proceedings of the 1990 Hokan–Penutian Language Workshop. Occasional Papers in Linguistics. Vol. 15. Carbondale: University of Southern Illinois. pp. 184–190.
- Mithun, Marianne (1999). The Languages of Native North America. Cambridge: Cambridge University Press. ISBN 0-521-23228-7.
- Mixco, Mauricio J. (2006). "The indigenous languages". In Laylander, Don; Moore, Jerry D. (eds.). The Prehistory of Baja California: Advances in the Archaeology of the Forgotten Peninsula. pp. 24–41. ISBN 978-0-8130-2965-8.
