= William Clifford Massey =

American anthropologist

William Clifford Massey (1917–1974) was an anthropologist who played a key role in the study of the prehistory of the Baja California Peninsula in Mexico. His scientific contributions included archaeological surveys, excavations, and the documentation of previous collections, as well as detailed analyses of ethnohistoric and linguistic evidence bearing of the region's prehistory.

== Early life, education, and academic career ==
Massey was born in San Mateo, California on June 17, 1917. He began as a student at the University of California, Berkeley in the late 1930s, but his studies were interrupted during World War II when he worked as a steamfitter in Richmond, California. After the war, he resumed his studies, focusing on the anthropology and archaeology of Baja California. He received his Ph.D. in 1955 with a dissertation on the Culture History in the Cape Region of Baja California.

Massey held teaching positions at Merritt College in Oakland, California, the University of Washington in Seattle, the University of Florida in Gainesville, and Texas Christian University in Fort Worth. He directed small anthropological field schools in Baja California Sur for the University of Washington and the Escuela Nacional de Antropología e Historia in 1953-1954. He died during a fishing trip in Placer County, California on June 27, 1974.

== Contributions ==
Among Massey's contributions were numerous articles on Latin America. However, his primary research focus was Baja California. He published the first professional peninsula-wide overview of Baja California archaeology, based on field survey work, in 1947. He synthesized ethnohistoric information on the distributions of the peninsula's native languages in 1949. His Ph.D. dissertation remained unpublished but presented the results of archaeological surveys and excavations in Baja California Sur's Cape Region with unprecedented detail and interpretive rigor. Two versions of an article addressed the issue of the continued use of the spear-thrower and dart into the early historic period in some areas of Baja California Sur. He reported and analyzed previous archaeological collections by the 20th-century Jesuit César Castaldí in the southern half of the peninsula and by the 19th-century naturalist Edward Palmer at Bahía de los Ángeles in the north. Two articles presented interpretive overviews of the peninsula's prehistory. Massey provided the initial archaeological definitions of Baja California's Las Palmas and Comondú complexes.
