= San José del Cabo =

- City
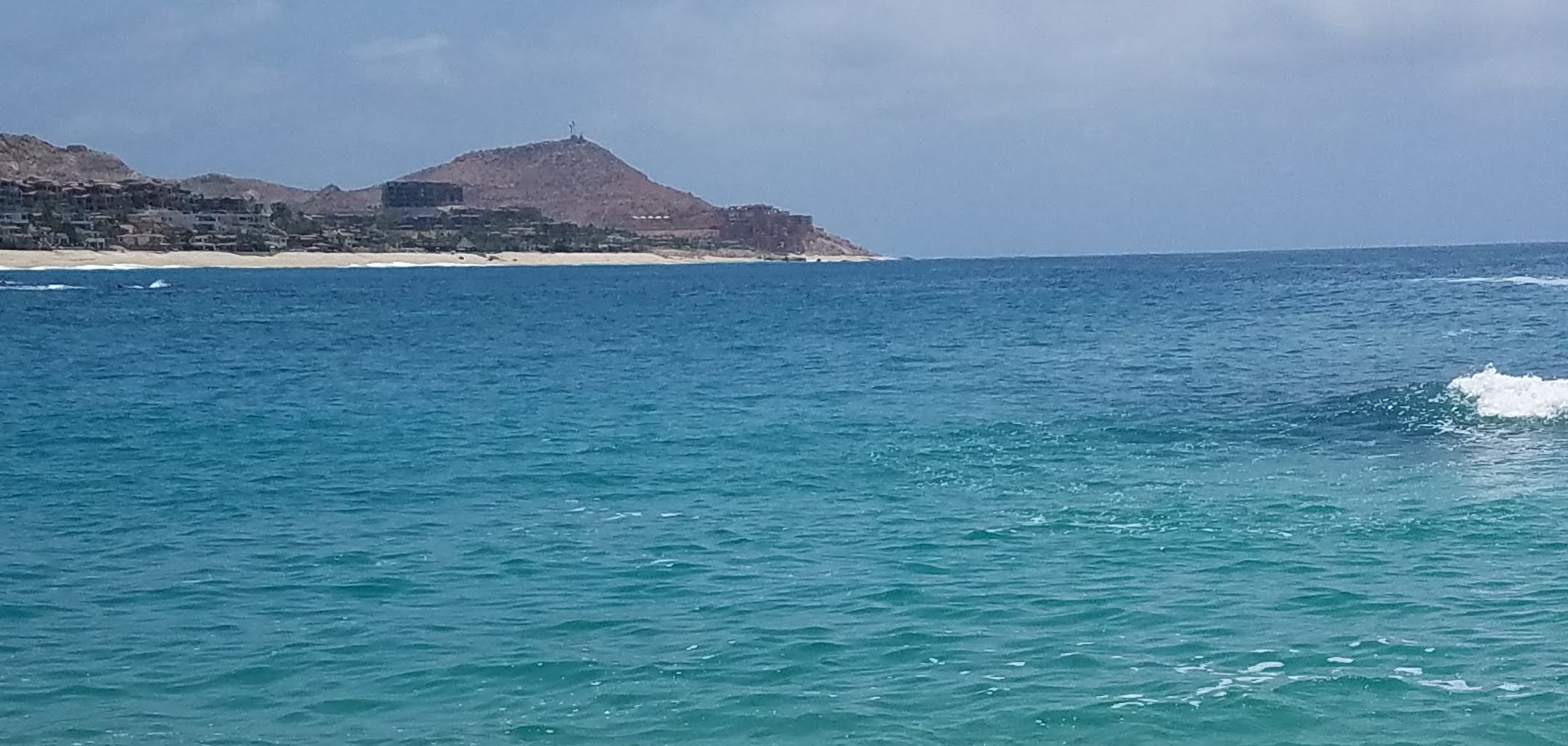
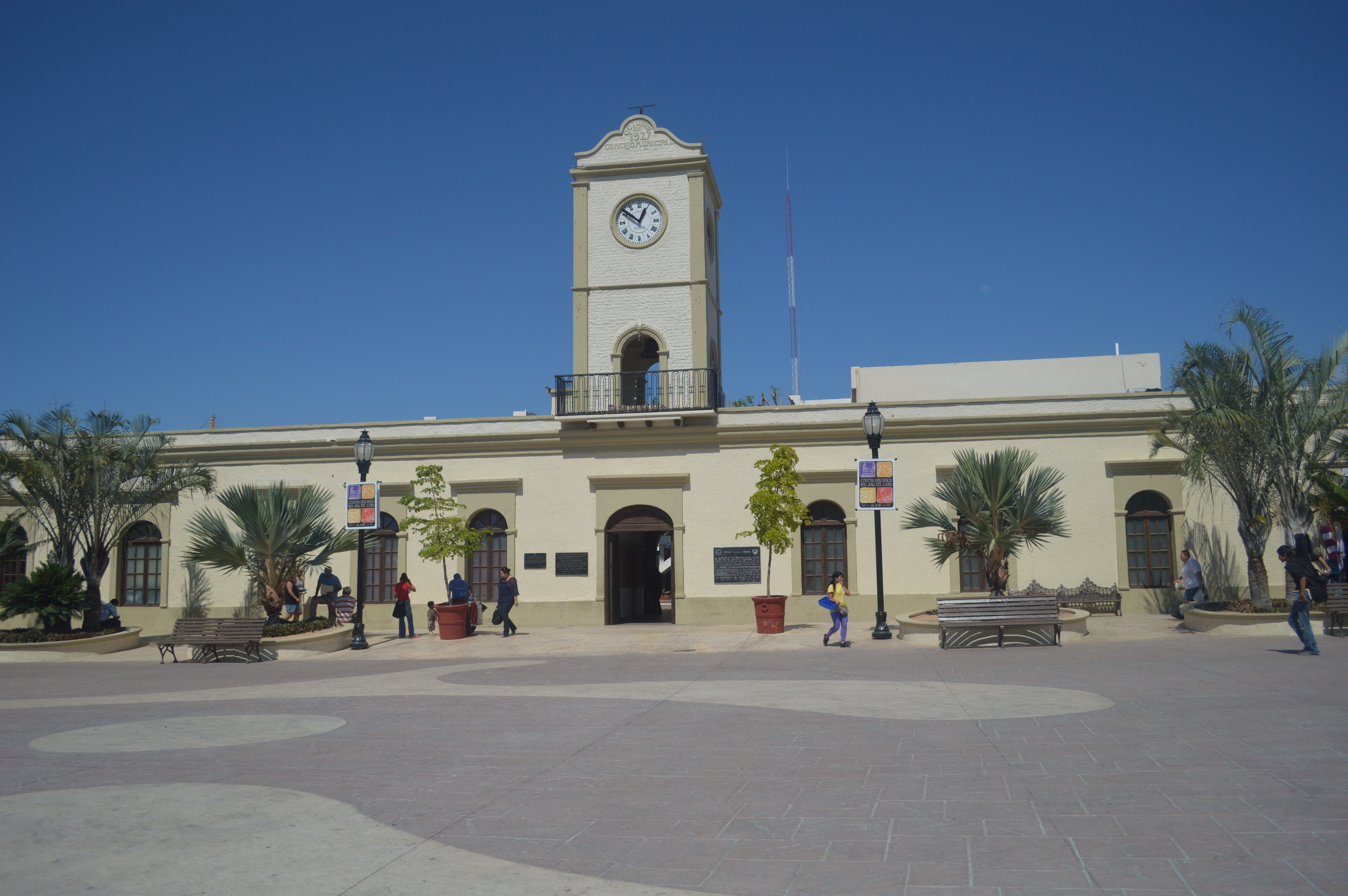
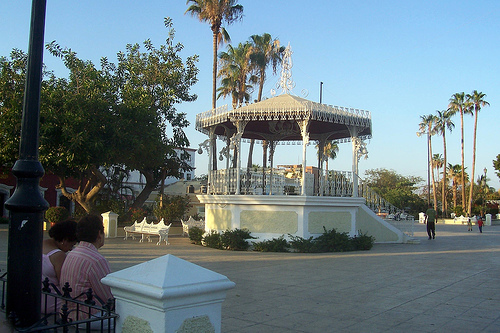
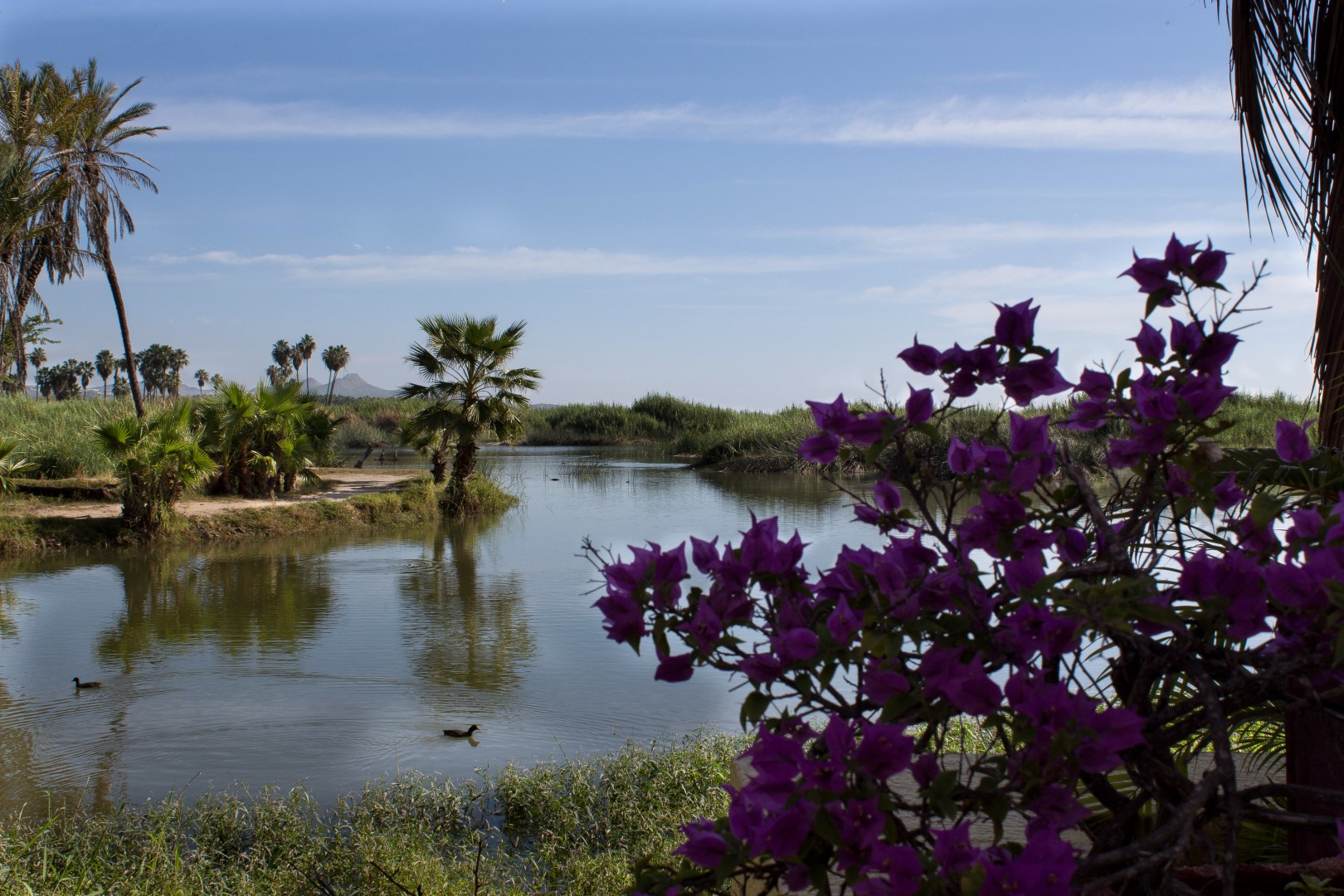
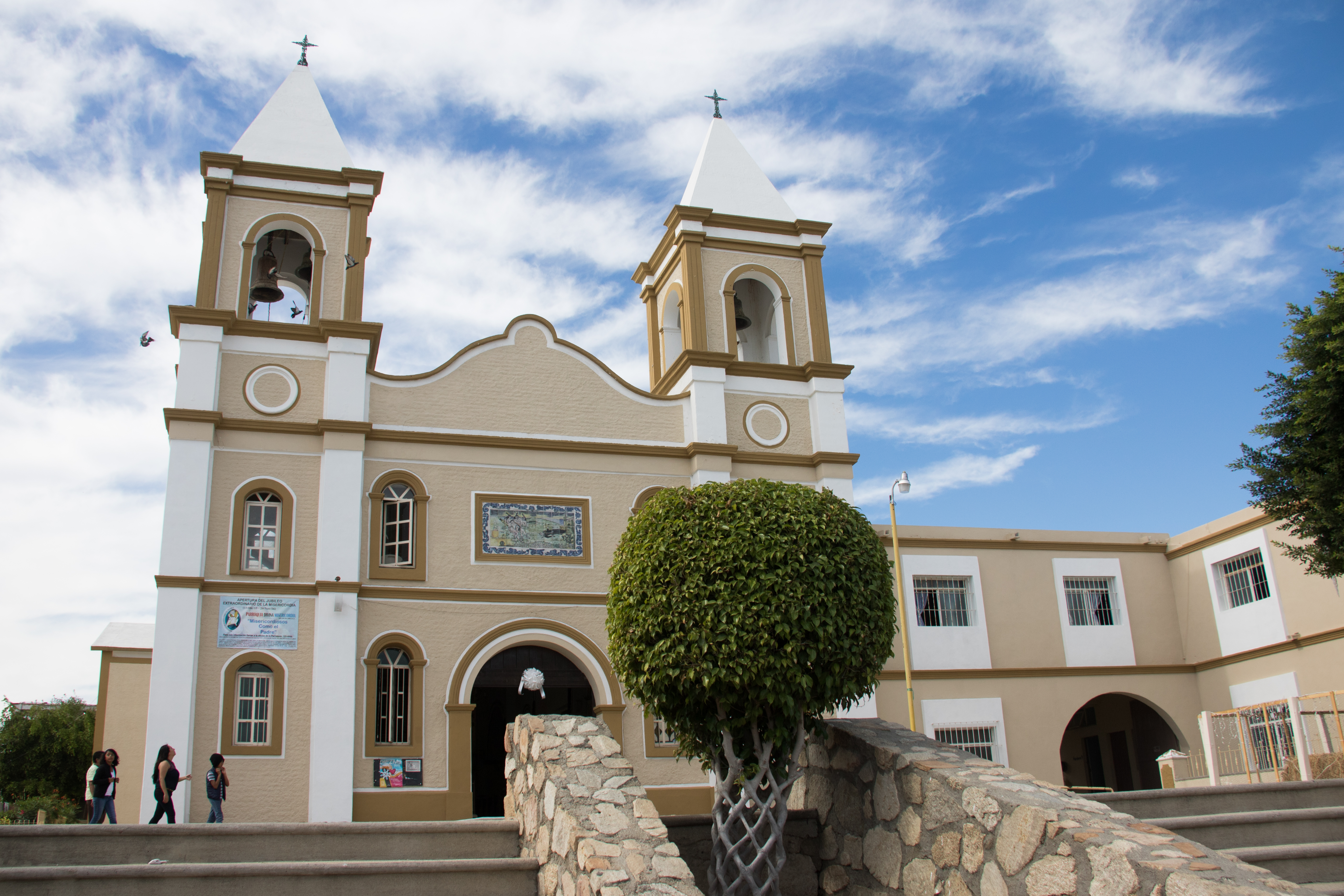
- Top: San José del Cabo coastline; Middle: Los Cabos Town Hall, San José del Cabo main plaza; San José Estuary, Misión Estero de las Palmas de San José del Cabo Añuití

- Location in Baja California Sur
- Coordinates: 23°03′41″N 109°42′29″W
- Country: Mexico
- State: Baja California Sur
- Municipality: Los Cabos

Area
  - Total: 176.5 km^{2} (68.16 sq mi)
- Elevation: 45 m (148 ft)

Population (2020)
  - Total: 136,285
  - Density: 772.0/km^{2} (1,999/sq mi)
- Time zone: UTC−07:00 (Zona Pacífico)

San José del Cabo (Spanish pronunciation: [saŋ xoˈse ðel ˈkaβo], Saint Joseph of the Cape) is a coastal city located on the Gulf of California coast, near the southern tip of the Mexican state of Baja California Sur. San José del Cabo is situated on the edge of a shallow bay, some 32 kilometres (20 mi) northeast of Cabo San Lucas, a city with which it shares the title of Los Cabos.

San José del Cabo is the seat of the Los Cabos Municipality. The city had a population of 136,285 at the 2020 census. It and Cabo San Lucas are served by Los Cabos International Airport.

== People and history ==
The 2020 census found that, at the time, 136,285 people lived in the city. Together with neighboring Cabo San Lucas, it forms a major tourist hub, with over 900,000 hotel guests in 2011.

The indigenous Pericu name for San Jose del Cabo was Añiñi. The Misión Estero de las Palmas de San José del Cabo Añuití was founded in 1730 on the west bank of the nearby Río San José, which flows into the largest body of freshwater in Baja California Sur, an estuary, after flowing largely subterraneanly for 39.1 kilometres (24.3 mi) from its origin in the Sierra de la Laguna (Laguna Mountains). For centuries, the river has provided a source of freshwater for the locals and animals of this coastal desert known today as San José del Cabo; it was once used as a source of freshwater for Spanish galleons traveling back from the Philippines. The river once flowed above-ground until the beginning of the 20th century, due to anthropogenic causes. A one-kilometer long sandbar separates the estuary from what early Spanish explorers, including Sebastián Vizcaíno, called the Bahía de San Bernabé (Bay of Saint Burnaby), now known as Bahía de San José del Cabo.

San José del Cabo is one of two places where the critically endangered rice rat Oryzomys peninsulae has survived.

== Geography ==
=== Climate ===
San José del Cabo, like almost all of the Baja California peninsula, has a tropical desert climate (Köppen BWh). The area, however, does receive slightly more rainfall than most areas further north, mainly due to tropical cyclones occasionally approaching from the south. These storms can bring very heavy precipitation events, such as the roughly 340 millimetres (13.4 in) on 1 September 1998, or the 316 millimetres (12.4 in) on 3 November 1993. Overall, rainfall events here are some of the most spontaneous anywhere in the world due to the cyclone influence, and many years can pass without significant rain, at all.

The sea experiences lows of 72–73 °F (22–23 °C) in winter, and highs of 77–84 °F (25–29 °C) during the summer months.

Average Sea Temperature
Jan	Feb	Mar	Apr	May	Jun	Jul	Aug	Sep	Oct	Nov	Dec
73 °F 23 °C	72 °F 22 °C	72 °F 22 °C	72 °F 22 °C	73 °F 23 °C	77 °F 25 °C	81 °F 27 °C	84 °F 29 °C	84 °F 29 °C	84 °F 29 °C	81 °F 27 °C	77 °F 25 °C

Climate data for San José del Cabo (1991-2020)
Month	Jan	Feb	Mar	Apr	May	Jun	Jul	Aug	Sep	Oct	Nov	Dec	Year
Record high °C (°F)	37.0 (98.6)	38.0 (100.4)	39.0 (102.2)	39.0 (102.2)	40.0 (104.0)	38.0 (100.4)	39.0 (102.2)	42.0 (107.6)	42.0 (107.6)	41.0 (105.8)	40.0 (104.0)	39.0 (102.2)	42.0 (107.6)
Mean daily maximum °C (°F)	27.6 (81.7)	28.3 (82.9)	29.6 (85.3)	30.6 (87.1)	32.7 (90.9)	34.2 (93.6)	35.4 (95.7)	35.4 (95.7)	34.6 (94.3)	33.8 (92.8)	31.6 (88.9)	28.1 (82.6)	31.8 (89.2)
Daily mean °C (°F)	19.6 (67.3)	20.1 (68.2)	21.2 (70.2)	22.5 (72.5)	24.8 (76.6)	27.1 (80.8)	29.2 (84.6)	29.3 (84.7)	28.6 (83.5)	26.9 (80.4)	24.0 (75.2)	20.7 (69.3)	24.5 (76.1)
Mean daily minimum °C (°F)	11.6 (52.9)	11.8 (53.2)	12.8 (55.0)	14.3 (57.7)	16.8 (62.2)	20.0 (68.0)	22.9 (73.2)	23.3 (73.9)	22.6 (72.7)	20.0 (68.0)	16.4 (61.5)	13.2 (55.8)	17.1 (62.8)
Record low °C (°F)	1.5 (34.7)	2.0 (35.6)	5.0 (41.0)	6.0 (42.8)	9.0 (48.2)	11.0 (51.8)	11.5 (52.7)	11.0 (51.8)	11.0 (51.8)	11.0 (51.8)	9.2 (48.6)	3.0 (37.4)	1.5 (34.7)
Average precipitation mm (inches)	4.7 (0.19)	5.5 (0.22)	1.0 (0.04)	0.1 (0.00)	0.1 (0.00)	1.7 (0.07)	12.9 (0.51)	85.2 (3.35)	167.8 (6.61)	27.1 (1.07)	42.4 (1.67)	7.0 (0.28)	355.5 (14.00)
Average precipitation days (≥ 0.1 mm)	0.8	0.7	0.1	0.0	0.1	0.3	1.2	3.6	4.5	1.6	1.0	0.5	14.4
Source: Servicio Meteorológico National

== Demographics ==
Historical population
Year	Pop.	±%
1990	13,302	—
1995	21,737	+63.4%
2000	31,102	+43.1%
2010	69,788	+124.4%
2015	93,069	+33.4%
2020	136,285	+46.4%

Many people from around the world live here, mostly from the USA, Canada, New Zealand, Australia, China, Korea, Japan, Spain, the United Kingdom, and other Latin American countries, among others. Some 80% of the population, however, are originally from other parts of Latin America (Mexico, Central and South America) thus enabling one to hear and experience several dialects of Spanish being spoken.

== See also ==
- Battle of San José del Cabo
- Siege of San José del Cabo
- Los Cabos Municipality
- Misión Estero de las Palmas de San José del Cabo Añuití
