= Silverwood Wildlife Sanctuary =

Coordinates: 32°55′N 116°53′W

Silverwood Wildlife Sanctuary is a nature preserve owned and operated by the San Diego Bird Alliance, formerly known as San Diego Audubon Society. Silverwood was set up in 1965 to preserve coastal chaparral and riparian woodland habitats. It is also a nature education facility for San Diego area schoolchildren and adults, and functions as part of a wildlife migration corridor.

== Geography ==
The Silverwood Wildlife Sanctuary is located in Lakeside, California, US, about 20 miles northeast of the city of San Diego. Its geographic coordinates are 116.88 degrees west longitude and 32.92 degrees north latitude. The topography consists of gentle to steep slopes, ranging in elevation from about 1,500 feet to 3,177 feet. There are frequent granitic boulder outcrops, and two seasonal streams.

== History ==
The first 85 acres of Silverwood were donated to the San Diego Bird Alliance by Society member Harry Woodward in 1965. Since then a resident naturalist and manager has lived on the site; the first was botanist Frank F. Gander (1899–1976). In 2013 it has grown through acquisitions to 757 acres, one hundred of which were lands transferred to SDBA from the federal Bureau of Land Management. The sanctuary is operated by a standing committee of the SDBA.

Artifacts found in the Sanctuary indicate that Kumeyaay Indians have lived in and around the site for thousands of years. Immediately north of Silverwood is the Barona Indian Reservation.

== Biological importance ==
Silverwood is located in a chaparral biological community. It is maintained as a pristine example of this habitat which is in decline in Southern California. As of 2013, 340 species of plants have been recorded on the Sanctuary. Silverwood served as a research area for the San Diego Natural History Museum’s book on the Flora of San Diego County.

Along the two wet-season streams on the Sanctuary are riparian woodlands and a small cienega (seasonal wetland), which provide botanical diversity to the sanctuary.

Mammals observed in the Silverwood Sanctuary include Bobcat, Mountain Lion, Ringtail, Coyote, Merriam Chipmunk, Mule Deer, Gray Fox, and some smaller mammals. About 160 species of birds have been recorded, and many nest there; the sanctuary is a popular bird-watching area. Reptiles include the threatened San Diego Horned Lizard and rare Lyre and Night snakes. Many species of both flora and fauna are designated as threatened, rare, or declining.

Three naturalists who researched at Silverwood, Frank F. Gander (1899–1976), Dr. Gerald Cosgrove and Dr. Andrew Olson, have had species of flora and fauna named for them, including Cylindropuntia ganderi, Lepechinia ganderi, Cryptantha ganderi, Caligus olsoni, Leuresthicola olsoni, Thaumameris cosgrovei.

== The 2003 Cedar Fire ==
On October 26, 2003, Cedar Fire, which burned 275,000 acres in San Diego County, incinerated the entire Sanctuary. It burned all structures on the Sanctuary, leaving the three employees temporarily homeless. Insurance payments allowed building a new fire resistant residence for the resident manager, which was completed in 2007. A grant was also obtained to construct a small solar powered nature center, also built in 2007 and named the Frank F. Gander Nature Education Center.

After the fire, new growth appeared on oak trees and root-ball chaparral species almost immediately, and wildflowers soon reappeared. Seven species of fire-follower wildflowers that had never been recorded at Silverwood before were found in the first few years after the fire. Fire-following birds such as Lazuli Bunting and Black-chinned Sparrow also soon arrived. By 2008, the various natural habitats at Silverwood had completely regenerated themselves following the fire.

== Nature education ==
Nature education, especially for schoolchildren, has been a major function of Silverwood since its creation in 1965. Silverwood is open to the public at no charge, with free nature education hikes offered every Sunday. In 2011, a fourth-grade nature education program was begun in cooperation with several of the local school districts. Except for the period immediately after the 2003 Cedar Fire, thousands of County residents have visited the Sanctuary every year to participate in its nature education programs.

A nature trail network of more than four miles (6.4 km) has been created at Silverwood. Two of the trails are marked with plant identification signs, and there is also a short ethnobotany trail, showing how various plants were used by Native Americans for food and medicinal purposes. Several of the trails include panoramic views.

The Frank Gander Nature Education Center contains flora and fauna displays, historical items, a reference library, and a collection of taxidermied wildlife. There is also a demonstration of landscaping with native plants, which require little or no watering.
