= Rock Haven, San Diego County, California =

32°54′30″N 116°55′34″W

Rock Haven was a settlement in east San Diego County, California. It was located at the foot of Mount Woodson, to the south of its summit, near present-day Route 67. An eponymous spring is located nearby.
