= Potato Chip Rock =

Tourist attraction in San Diego, California

Coordinates: 33°00′33″N 116°58′27″W

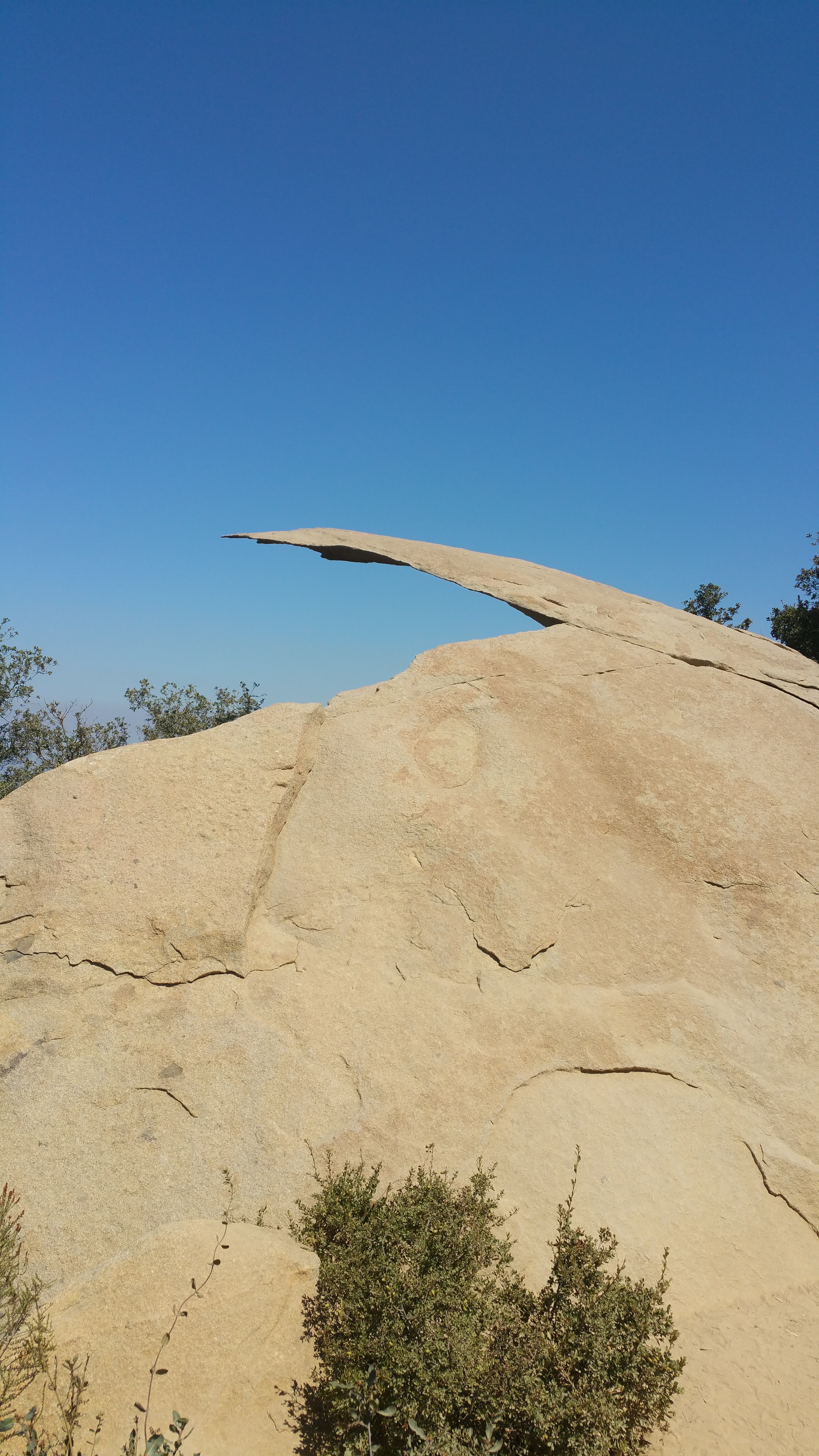
Potato Chip Rock

Potato Chip Rock is a natural tourist attraction near San Diego, California, named for its resemblance to a potato chip. The rock is thin and cantilevered over 14 feet. It is located on the summit of Mt. Woodson at an elevation between 2,700 and 2,800 ft, in an unincorporated part of San Diego County between Poway and Ramona.

== Access ==
Potato Chip Rock sits 100 feet below the summit of Mount Woodson. The hike to the rock takes an hour or two. One popular way to reach the rock is through a 6.6-mile round trip hike from the Lake Poway trailhead to the west. There are two other popular routes to the top that start on the east side of Mount Woodson. A short route begins from free parking areas along Route 67, with an entrance at 16310 Highway 67, and follows Mt. Woodson Road up to the rock. This 3.75-mile round-trip hike is paved and steep. The Fry-Kogel trail is the third route to the rock, and is about four miles long.

== In popular culture ==
The rock was used as an April Fools' Day prank by Poway mayor Steve Vaus in 2017. In a tweet, he wrote that part of the rock had snapped off and fallen into Lake Poway below. He even added a picture for "proof".
