= Dave Cripe =

American baseball player (born 1951)

- Third baseman
- Born: April 7, 1951 (age 75); Ramona, California, U.S.
- Batted: Right Threw: Right

MLB debut
- September 10, 1978, for the Kansas City Royals

Last MLB appearance
- October 1, 1978, for the Kansas City Royals

MLB statistics
- Batting average: .154
- Home runs: 0
- Runs batted in: 1
- Stats at Baseball Reference

Teams
- Kansas City Royals (1978)

David Gordon Cripe (born April 7, 1951) is an American former Major League Baseball player, known best for his three years of play with the Omaha Royals of the American Association. Cripe played for the Kansas City Royals for less than a month at the end of the 1978 season, leaving the team just before it competed in the 1978 American League Championship Series. He batted and threw right-handed.

== History ==
Cripe played college football as a punter in junior college at Mt. San Jacinto College. Despite a full scholarship offer from UNLV, Cripe chose to accept a partial football scholarship to William & Mary, where he also played college baseball. He finished his college baseball career at the University of La Verne. He was not drafted out of college but signed a free agent contract with the Kansas City Royals.

Cripe began his professional baseball career with the Billings Mustangs, joining as an amateur free agent; he continued his career at the San Jose Bees, then two years with the Jacksonville Suns followed by a move to the Triple-A Omaha Royals. According to the Kansas City Royals 1979 Media Guide, Cripe had "7 years of service in the Royals' minor league chain", including three years at the Omaha Royals, where he "played a significant role in the club's winning the American Association flag." He was added to the big league roster after an injury to George Brett.

Cripe was the manager of the Asheville Tourists in 1982. He is currently a physical education teacher in Moreno Valley, California.
