= Barona Resort & Casino =

Casino in Lakeside, California

Coordinates: 32.9398°N 116.873857°W

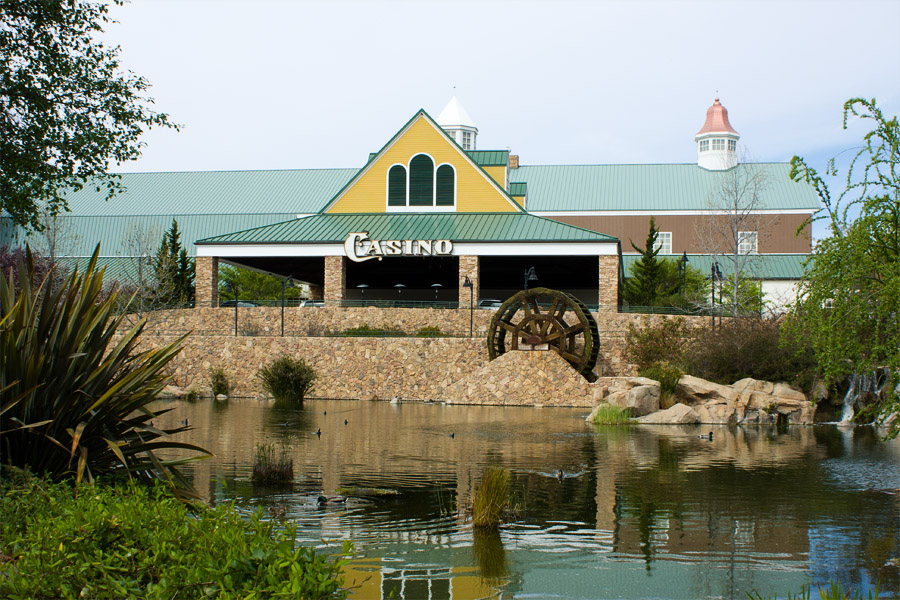
- Interactive map of Barona Resort & Casino
- Location: 1932 Wildcat Canyon Road Lakeside, California 92040-1546
- Opened: Originally opened 1993 as Barona BigTop
- Theme: Ranch
- No. of rooms: 300
- Gaming space: 300,000 sq ft (28,000 m^{2})
- Signature attractions: Barona Creek Golf Course
- Notable restaurants: Barona Oaks Steakhouse; Italian Cucina; Sage Café; Three Amigos World Famous Street Tacos; Feisty Kate’s Burgers and Malts; The Pizza Place; HoWan Noodle Shop
- Casino type: Land
- Owner: Barona Group of Capitan Grande Band of Mission Indians
- Website: http://www.barona.com

Barona Resort & Casino is an Indian casino on the Barona Indian Reservation in Lakeside in San Diego County, California. It is owned and operated by the Barona Group of Capitan Grande Band of Mission Indians.

== Casino ==
Barona offers guests over 75 table games including blackjack, 3 card poker, Pai gow poker, Mississippi Stud, California-style craps (using playing cards to determine the outcome of a roll rather than only dice, as dice-only games are not allowed in California tribal casinos), roulette and over 2,500 slot and video poker machines. Barona is located between Lakeside and Ramona, 30 miles northeast of downtown San Diego.

The minimum gambling age at Barona Casino is 18. While the legal age for gambling in California is also 18, many tribal casinos in California set an age limit of 21 in order to comply with their alcohol license.

Unlike most casinos, Barona does not offer alcoholic beverages on the casino floor. It does offer alcoholic beverages in the Barona Oaks Steakhouse, Italian Cucina, room service. According to the leaders of Barona Casino, the winding and hilly nature of Wildcat Canyon Road, which serves as the main access route into Barona Indian Reservation, is a primary factor that led to this decision.

As of 2024, Barona is San Diego’s only non-smoking casino. By law, tribal casinos are exempt from state and local laws that regulate smoking.
