= Barona Group of Capitan Grande Band of Mission Indians =

Native Kumeyaay Indians in Southern California

Total population
- 600 adults 300 kids

Regions with significant populations
- United States (California)

Languages
- Ipai, Tipai, English

Religion
- Traditional tribal religion, Christianity (Roman Catholicism)

Related ethnic groups
- other Kumeyaay tribes, Cocopa, Quechan, Paipai, and Kiliwa

Barona Reservation
- Reservation
- Interactive map of Barona Reservation
- Coordinates: 32°57′N 116°50′W
- Country: United States
- State: California
- Established: 1932

Population (1973)
  - Total: 125

The Barona Group of Capitan Grande Band of Mission Indians of the Barona Reservation is a federally recognized tribe of Kumeyaay Indians, who are sometimes known as Mission Indians.

== Reservations ==
Location of Barona Reservation

In 1875, the tribe, along with the Viejas Group of Capitan Grande Band of Mission Indians, controlled the Capitan Grande Reservation, which consisted of barren, uninhabitable mountain lands. The El Capitan Reservoir, forcibly purchased from the two tribes to provide water for San Diego, submerged what habitable land existed on the reservation. The two tribes jointly control this reservation. It is undeveloped but serves as an ecological preserve.

The Barona Reservation (32°57′19″N 116°50′39″W) is a federal Indian reservation located in San Diego County, California, near Lakeside and the Cleveland National Forest. It takes its name from the Mexican land grant Cañada de San Vicente y Mesa del Padre Barona, named in turn after Padre José Barona, a friar at Mission San Diego de Alcalá from 1798 until he transferred to Mission San Juan Capistrano in 1811. Founded in 1932, the reservation covers 5,181 acres (20.97 km^{2}). Much of the highland valley has good farmland. The reservation hosts several ranches, a chapel, tribal offices, a community center, and a ballpark created by the tribe. In 1973, 125 of the 156 enrolled members lived on the reservation. The nearest community is San Diego Country Estates, which adjoins the reservation's northeast side.

== Demographics ==
=== 2020 census ===
Barona Reservation and Off-Reservation Trust Land, California – Racial and ethnic composition Note: the US Census treats Hispanic/Latino as an ethnic category. This table excludes Latinos from the racial categories and assigns them to a separate category. Hispanics/Latinos may be of any race.
Race / Ethnicity (NH = Non-Hispanic)	Pop 2000	Pop 2010	Pop 2020	% 2000	% 2010	% 2020
White alone (NH)	80	68	80	14.93%	10.63%	10.58%
Black or African American alone (NH)	0	0	1	0.00%	0.00%	0.13%
Native American or Alaska Native alone (NH)	326	460	516	60.82%	71.88%	68.25%
Asian alone (NH)	3	1	4	0.56%	0.16%	0.53%
Native Hawaiian or Pacific Islander alone (NH)	0	6	0	0.00%	0.94%	0.00%
Other race alone (NH)	0	1	0	0.00%	0.16%	0.00%
Mixed race or Multiracial (NH)	29	4	41	5.41%	0.63%	5.42%
Hispanic or Latino (any race)	98	100	114	18.28%	15.63%	15.08%
Total	536	640	756	100.00%	100.00%	100.00%

== Government ==
The Barona Band of Mission Indians is headquartered in Lakeside, California. They are governed by a democratically elected, seven-person tribal council, who serve four-year terms. The Tribe, also joined by Traditional Headsman As of May 2024, the council members are:

- Raymond Welch, Chairman
- Mary Beth Glasco, Vice-Chairwoman
- Delia Castillo, Councilwoman
- Joseph Banegas, Councilman
- Tawyna Phoenix, Councilwoman
- Manuel Navarro, Councilman
- Joseph Yeats, Councilman

Traditional Tribal Singer’s

- Daniel Murphy, Bird Singer
- Donovan Nation, Bird Singer

== Economic development ==
The tribe owns and operates Barona Resort & Casino, Barona Creek Golf Club, Barona Steakhouse, Sage Café, HoWan Noodle Shop, and several other restaurants, all in Lakeside. The tribe is developing an energy project for 2026, partially funded by the California Energy Commission.

== Bibliography ==
- Eargle, Dolan H. Jr. (2000). Northern California Guide: Weaving the Past and Present. San Francisco: Tree Company Press. ISBN 0-937401-10-2.
- Fetzer, Leland (2005). San Diego County Place Names A to Z. San Diego, California: Sunbelt Publications. ISBN 978-0-932653-73-4.
- Pritzker, Barry M. (2000). A Native American Encyclopedia: History, Culture, and Peoples. Oxford: Oxford University Press. ISBN 978-0-19-513877-1.
- Shipek, Florence C. (1978). "History of Southern California Mission Indians". In Heizer, Robert F. (ed.). Handbook of North American Indians. Vol. 8: California. Washington, DC: Smithsonian Institution. pp. 610–618. ISBN 0-87474-187-4.
