= Lake Poway =

Dam in Poway, California, US

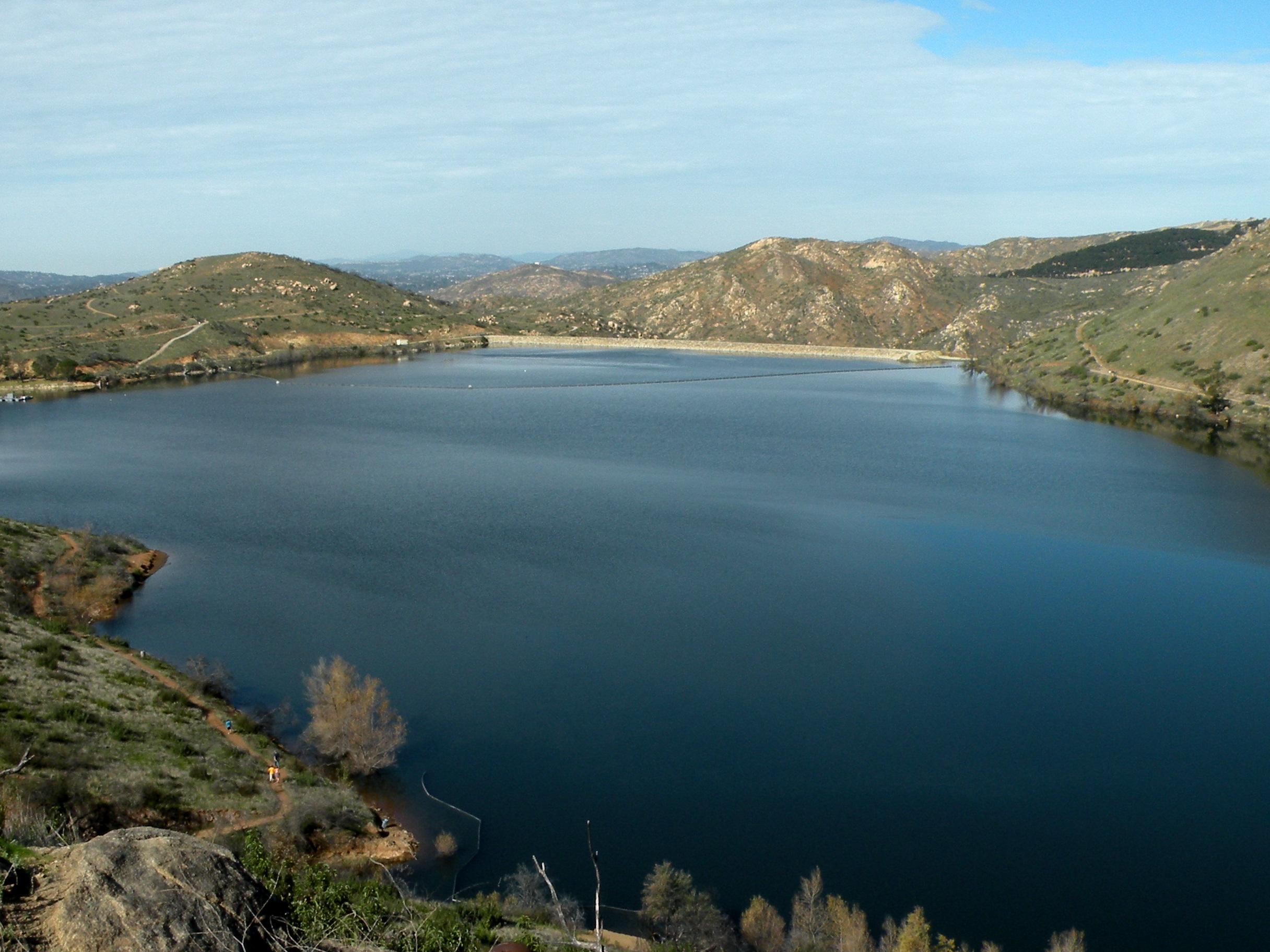
- Lake Poway in 2009

- Location within California Location within the United States
- Location: Poway, California, US
- Coordinates: 33°00′25″N 117°00′36″W
- Status: In use
- Construction began: 1970
- Opening date: 1972
- Owner: City of Poway

Dam and spillways
- Type of dam: Earthen dam
- Height: 165 ft (50 m)
- Dam volume: 1,300,000 m^{3} (46,000,000 ft^{3})

Reservoir
- Total capacity: 3,800 acre⋅ft (4,700,000 m^{3})
- Surface area: 35 acres (14 ha)
- Website poway.org/401/Lake-Poway

Lake Poway is a dam and reservoir in Poway, California, United States. The dam is owned by the City of Poway and was constructed between 1970 and 1972 with the purpose of storing and supplying water, and providing recreational facilities to the community. A $3.2-million bond issue for construction of the dam was rejected by voters in 1964 and 1966, but passed with 87 percent in favor in 1969. Year-round fishing for trout, bass, catfish, sunfish and bluegill is available at the lake.

== History ==
In 1962, a report showed that Poway's existing storage facilities were insufficient in the event of a breakdown of the aqueduct from the Colorado River following an earthquake or other interruption to the supply. As a result, it was proposed that an earthen dam be built in Warren Canyon to impound water and form a storage reservoir. Funds for the project were to come from a bond issue and the matter came to a vote in March 1964. In this first vote and a second attempt in June 1966, the measure received the support of most voters, but failed to reach the required two-thirds majority. Finally, in June 1969, a $3.2-million bond was passed with 87 percent in favor. Groundbreaking took place in December 1970, with water flowing into the dam in late 1971. Recreational facilities were built in 1972, and opened in October of that year.

In 2017, torrential rains caused the reservoir water level to near the top of the dam, but a spillover did not occur and it remained structurally sound.

In 2019, Poway experienced a water quality event. A precautionary boil water advisory was issued and the San Diego County Department of Health forced restaurants and other businesses to shut down for a week. The problem started when a storm water pipe backed up during strong rains on the November 28 and 29. Due to a valve failure, the pipe leaked storm water into the clearwell reservoir near Lake Poway, and next to the water treatment plant, clouding the water sent to homes with mud and residue. After the problem was fixed, the 2019 annual water quality report showed that the drinking water was safe. Following this incident a major overhaul of the water system is scheduled to start in 2021, taking five years to be completed and with an estimated cost of $70 million. The project involves replacing the clear well and adding a secondary back up tank to ensure continuous operation. A million dollars in federal funding was secured for the project, to be used in bypassing the existing clear well.

== Dam and reservoir ==
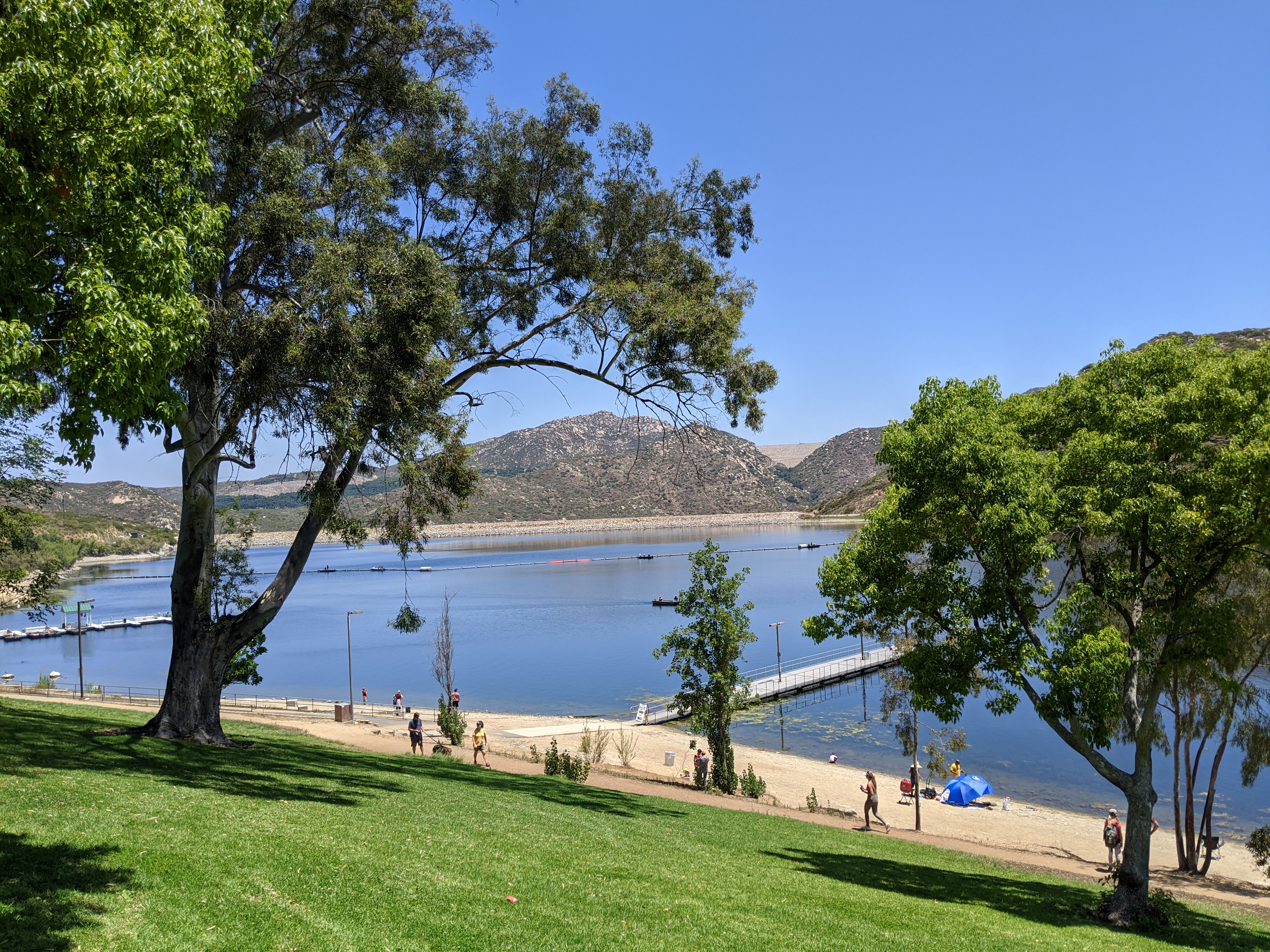
Lake Poway in June 2020

The dam is an earth-filled dam with a height of 165 ft (50 m). The reservoir has a surface area of 35 acres (14 ha), and a capacity of 3,800 acre⋅ft (4,700,000 m^{3}). The spillway is a span of concrete 100 ft (30 m) wide, located on the east side of the dam.

Water is supplied by the San Diego County Water Authority to be processed through the Lester J. Berglund water treatment plant and then stored in a clearwell.

== Recreational usage ==
The adjacent hillside park has several picnic areas, playgrounds and sports facilities. Since 1997, the "Game at the Lake" annual softball game between Poway High School and Rancho Bernardo High School has taken place on the final day of the regular season.

On May 9, 2017, a memorial statue was unveiled at Lake Poway in honor of long-time Poway resident and San Diego Padres baseball player Tony Gwynn. The bronze likeness of Gwynn was designed by Seth Vandable.

=== Hiking ===
The lake has a 2.75-mile loop trail that circles the reservoir and links to other trails such as the Blue Sky Ecological Reserve trail to Lake Ramona, and the more difficult route to the top of Mount Woodson, and the Potato Chip rock.

The trail passes through four distinct environments: sage scrub, chaparral, oak woodland and riparian woodland. A variety of native plants such as Arroyo Lupine (Lupinus succulentus) and Wild Canterbury bells (Phacelia minor) can be found near the lake.

=== Fishing ===
Year-round fishing is available for trout, bass, catfish, sunfish and bluegill. The lake is stocked with rainbow trout in the winter months, and offers good fishing for bass, catfish, and bluegill in warmer months. The lake has hosted an annual youth fishing derby for more than 25 years.

The following are the lake catch records:

- Bass: 9 pounds, 5 ounces (2020)
- Blue Catfish: 47 pounds (2017)
- Channel Catfish: 28 pounds (1981)
- Sunfish: 2 pounds, 4 ounces (2006)
- Bluegill: 2 pounds, 8 ounces (2002)

== Gallery ==
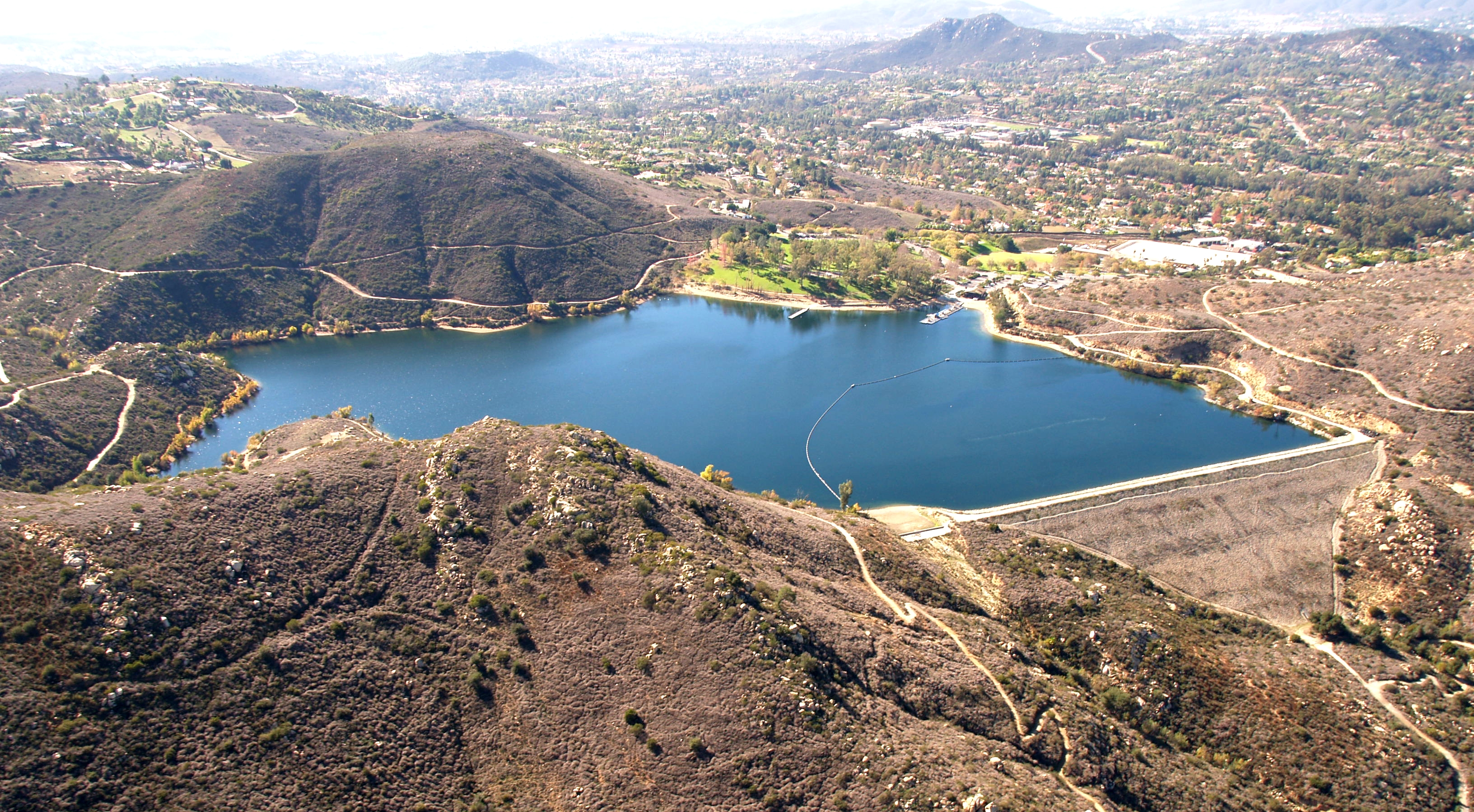

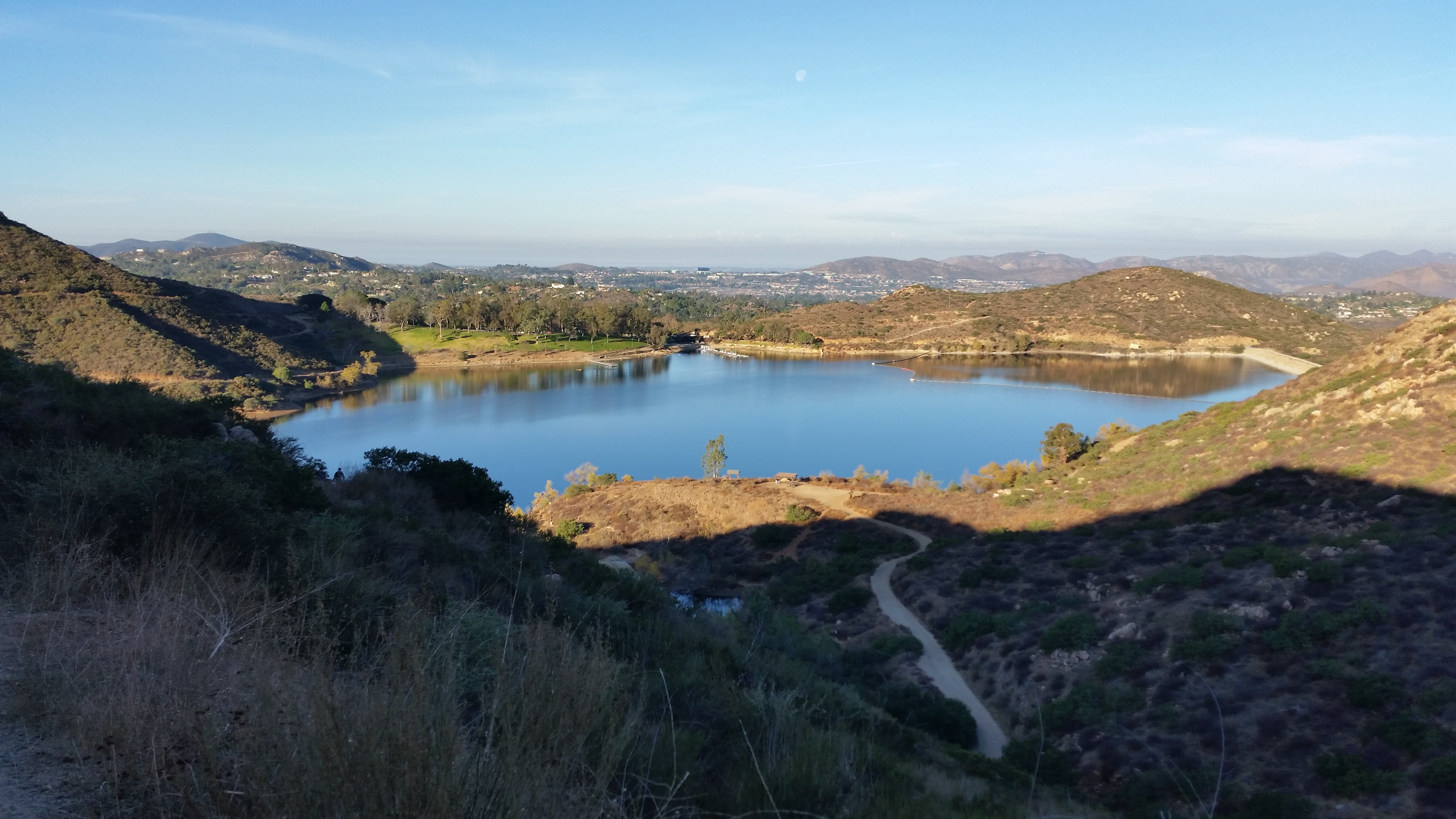

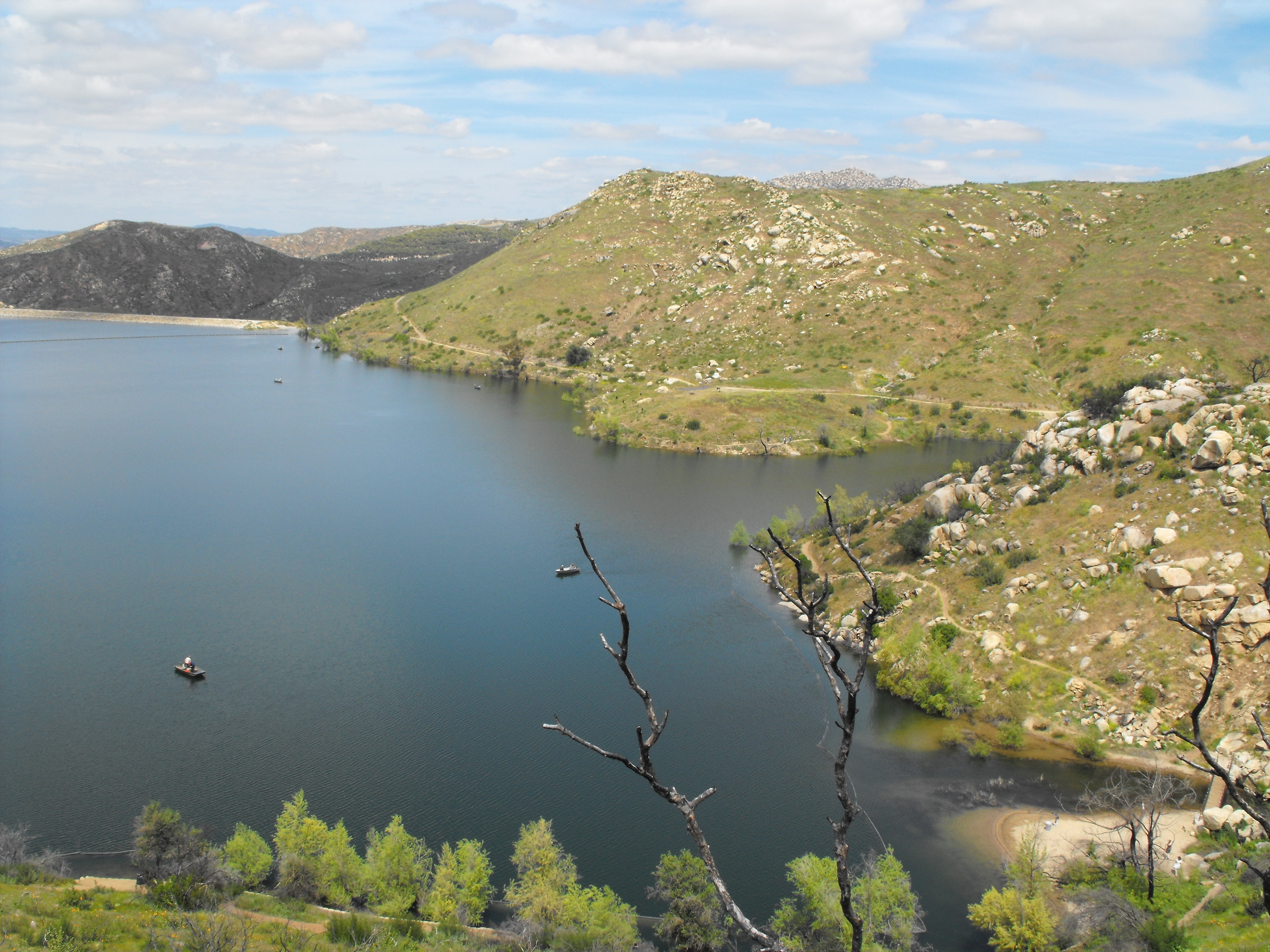

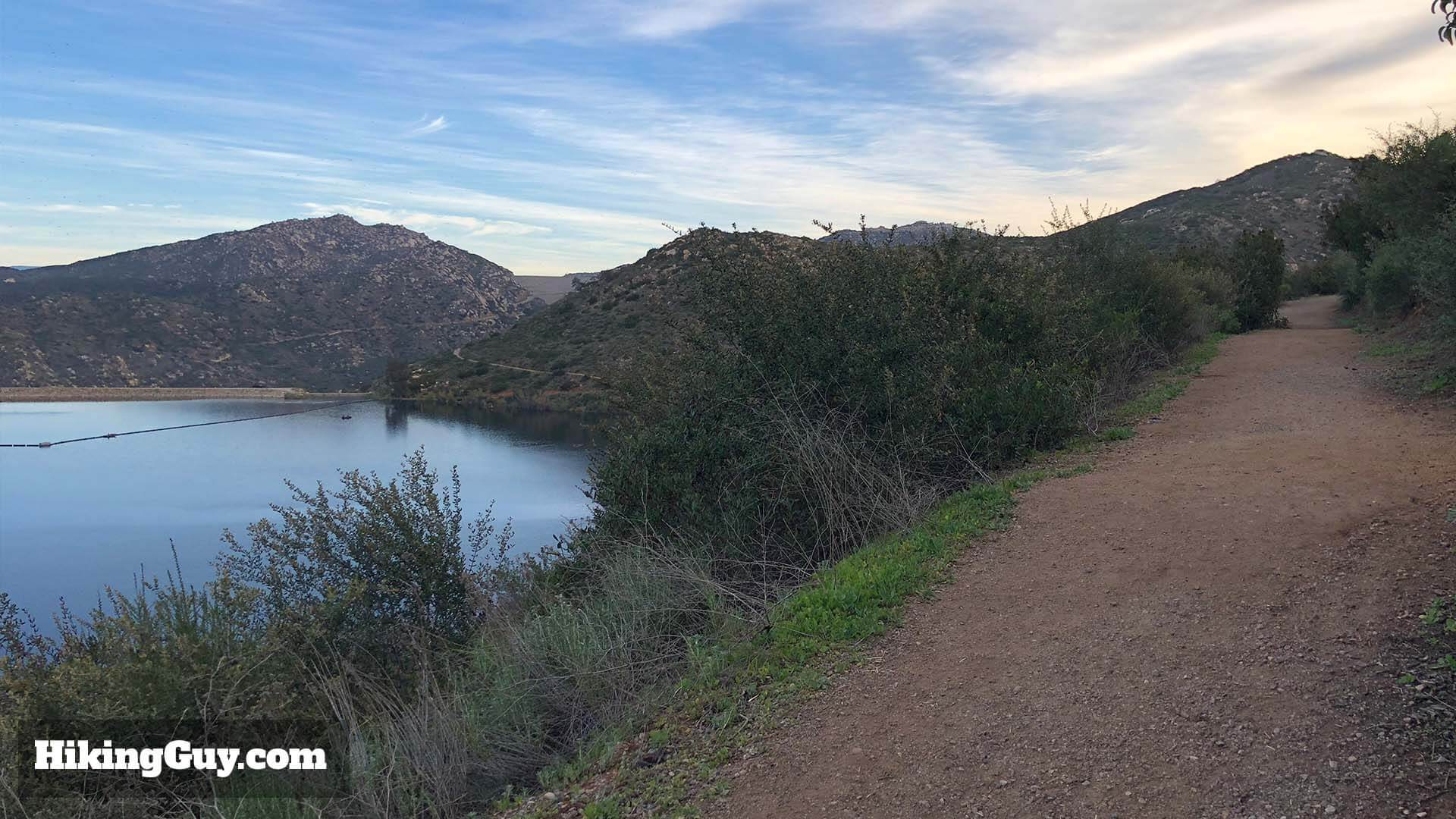

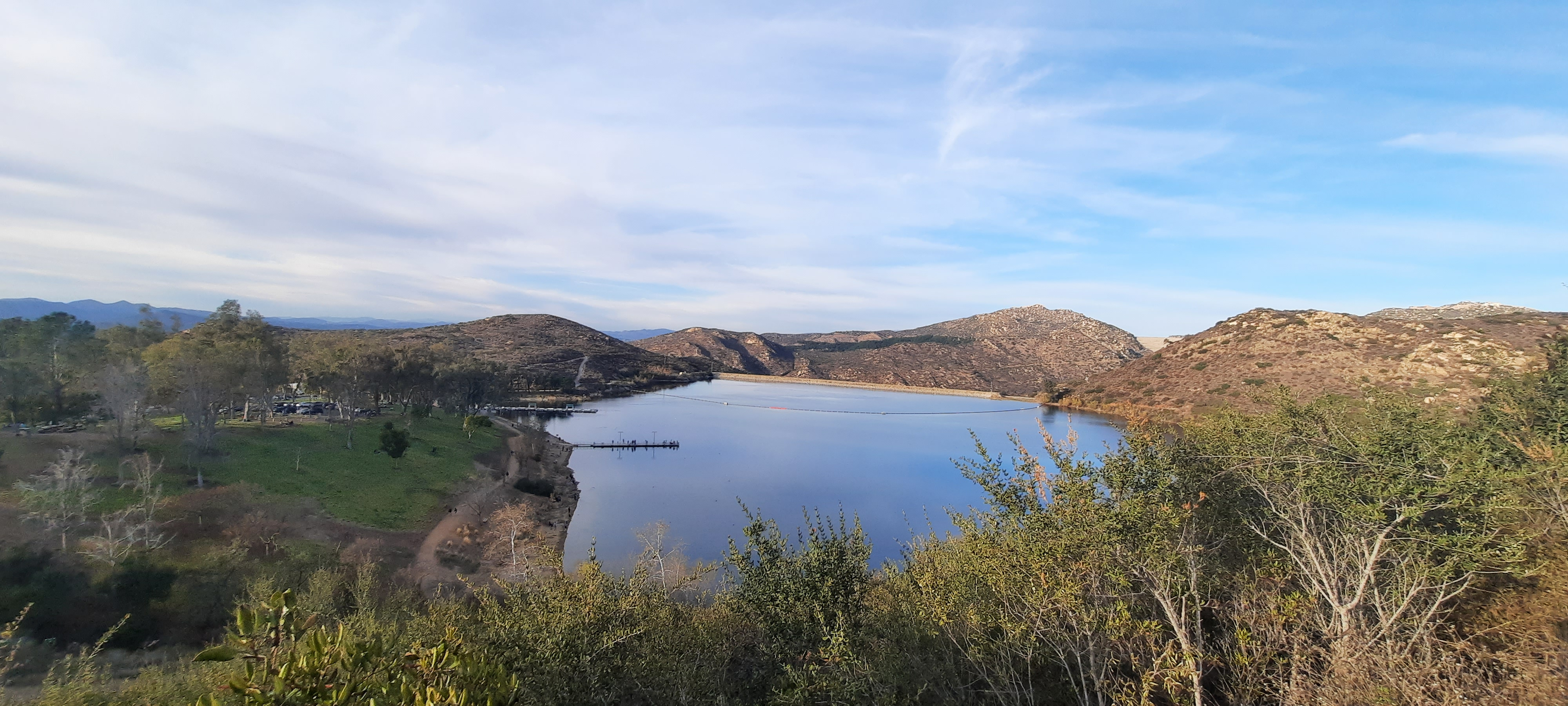

== See also ==
- List of lakes in California
