= California State Route 67 =

Highway in California

State Route 67
- State Route 67 highlighted in red

Route information
- Maintained by Caltrans
- Length: 24.38 mi (39.24 km)
- Existed: 1933–present

Major junctions
- South end: I-8 in El Cajon
- SR 52 in Santee
- North end: SR 78 in Ramona

Location
- Country: United States
- State: California
- Counties: San Diego

Highway system
- State highways in California; Interstate; US; State; Scenic; History; Pre‑1964; Unconstructed; Deleted; Freeways
| ← SR 66 | → SR 68 |

State Route 67 (SR 67) is a state highway in San Diego County, California, United States. It begins at Interstate 8 (I-8) in El Cajon and continues to Lakeside as the San Vicente Freeway before becoming an undivided highway through the eastern part of Poway. In the town of Ramona, the route turns into Main Street before ending at SR 78. SR 67 provides direct access from the city of San Diego to the East County region of San Diego County, including Ramona and Julian.

The route has existed as a railroad corridor since the turn of the 20th century. A highway known as the Julian road was built by 1913, and was designated as Legislative Route 198 in the state highway system by 1935. Route 198 was renumbered SR 67 in the 1964 state highway renumbering. A freeway south of Lakeside was built in the late 1960s, and opened to traffic in 1970. Since then, the portion of the highway north of Lakeside has become known for a high number of traffic accidents and related fatalities. The California Department of Transportation (Caltrans) has made several attempts to remedy the problem and make the road safer.

== Route description ==
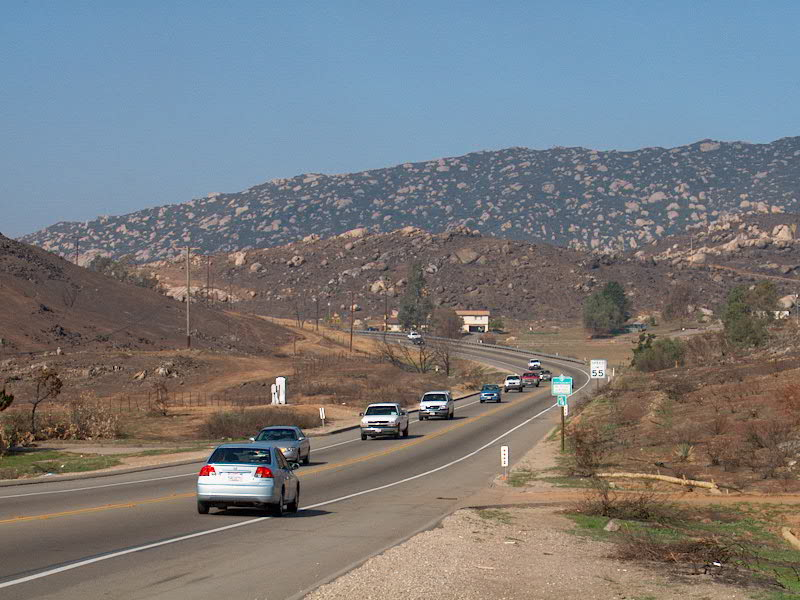
SR 67 north of Poway Road

Route 67 is defined in section 367 of the California Streets and Highways Code, and that the highway is "from Route 8 near El Cajon to Route 78 near Ramona".

SR 67 begins as the San Vicente Freeway at I-8 near the Parkway Plaza shopping mall in El Cajon . There are two subsequent interchanges in El Cajon: one with Broadway and Fletcher Parkway, and another with Bradley Avenue. Following this, the freeway continues north to Santee near Gillespie Field, before coming to an interchange with the eastern end of SR 52. Near the Woodside Avenue exit, SR 67 turns northeast, paralleling the San Diego River and entering the unincorporated area of Eucalyptus Hills as it leaves the San Diego urban area. Riverford Road and Winter Gardens Boulevard have interchanges with SR 67.

The freeway ends, and SR 67 turns north and becomes an undivided highway at Mapleview Street, crossing the San Diego River. SR 67 then enters rural areas to the west of San Vicente Reservoir. The road intersects the eastern end of Scripps Poway Parkway and County Route S4 (CR S4), the latter within the Poway city limits. In eastern Poway, SR 67 veers east, eventually leaving the city and entering unincorporated Rock Haven. The road continues near Rosemont before turning northeast and becoming Julian Road and then Main Street in downtown Ramona. SR 67 ends at the intersection with SR 78; SR 78 intersects to the northwest as Pine Street and continues northeast along Main Street towards Julian.

SR 67 is part of the California Freeway and Expressway System, and the freeway portion is part of the National Highway System, a network of highways that are considered essential to the country's economy, defense, and mobility by the Federal Highway Administration. The route is named the CHP Officer Christopher D. Lydon Memorial Freeway from I-8 to Mapleview Street in Lakeside. In 2013, SR 67 had an annual average daily traffic (AADT) of 94,000 between Broadway and Bradley Avenue (the highest AADT for the highway), and 18,100 between Rio Maria Road and Poway Road (the lowest AADT for the highway).

== History ==
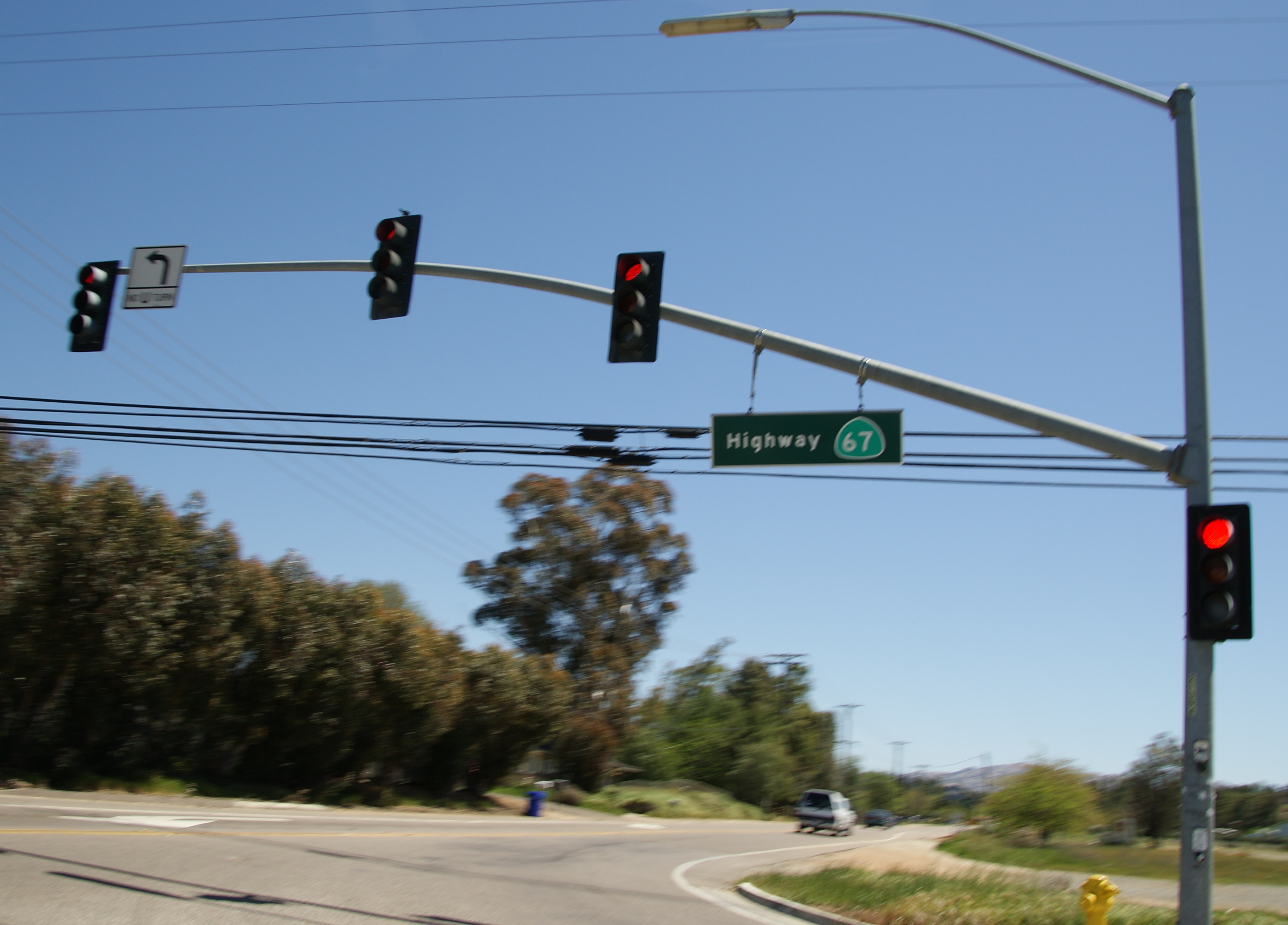
SR 67 near Ramona

=== Early days ===
The "Julian road" had been constructed by 1872, and was used for stagecoaches. In 1883, The San Diego Union and Daily Bee described it as a "disgrace to the county. It could hardly be in a worse condition... and should be repaired immediately." On October 21, 1885, the county Board of Supervisors agreed to a realignment of the Julian road, in what was known as the Bernardo District, onto private property. The road was described in 1890 by The San Diego Union and Daily Bee as passing through farms, and the grade was "cut on the west side of the canyon and buttressed with granite the greater part of the way." The route continued towards Ramona through vineyards, passing by more boulders.

Between 1885 and 1891, the San Diego, Cuyamaca, and Eastern Railroad was extended from San Diego through El Cajon to the town of Foster, northeast of Lakeside. In 1896, the stagecoach line connected the terminus of the railroad line in Foster to Julian, and transported the San Diego newspapers to Ramona by 2:30 pm each day. The county began to survey a new routing of the Julian road in 1913 cutting through the El Monte Ranch, reducing the distance from San Diego to Julian by five miles (8.0 km) and removing some steep grades.

Bidding was conducted on the Julian road, then known as Road No. 3A, on June 30, 1920; however, progress on the grading of the road fell behind the county engineer's expectations by October, with only 3.5 miles (5.6 km) of the road complete. The road was paved from Santee to El Cajon by the end of 1920. Between Foster and Julian, the paved road was opened in July 1922, at a cost of $550,000 (about $8,080,000 in 2024 dollars). The "Ramona Road" remained unpaved between the Mussey Grade and the road to Ballena, a distance of 20 miles (32 km), and the estimated cost of paving it was $400,000 (about $5,700,000 in 2024 dollars). In 1925, there were 12 miles (19 km) left of unpaved road between Ramona and Julian, and state and county taxes were to be used to fund this project. The Mussey Grade was completed in April 1925, marking the completion of the paved road between San Diego and Ramona.

San Diego County declared the Julian road a county boulevard in 1926, meaning that vehicles were required to stop before entering the highway. The road that would become SR 67 was added to the state highway system in 1933, from El Cajon to near Santa Ysabel, and was designated as Route 198 in 1935. It consisted of Maine and Woodside avenues in Lakeside and Magnolia Avenue in the city of El Cajon all the way to U.S. Route 80 (US 80) at Main Street. Because of the construction of San Vicente Reservoir north of Lakeside, a two-mile (3.2 km) section of the road had to be submerged, and it was decided to relocate the road 2 miles (3.2 km) further west by the foot of Mount Woodson. The road was allocated $830,784 in funding (about $12,575,003 in 2024 dollars) to be realigned, widened, and repaved between Lakeside and Mount Woodson in 1942. Grading and paving of the 11.7-mile (18.8 km) part was scheduled for completion on December 15, 1943.

Funding was allocated for traffic signals on the portion between Main Street and Broadway in El Cajon in 1954. Route 198 also extended onto La Mesa Boulevard and Palm Avenue to SR 94. This portion was signed as Sign Route 67 by 1962, from Campo Road to US 80. In the 1964 state highway renumbering, Route 198 was renumbered as State Route 67; the portion south of I-8 was renumbered as SR 125.

=== Freeway construction ===
The State Highway Commission decided to reroute SR 67 through Lakeside in 1954, moving it closer to the San Diego River and away from the city center, using the land formerly occupied by the old railroad. In 1961, the construction of the San Vicente Freeway was listed as a high-priority project by the California Chamber of Commerce. During 1964, the county of San Diego received $1 million (about $8 million in 2024 dollars) to construct SR 67 as a freeway from Pepper Drive to Broadway in the city of El Cajon. Another $1 million (about $8 million in 2024 dollars) was allocated in 1965, and the project was extended to I-8. The freeway from I-8 to Pepper Drive was complete by 1967, when Caltrans announced that "yellow, non-reflectorized markers interspersed with raised yellow dots" would be installed on the freeway portion to delineate the shoulder; this was the first section to use them in the county. By December 1968, the freeway was complete from I-8 north to Woodside Avenue; the grade at the northern end was smoothed out during the widening of the road in early 1970. In March, the freeway was under construction from Woodside Avenue to the San Diego River, at a cost of $3.2 million (about $19.9 million in 2024 dollars). The freeway portion opened on October 12, 1970; it was constructed four lanes wide.

It was planned that SR 67 would be the eastern terminus of SR 56. On December 30, 1980, the City of Poway included SR 56 in the city plan extending east through the city to a northern extension of SR 125. In 1983, both the cities of San Diego and Poway supported the extension of SR 56 to SR 67, although the City of Poway wanted the route moved and had reservations about the freeway ending in the city. There are no plans to construct the portion of SR 56 east of I-15. Several arterial roads connect the eastern end of the SR 56 freeway with SR 67, including Ted Williams Parkway, Twin Peaks Road, Espola Road (CR S5), and Poway Road (CR S4).

=== Safety concerns ===
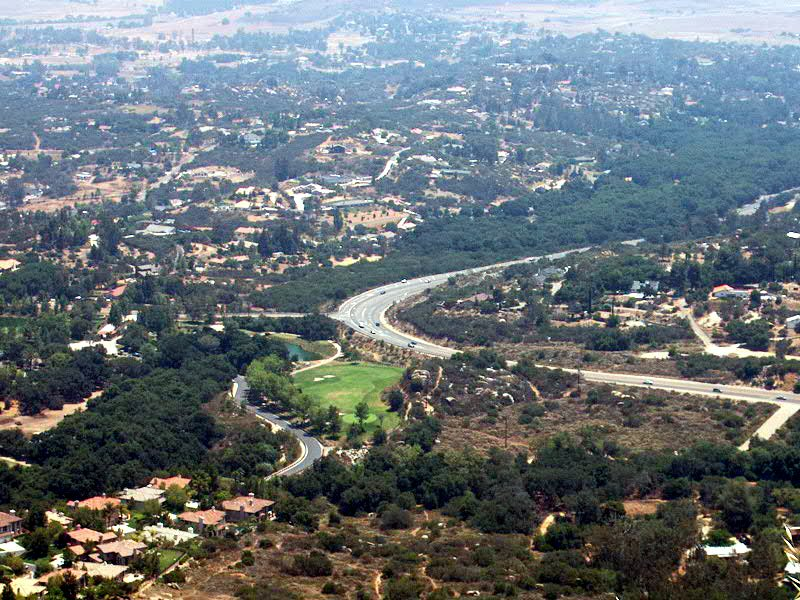
SR 67 south of Ramona

The highway portion of SR 67 was commonly known as "Slaughterhouse Alley" because of the high number of fatal accidents. The road was widened in 1979 to add a shoulder and passing lane between the north end of the freeway and Poway Road. During the construction, there were concerns about speeding cars putting the construction workers in danger. The total cost was $927,000 (about $3,222,000 in 2024 dollars), and Asphalt Inc. performed the work.

The reputation of the highway continued into the early years of the 21st century. In 2000, a $1 million project (about $1.7 million in 2024 dollars) was authorized to widen the shoulders of the road, after there were 413 accidents and 15 fatalities on SR 67 from 1996 to 1999. At this time, County Supervisor Dianne Jacob proposed expanding the highway portion to four lanes along the entire route. Following a safety initiative, including the involvement of law enforcement and trucking companies, accidents and fatalities both decreased by the end of 2001. Accidents continued, however, and by November 2008, electronic signs were installed to inform motorists of their speed, and another publicity campaign had been launched. The reduction from two lanes to one lane heading southbound just after a curve has been blamed for at least some of the accidents, with collisions resulting from cars "jockeying" to be ahead. Head-on collisions are another source of crashes. Despite this, in 2009 Caltrans did not view the road as unsafe according to official metrics.

In May 2009, the San Diego Association of Governments (SANDAG) announced that fixing SR 67 was number 17 on its priority list, resulting in an estimated 2030 completion of a four-lane highway that would not be limited-access. A month later, Caltrans and the California Highway Patrol agreed to take more efforts to educate the public about the safety issues. Signs were installed in 2010 to encourage drivers to practice safe driving habits; from January 2007 to early December 2010, twenty-four people died from accidents on SR 67. Following a March 2009 fatal crash, some of the survivors filed a lawsuit against Caltrans for negligence in maintaining and designing the highway, but the suit was decided in favor of the department. In a 2010 report, Caltrans suggested that two lanes could be added along the highway from I-8 to Dye Road in order to improve traffic flow.

=== Further developments ===
In 1983, the Kassler Corporation was awarded a contract to renovate the interchange with I-8 for $9.1 million (about $24 million in 2024 dollars). SR 67 from Poway Road to the Poway city limits was proposed to be widened in 1985. There was a movement in 1987 to construct a northbound offramp at Woodside Avenue, due to traffic congestion at the Prospect Avenue offramp; however, it was never built. Call boxes were installed on SR 67 in 1994.

There was also a proposal in 2000 to renovate the interchange at Bradley Avenue. The next year, SANDAG approved the construction of a southern bypass of Ramona and widening from Vigilante Road to Dye Road for a cost of $200 million as part of a 2030 transportation plan. The chairman of the Ramona Planning Group suggested calming traffic by using a roundabout instead of widening the highway.

The road's guardrails and signs sustained damage in the 2003 Cedar Fire. That year, there were plans to widen Route 67 from Mapleview Street to Dye Road; however, when threatened with a lawsuit from Save Our Forests and Ranchlands, SANDAG agreed to "reconsider" the project. Traffic jams were prevalent on October 21 and 22 in 2007, during the ongoing local wildfires and the evacuation of Ramona on the narrow road.

"Heavy construction" of SR 52 from SR 125 eastward to SR 67 began in February 2008, after it had been delayed by funding issues that were finally resolved in 2006 with voter-approved statewide transportation bonds. The interchange with SR 52 began construction in mid-June 2008. Completion was scheduled for 2010, but was delayed to early 2011 due to weather-related delays. This new interchange opened to traffic on March 29, 2011. The cost of this project was $525 million, funded with state and federal funds as well as TransNet county sales tax revenue.

== Major intersections ==
Except where prefixed with a letter, postmiles were measured on the road as it was in 1964, based on the alignment that existed at the time, and do not necessarily reflect current mileage. Postmile prefixes include: R reflecting a realignment in the route since then, M indicating a second realignment, L referring to an overlap due to a correction or change, and T indicating postmiles classified as temporary. Segments that remain unconstructed or have been relinquished to local control may be omitted. The entire route is in San Diego County.

| Location | Postmile | Exit | Destinations | Notes |
|---|---|---|---|---|
| El Cajon | R0.00 | | Magnolia Avenue – El Cajon | Continuation beyond I-8 |
| El Cajon | R0.00 | 1 | I-8 – San Diego, El Centro | Signed as exits 1A (west) and 1B (east); no exit number northbound; south end of SR 67; I-8 exit 17 westbound, 17B eastbound |
| El Cajon | R0.31 | 1C | Broadway / Fletcher Parkway | No exit number northbound |
| Bostonia | R1.12 | 1D | Bradley Avenue | Signed as exit 1 northbound |
| Santee | R1.94 | 2 | SR 52 west / Prospect Avenue | Prospect Avenue is northbound exit only; east end of SR 52; SR 52 exits 18B-C |
| Santee | R2.67 | 3 | Woodside Avenue – Santee | Southbound exit and northbound entrance |
| Lakeside | R3.91 | 4 | Riverford Road | |
| Lakeside | R4.83 | 5 | Winter Gardens Boulevard – Lakeside | Northbound exit and southbound entrance |
| Lakeside | | North end of freeway | | |
| Lakeside | R5.48 | | Mapleview Street – Lakeside Business District | |
| Lakeside | | | Vine Street | RIRO intersection; northbound exit and entrance |
| | 13.56 | | Scripps Poway Parkway / Rio Maria Road | |
| Poway | 15.20 | | CR S4 (Poway Road) – Poway, Escondido | |
| Ramona | 24.38 | | SR 78 (10th Street / Main Street) – Santa Ysabel, Julian, Escondido | North end of SR 67 |
1.000 mi = 1.609 km; 1.000 km = 0.621 mi: Incomplete access
