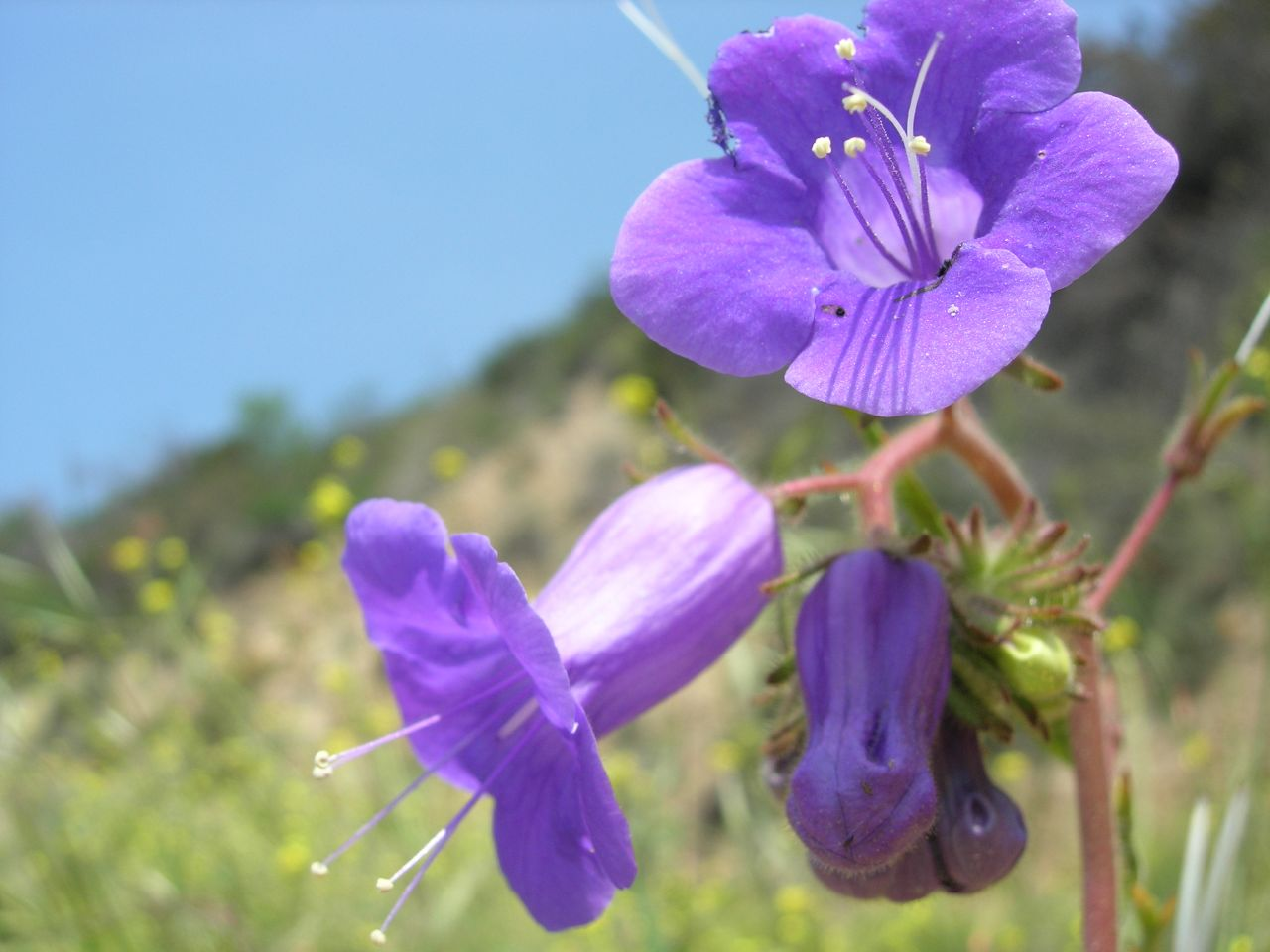

Scientific classification
- Kingdom: Plantae
- Clade: Tracheophytes
- Clade: Angiosperms
- Clade: Eudicots
- Clade: Asterids
- Order: Boraginales
- Family: Hydrophyllaceae
- Genus: Phacelia
- Species: P. minor

Binomial name
- Phacelia minor (Harv.) Thell.

Synonyms
- List: Phacelia minor var. whitlavia J.F.Macbr.; Phacelia whitlavia A.Gray; Phacelia whitlavia var. euwhitlavia Brand; Phacelia whitlavia f. genuina Brand; Phacelia whitlavia f. gracillima Brand; Phacelia whitlavia f. heterostyla Brand; Phacelia whitlavia var. jonesii Brand; Phacelia whitlavia f. minor (Harv.) Brand; Whitlavia gloxinioides J.Hill Dicks.; Whitlavia grandiflora Harv.; Whitlavia minor Harv.

= Phacelia minor =

Species of plant

Phacelia minor, with the common names Whitlavia and wild Canterbury bells, is a species of flowering plant in the family Hydrophyllaceae. It is native to Southern California and Baja California, where it grows in the Colorado Desert and the coastal and inland mountains of the Transverse-Peninsular Ranges, often in chaparral and areas recently burned.

== Description ==
Phacelia minor is an annual herb producing a mostly unbranched erect stem 20 to 60 centimeters tall. It is glandular and coated in stiff hairs. The leaves are up to 11 centimeters long with toothed, crinkly, oval or rounded blades borne on long petioles. The showy inflorescence is a one-sided curving or coiling cyme of many bell-shaped flowers, each up to 4 centimeters in length. The large flowers are lavender to deep blue-purple in color with protruding stamens tipped with white anthers.

There are reports that glandular hairs of stems, flowers and leaves of P. minor secrete oil droplets that can cause an unpleasant skin rash (contact dermatitis) in some people.

== See also ==
- California chaparral and woodlands ecoregion
- California coastal sage and chaparral ecoregion
- Colorado Desert
