= Woodson Mountain =

Mountain in California, United States

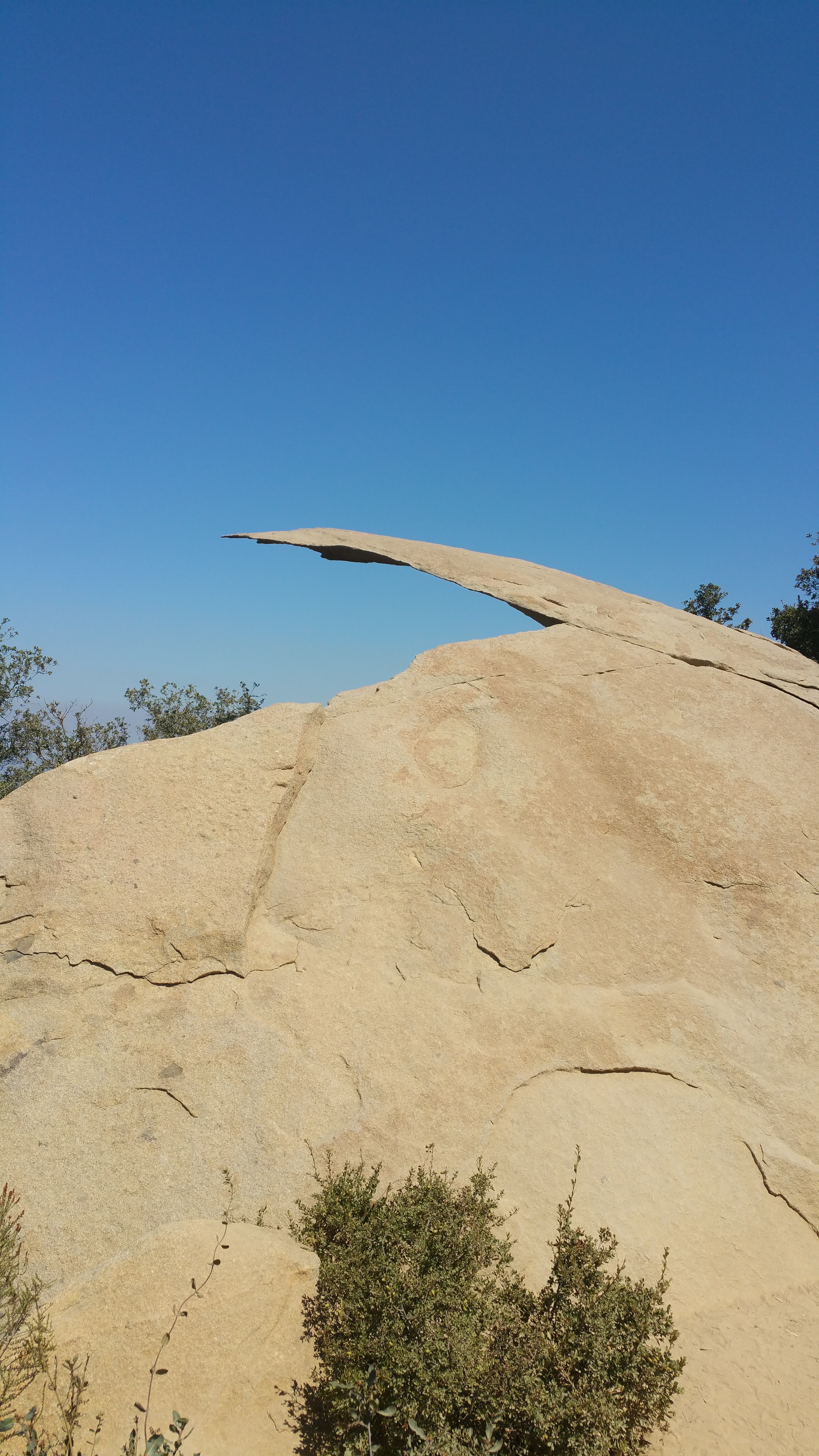

Highest point
- Elevation: 2,901 ft (884 m) NAVD 88
- Prominence: 1,454 ft (443 m)
- Listing: San Diego Peak list
- Coordinates: 33°00′31″N 116°58′14″W

Naming
- Native name: Ewiiy Hellyaa (Kumiai)

Geography
- Location within San Diego County, California Location within California
- Topo map: USGS San Pasqual

Climbing
- Easiest route: Trail hike

Woodson Mountain, also known as Mount Woodson, is a mountain near Poway, California. It is known for Potato Chip Rock, located the west of the summit.

== History ==
The Kumeyaay call this mountain Ewiiy Hellyaa, meaning the 'Mountain of the Moonlit Rocks', which was considered a place of power where the Moon sleeps. It is also associated with a mythical rabbit and the story of Toyapai, a Kumeyaay sprit giant who stepped on the southern side of the mountain on the way to the coast. Pioneers passing through the area called it Cobbleback Peak.

The mountain was renamed as Woodson Mountain in honor of Confederate dentist Dr. Marshall Clay Woodson, who moved into the area in 1895.

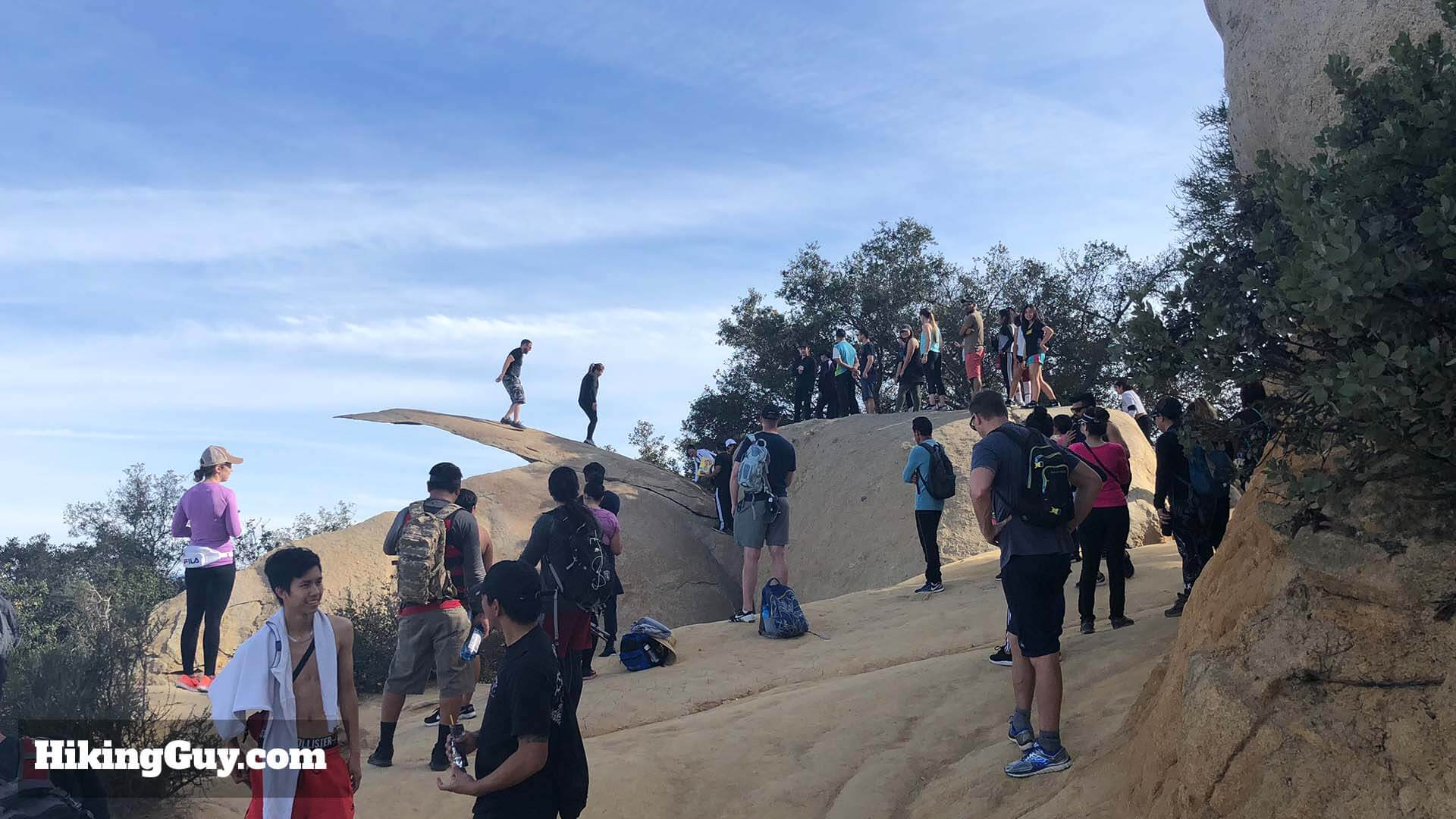
Crowd of hikers and tourists around Potato Chip Rock

The mountain became popular in the 2010s as Potato Chip Rock became more widely known through the influence of social media platforms such as Instagram.

== Potato Chip Rock ==
The rock is located at the top of the mountain, at an elevation of about 2,900 feet (884 m). The hike to the rock takes approximately three to four hours. Potato Chip Rock sits 100 yards below the summit. One popular way to reach the rock is through a 6.6-mile round trip hike from the Lake Poway trailhead to the west. There are two other popular routes to the top that start on the east side of Mount Woodson. A short route begins from free parking areas along Route 67 and takes Mt. Woodson Road up to the rock. This 3.75-mile round-trip hike is paved and steep. The Fry-Kogel trail is the third route to the rock, and is about four miles each way.

The rock is thin and more than seven feet long, and it looks as if it is about to fall.

The rock was used as an April Fools' Day prank by Poway mayor Steve Vaus in 2017. In a tweet, he wrote that part of the rock had snapped off and added a picture for "proof".

Also located on the trail from Lake Poway to Potato Chip Rock is Sandcrawler Rock, named for its resemblance to the Sandcrawler transport vehicle from the Star Wars universe.
