= Ramona Airport =

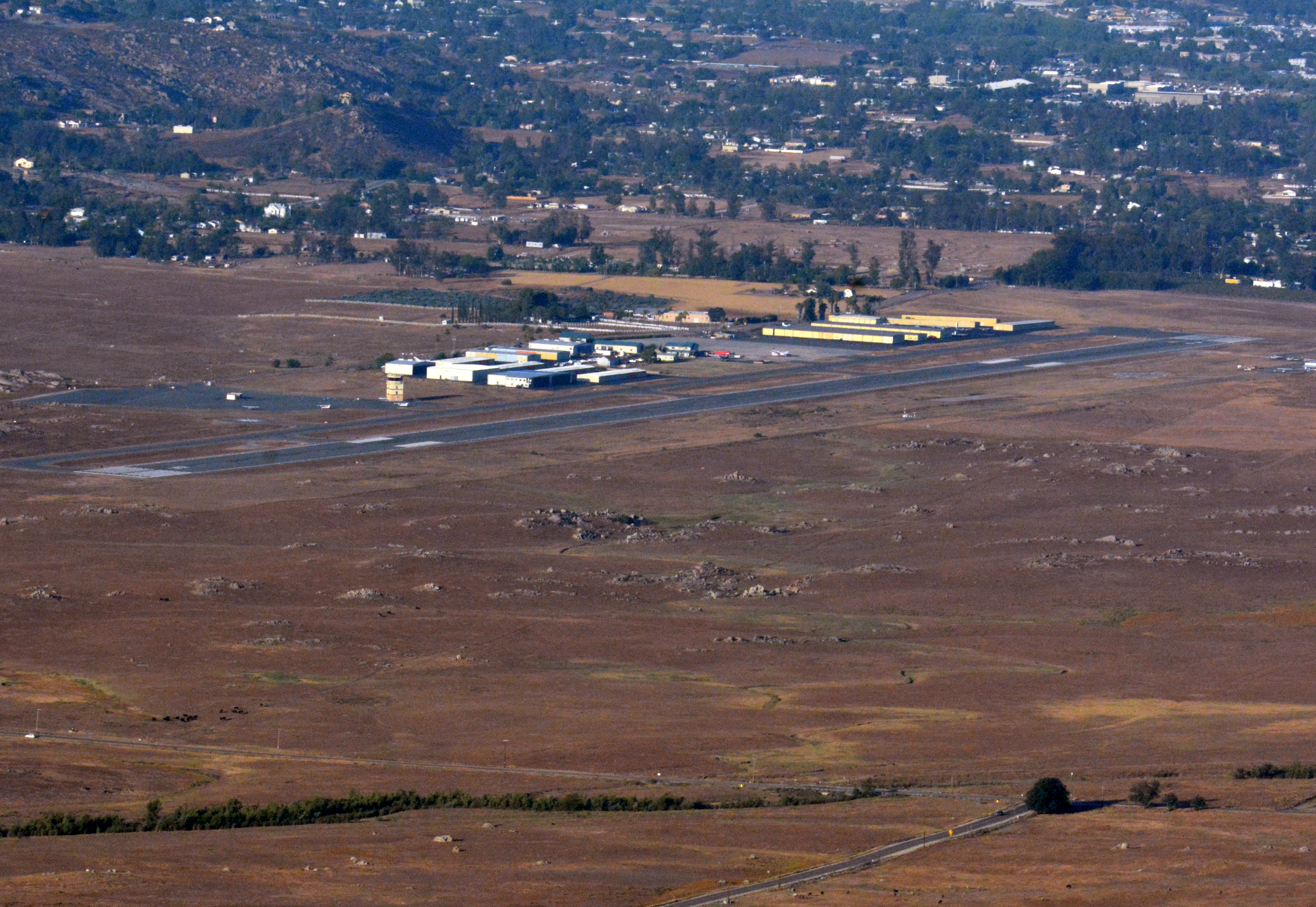
- IATA: none; ICAO: KRNM; FAA LID: RNM

Summary
- Airport type: Public
- Owner: County of San Diego
- Location: Ramona, San Diego County, California
- Elevation AMSL: 1,395 ft / 425 m
- Coordinates: 33°02′21″N 116°54′55″W

Map
- FAA airport diagram

Runways
Direction	Length		Surface
Direction	ft	m	Surface
9/27	5,001	1,524	Asphalt

Helipads
Number	Length		Surface
Number	ft	m	Surface
H1	340	104	Asphalt/concrete

Statistics (2020)
- Aircraft operations: 144,979
- Based aircraft: 135
- Source: Federal Aviation Administration

Ramona Airport (ICAO: KRNM, FAA LID: RNM, formerly L39) is a public airport two miles west of Ramona in San Diego County, California, United States. The airport is mostly used for general aviation.

The California Department of Forestry and Fire Protection (CAL FIRE) and the United States Forest Service (USFS) jointly operate a fire attack base. The airports hosts the Ramona Air Fair & Fly-In every year in October.

Most U.S. airports use the same three-letter location identifier for the FAA and IATA, but Ramona Airport is RNM to the FAA and has no IATA code.

== Facilities ==
Ramona Airport covers 342 acres (138 ha) and has one runway (9/27: 5,001 x 150 ft.) and one helipad (H1: 340 x 66 ft.).

In 2020 the airport had 144,979 aircraft operations, averaging 397 per day: 100% general aviation, and <1% military. 135 aircraft were then based at this airport: 119 single engine, 10 multi-engine, 1 jet, 3 helicopter, and 2 ultralight.

== Classic Rotors Museum ==
Classic Rotors Museum, a flying aviation museum specializing in helicopters and other rotorcraft, is based at Ramona Airport. The museum bills itself as "the rare and vintage rotorcraft museum" and claims to be one of "three dedicated rotorcraft museums in the world".

== Ramona Bombing Target and Emergency Landing Field ==
During World War II the airport was used by the US Navy as the 'Ramona Bombing Target and Emergency Landing Field. The site was 405 acres and opened on October 15, 1943. The site closed after the war and was turned over to San Diego County on February 26, 1947.

== Aerial firefighting operations ==
Ramona Airport is home to the Ramona Air Attack Base operated by CAL FIRE. The base was established in 1957 and is CAL FIRE's oldest air attack base. In 1960, USFS began operating a separate base from CAL FIRE. In 1966, the bases merged and became jointly operated. As of June 2026, four aircraft are stationed at Ramona Air Attack Base, two S-2 Trackers, one OV-10 Bronco, and a C-130H Hercules . In June 2026, a Helitack base was established at Ramona, which hosts a Sikorsky-70i Firehawk helicopter, as well as a CAL FIRE Helitack crew.

The base responds to an average of 450 calls per year and on average, the base outputs 850,000 U.S. gallons a year. Its direct protection area covers 1.4 million acres for CAL FIRE, 300,000 for USFS, and covers all of San Diego County.

In August 2025, CAL FIRE began a $12 million, 8 to 12-month upgrade project to support an incoming C-130H air tanker and increase operational efficiency. The upgrade includes replacing aging tarmac, constructing a new retardant loading station, reconfiguring current stations, and a new 4,192-square-foot barracks for fire crews during major fires to improve readiness and response times.
