= Rancho Cañada de San Vicente y Mesa del Padre Barona =

Mexican land grant in California

Coordinates: 32.980°N 116.860°W

Rancho Cañada de San Vicente y Mesa del Padre Barona was a 13,316-acre (53.89 km^{2}) Mexican land grant in present-day San Diego County, California, given in 1846 by Governor Pío Pico to Juan Bautista Lopez. The grant was located in the San Vicente and Padre Barona Valleys, which lie south of Ramona. The area served as grazing lands for Mission San Diego. Father José Barona served at Mission San Diego from 1798 to 1810, before moving to Mission San Juan Capistrano.

== History ==
The three-square-league Rancho Cañada de San Vicente y Mesa de Padre Barona was granted to Juan Bautista Lopez (b. 1786). Juan Bautisto Lopez was a military ally of Pico against Governor Manuel Victoria in 1831. In 1850, Lopez deeded the Rancho to his nephew, Domingo Yorba (b. 1826), son of José Antonio Yorba II. Domingo's mother, Maria Josefa Verdugo and Lopez’ wife, Maria Catalina Verdugo, were sisters. In return for the title to San Vicente rancho, Domingo agreed to provide for his elderly aunt and uncle.

With the cession of California to the United States following the Mexican-American War, the 1848 Treaty of Guadalupe Hidalgo provided that the land grants would be honored. As required by the Land Act of 1851, a claim for Rancho Cañada de San Vicente y Mesa del Padre Barona was filed with the Public Land Commission in 1852, and the grant was patented to Domingo Yorba in 1873.

In 1868, Domingo Yorba sold the rancho to Charles V. Howard. Howard immediately sold one-half interest in the property to Prudent Beaudry, John G. Downey, and G.A. Hayward. Less than a year later, these partners sold the rancho to a group of 19 individuals. Partitioning of the land began in 1870. Augustus Barnett came to California in 1870, originally settling in San Jose. After moving to San Diego, the Barnetts remained in the city for about two years before moving to the San Vicente area. Over a period of several years, Barnett purchased and traded several parcels to assemble the 1,300-acre (5.3 km^{2}) Barnett Ranch.

== See also ==
- San Vicente Creek (San Diego County)
- San Vicente Reservoir
- Barona Group of Capitan Grande Band of Mission Indians
