= Ramona, San Diego County, California =

Ramona
- Census-designated place
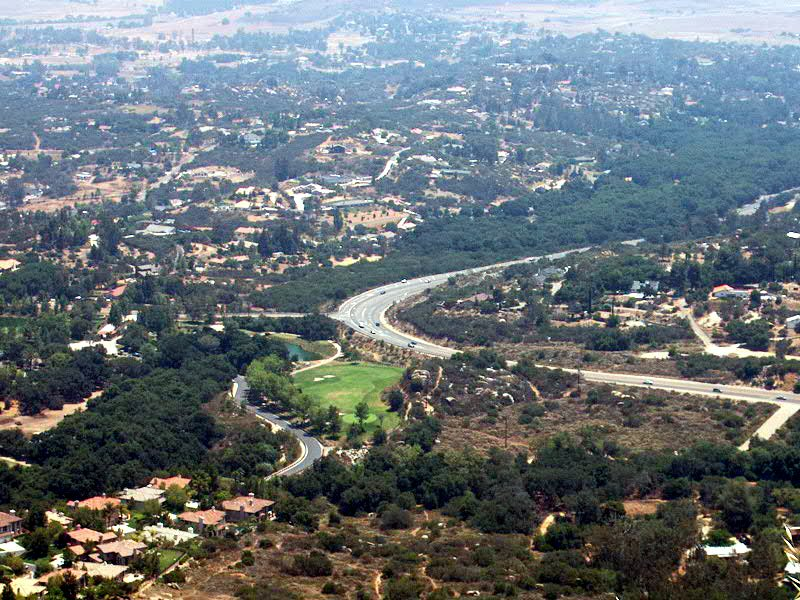
- Mt. Woodson community in Ramona
- Interactive map of Ramona
- Location in the United States
- Coordinates: 33°2′9″N 116°52′14″W
- Country: United States
- State: California
- County: San Diego

Area
  - Total: 38.455 sq mi (99.598 km^{2})
  - Land: 38.436 sq mi (99.549 km^{2})
  - Water: 0.019 sq mi (0.049 km^{2}) 0.05%
- Elevation: 1,430 ft (436 m)

Population (2020)
  - Total: 21,468
  - Density: 558.54/sq mi (215.65/km^{2})
- Time zone: UTC−8 (Pacific)
  - Summer (DST): UTC−7 (PDT)
- ZIP code: 92065
- Area codes: 442/760
- FIPS code: 06-59346
- GNIS feature ID: 1652781

Ramona is a census-designated place (CDP) in San Diego County, California, United States. The population was 21,468 at the 2020 census, up from 20,292 at the 2010 census.

The name Ramona also refers to an unincorporated community of San Diego (with some plans to incorporate) that includes both the Ramona CDP and the adjacent CDP of San Diego Country Estates. The population of the two CDPs, which does not include the fringe areas surrounding the CDPs, was 30,301 at the 2010 census, up from 25,223 at the 2000 census. The Ramona Community Planning Area had a population of 33,404 at the 2000 census. The January 1, 2006, population of the Ramona Community Planning Area is estimated to be 36,405 by the San Diego Association of Governments (SANDAG). USDA Hardiness Zones are 9b and 10a.

== History ==
=== Early times ===
Before it was permanently settled, the Ramona area was inhabited by the Kumeyaay Nation of Native Americans (Diegueño), a semi-nomadic people, who established annual settlements there as they moved between coastal and inland grounds. Their presence is indicated by archeological evidence such as rock paintings, etchings, and grinding stones used to grind acorns into meal for bread.

During Mexican governance of California, Rancho Valle de Pamo (also called Rancho Santa María) was a 17,709-acre (71.67 km^{2}) Mexican land grant that occupied the Santa Maria Valley and was centered on present-day Ramona.

The first post office was called Nuevo. The town took the name Ramona in 1886, when a land speculation syndicate, headed by Milton Santee, "organized the Santa Maria Land & Water Company and acquired 3,200 acres (13 km^{2}) for a townsite in the Santa Maria Valley and named it Ramona" after Helen Hunt Jackson's recent novel Ramona, which had stirred a nationwide interest in a romanticized vision of Southern California. The next year the town reverted to Nuevo because there was another town, in Los Angeles County, called Ramona. However, the other town did not flourish, and Nuevo permanently retook the name Ramona in 1894. Today in Ramona, there stands a Mexican restaurant named "Nuevo Grill" in remembrance of the town's original name. The restaurant even features a few old pictures that date back to when the town was still called Nuevo.

In 1886, Theophile Verlaque built a home, perhaps the first example of traditional French Provincial architecture in the Western United States, next to Amos' store. The Verlaque house, located at 645 Main Street in Ramona, is now home to the Ramona Pioneer Historical Society and its Guy B. Woodward Museum, and in 1991 was listed on the National Register of Historic Places.

The Ramona Town Hall was listed on the National Register of Historic Places in 1994. It has also been known as Town Hall of Nuevo, and Barnett Hall. The Hall was built on two lots donated by Milton Santee, who as noted above headed up the Santa Maria Land & Water Company syndicate. Augustus and Martha Barnett donated the $17,000 "to the towns people of Nuevo, on Washington's Birthday, February 22, 1894." Ramona Town Hall was designed by architect William S. Hebbard, who later, with his partner, Irving Gill, produced San Diego's best architecture until its breakup in 1907. The building is one of the largest, and oldest, adobe structures in southern California. Photographs of William Hebbard and Ramona Town Hall may be viewed on this San Diego Historical Society page, and on the Ramona Town Hall website.

As noted in a Ramona Home Journal article:

In the past, the Town Hall was home to Ramona’s first high school. Classes met upstairs from 1894 to 1898. The town’s first bank and first library also started in the building, and several religious groups met there before their churches were built.

Other organizations that met in the Town Hall included Ramona Grange, Santa Maria Masonic Lodge, Ramona Pioneer Historical Society, Ramona Chamber of Commerce, Ramona Art Guild, Town Hall Players and Ramona Council of Arts, Unlimited.

The Town Hall was used as a theater in the 1940s, with Harry Miles running the movie projector. It also was known as the community dance hall and the site of costume balls.

=== Recent history ===
In the 1960s, boxer Archie Moore held a training camp called "Salt Mine" which trained George Foreman and Muhammad Ali. Moore fought from 1936 until 1963 and battled the top names in boxing at the time, including Rocky Marciano, Floyd Patterson and Muhammad Ali. He won 185 of his 219 bouts before retiring at 49 years old after losing to Ali. Moore's connection to San Diego was his retreat, the Salt Mine Training Camp in Ramona. He called it "Salt Mine" because he said he worked as hard there to get ready for fights as anyone did in a salt mine. The property, at the foot of Mt. Woodson, included 120 acres (49 ha) with five homes, a boxing ring, a sweatbox (steam room) and miles of winding country roads and trails that Moore used for road work. Moore often encountered rattlesnakes and even mountain lions on his runs.

On Mother's Day, May 13, 1973, Ramona entered the national spotlight. 55-year-old former-tennis-great-turned-hustler, Bobby Riggs, challenged the then 30-year-old women's world number-one player, Margaret Court, to a match. The match was staged at Ramona's San Diego Country Estates. Riggs won easily, 6–2, 6–1. He later lost to Billie Jean King in The Battle of the Sexes at the Astrodome in Houston, Texas, on September 20, 1973.

The Cedar Fire began in Ramona approximately 3 miles (5 km) east of the San Diego Country Estates area, on October 25, 2003. The fire would eventually consume approximately 280,000 acres (1,133 km^{2}), burn 2,820 buildings (including 2,232 homes), and take 15 lives. The Cedar Fire was the largest fire in California history at the time. In her book, A Canyon Trilogy, author Chi Varnado, a longtime Ramona resident, described many of the hardships the victims faced in the aftermath of the fire.

The Witch Fire began near Ramona near the area called Witch Creek on October 21, 2007. By three days later it had burned approximately 195,000 acres (789 km^{2}) in San Diego County with over 640 homes destroyed, 250 damaged, and 12 firefighters injured according to the San Diego Union Tribune. Roads into the town were closed. On October 24 the Witch Fire merged with another fire called the Poomacha which had originated in the area of the La Jolla Indian Reservation. Along with more than 10 other fires burning in San Diego County at the same time, the Witch-Poomacha fire helped cause the largest mandatory evacuations in U.S. history, with over 500,000 people displaced as of October 24.

In January 2006, Ramona Valley was designated the country's 162nd American Viticultural Area (AVA) by the Alcohol and Tobacco Tax and Trade Bureau, which recognized the area for its distinctive microclimate, elevation, and soil attributes.

In May 2009, a grade 6 student at Mt. Woodson Elementary, Natalie Jones, was forbidden from delivering a class presentation on assassinated gay San Francisco city councilor Harvey Milk because her principal, and later the school district, declared it a "sensitive" issue that not all parents might want their children to learn about. The American Civil Liberties Union labeled the school district's actions as censorship and stepped in to give the school district five days to reverse its decision, and promise never to do anything like it again, or they would launch a lawsuit on Natalie's behalf. The school district did not immediately respond.

== Government ==
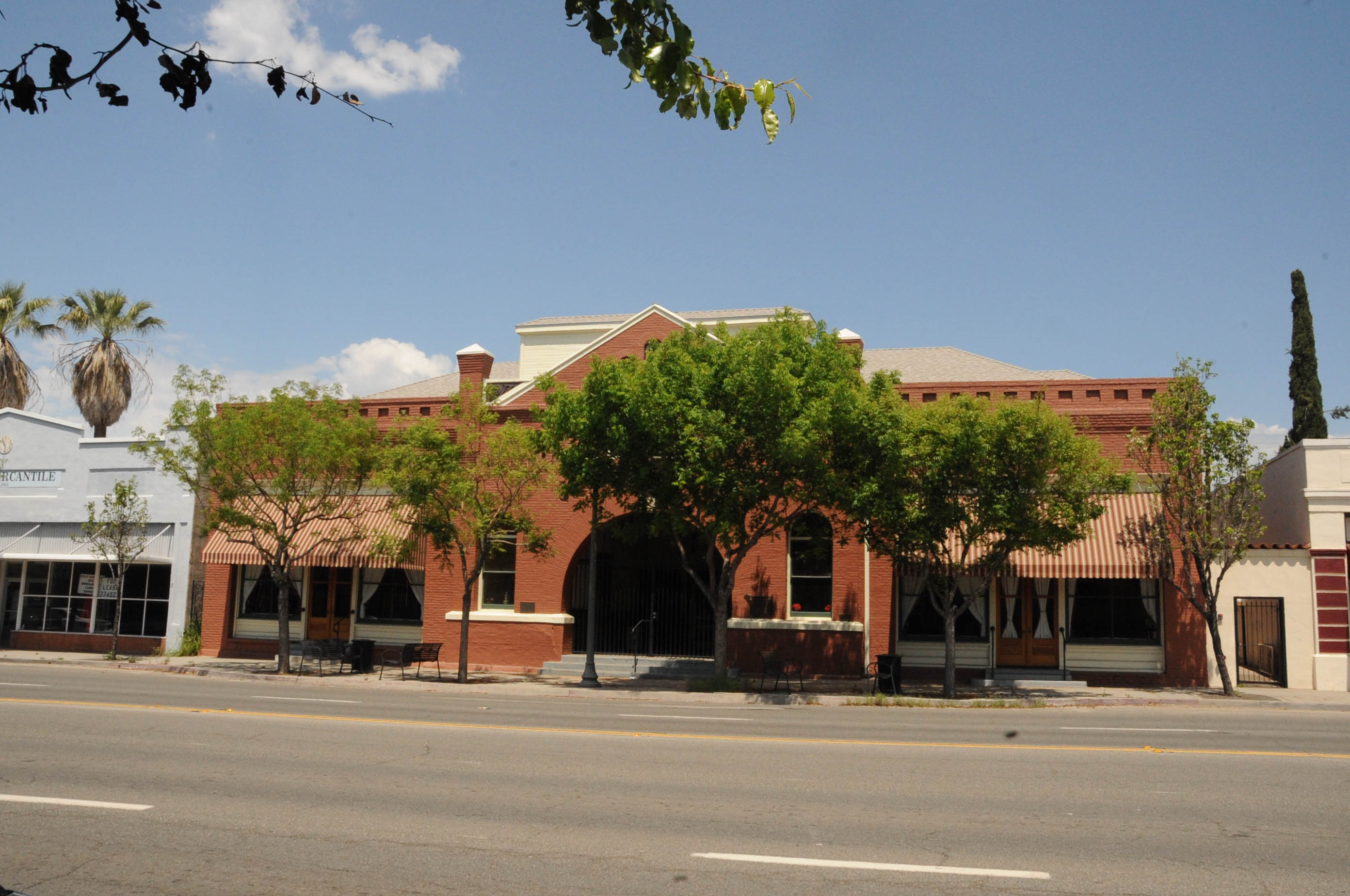
Ramona Town Hall

=== Local ===
As an unincorporated town, Ramona's plenary local governing body is the San Diego County Board of Supervisors. However, many governmental functions operate at the local level in Ramona.

The Ramona Municipal Water District (RMWD) is Ramona's local agency (within its boundaries) for water and sewer service, fire protection, paramedic services, and parks. The RMWD contracts with the California Department of Forestry and Fire Protection to operate the Ramona Fire Department. The RMWD is governed by a five-member elected board of directors.

In the area of Ramona outside and east of the Ramona Municipal Water District, fire protection and paramedic service is provided by the InterMountain Fire - Rescue Department. It operates as a California 501c(3) non-profit corporation, and up to 9 people sit on its board of directors. Portions of Ramona, notably the Barona Mesa area adjacent to San Diego Country Estates, are under the jurisdiction of the San Diego Rural Fire Protection District.

With one exception, public schools in Ramona are operated by the Ramona Unified School District, which is governed by an elected five-person board of trustees. The exception was Sun Valley Charter High School. Although its charter was approved by the RUSD, it was governed by its own board. The charter school failed after a few years from a decline in the number of students and political friction from the RUSD.

Ramona Adult School was established in 1993 by the Ramona Unified School District. Ramona Adult School is a provider of adult education services in Ramona, California and serves the communities of Ballena, Santa Ysabel, San Diego Country Estates, Four Corners, Barona Reservation, Fernbrook, San Pasqual Valley, and Wynola. At an elevation of 1,430 ft, the adult school campus is located on the grounds of Montecito high school which is nestled in beautiful and historic foothills of the noteworthy Cuyamaca Mountains. Ramona Adult School offers adult education courses for adults in the areas of: high school diploma, GED, HISET, and adult basic education. Ramona Adult School works collaboratively with Palomar College and other local adult schools to connect students with post-secondary education and training. Ramona Adult School is a member of the Education to Career Network of North San Diego County. ETCN is one of 71 Consortiums in the State of California and is funded by the California Adult Education Program.

The Nuevo Gardens Memorial Cemetery is a public cemetery located at 532 Ash Street and governed by a three-person Board of Trustees, who are appointed by the San Diego County Board of Supervisors.

=== State and federal representation ===
In the California State Legislature, Ramona is in the 40th senatorial district, represented by Republican Brian Jones, and in the 75th Assembly district, represented by Republican Carl DeMaio.

In the United States House of Representatives, Ramona is in California's 48th congressional district, represented by Republican Darrell Issa.

== Geography ==
According to the United States Geological Survey Ramona is located at 33°2′30″N 116°52′5″W within the Santa Maria Valley. This is near the intersection of State Route 67 and State Route 78 and near the economic center of Ramona. The elevation is 1,391 ft (424 m) above sea level (at Ramona Airport).

Because Ramona is not an incorporated city, there are no city limits by which to measure its area. There are primarily three geographic areas by which the land area of Ramona is measured: 1. The boundaries of the Ramona Municipal Water District (approximately 75 square miles (194 km^{2})); 2. The boundaries of the Ramona Unified School District (approximately 150 square miles (390 km^{2})), and; 3. The boundaries of the Ramona Community Planning Area. The last is the primary area utilized by San Diego County's regional planning agency, the San Diego Association of Governments (SANDAG).

The Ramona Community Planning Area encompasses more than 84,000 acres (340 km^{2}) (over 130 square miles (340 km^{2})) in central San Diego County. The RCPA includes the unincorporated town of Ramona, California, and is located in the foothills of the Laguna Mountains. It is located east northeast of the City of Poway (with which it shares a boundary), east southeast of the City of Escondido, north of Lakeside, California, and west southwest of Santa Ysabel, California.

The RCPA consists primarily of the Santa Maria Valley and the San Vicente Valley, and the steep or mountainous terrain surrounding them. It also includes the Ballena Valley east of town, and Bandy Canyon and a small portion of the southern edge of the San Pasqual Valley. In the San Pasqual Valley, the RCPA abuts the City of San Diego.

The historical town center of Ramona is located in the Santa Maria Valley. This valley was the Rancho Santa Maria, a Mexican land grant. The San Vicente Valley was formerly part of the Rancho Cañada de San Vicente y Mesa del Padre Barona Mexican land grant. The San Diego Country Estates subdivision in Ramona is located in the San Vicente Valley. The Barona Indian Reservation, not part of the RCPA, is also within part of the Rancho Cañada de San Vicente y Mesa del Padre Barona Mexican land grant.

According to the United States Census Bureau, the Ramona CDP covers an area of 38.4 square miles (99 km^{2}), 99.95% of it land, and 0.05% of it water.

== Climate ==
Ramona has a Mediterranean climate (Köppen Csa) typical of inland southern California, with a high diurnal temperature variation that averages 30.3 °F (16.8 °C) over the year. Official record temperatures since 1974 range from 16 °F (−8.9 °C) on January 17, 2007, up to 117 °F (47.2 °C) on July 6, 2018. Rainfall is higher than in San Diego and comparable to than falling in Los Angeles, with a "rain year" range since 1974 from just 4.55 inches or 115.6 millimeters between July 2001 and June 2002, to as much as 35.80 inches or 909.3 millimeters between July 1977 and June 1978. The most rainfall in one month has been 14.15 inches or 359.4 millimeters in January 1993, and the most in 24 hours 5.33 inches (135.4 mm) on January 10, 1978.

Climate data for Ramona Airport (1991–2020 normals, extremes 1974–present)
| Month | Jan | Feb | Mar | Apr | May | Jun | Jul | Aug | Sep | Oct | Nov | Dec | Year |
|---|---|---|---|---|---|---|---|---|---|---|---|---|---|
| Record high °F (°C) | 90 (32) | 89 (32) | 94 (34) | 98 (37) | 107 (42) | 109 (43) | 117 (47) | 111 (44) | 114 (46) | 105 (41) | 95 (35) | 94 (34) | 117 (47) |
| Mean maximum °F (°C) | 80.5 (26.9) | 80.6 (27.0) | 83.2 (28.4) | 89.0 (31.7) | 90.9 (32.7) | 96.2 (35.7) | 100.3 (37.9) | 102.0 (38.9) | 102.2 (39.0) | 96.1 (35.6) | 87.7 (30.9) | 80.2 (26.8) | 105.6 (40.9) |
| Mean daily maximum °F (°C) | 66.2 (19.0) | 65.9 (18.8) | 67.7 (19.8) | 71.7 (22.1) | 75.5 (24.2) | 82.9 (28.3) | 88.9 (31.6) | 90.8 (32.7) | 87.4 (30.8) | 80.0 (26.7) | 72.5 (22.5) | 65.6 (18.7) | 76.3 (24.6) |
| Daily mean °F (°C) | 51.4 (10.8) | 51.9 (11.1) | 53.8 (12.1) | 57.3 (14.1) | 62.2 (16.8) | 67.5 (19.7) | 73.2 (22.9) | 74.7 (23.7) | 71.2 (21.8) | 64.2 (17.9) | 56.4 (13.6) | 50.6 (10.3) | 61.2 (16.2) |
| Mean daily minimum °F (°C) | 36.5 (2.5) | 37.9 (3.3) | 39.8 (4.3) | 42.8 (6.0) | 48.9 (9.4) | 52.0 (11.1) | 57.5 (14.2) | 58.7 (14.8) | 54.9 (12.7) | 48.5 (9.2) | 40.3 (4.6) | 35.6 (2.0) | 46.1 (7.8) |
| Mean minimum °F (°C) | 25.9 (−3.4) | 28.3 (−2.1) | 30.7 (−0.7) | 33.4 (0.8) | 39.0 (3.9) | 43.2 (6.2) | 47.6 (8.7) | 47.8 (8.8) | 43.8 (6.6) | 36.6 (2.6) | 29.9 (−1.2) | 25.1 (−3.8) | 23.0 (−5.0) |
| Record low °F (°C) | 16 (−9) | 19 (−7) | 24 (−4) | 24 (−4) | 29 (−2) | 31 (−1) | 37 (3) | 37 (3) | 32 (0) | 26 (−3) | 21 (−6) | 17 (−8) | 16 (−9) |
| Average rainfall inches (mm) | 3.10 (79) | 3.66 (93) | 2.30 (58) | 1.00 (25) | 0.41 (10) | 0.06 (1.5) | 0.10 (2.5) | 0.04 (1.0) | 0.15 (3.8) | 0.69 (18) | 1.06 (27) | 2.08 (53) | 14.65 (372) |
| Average rainy days (≥ 0.01 in) | 6.6 | 8.2 | 7.2 | 6.0 | 4.1 | 1.6 | 0.8 | 1.1 | 1.6 | 3.8 | 4.8 | 7.1 | 52.9 |
Source: NOAA

== Demographics ==
Historical population
| Census | Pop. | Note | %± |
|---|---|---|---|
| 1950 | 1,158 | | — |
| 1960 | 2,449 | | 111.5% |
| 1970 | 3,554 | | 45.1% |
| 1980 | 8,173 | | 130.0% |
| 1990 | 13,040 | | 59.5% |
| 2000 | 15,691 | | 20.3% |
| 2010 | 20,292 | | 29.3% |
| 2020 | 21,468 | | 5.8% |
U.S. Decennial Census; 1860–1870 1880-1890; 1900 1910 1920; 1930 1940 1950; 1960 1970 1980; 1990 2000 2010; 2020

Ramona was listed as an unincorporated place in the 1950 U.S. census; and then as a census designated place in the 1980 U.S. census.

=== Racial and ethnic composition ===
Ramona CDP, California – Racial and ethnic composition Note: the US Census treats Hispanic/Latino as an ethnic category. This table excludes Latinos from the racial categories and assigns them to a separate category. Hispanics/Latinos may be of any race.
| Race / Ethnicity (NH = Non-Hispanic) | Pop 2000 | Pop 2010 | Pop 2020 | % 2000 | % 2010 | % 2020 |
|---|---|---|---|---|---|---|
| White alone (NH) | 11,013 | 12,985 | 12,545 | 70.19% | 63.99% | 58.44% |
| Black or African American alone (NH) | 117 | 118 | 146 | 0.75% | 0.58% | 0.68% |
| Native American or Alaska Native alone (NH) | 160 | 139 | 173 | 1.02% | 0.68% | 0.81% |
| Asian alone (NH) | 119 | 268 | 322 | 0.76% | 1.32% | 1.50% |
| Native Hawaiian or Pacific Islander alone (NH) | 40 | 54 | 53 | 0.25% | 0.27% | 0.25% |
| Other race alone (NH) | 31 | 23 | 108 | 0.20% | 0.11% | 0.50% |
| Mixed race or Multiracial (NH) | 290 | 371 | 1,019 | 1.85% | 1.83% | 4.75% |
| Hispanic or Latino (any race) | 3,921 | 6,334 | 7,102 | 24.99% | 31.21% | 33.08% |
| Total | 15,691 | 20,292 | 21,468 | 100.00% | 100.00% | 100.00% |

=== 2010 ===
==== Ramona CDP ====
At the 2010 census Ramona had a population of 20,292. The population density was 528.0 inhabitants per square mile (203.9/km^{2}). The racial makeup of Ramona was 15,887 (78.3%) White, 139 (0.7%) African American, 224 (1.1%) Native American, 279 (1.4%) Asian, 71 (0.3%) Pacific Islander, 2,965 (14.6%) from other races, and 727 (3.6%) from two or more races. Hispanic or Latino of any race were 6,334 persons (31.2%).

The census reported that 20,168 people (99.4% of the population) lived in households, 114 (0.6%) lived in non-institutionalized group quarters, and 10 (0%) were institutionalized.

There were 6,627 households, 2,631 (39.7%) had children under the age of 18 living in them, 3,893 (58.7%) were opposite-sex married couples living together, 788 (11.9%) had a female householder with no husband present, 425 (6.4%) had a male householder with no wife present. There were 419 (6.3%) unmarried opposite-sex partnerships, and 62 (0.9%) same-sex married couples or partnerships. 1,091 households (16.5%) were one person and 429 (6.5%) had someone living alone who was 65 or older. The average household size was 3.04. There were 5,106 families (77.0% of households); the average family size was 3.36.

The age distribution was 5,247 people (25.9%) under the age of 18, 2,140 people (10.5%) aged 18 to 24, 4,901 people (24.2%) aged 25 to 44, 5,945 people (29.3%) aged 45 to 64, and 2,059 people (10.1%) who were 65 or older. The median age was 36.7 years. For every 100 females, there were 101.0 males. For every 100 females age 18 and over, there were 99.4 males.

There were 7,083 housing units at an average density of 184.3 per square mile, of the occupied units 4,187 (63.2%) were owner-occupied and 2,440 (36.8%) were rented. The homeowner vacancy rate was 1.8%; the rental vacancy rate was 6.1%. 12,399 people (61.1% of the population) lived in owner-occupied housing units and 7,769 people (38.3%) lived in rental housing units.

==== Ramona, including San Diego Country Estates CDP ====
The 2010 United States census reported that Ramona CDP and San Diego Country Estates CDP combined had a population of 30,301. The racial makeup of this combination was 24,994 (82.5%) White, 230 (0.8%) African American, 314 (1.0%) Native American, 426 (1.4%) Asian, 105 (0.3%) Pacific Islander, 3,041 (10.0%) from other races, and 1,091 (3.6%) from two or more races. Hispanic or Latino of any race were 7,460 persons (24.6%).

=== 2000 ===
The United States census of 2000 included two census-designated places (CDP) - Ramona CDP and San Diego Country Estate CDP. Some areas of Ramona were not included in any CDP.

The U.S. Census Bureau created a new statistical entity for tabulating summary statistics from Census 2000 by ZIP code, the Zip Code Tabulation Area (ZCTA). Ramona has a single United States Postal Service ZIP code: 92065.

The San Diego Association of Governments (SANDAG), San Diego County's regional planning agency, has compiled census data for all census tracts in the Ramona Community Planning Area (RCPA). These statistics are slightly different than the 92065 ZCTA, as the RCPA includes some land area outside the 92065 ZIP code. (Map of RCPA)

2000 census information for the Ramona CDP, the San Diego Country Estate CDP, 92065 ZCTA, and the RCPA (as prepared by SANDAG), is set forth below.

==== 92065 ZCTA ====
At the 2000 census, there were 33,087 people living in the 92065 Zip Code Tabulation Area.

==== RCPA ====
At the 2000 census, there were 33,404 people, 10,803 households, and 8,814 families living in the RCPA. The population density was 254.5 inhabitants per square mile (98.3/km^{2}). There were 11,190 housing units at an average density of 85.6 per square mile (33.1/km^{2}). The racial makeup of the RCPA was 78.35% White, 0.67% African American, 0.81% Native American, 0.97% Asian, 0.20% Pacific Islander, 0.16% from other races, and 1.82% from two or more races. Hispanic or Latino of any race were 17.03% of the population.

There were 10,803 households, 45.8% had children under the age of 18 living with them, 68.5% were married couples living together, 8.67% had a female householder with no husband present, and 18.41% were non-families. 13.2% of households were made up of individuals. The average household size was 3.09 and the average family size was 3.79.

In the RCPA the population was spread out, with 30.03% under the age of 18, 8.08% from 18 to 24, 29.01% from 25 to 44, 23.53% from 45 to 64, and 9.34% 65 or older. The median age was 35.7 years. For every 100 females, there were 101.6 males. For every 100 females age 18 and over, there were 90.3 males.

The median household income was in the RCPA was $60,534. The per capita income for the RCPA was $19,576. About 5.3% of families and 9% of the population were below the poverty line. Only 3.57% of families including a married couple were below the poverty line, while 13.98% of male-headed households with no wife present and 14.62% of female-headed households with no husband present fell below the poverty line.

Of the population 15 years of age or older, 63% were married (excluding separated), 23% had never been married, 8% were divorced, 4% were widowed, and 1% were separated. Of those 25 or older 86.34% had graduated high school (including GEDs), and 31.1% had attended college, but had not earned a degree. 8% of this group had earned an associate degree, 15% a bachelor's degree and 6% a masters. 2% had gone on to earn a professional school degree, and 1% had earned a doctorate.

72.2% of housing units were owner occupied, with the median value of these set at $240,137. Of all housing units in the RCPA, 82.71% were built in 1970 or later, and 55.1% were built in 1980 or later.

96.03% of occupied households had at least one motor vehicle, and 75.49% had two or more vehicles. For those employed, the average travel time to work was 36 minutes. 14.76% had travel times to work of 60 minutes or more.

==== Ramona CDP ====
According to the United States Census Bureau the Ramona CDP is located at 33°2′9″N 116°52′14″W (33.035868, -116.870633).

At the 2000 census there were 15,691 people, 5,021 households, and 3,886 families living in the CDP. The population density was 1,026.9 inhabitants per square mile (396.5/km^{2}). There were 5,131 housing units at an average density of 335.8 per square mile (129.7/km^{2}). The racial makeup of the CDP was 80.60% White, 0.78% African American, 1.33% Native American, 0.78% Asian, 0.27% Pacific Islander, 12.56% from other races, and 3.68% from two or more races. Hispanic or Latino of any race were 24.99%. According to the United States Census Bureau, the CDP has a total area of 15.3 square miles (40 km^{2}), all land.

Of the 5,021 households 43.6% had children under the age of 18 living with them, 60.1% were married couples living together, 11.6% had a female householder with no husband present, and 22.6% were non-families. 16.1% of households were one person and 6.5% were one person aged 65 or older. The average household size was 3.10 and the average family size was 3.45.

The age distribution was 31.2% under the age of 18, 10.3% from 18 to 24, 30.3% from 25 to 44, 20.1% from 45 to 64, and 8.2% 65 or older. The median age was 31 years. For every 100 females, there were 101.3 males. For every 100 females age 18 and over, there were 99.4 males.

The median household income was $48,625 and the median family income was $53,372. Males had a median income of $40,376 versus $26,105 for females. The per capita income for the CDP was $18,898. About 9.1% of families and 12.8% of the population were below the poverty line, including 16.0% of those under age 18 and 7.1% of those age 65 or over.

==== San Diego Country Estates CDP ====
According to the United States Census Bureau the San Diego Country Estates CDP is located at 33°0′9″N 116°47′56″W (33.002636, -116.799005). The CDP has a total area of 17.0 square miles (44 km^{2}), all land.

At the 2000 census there were 9,262 people, 2,992 households, and 2,650 families living in the CDP. The population density was 545.9 inhabitants per square mile (210.8/km^{2}). There were 3,102 housing units at an average density of 182.8 per square mile (70.6/km^{2}). The racial makeup of the CDP was 92.92% White, 0.72% African American, 0.49% Native American, 1.12% Asian, 0.27% Pacific Islander, 1.72% from other races, and 2.76% from two or more races. Hispanic or Latino of any race were 7.70%.

Of the 2,992 households 47.5% had children under the age of 18 living with them, 80.0% were married couples living together, 6.0% had a female householder with no husband present, and 11.4% were non-families. 8.4% of households were one person and 3.6% were one person aged 65 or older. The average household size was 3.10 and the average family size was 3.27.

The age distribution was 31.6% under the age of 18, 5.5% from 18 to 24, 29.5% from 25 to 44, 23.2% from 45 to 64, and 10.2% 65 or older. The median age was 38 years. For every 100 females, there were 98.3 males. For every 100 females age 18 and over, there were 96.4 males.

The median household income was $77,547 and the median family income was $79,409. Males had a median income of $55,825 versus $34,472 for females. The per capita income for the CDP was $27,685. About 2.6% of families and 3.4% of the population were below the poverty line, including 3.3% of those under age 18 and 1.0% of those age 65 or over.

== Agriculture ==
At one time Ramona was known as the "Turkey Capital of the World." Turkey production flourished during the 1930s, and the industry was featured with popular annual Turkey Days celebrations. Turkey production went into sharp decline following World War II, and ended completely by 1959.

The decline of the turkey industry was followed by rapid growth in the chicken egg business. Egg production, which began in the 1920s, thrived into the 1970s. In 1970, there were about 50 egg ranches in Ramona. Today, most of the chicken ranches are gone. By 2003, only four remained. A notable exception to the decline is the Pine Hills Egg Ranch, which at 1,100,000 birds is the 58th largest nationally, and the 5th largest in the state of California. The demise of the egg industry was, in part, due to population growth and increased land values. It was also caused by an outbreak of deadly exotic Newcastle's Disease in 1971, which took three years to stem, and another outbreak in late 2002.

Dairies used to be common in Ramona, particularly along contiguous Dye Road, Ramona Street and Warnock Road. Today, one dairy remains on Dye Road.

Notable among current agricultural pursuits in Ramona is rapidly growing wine grape production. The 89,000-acre (360 km^{2}) Ramona Valley American Viticultural Area surrounds the town. An aerial photograph depicting the Ramona Valley Viticultural Area may be viewed at the https://ramonavalleyvineyards.com Ramona Valley Vineyard Association's website].

Although the cost of imported water has been a negative issue in recent years, avocado and citrus orchards are also prominent.

Perhaps Ramona's greatest recent claim to fame comes from Thoroughbred horse breeding. The Golden Eagle Farm in eastern Ramona's Ballena Valley was the home of Best Pal, the second-place finisher of the 1991 Kentucky Derby. No California bred race horse has earned more than the US$5.6 million in purses he won. Best Pal is buried on the Golden Eagle Farm.

== Culture ==
Ramona is the filming location for the films South of 8 (2016), The Samuel Project (2018), Continuance, Why the Nativity? (2022), and Hemet, or the Landlady Don't Drink Tea (2023).

== Notable residents ==
- Budd Boetticher - film and television director, producer; died in Ramona
- Johnny Borneman, III - American racecar driver
- William Thomas Burns - Major League Baseball player; died in Ramona
- William Cagney - film producer, brother of James Cagney, owned a ranch in Ramona
- Dave Cripe - baseball player; born in Ramona
- Jake Gagne – motorcycle racer; was born and grew up in Ramona
- John Hopkins - motorcycle racer, MotoGP, Superbike World Championship
- Ross Martin - actor, The Wild Wild West; died in Ramona
- Archie Moore - boxer, light-heavyweight world champion 1952–62, actor; owned training camp in Ramona, where a street is named for him
- Larry Poole - actor and film producer
- Casey Tibbs - rodeo cowboy and actor; died in Ramona
- Dai Vernon - magician; died in Ramona
- Nick Vincent - Major League Baseball pitcher; attended Ramona High School
- Lynda Wiesmeier - Playboy Playmate, Miss July 1982; died in Ramona
- Stanley B. Wilson - Labor leader and newspaper publisher; preached in Ramona and edited the Ramona Sentinel

== See also ==
- Ramona Airport
- Ramona High School (Ramona, CA)
- Ramona Valley Viticultural Area
- San Diego Association of Governments
