= Puerto Paraíso =

Mall in Cabo San Lucas, Mexico

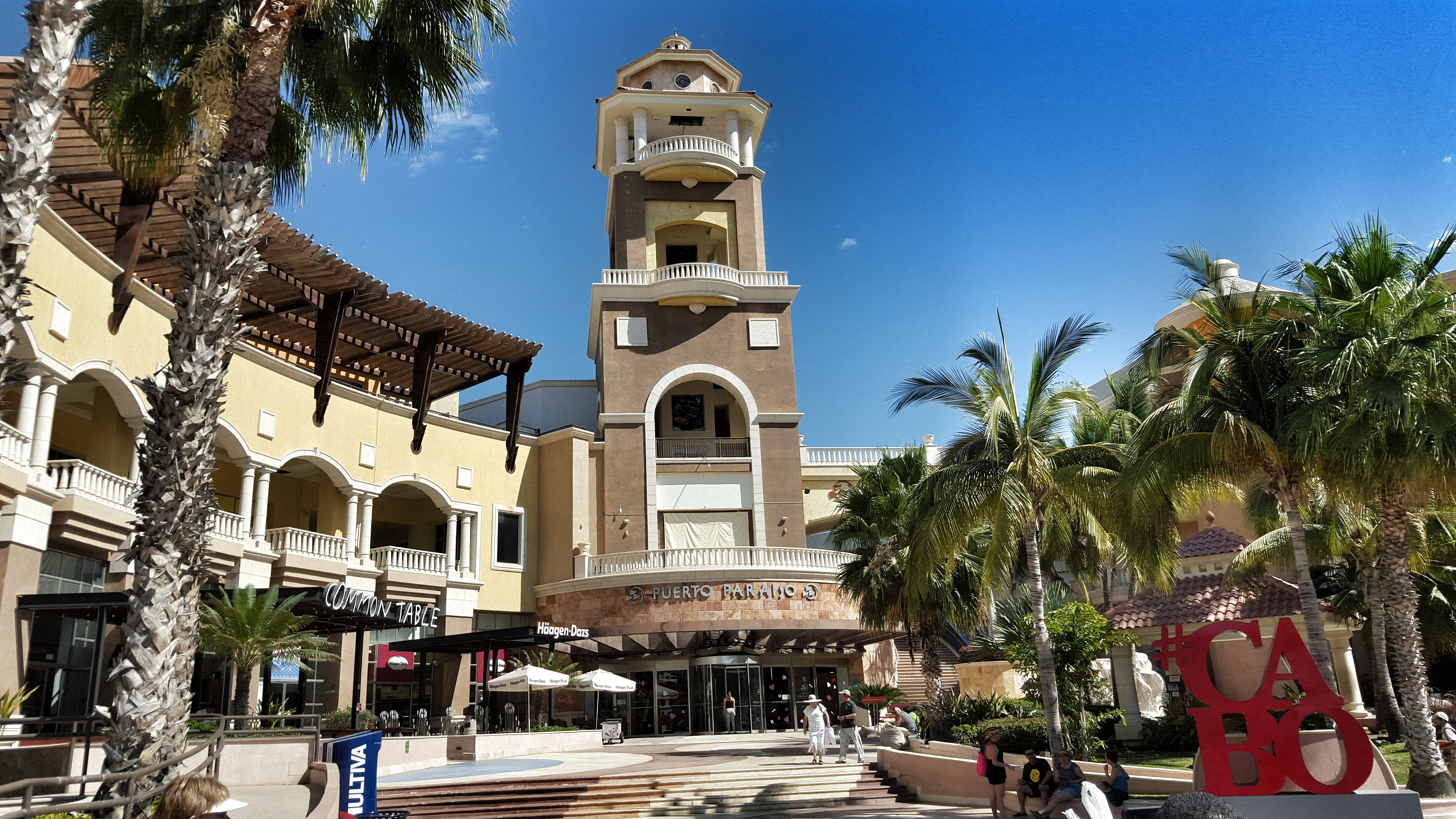
- The exterior of the mall in 2016
- Coordinates: 22.8870°N 109.9094°W
- Address: Boulevard Lázaro Cárdenas 1501 Cabo San Lucas, Baja California Sur, Mexico
- Opened: 2001; 25 years ago
- Developer: Grupo Frel
- Num. of stores: 126 (2008)
- Floor area: 12 acres (4.9 ha; 49,000 m^{2})
- Floors: 3
- Website: puertoparaiso.mx

Puerto Paraíso (literally Paradise Port) is a mall in Cabo San Lucas, Baja California Sur, Mexico. It is also known as Puerto Paraíso Entertainment Complex, Puerto Paraíso Mall, and Plaza Puerto Paraíso. Opened in late 2001, Puerto Paraíso was developed by Ramon Marcos and constructed by the Mexico City-based real estate developer Grupo Frel. The mall's architecture blends traditional Mexican colonial style with modern features, including fountains, waterfalls, and sculptures. It is next to the marina and the Luxury Avenue shopping mall and is situated between Plaza Bonita Mall and Marina Fiesta Resort. Spanning 12 acres (4.9 ha; 49,000 m^{2}), the three-storey mall had 126 stores in 2008.

Puerto Paraíso's target customer base is people with upscale preferences. It has entertainment venues including a video arcade, a bowling alley, and a Cinemex cinema, which serves as one of the venues for the yearly Los Cabos International Film Festival. Its dining options include a food court and a Ruth's Chris Steak House. It houses numerous retail options including both Western and Mexican brands. Chedraui Selecto, a supermarket, and the Liverpool department store opened branches in the mall. Visitors interested in arts and crafts can visit galleries showcasing works from local Mexican artists.

== Location and architecture ==
Puerto Paraíso is a mall in downtown Cabo San Lucas, Baja California Sur, Mexico. Located next to the marina, it is three stories, is an open-air mall and occupies over 12 acres (4.9 ha; 49,000 m^{2}) of indoor area. Puerto Paraíso occupies a significant part of the waterfront and spans multiple blocks. After the mall's launch, the surrounding downtown shopping streets and the Boulevard Marina began being dubbed "Old Town". It is between the Plaza Bonita Mall and Marina Fiesta Resort's Golden Zone Shopping Center and next to the Luxury Avenue shopping mall. Reachable from within Puerto Paraíso, Luxury Avenue is a luxury boutique mall.

Puerto Paraíso's design fuses traditional Mexican colonial style with contemporary features. Mosaics made of marble and cantera are set into the flooring. The mall has a tower, fountains at its entryway, and a bright garden, and is decorated with waterfalls and sculptures. It has indoor stores and open air areas with manicured terraces. It had paid parking at an underground multistorey parking structure. The parking structure has charging stations for electric vehicles.

== History ==
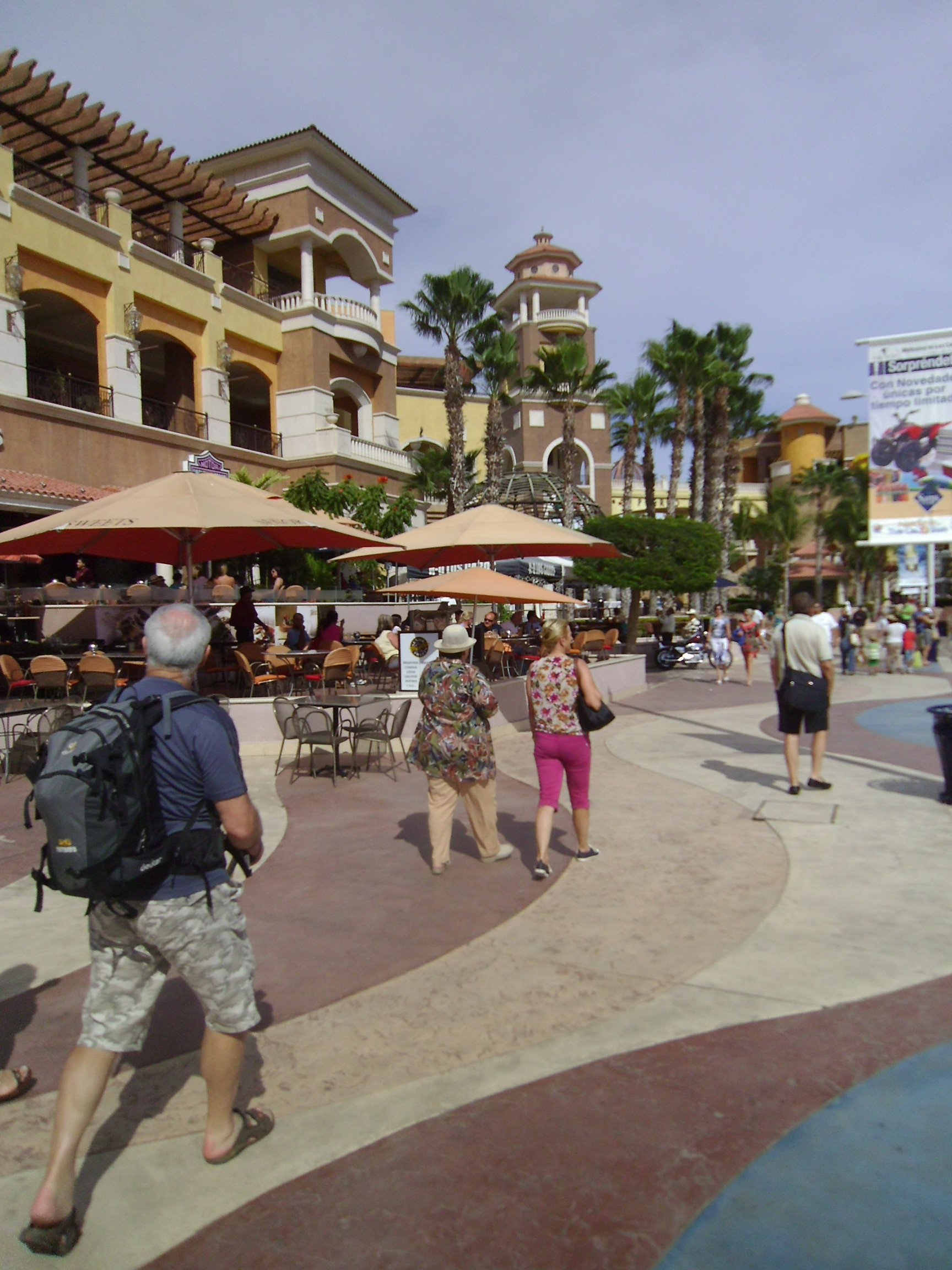
The exterior of the mall in 2011

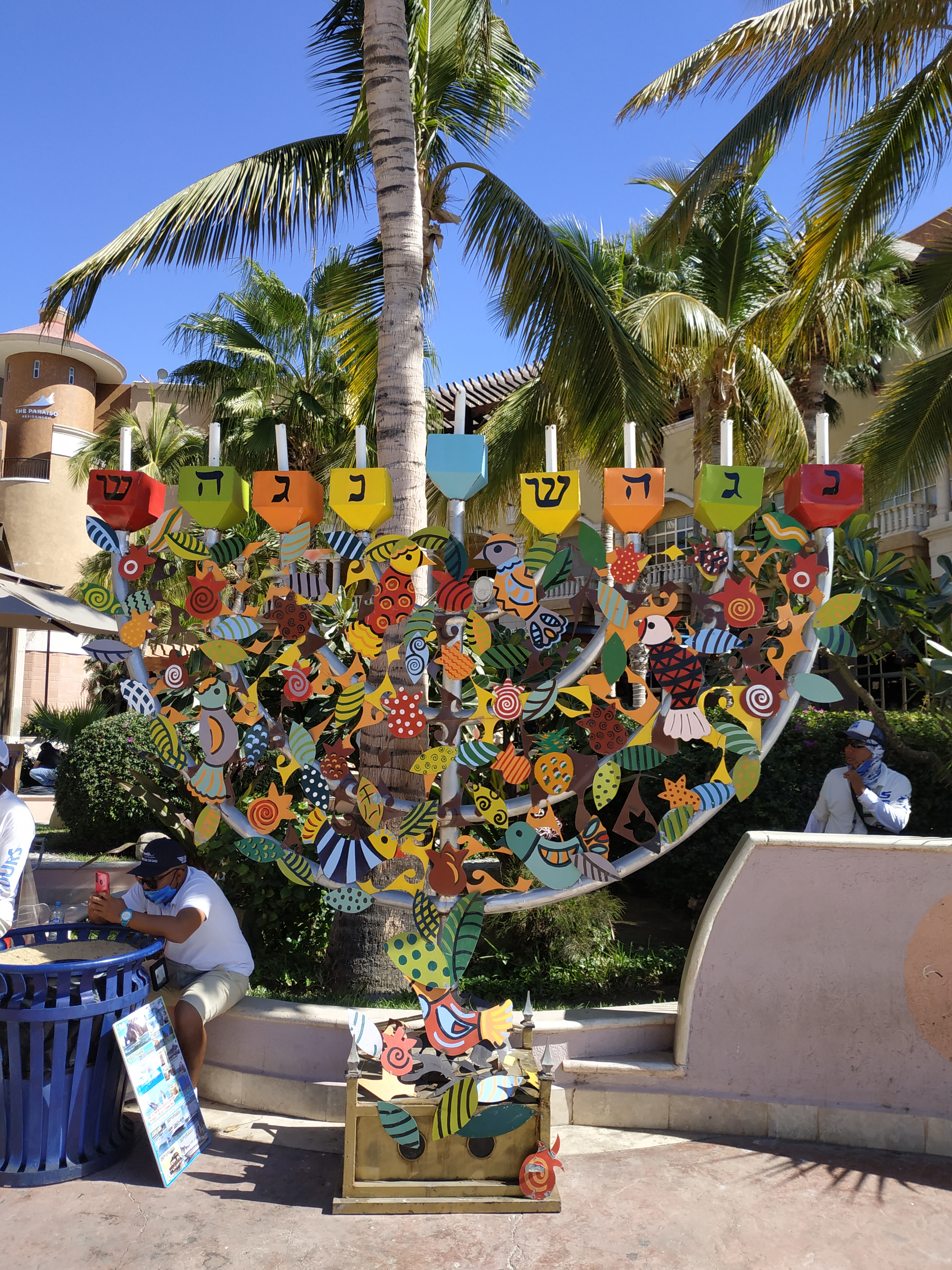
The exterior of the mall in 2021

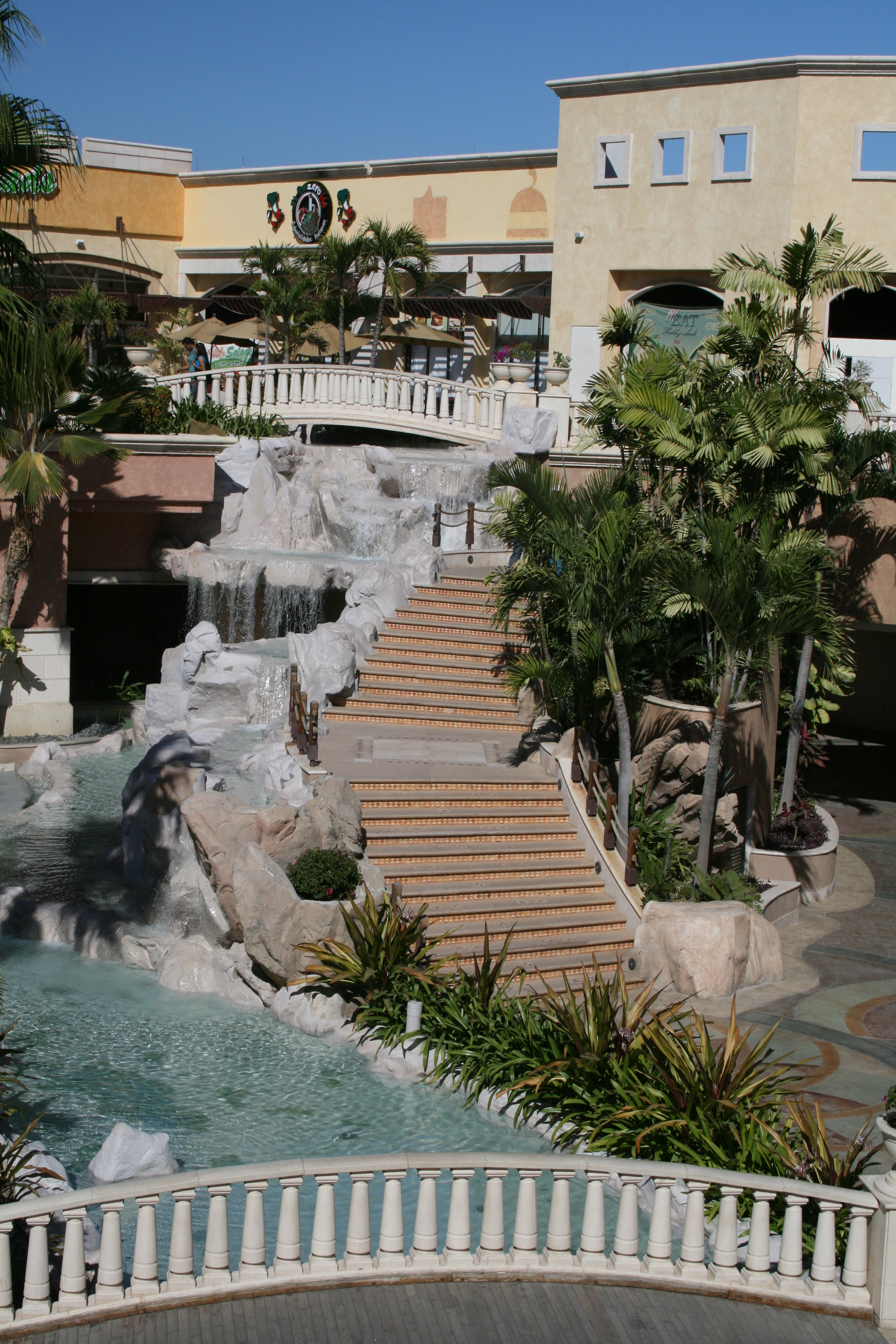
The mall's waterfall in 2010

Puerto Paraíso was built by the real estate developer Grupo Frel, a Mexico City–based architectural firm and its developer was Ramon Marcos. It began operating in the fourth quarter of 2001. The mall's target customer base consisted of people who with upscale preferences, and it aimed to give both local residents and visitors eateries, retail outlets, and entertainment options. Sandra A. Berry of Los Cabos Magazine said that before Puerto Paraíso's launch, Cabo San Lucas was viewed as "a T-shirt town". She said that the mall's debut altered that impression through its "marble, granite, escalators, elevators, and store windows full of eye candy". According to Berry, Puerto Paraíso was Baja California Sur's most visionary shopping mall when it was built.

Shortly after the mall opened, The Spokesman-Review's Dan Webster in 2003 cited it as an example of how Cabo San Lucas now showed only a hint of its classic appeal. He said that the "sparkling" mall made Cabo San Lucas resemble the Beverly Hills shopping street Rodeo Drive more than a place rooted in Mexican heritage. According to The San Diego Union-Tribune, the mall was largely deserted in 2003. At the beginning of the 2003 Cabo Jazz Festival, the jazz musicians Joyce Cooling, Gregg Karukas, and Brenda Russell gave performances at the mall. About 50% of the mall was in use in 2006, and around 126 outlets were housed there in 2008. Frommer's travel writer Lynne Bairstow said in 2006 that the mall inaccurately claimed to feature designer retailers. She stated that an outlet might have at most two branded products and numerous spaces remain empty. Despite the criticism, she liked that it offered a good selection of souvenirs and swimming attire.

The mall was one of eight properties held by the real estate holding company Fibra Shop in 2013. Since Baja California Sur frequently is subject to drought, the mall financed desalination systems that do reverse osmosis to produce drinking water. When the yearly Los Cabos International Film Festival takes place, the mall's Cinemex, a cinema, serves as one of the venues. While publicizing Fast & Furious 6 for its Mexican premiere in 2013, Vin Diesel, Paul Walker, Dwayne Johnson, and Michelle Rodriguez visited the mall.

The mall experienced a series of safety incidents at the beginning of 2026. In January 2026, Chedraui Selecto, a supermarket in the mall, was shut down after a gas leak in its bakery. While the fire department and civil protection team reviewed the property, about 600 people vacated the mall. The following month, a gas smell at the mall caused people to evacuate. When inspectors from Protección Civil and the Cabo San Lucas Fire Department detected safety concerns at Puerto Paraíso, the Los Cabos Municipality ordered the temporary closure of the mall in April 2026. According to Juan Antonio Carbajal Figueroa, the fire chief, there was an elevated hazard since the mall that month had six logged reports and its fire protection equipment was out of service. One report was an April 8 warning about a potential gas leak, though it was not substantiated. The same day, in an unrelated incident the utility register on the sidewalk by a primary entrypoint had an electrical blast, which generated smoke.

One day before the mall's closure, a water pipe had burst. As a result, some of the retail outlets had to evacuate due to the flooding and falling ceiling panels. City officials said the purpose of the closure was to avoid harm to public safety rather than penalizing the mall since the vicinity is frequented by visitors and residents. Following multiple days of inspections by city officials, Puerto Paraíso resumed operations. The city allowed the mall's first floor and its parking garage's first floor to reopen and said subject to further inspections, the rest of the mall would be opened later.

== Tenants ==
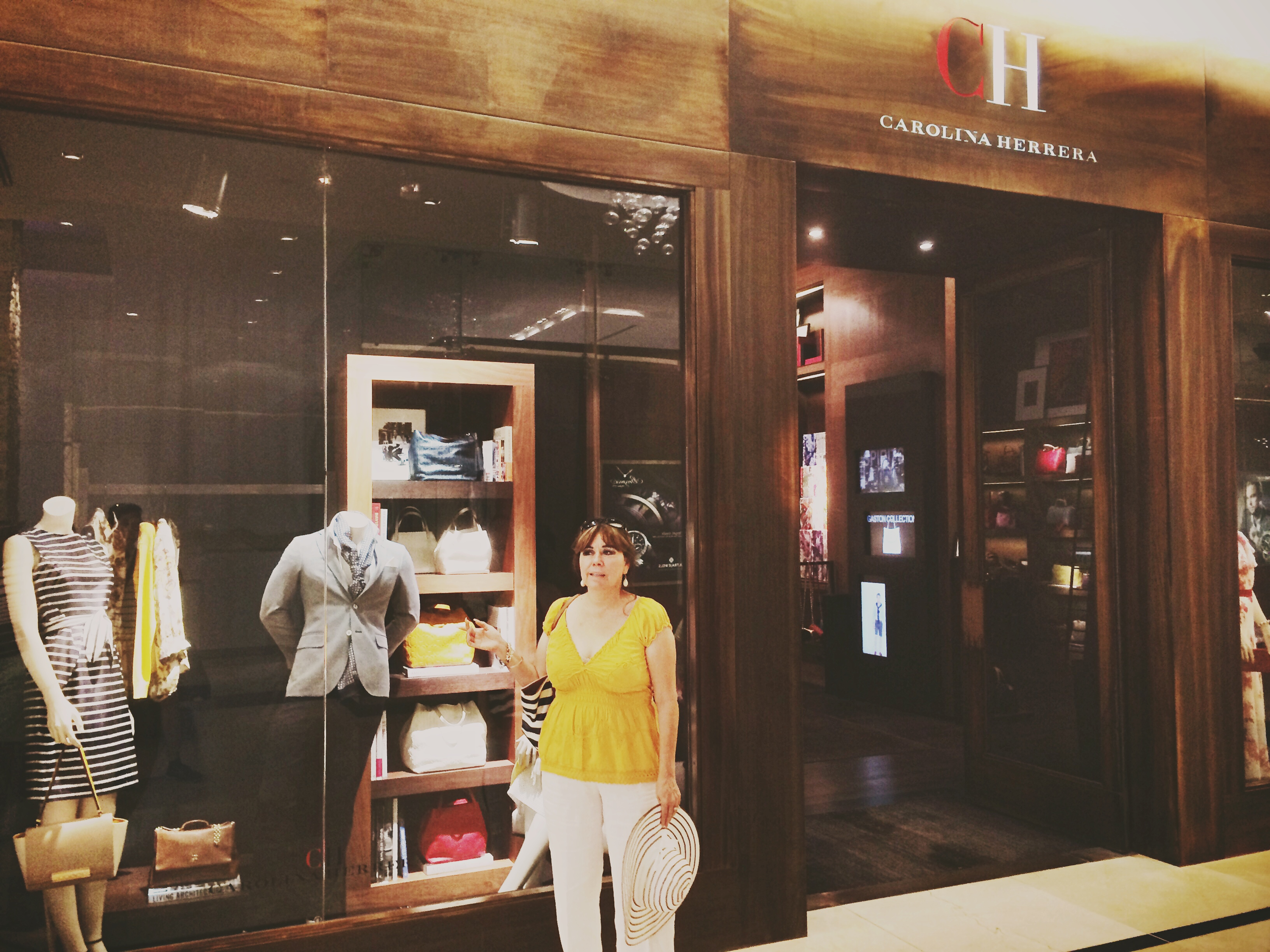
A Carolina Herrera outlet in the mall in 2014

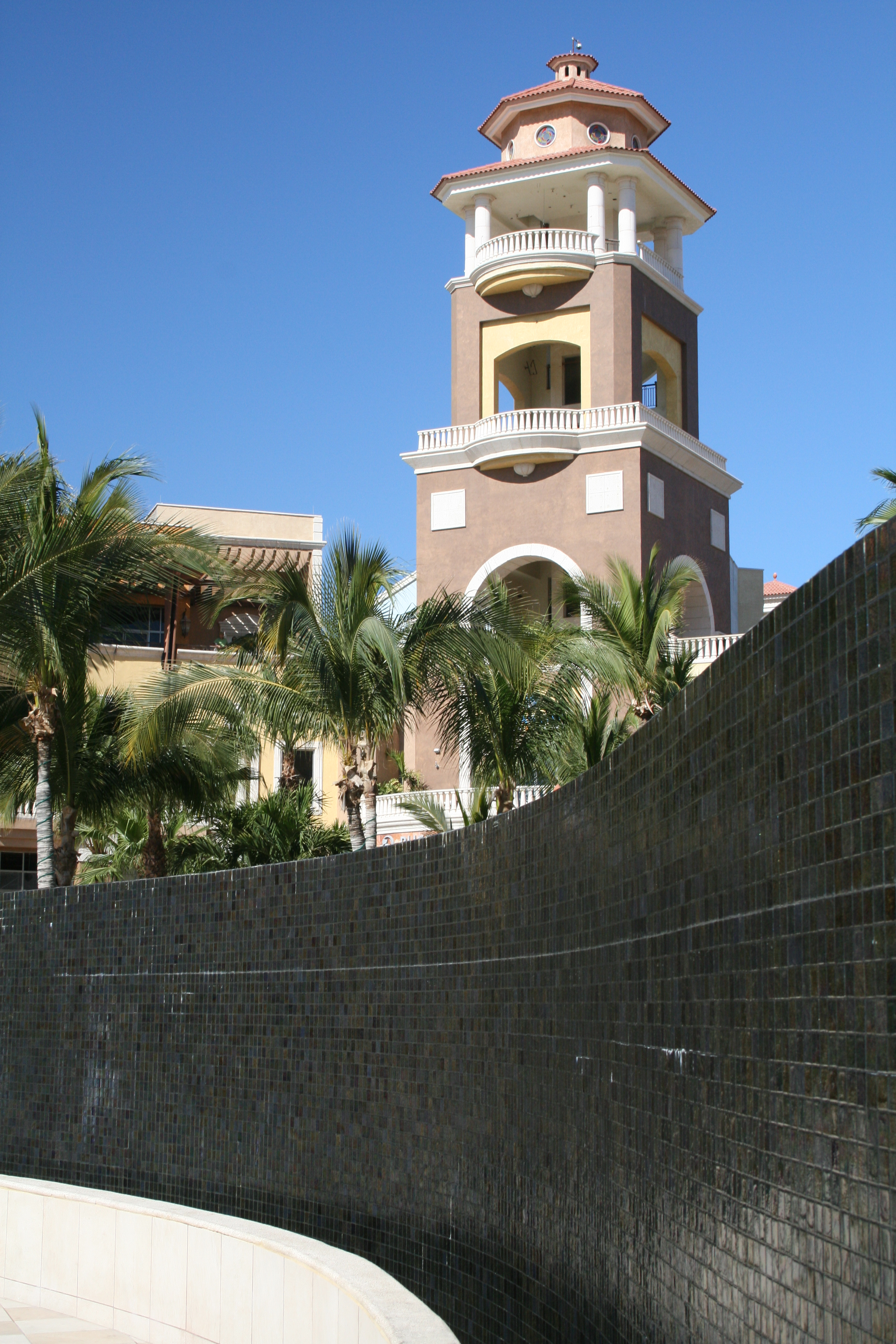
The exterior of the mall in 2010

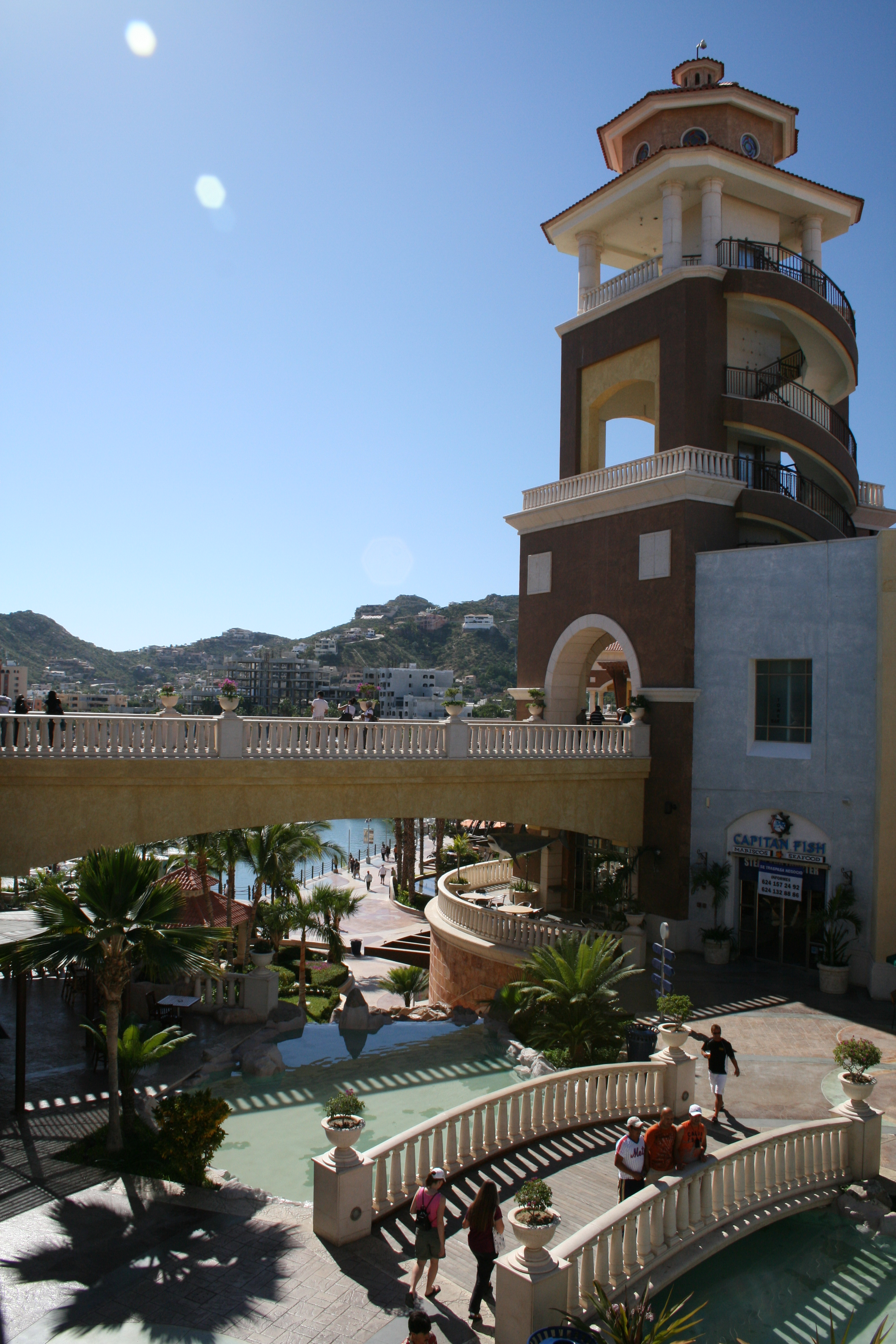
The exterior of the mall in 2010

Puerto Paraíso houses entertainment options, worldwide chains, restaurants, luxury jewelry stores, and upscale boutiques. At its opening, the first floor had brands recognized in Western countries including Dolce & Gabbana, Guess, Mossimo, and Quiksilver. The artist Kaki Bassi created a gallery that featured her cave-inspired pieces. Her two-story gallery also featured pieces from Mexican artists. The mall's retail outlets shortly after it opened included several jewelry shops, a lingerie store, and a Häagen-Dazs. In the early 2000s, Puerto Paraíso housed Wild Coyote, a nightclub, that closed after a year. At the end of 2001, the Atlanta steakhouse chain Ruth's Chris Steak House began operating in the mall. Opened by Ramon Marcos, the mall's developer, it had capacity for 180 diners. Additional food venues on the ground floor included Houlihan's, Johnny Rockets, 100% Natural, and Cinamomo Cocina and Lounge. A food court was located on the mall's higher levels and soon after the mall opened included the outlets Burger King, Domino's, McDonald's, Subway, and Taco Inn. Around 2015, another food court opened in the mall's mezzanine, offering Mexican, Greek, and Peruvian cuisine. It has an outdoor terrace that gives diners a harbor view.

Puerto Paraíso had an art gallery in 2006 that featured pieces from Mexican women artists. The Sinaloan artist Sergio Bustamante opened Galeria Sergio Bustamante to showcase his pieces including handbags, jewelry, and sculptures. Other arts and crafts venues in the mid-2000s included Mata Ortiz pottery from Macario Ortiz, ofrendas from Alfonso Castillo, and alebrije made of papier-mâché from Joel Garcia. The mall housed an office for the Baja California Sur's Secretariat of Tourism in 2011. That year, in response to the surge of tourism to Baja California Sur, the state's attorney general created an agency dedicated to prosecute crimes directed at tourists and established it in the same site as the Secretariat of Tourism. Harley-Davidson Los Cabos was located in the mall in 2015. It had motorcycles for rent and motorcycle attire for purchase including leather jackets, shirts, and hats. The mall had a Curves International gym in 2013 as well as a MacStore and a Forever 21 in 2017.

The mall has a video arcade and a bowling alley with 12 lanes. Cinema Paraíso, its Cinemex movie theater, has 10 screens and is on the third floor. The fourth screen features seats that recline. Cinemex screens English-language and Spanish-language films. The mall offers services including a bank branch containing ATMs, a currency exchange point, and pharmacies. It houses Chedraui Selecto, a supermarket, that has a bakery and the Liverpool department store.

The mall's fashion shops offer trendy vacation apparel, swim attire, shoes, hats, and sunglasses. Puerto Paraíso houses various retailers that offer Mexican-produced artisan and handcrafted products. The stores offer speciality foods such as regionally produced honey and organic chocolate as well as toys, textiles, and pottery. Both American and Mexican brands housed outlets in the mall in 2016 including Tommy Bahama, Kenneth Cole, Lacoste, Nautica, Pineda Covalin, and Sunglass Hut.
