= List of companies traded on the Mexican Stock Exchange =

List of companies traded on the Bolsa Mexicana de Valores (Mexican Stock Exchange) sorted by revenues and classified according to GICS.

== List ==
Name	Ticker Symbol	Revenues US$ millions (2014)	Sector	Industry	Sub-Industry
America Movil, S.A.B. de C.V.	AMXB	63,455	Telecom Services	Wireless Telecom	Wireless Telecom
Walmart de Mexico, S.A.B. de C.V.	WALMEX*	33,161	Consumer Staples	Food & Staples Retailing	Hypermarkets & Super Centers
Fomento Economico Mexicano, S.A.B. de C.V.	FEMSAUBD	19,810	Consumer Staples	Beverages	Soft Drinks
Alfa, S.A.B. de C.V.	ALFAA	17,211	Industrials	Industrial Conglomerates	Industrial Conglomerates
Cemex, S.A.B. de C.V.	CEMEXCPO	15,793	Materials	Construction Materials	Construction Materials
Grupo Bimbo, S.A.B. de C.V.	BIMBOA	14,066	Consumer Staples	Food Products	Packaged Foods & Meats
Coca-Cola FEMSA S.A.B. de C.V.	KOFUBL	11,076	Consumer Staples	Beverages	Soft Drinks
Grupo México	GMEXICOB	9,324	Materials	Metals & Mining	Diversified Metals & Mining
Grupo Financiero Banorte, S.A.B. de C.V.	GFNORTEO	8,662	Financials	Banks	Diversified Banks
Organizacion Soriana, S.A.B. de C.V.	SORIANAB	7,546	Consumer Staples	Food & Staples Retailing	Hypermarkets & Super Centers
Alpek S.A.B. de C.V.	ALPEKA	6,472	Materials	Chemicals	Commodity Chemicals
Grupo Carso, S.A.B. de C.V.	GCARSOA1	6,195	Industrials	Industrial Conglomerates	Industrial Conglomerates
El Puerto de Liverpool, S.A.B. de C.V.	LIVEPOL1	6,093	Consumer Discretionary	Multiline Retail	Department Stores
Grupo Televisa, S.A.B. de C.V.	TLEVISACPO	6,025	Consumer Discretionary	Media	Broadcasting
Grupo Financiero Santander Mexico, S.A.B. de C.V.	SANMEXB	5,893	Financials	Banks	Diversified Banks
Mexichem, S.A.B. de C.V.	MEXCHEM*	5,583	Materials	Chemicals	Commodity Chemicals
Grupo Elektra S.A. de C.V.	ELEKTRA	5,571	Financials	Banks	Diversified Banks
Grupo Comercial Chedraui, S.A.B. de C.V.	CHDRAUIB	5,367	Consumer Staples	Food & Staples Retailing	Food Retail
Arca Continental, S.A.B. de C.V.	AC*	4,659	Consumer Staples	Beverages	Soft Drinks
Industrias Penoles, S.A.B. de C.V.	PE&OLES	4,629	Materials	Metals & Mining	Precious Metals & Minerals
Grupo Financiero Inbursa, S.A.B. de C.V.	GFINBURO	4,135	Financials	Banks	Diversified Banks
Gruma, S.A.B. de C.V.	GRUMAB	3,755	Consumer Staples	Food Products	Packaged Foods & Meats
Controladora Comercial Mexicana, S.A.B. de C.V.	LACOMERUBC	3,598	Consumer Staples	Food & Staples Retailing	Hypermarkets & Super Centers
Grupo Lala, S.A.B. de C.V.	LALAB	3,383	Consumer Staples	Food Products	Packaged Foods & Meats
Altos Hornos de Mexico, S.A.B. de C.V.	AHMSA*	3,300	Materials	Metals & Mining	Steel
Grupo Aeromexico, S.A.B. de C.V.	AEROMEX*	3,227	Industrials	Airlines	Airlines
Industrias Bachoco, S.A.B. de C.V.	BACHOCOB	3,142	Consumer Staples	Food Products	Packaged Foods & Meats
Grupo Sanborns, S.A.B. de C.V.	GSANBOB1	3,098	Consumer Discretionary	Multiline Retail	Department Stores
Empresas ICA, S.A.B. de C.V.	ICA	2,764	Industrials	Construction & Engineering	Construction & Engineering
Organizacion Cultiba, S.A.B. de C.V.	CULTIBAB	2,576	Consumer Staples	Beverages	Soft Drinks
Grupo Modelo, S.A.B. de C.V.	GMODELOC	2,491	Consumer Staples	Beverages	Brewers
Grupo Nacional Provincial, S.A.B. de C.V.	GNP	2,489	Financials	Insurance	Multi-line Insurance
Corporativo Fragua, S.A.B. de C.V.	FRAGUAB	2,409	Consumer Staples	Food & Staples Retailing	Drug Retail
Industrias CH, S.A.B. de C.V.	ICHB	2,364	Materials	Metals & Mining	Steel
Kimberly-Clark de Mexico, S.A.B. de C.V.	KIMBERA	2,189	Consumer Staples	Household Products	Household Products
Grupo Simec, S.A.B. de C.V.	SIMECB	2,027	Materials	Metals & Mining	Steel
Alsea SAB de CV	ALSEA	1,714	Consumer Discretionary	Hotels Restaurants & Leisure	Restaurants
Grupo Palacio de Hierro, S.A.B. de C.V.	GPH1	1,707	Consumer Discretionary	Multiline Retail	Department Stores
Vitro, S.A.B. de C.V.	VITROA	1,695	Materials	Containers & Packaging	Metal & Glass Containers
Grupo Gigante, S.A.B. de C.V.	GIGANTE	1,565	Consumer Staples	Food & Staples Retailing	Hypermarkets & Super Centers
Grupo Kuo, S.A.B. de C.V.	KUOB	1,410	Industrials	Industrial Conglomerates	Industrial Conglomerates
Grupo Casa Saba, S.A.B. de C.V.	SAB	1,393	Consumer Staples	Food & Staples Retailing	Drug Retail
OHL Mexico, S.A.B. de C.V.	OHLMEX	1,272	Industrials	Transportation Infrastructure	Highways & Railtracks
Qualitas Controladora, S.A.B. de C.V.	QCCPO	1,158	Financials	Insurance	Property & Casualty Insurance
Gentera, S.A.B. de C.V.	GENTERA	1,153	Financials	Consumer Finance	Consumer Finance
Grupo Industrial Maseca, S.A.B. de C.V.	MASECAB	1,134	Consumer Staples	Food Products	Packaged Foods & Meats
Grupo Famsa, S.A.B. de C.V.	GFAMSAA	1,117	Consumer Discretionary	Multiline Retail	Department Stores
Impulsora del Desarrollo y el Empleo en America Latina, S.A.B. de C.V.	IDEALB1	1,113	Industrials	Construction & Engineering	Construction & Engineering
Grupo Herdez, S.A.B. de C.V.	HERDEZ	1,077	Consumer Staples	Food Products	Packaged Foods & Meats
Controladora Vuela Compania de Aviación, S.A.B. de C.V.	VOLARA	1,056	Industrials	Airlines	Airlines
Grupo Financiero Interacciones, S.A. de C.V.	GFINTERO	1,049	Financials	Capital Markets	Diversified Capital Markets
TV Azteca, S.A.B. de C.V.	AZTECACP	968	Consumer Discretionary	Media	Broadcasting
Minera Frisco, S.A.B. de C.V.	MFRISCOA	932	Materials	Metals & Mining	Diversified Metals & Mining
Bio Pappel, S.A.B. de C.V.	PAPPEL	925	Materials	Containers & Packaging	Paper Packaging
Rassini, S.A.B. de C.V.	RASSINIA	895	Consumer Discretionary	Auto Components	Auto Parts & Equipment
Genomma Lab Internacional, S.A.B. de C.V.	LABB	868	Health Care	Pharmaceuticals	Pharmaceuticals
Megacable Holdings, S.A.B. de C.V.	MEGACPO	865	Consumer Discretionary	Media	Cable & Satellite
Farmacias Benavides, S.A.B. de C.V.	BEVIDESA	863	Consumer Staples	Food & Staples Retailing	Drug Retail
Infraestructura Energetica Nova, S.A.B. de C.V.	IENOVA	823	Utilities	Gas Utilities	Gas Utilities
Axtel, S.A.B. de C.V.	AXTELCPO	797	Telecommunication Services	Diversified Telecommunication	Integrated Telecom Services
Grupo Cementos Chihuahua, S.A.B. de C.V.	GCC	753	Materials	Construction Materials	Construction Materials
Grupo Industrial Saltillo, S.A.B. de C.V.	GISSAA	730	Industrials	Industrial Conglomerates	Industrial Conglomerates
Corporación Moctezuma, S.A.B. de C.V.	CMOCTEZ	691	Materials	Construction Materials	Construction Materials
Grupo Bafar, S.A.B. de C.V.	BAFARB	682	Consumer Staples	Food Products	Packaged Foods & Meats
Grupo Profuturo, S.A.B. de C.V.	GPROFUT	682	Financials	Insurance	Property & Casualty Insurance
Grupo Lamosa, S.A.B. de C.V.	LAMOSA	675	Industrials	Building Products	Building Products
Banregio Grupo Financiero, S.A.B. de C.V.	GFREGIO	658	Financials	Banks	Regional Banks
Empresas Cablevision, S.A.B. de C.V.	CABLECPO	658	Consumer Discretionary	Media	Cable & Satellite
Internacional de Ceramica, S.A.B. de C.V.	CERAMICB	542	Industrials	Building Products	Building Products
Promotora y Operadora de Infraestructura, S.A.B. de C.V.	PINFRA*	516	Industrials	Construction & Engineering	Construction & Engineering
Grupo Rotoplas, S.A.B. de C.V.	AGUA	493	Industrials	Machinery	Industrial Machinery
Corporación Interamericana de Entretenimiento, S.A.B. de C.V.	CIEB	478	Consumer Discretionary	Media	Movies & Entertainment
Inmuebles Carso, S.A.B. de C.V.	INCARSOB	468	Financials	Real Estate Management & Development	Diversified Real Estate Activities
Consorcio Ara, S.A.B. de C.V.	ARA	467	Consumer Discretionary	Household Durables	Homebuilding
Grupo Pochteca, S.A.B. de C.V.	POCHTECB	454	Industrials	Trading Companies & Distributors	Trading Companies & Distributors
Grupo Aeroportuario del Sureste, S.A.B. de C.V.	ASURB	442	Industrials	Transportation Infrastructure	Airport Services
Financiera Independencia, S.A.B. de C.V.	FINDEP	441	Financials	Consumer Finance	Consumer Finance
Grupo Posadas, S.A.B. de C.V.	POSADASA	440	Consumer Discretionary	Hotels Restaurants & Leisure	Hotels, Resorts & Cruise Lines
Grupo Minsa, S.A.B. de C.V.	MINSAB	417	Consumer Staples	Food Products	Packaged Foods & Meats
Grupo Aeroport del Pacifico, S.A.B. de C.V.	GAPB	417	Industrials	Transportation Infrastructure	Airport Services
Invex Controladora, S.A.B. de C.V.	INVEXA	412	Financials	Diversified Financial Services	Other Diversified Financial Services
Cydsa, S.A.B. de C.V.	CYDSASAA	408	Materials	Chemicals	Commodity Chemicals
Holding Monex, S.A.B. de C.V.	MONEXB	404	Financials	Consumer Finance	Consumer Finance
G Collado, S.A.B. de C.V.	COLLADO	401	Industrials	Trading Companies & Distributors	Trading Companies & Distributors
Unifin Financiera, S.A.P.I. de C.V.	UNIFINA	399	Financials	Diversified Financial Services	Other Diversified Financial Services
Corporacion Actinver, S.A.B. de C.V.	ACTINVRB	362	Financials	Capital Markets	Investment Banking & Brokerage
Grupo Financiero Multiva, S.A.B. de C.V.	GFMULTIO	349	Financials	Diversified Financial Services	Other Diversified Financial Services
Accel, S.A.B. de C.V.	ACCELSAB	338	Consumer Staples	Food Products	Packaged Foods & Meats
Compañía Minera Autlan, S.A.B. de C.V.	AUTLANB	337	Materials	Metals & Mining	Steel
Promotora Ambiental, S.A.B. de C.V.	PASAB	282	Industrials	Commercial Services & Supplies	Environmental & Facilities Services
Grupo Aeroportuario del Centro, S.A.B. de C.V.	OMAB	280	Industrials	Transportation Infrastructure	Airport Services
Corporativo GBM, S.A.B. de C.V.	GBMO	274	Financials	Capital Markets	Asset Management & Custody Banks
Pena Verde, S.A.B.	PV	268	Financials	Insurance	Multi-line Insurance
Credito Real, S.A.B. de C.V.	CREAL	252	Financials	Consumer Finance	Consumer Finance
Grupo TMM, S.A.B. de C.V.	TMMA	216	Energy	Oil, Gas & Consumable Fuels	Oil & Gas Storage & Transportation
Maxcom Telecomunicaciones, S.A.B. de C.V.	MAXCOMCP	202	Telecommunication Services	Diversified Telecommunication	Integrated Telecom Services
Grupo Vasconia, S.A.B. de C.V.	VASCONI	188	Consumer Discretionary	Household Durables	Housewares & Specialties
Macquarie Mexico Real Estate, S.A.B. de C.V.	FIBRAMQ	180	Financials	Real Estate Investment Trusts	Industrial REITs
Grupo Mexicano de desarrollo, S.A.B. de C.V.	GMD	175	Industrials	Construction & Engineering	Construction & Engineering
Corporacion Mexicana de Restaurantes S.A.B. de C.V.	CMRB	174	Consumer Discretionary	Hotels Restaurants & Leisure	Restaurants
Bolsa Mexicana de Valores, S.A.B. de C.V.	BOLSAA	168	Financials	Diversified Financial Services	Specialized Finance
Value Grupo Financiero, S.A.B. de C.V.	VALUEGFO	166	Financials	Capital Markets	Investment Banking & Brokerage
Medica Sur, S.A.B. de C.V.	MEDICAB	164	Health Care	Health Care Providers & Services	Health Care Facilities
PLA Administradora Industrial, S. de R.L. de C.V.	TERRA13	161	Financials	Real Estate Investment Trusts	Industrial REITs
Casa de Bolsa Finamex, S.A.B. de C.V.	FINAMEXO	153	Financials	Capital Markets	Investment Banking & Brokerage
Concentradora Fibra Danhos, S.A. de C.V.	DANHOS13	141	Financials	Real Estate Investment Trusts	Diversified REITs
General de Seguros, S.A.B. de C.V.	GENSEG	131	Financials	Insurance	Multi-line Insurance
Concentradora Fibra Hotelera Mexicana S.A. de C.V.	FIHO12	124	Financials	Real Estate Investment Trusts	Hotel & Resort REITs
Grupe, S.A.B. de C.V.	CIDMEGA	120	Consumer Discretionary	Hotels Restaurants & Leisure	Hotels, Resorts & Cruise Lines
Hoteles City Express, S.A.B. de C.V.	HCITY	106	Consumer Discretionary	Hotels Restaurants & Leisure	Hotels, Resorts & Cruise Lines
Prologis Property Mexico, S.A. de C.V.	FIBRAPL	93	Financials	Real Estate Investment Trusts	Industrial REITs
Consorcio Aristos, S.A.B. de C.V.	ARISTOSA	89	Industrials	Construction & Engineering	Construction & Engineering
Grupo Sports World, S.A.B. de C.V.	SPORTS	80	Consumer Discretionary	Hotels Restaurants & Leisure	Leisure Facilities
Dine, S.A.B. de C.V.	DINEB	77	Financials	Real Estate Management & Development	Real Estate Development
Convertidora Industrial, S.A.B. de C.V.	CONVERA	77	Materials	Containers & Packaging	Paper Packaging
Corporación Inmobiliaria Vesta, S.A.B. de C.V.	VESTA	75	Financials	Real Estate Management & Development	Real Estate Development
Grupo Radio Centro, S.A.B. de C.V.	RCENTROA	74	Consumer Discretionary	Media	Broadcasting
Asesor de Activos Prisma S.A.P.I.	FINN13	66	Financials	Real Estate Investment Trusts	Hotel & Resort REITs
Consorcio Hogar, S.A.B. de C.V.	HOGARB	60	Consumer Discretionary	Household Durables	Homebuilding
Grupo Hotelero Santa Fe, S.A.B. de C.V.	HOTEL	54	Consumer Discretionary	Hotels Restaurants & Leisure	Hotels, Resorts & Cruise Lines
Fibra Shop Portafolios Inmobiliarios S.A.P.I. de C.V.	FSHOP13	48	Financials	Real Estate Investment Trusts	Retail REITs
Proteak Uno, S.A.B. de C.V.	TEAKCPO	32	Materials	Paper & Forest Products	Forest Products
Hilasal Mexicana, S.A.B. de C.V.	HILASALA	25	Consumer Discretionary	Textiles, Apparel & Luxury Goods	Textiles
La Latinoamericana, Seguros, S.A.	LASEG	20	Financials	Insurance	Multi-line Insurance
Sare Holding, S.A.B. de C.V.	SAREB	5	Consumer Discretionary	Household Durables	Homebuilding
Fibra MTY, S.A.P.I. de C.V.	FMTY14	1	Financials	Real Estate Investment Trusts	Office REITs
Ingeal, S.A.B. de C.V.	INGEALB	1	Consumer Staples	Food Products	Packaged Foods & Meats
Edoardos Martin, S.A.B. de C.V.	EDOARDOB	-	Consumer Discretionary	Textiles, Apparel & Luxury Goods	Apparel, Accessories & Luxury
Concentradora Hipotecaria, S.A.B. de C.V.	FHIPO	-	Financials	Real Estate Investment Trusts	Office REITs
Corporacion Geo, S.A.B. de C.V.	GEOB	-	Consumer Discretionary	Household Durables	Homebuilding
Grupo Comercial Gomo, S.A.B. de C.V.	GOMO	-	Industrials	Trading Companies & Distributors	Trading Companies & Distributors
Desarrolladora Homex, S.A.B. de C.V.	HOMEX	-	Consumer Discretionary	Household Durables	Homebuilding
Red de Carreteras de Occidente, S.A.B. de C.V	RCOA	-	Industrials	Transportation Infrastructure	Highways & Railtracks
Urbi desarrollos Urbanos, S.A.B. de C.V.	URBI	-	Consumer Discretionary	Household Durables	Homebuilding

== See also ==
- List of companies of Mexico
- Economy of Mexico
- Mexican Stock Exchange
- Indice de Precios y Cotizaciones (México)
- Small and medium enterprises in Mexico
