= Arch of Cabo San Lucas =

Natural arch in Mexico

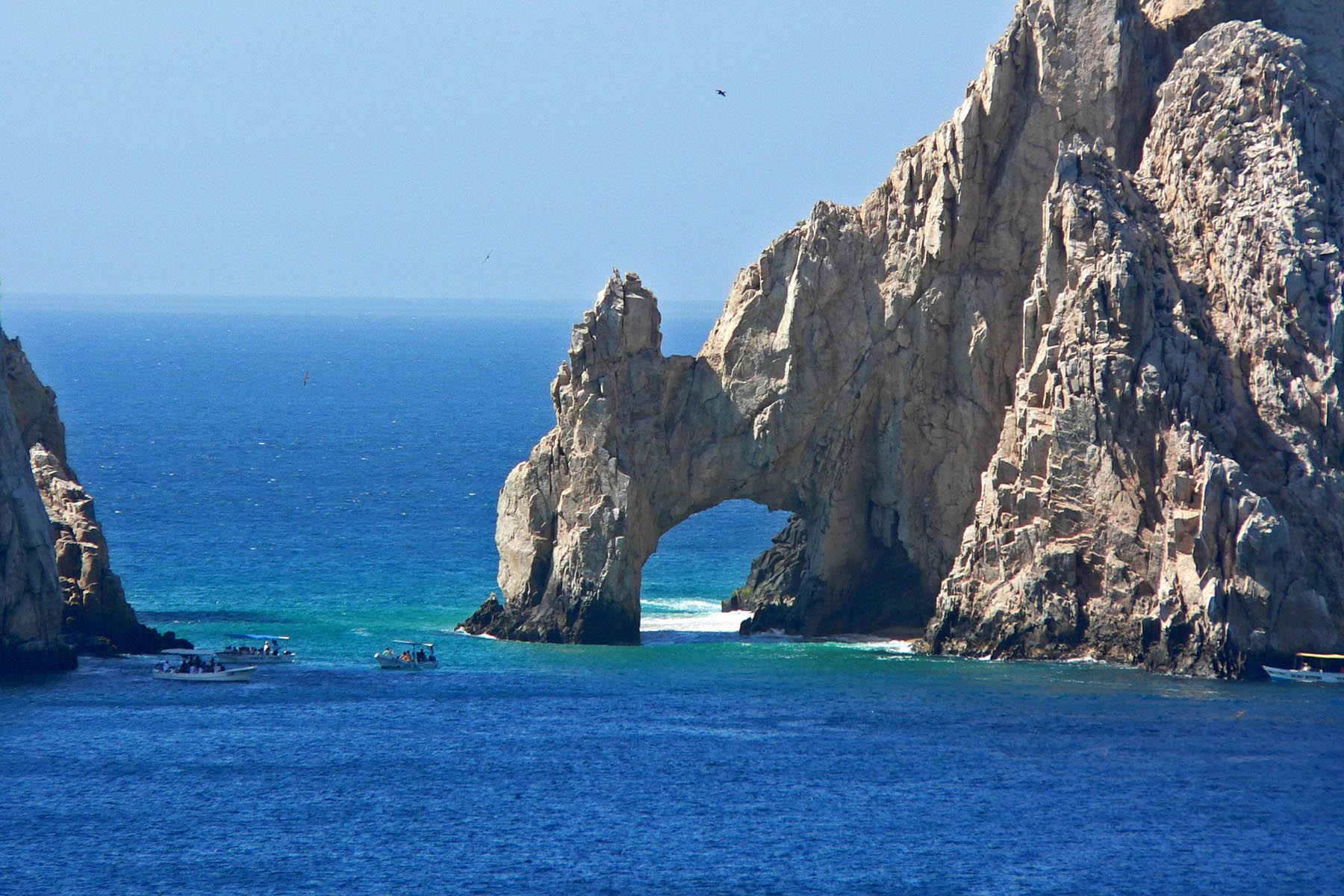

- Location within Baja California Sur
- Location: Cabo San Lucas, Mexico
- Nearest city: Cabo San Lucas
- Coordinates: 22.8760°N 109.8947°W
- Elevation: 200 ft (61 m)

The arch of Cabo San Lucas is a distinctive granitic rock formation at the southern tip of Cabo San Lucas, which is itself the extreme southern end of Mexico's Baja California Peninsula. The arch is locally known as "El Arco," which means "the arch" in Spanish, or "Land's End." It is here that the Pacific Ocean becomes the Gulf of California.

This area is widely used in hotel advertising in the Los Cabos Corridor. This spot is a popular gathering area for sea lions and is frequented by tourists. The Arch of Cabo San Lucas is adjacent to Lovers Beach on the Sea of Cortez side and Divorce Beach on the rougher Pacific Ocean side.

== Access ==
The Arch is accessible by land or boat from the beach of the last hotel on the Pacific. Access to the arch requires climbing large rocks. Entering the arch in a small watercraft can be somewhat dangerous when the sea is running. The water level can significantly go up and down. Being close to the sides of the arch is not recommended.

== Geology ==
Basement rock in Los Cabos formed through intrusive igneous processes c. 115 million years ago, during the Cretaceous period. The arch is three stories tall and was formed from natural erosion.
