= Colegio El Camino =

Private school in Mexico

Location
- Cabo San Lucas; Mexico
- Coordinates: 22.88317°N 109.91978°W

Information
- Type: Private school
- Website: elcamino.edu.mx

Colegio El Camino Los Cabos, BCS is a bilingual, non-profit, non sectarian private school located at the base of Pedregal Cabo San Lucas in Los Cabos, Baja California Sur, Mexico. The headmaster for the school is Mr. Heath Sparrow.

It is an International Baccalaureate (IB) accredited K-12 private school and is one of 41 Mexican schools associated with Cognia.
