= Cabo San Lucas =

Cabo San Lucas Yenecamú
- City
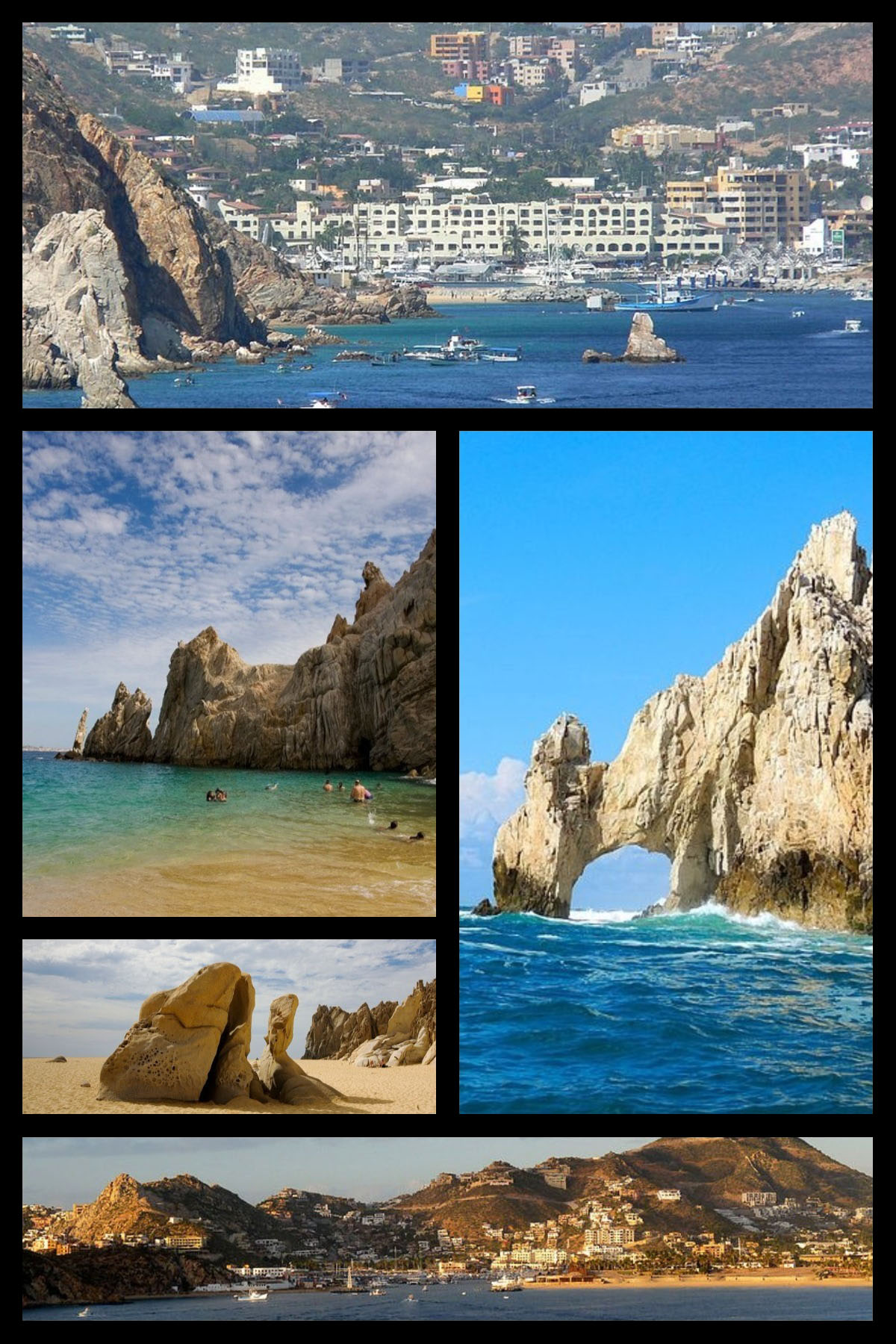
- Above, from left to right: Cabo San Lucas Bay, rock formation, Arcos de Cabo San Lucas, Beach and Panoramic.

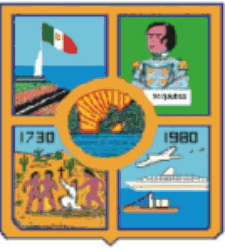
- Coat of arms
- Nickname: Cabo
- Location in Baja California Sur Cabo San Lucas (Mexico)
- Coordinates: 22°53′41″N 109°54′55″W
- Country: Mexico
- State: Baja California Sur
- Municipality: Los Cabos
- Established: 1537

Area
  - City: 48.11 km^{2} (18.58 sq mi)
- Elevation: 10 m (33 ft)

Population (2020 census)
  - City: 202,694
  - Density: 4,213/km^{2} (10,910/sq mi)
  - Metro: 351,111
- Demonym: Sanluqueño
- Time zone: UTC−07:00 (Zona Pacífico)
- Postal code: 23450-23478
- Area code: 624
- Website: loscabos.gob.mx

Cabo San Lucas (Spanish pronunciation: [ˈkaβo san ˈlukas], 'Saint Luke Cape'), also known simply as Cabo, is a resort city on the southern tip of the Baja California peninsula, in the Mexican state of Baja California Sur. As of the 2020 Census, the population of the city was 202,694. Cabo San Lucas and the neighboring San José del Cabo are collectively known as Los Cabos. Together, they form a metropolitan area of 351,111 inhabitants.

Rated as one of Mexico's top tourist destinations, Cabo San Lucas is known for its beaches, scuba diving locations, Balnearios, the sea arch El Arco de Cabo San Lucas, and marine life. The Los Cabos Corridor has become a heavily trafficked vacation destination for tourists, with numerous resorts and timeshares along the coast between Cabo San Lucas and San José del Cabo.

The waters around Cabo are home to a variety of marine wildlife including rays, sharks, mahi-mahi (dorado), and striped marlin.

== History ==
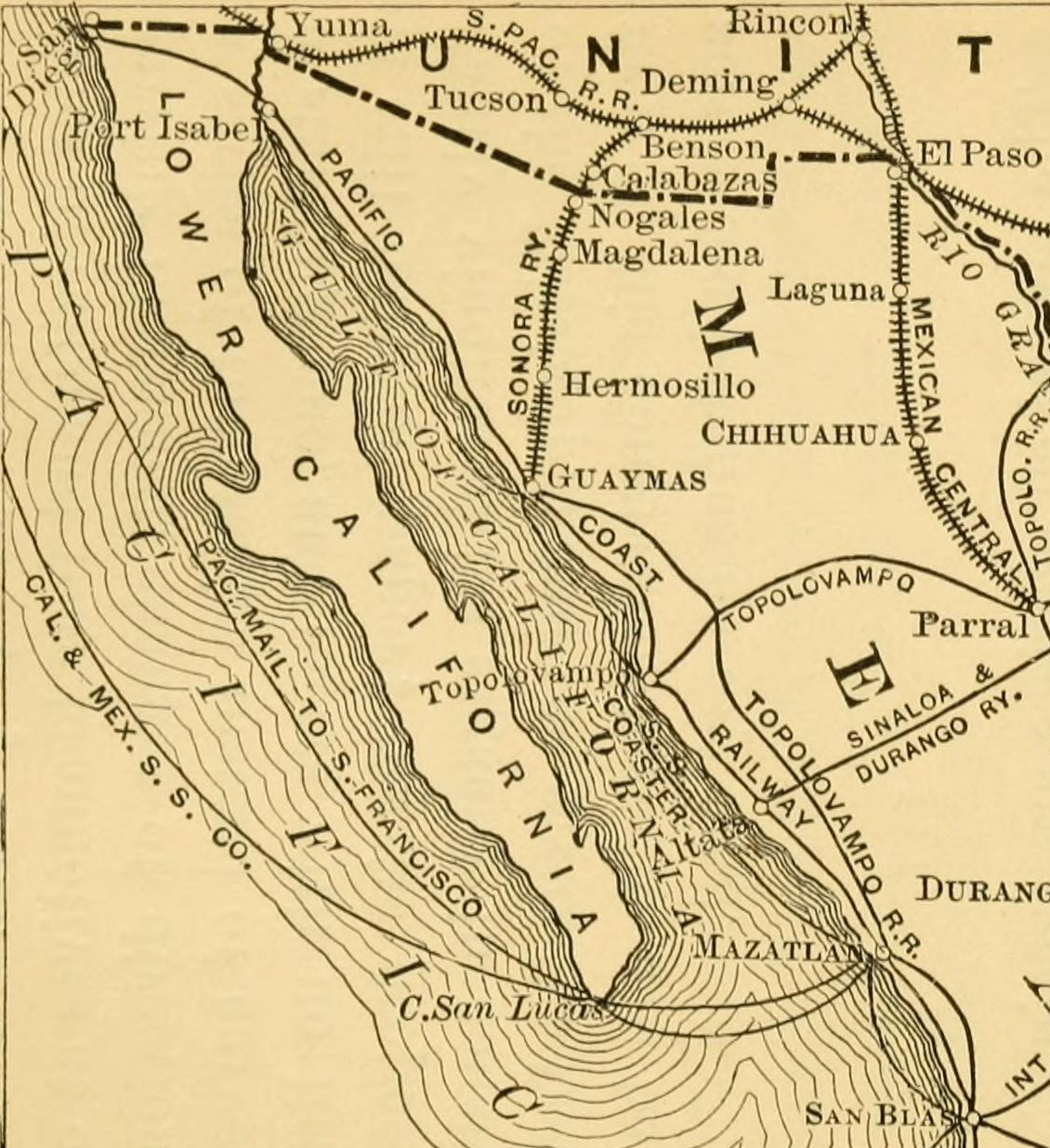
Cabo San Lucas was on several steamship lines in the 1880s.

Archaeological excavations have shown evidence of continual human habitation in the area for at least 10,000 years. When the first Europeans arrived, they encountered the Pericú people, who survived on a subsistence diet based on hunting and gathering seeds, roots, shellfish, and other marine resources. They called the location Yenecamú.

According to the narrative of Hatsutaro, a Japanese castaway, in the book Kaigai Ibun (written by Maekawa, Junzo, and Bunzo Sakai and narrated by Hatsutaro), when he arrived at Cabo San Lucas in May 1842, there were only two houses and about 20 inhabitants. However, American authors such as Henry Edwards and John Ross Browne claim that Cabo San Lucas's founder was an Englishman named Thomas "Old Tom" Ritchie. John Ross Browne says Ritchie arrived there about 1828, while Edwards says that he died in October 1874. The actual founder of Cabo San Lucas was Cipriano Ceseña in 1788 who arrived from Hermosillo, Sonora. Per The book by Pablo L. Martinez, Guia Familiar de Baja California, 1700–1900.

A fishing village began growing in the area. In 1917, an American company built a floating platform to catch tuna, and ten years later founded Compañía de Productos Marinos S.A. The plant operated for several years.

== Tourism ==
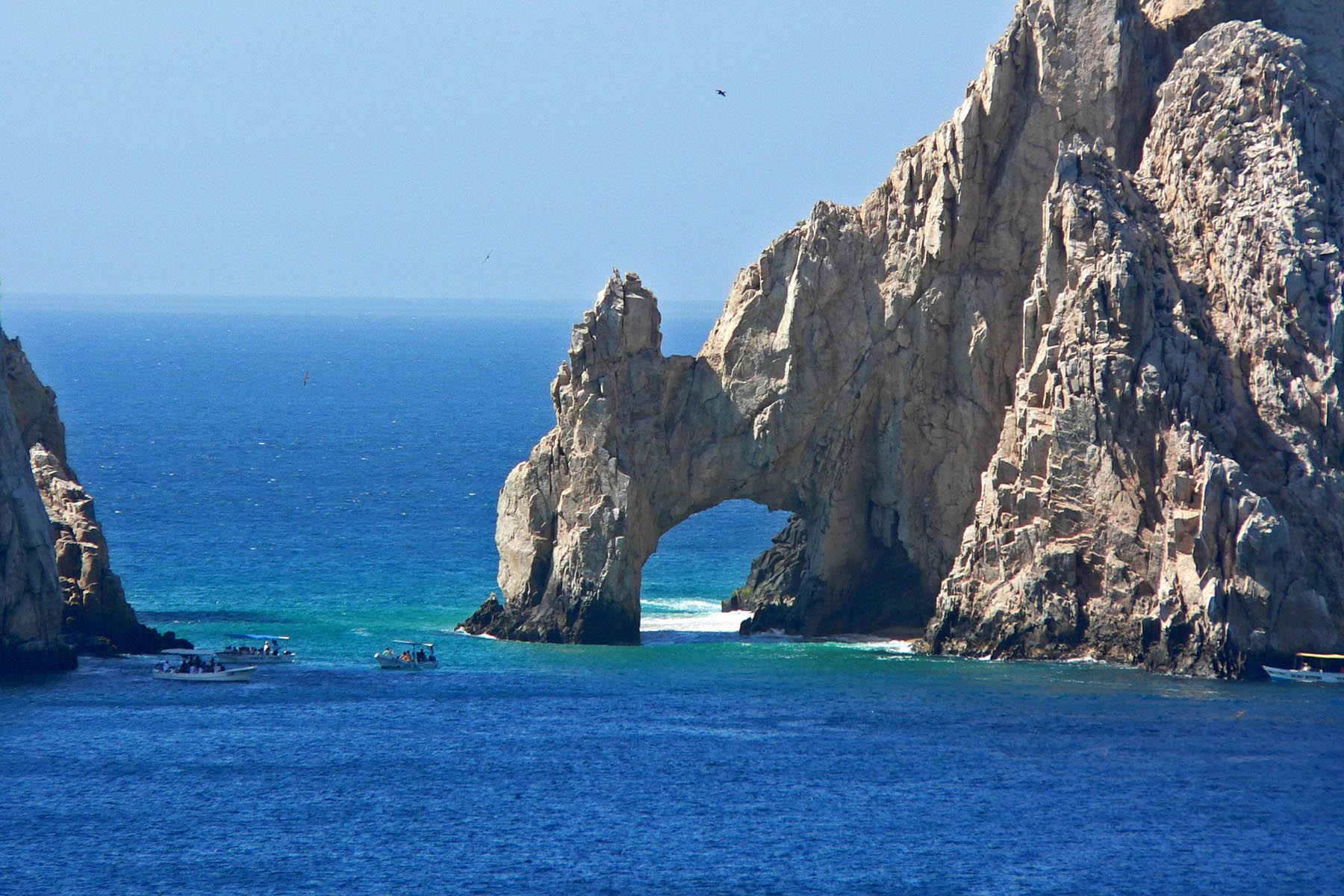
El Arco de Cabo San Lucas

Cabo San Lucas has become a prominent vacation and spa destination, with a variety of sites of interest and timeshares that have been built on the coast between San Lucas and San José del Cabo. The distinctive Arco de Cabo San Lucas at Lands End is a local landmark. The city also has a natural history museum, the Museo de Historia Natural de Cabo San Lucas.

Cabo San Lucas has the highest-paying marlin tournament in the world, the Bisbee's Los Cabos Offshore. This tournament takes place every year in the month of October.

In the winter, pods of whales can be observed in the area. They bear their calves in the warm waters of the Gulf of California after traveling up to 10,000 kilometres (6,000 mi) from Alaska and Siberia.

=== Development ===
The beaches, surfing, and sport fishing opportunities in Cabo San Lucas have attracted a great number of Mexican natives and foreigners to spend their vacations in large-scale tourist developments. The development of Cabo's tourism industry was prompted by the Mexican government's development of infrastructure to turn Cabo San Lucas into a major centre for tourism in Mexico, beginning in 1974. Upon completion of the Transpeninsular Highway, also known as the Mexican Federal Highway 1, tourist developments in Los Cabos proceeded relatively unchecked.

Until the 1970s, the unique and fragile environment of this part of Mexico was largely unprotected by law, and therefore was subjected to developers acting in concert with government agencies interested only in low-end tourist bonanzas. There is, however, a growing collection of activists and attorneys now involved in preserving many of Baja's desert habitats, marine mammals, and stretches of coastline. A number of agencies, including the Gulf of California Conservation Fund and the Centre for Environmental Law in La Paz, are challenging the destruction of wetlands and other ecosystems from Los Cabos to Ensenada. In the face of a growing international public demand for corporate-driven ecological stewardship, higher-end resorts in the Los Cabos area are increasingly sensitive to their environmental impact and are taking initial steps to institute sustainable practices such as reducing water usage and non-recyclable trash output. In 2017, Los Cabos was projected to be one of the leaders in travel in Latin America, many of the developments owed to its increased accessibility with added plane routes from the US and Canada. It is expected that by 2018, 4,000 new sleeping rooms will come online in Cabo, and the increase in tourism will contribute to its growth as a leader in leisure.

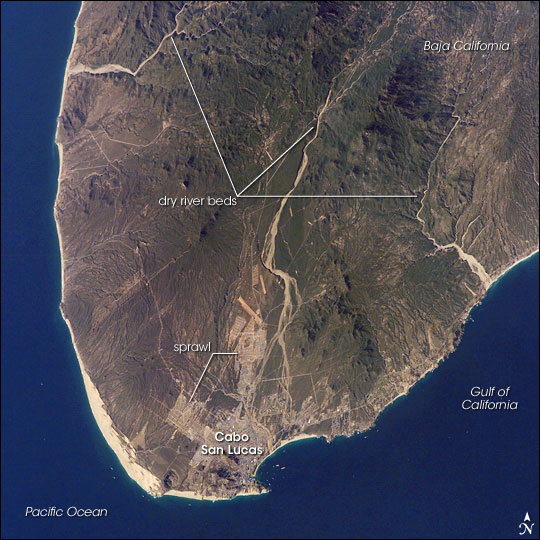
This view of Cabo San Lucas shows the rapid growth of the area (2005).

=== Transportation ===
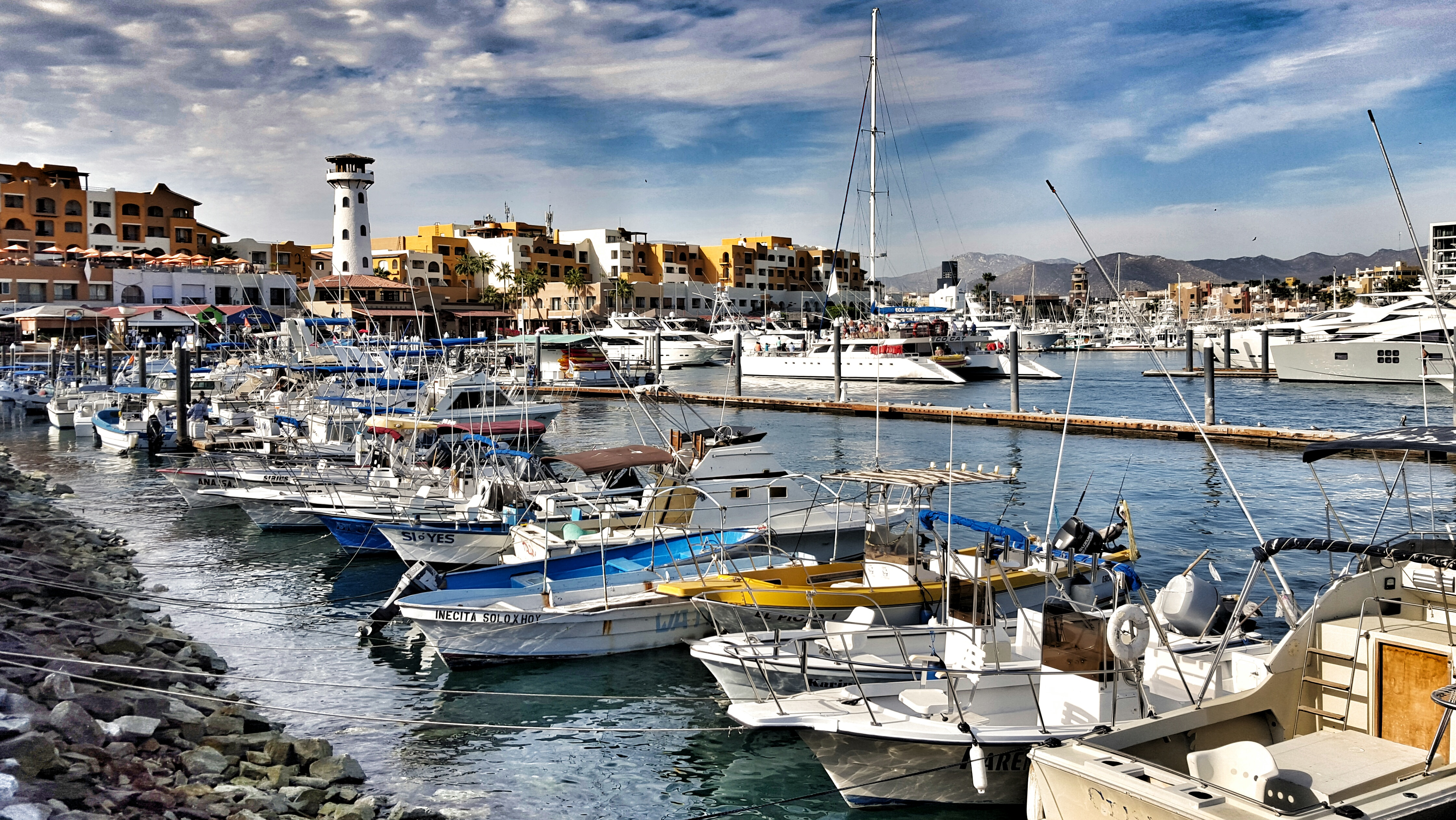
A sizable marina dominates the port of Cabo San Lucas.

Cabo San Lucas and San José del Cabo are served by Los Cabos International Airport. In 2022, Los Cabos Airport received more than 3.3 million visitors – a more than 20% projected growth when compared to 2021 and a 32% compounded growth over the last five years with 800 thousand more passengers than 2017.

The town is also a popular port of call for many cruise ships. Cabo San Lucas has a small international airfield, which handles air traffic for general aviation flights and air taxi services.

Many tourists get around the area through the numerous local taxis that service the primary parts of Cabo, as well as the corridor and the airport. Another alternative is the bus system which is less expensive than taxis. It costs several pesos and it is mainly used by locals but also available to tourists. As of 2021, Uber is available as a means of transportation in the Los Cabos area.

=== Nightlife and activities ===
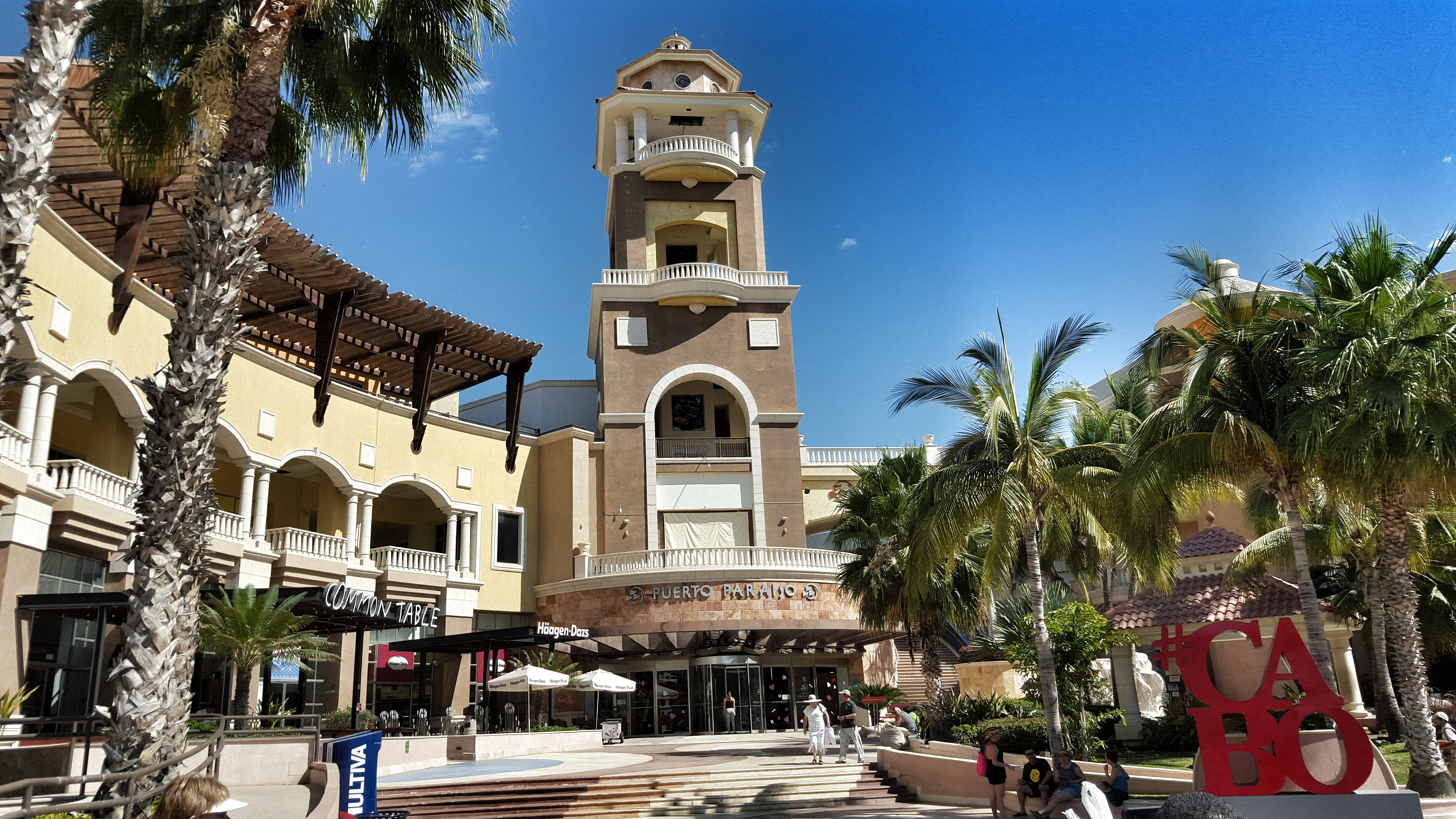
Puerto Paraíso, in the very center of Cabo San Lucas

Clubs in Cabo include the Cabo Wabo Cantina, a nightclub owned by rock singer Sammy Hagar, founded originally by him with other members of Van Halen, named after their hit single "Cabo Wabo". There is also the Baja Brewing Company. The English-language newspaper for Cabo San Lucas, the biweekly Gringo Gazette, has news on tourist activities in Cabo San Lucas, San Jose, Todos Santos, La Paz, and the East Cape Baja. Puerto Paraíso, a mall in downtown Cabo San Lucas, has a bowling alley and a movie theater.

=== Resort corridor ===
Chileno Bay is one of the most frequented beaches in the Corridor. It is home to tropical fish, sea turtles, invertebrates, and sponges. Snorkelers often visit this beach to observe underwater sea life.

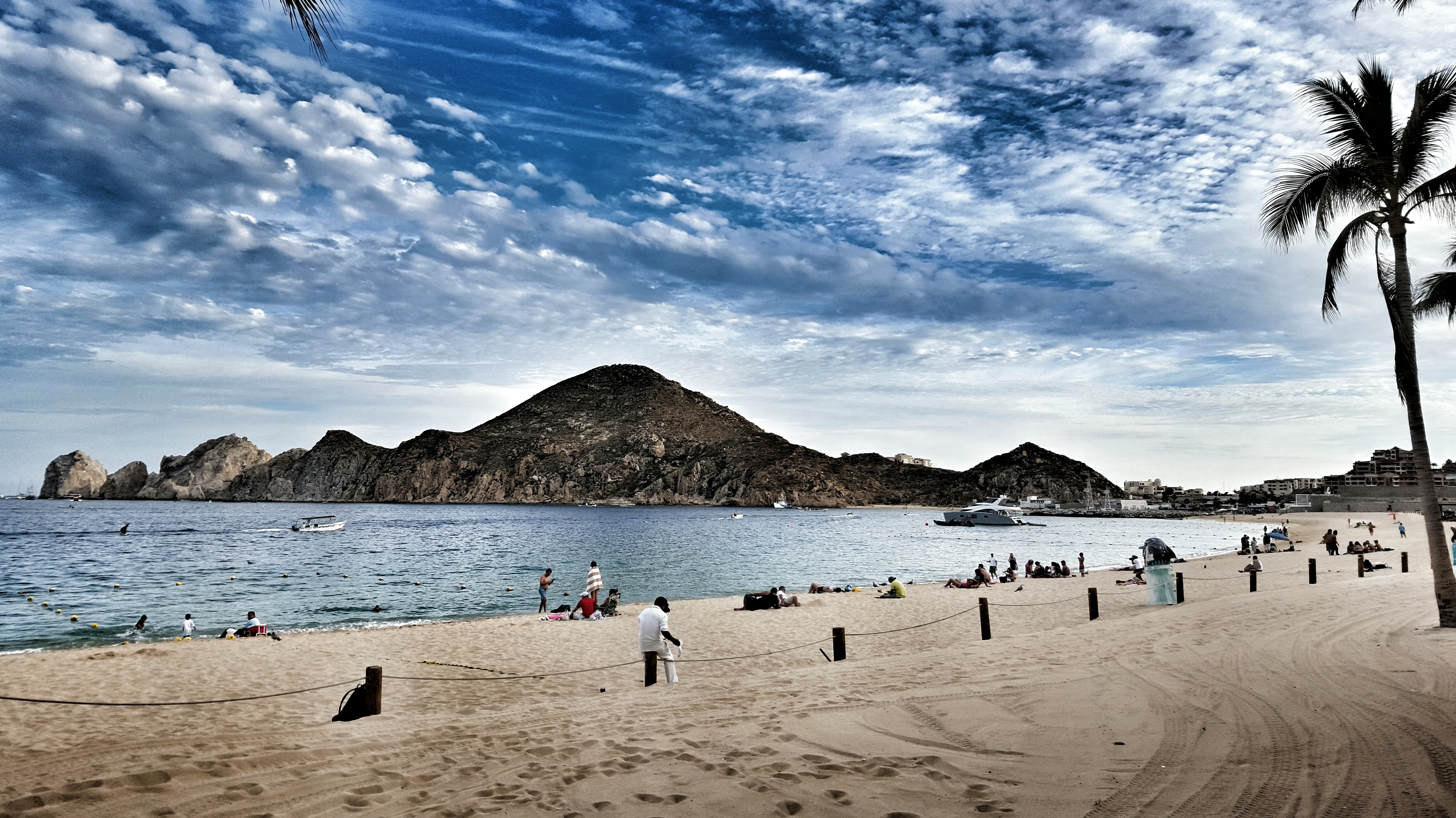
Medano is the main beach of Cabo San Lucas, pictured here with Land's End in the background.

== Climate ==
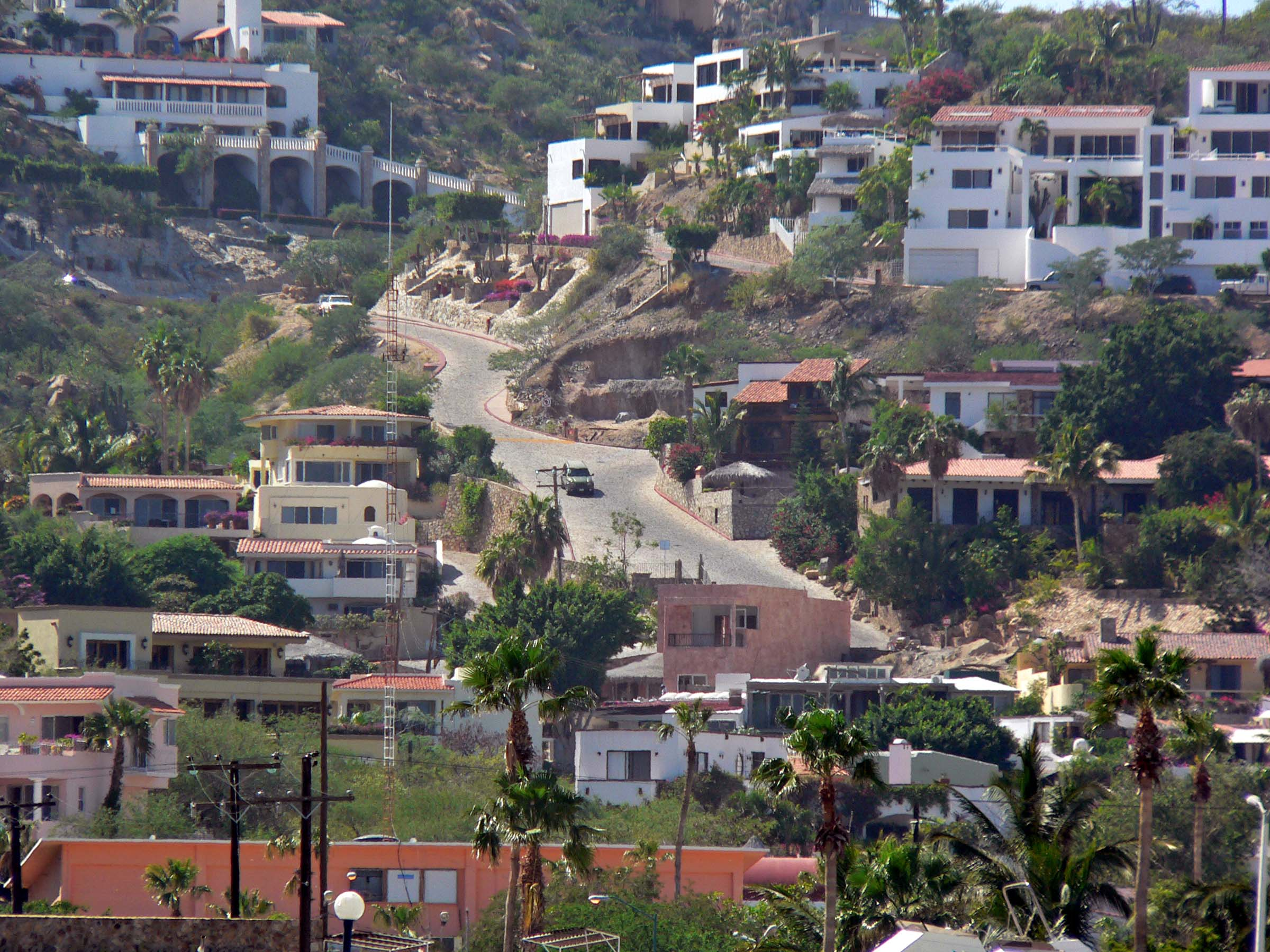
Suburb in Cabo San Lucas with terrain illustrating the mixture of the state's common environments: semi-arid desert, mountains, and coastal plains

Like the rest of the extreme south of Baja California, Cabo San Lucas has a hot desert climate (Köppen: BWh).

During summer, Cabo San Lucas is cooler than San José del Cabo by about 1.5 to 3 °C (2.7 to 5.4 °F). Sometimes during the summer, when winds blow from the Pacific Ocean instead of the Gulf of California, the differences in temperatures between San José del Cabo and Cabo San Lucas are higher.

Cabo San Lucas is less rainy than San José del Cabo, although hurricanes can bring heavy rain for long periods. Hurricane Odile made landfall at Cabo San Lucas on 14 September 2014, and caused widespread damage. Due to the position of the city and orography, local summer thunderstorms do not get near enough to bring rain to the town.

The sea temperature experiences lows of 21–22 °C (70–72 °F) in winter, and highs of 28–29 °C (82–84 °F) during the summer months.

Climate data for Cabo San Lucas, 1991–2020 normals, extremes 1937–2020
Month	Jan	Feb	Mar	Apr	May	Jun	Jul	Aug	Sep	Oct	Nov	Dec	Year
Record high °C (°F)	37.0 (98.6)	37.0 (98.6)	37.0 (98.6)	41.0 (105.8)	40.0 (104.0)	42.0 (107.6)	41.0 (105.8)	44.0 (111.2)	44.0 (111.2)	41.0 (105.8)	38.0 (100.4)	37.0 (98.6)	44.0 (111.2)
Mean daily maximum °C (°F)	26.6 (79.9)	27.1 (80.8)	28.5 (83.3)	30.1 (86.2)	32.1 (89.8)	32.6 (90.7)	34.4 (93.9)	34.7 (94.5)	33.7 (92.7)	33.4 (92.1)	30.4 (86.7)	27.4 (81.3)	30.9 (87.6)
Daily mean °C (°F)	19.7 (67.5)	20.0 (68.0)	21.2 (70.2)	22.7 (72.9)	24.3 (75.7)	25.5 (77.9)	28.4 (83.1)	29.3 (84.7)	28.5 (83.3)	27.3 (81.1)	23.9 (75.0)	20.7 (69.3)	24.3 (75.7)
Mean daily minimum °C (°F)	12.8 (55.0)	12.9 (55.2)	13.9 (57.0)	15.4 (59.7)	16.5 (61.7)	18.5 (65.3)	22.4 (72.3)	23.8 (74.8)	23.3 (73.9)	21.2 (70.2)	17.5 (63.5)	14.0 (57.2)	17.7 (63.9)
Record low °C (°F)	4.5 (40.1)	3.0 (37.4)	6.0 (42.8)	7.0 (44.6)	6.5 (43.7)	10.0 (50.0)	10.0 (50.0)	10.0 (50.0)	10.0 (50.0)	10.0 (50.0)	8.0 (46.4)	5.0 (41.0)	3.0 (37.4)
Average precipitation mm (inches)	6.0 (0.24)	4.7 (0.19)	1.4 (0.06)	0.0 (0.0)	0.1 (0.00)	0.4 (0.02)	7.8 (0.31)	85.1 (3.35)	110.0 (4.33)	25.3 (1.00)	16.9 (0.67)	7.3 (0.29)	265.0 (10.43)
Average rainy days	0.9	0.6	0.3	0.0	0.1	0.1	1.0	3.6	4.0	1.4	1.1	0.8	13.9
Source: Servicio Meteorologico Nacional

Average Sea Temperature
Jan	Feb	Mar	Apr	May	Jun	Jul	Aug	Sep	Oct	Nov	Dec
22.4 °C 72.4 °F	21.5 °C 70.7 °F	21.5 °C 70.6 °F	21.5 °C 70.7 °F	23.5 °C 74.3 °F	23.1 °C 73.5 °F	25.7 °C 78.2 °F	28.5 °C 83.2 °F	29.5 °C 85 °F	29 °C 84.1 °F	26.8 °C 80.2 °F	24 °C 75.3 °F

== Population ==
Historical population
Year	Pop.	±%
1990	16,059	—
1995	28,483	+77.4%
2000	37,984	+33.4%
2005	56,811	+49.6%
2010	68,464	+20.5%
2015	81,111	+18.5%
2020	202,694	+149.9%

As of 2020, the population was 202,694 and has experienced very rapid growth and development. It is the third-largest city in Baja California Sur after La Paz and San José del Cabo.

The majority of non-Mexican inhabitants in the community originate from the United States, and along with residents from San José del Cabo they account for 80% of the U.S. population in the state.

== Education ==
Secondary

- Moises Saenz Garza Downtown Los Cabos, public school
- Liceo Los Cabos , formerly known as Colegio Papalotl. Complex of multiple education levels
- Colegio Amaranto, a private school in Cabo San Lucas
- Colegio El Camino, IB accredited K–12 private school, in Pedregal, Cabo San Lucas

High schools

- CETMAR N°31 Public High School, Multiple ocean education branches.
- Cobach N°04 Public High School, Technic education.

University

- Instituto de Estudios Superiores de Los Cabos, a campus of the National Technological Institute of Mexico
- UABCS Los Cabos, a branch campus of the public Universidad Autónoma de Baja California Sur

== See also ==
- Los Cabos International Airport
- Mexican Federal Highway 1 - from the border until here
- Mexican Federal Highway 19
- Sebastián Vizcaíno
