= Minera Autlan =

Mexican mining company

Compañia Minera Autlan, S.A.B. de C.V.
- Company type: Public
- Traded as: BMV: AUTLAN B
- Industry: Mining
- Founded: October 5, 1953
- Headquarters: San Pedro Garza García, Mexico
- Key people: Jose Antonio Rivero Larrea, (Chairman); Oscar Maldonado, (CEO)
- Products: Manganese, Ferroalloys
- Revenue: ▼MX$ 4,220.4 million (2015)
- Net income: ▲MX$ 60.1 million (2015)
- Number of employees: 1,700
- Website: www.autlan.com.mx

Minera Autlan is a mining company and the largest producer of ferroalloys in Mexico.

== See also ==
- List of companies traded on the Bolsa Mexicana de Valores
- List of Mexican companies
- Economy of Mexico
