= Museum of Natural History in Cabo San Lucas =

Museum in Cabo San Lucas, Mexico

- Museo de Historia Natural de Cabo San Lucas (Spanish)
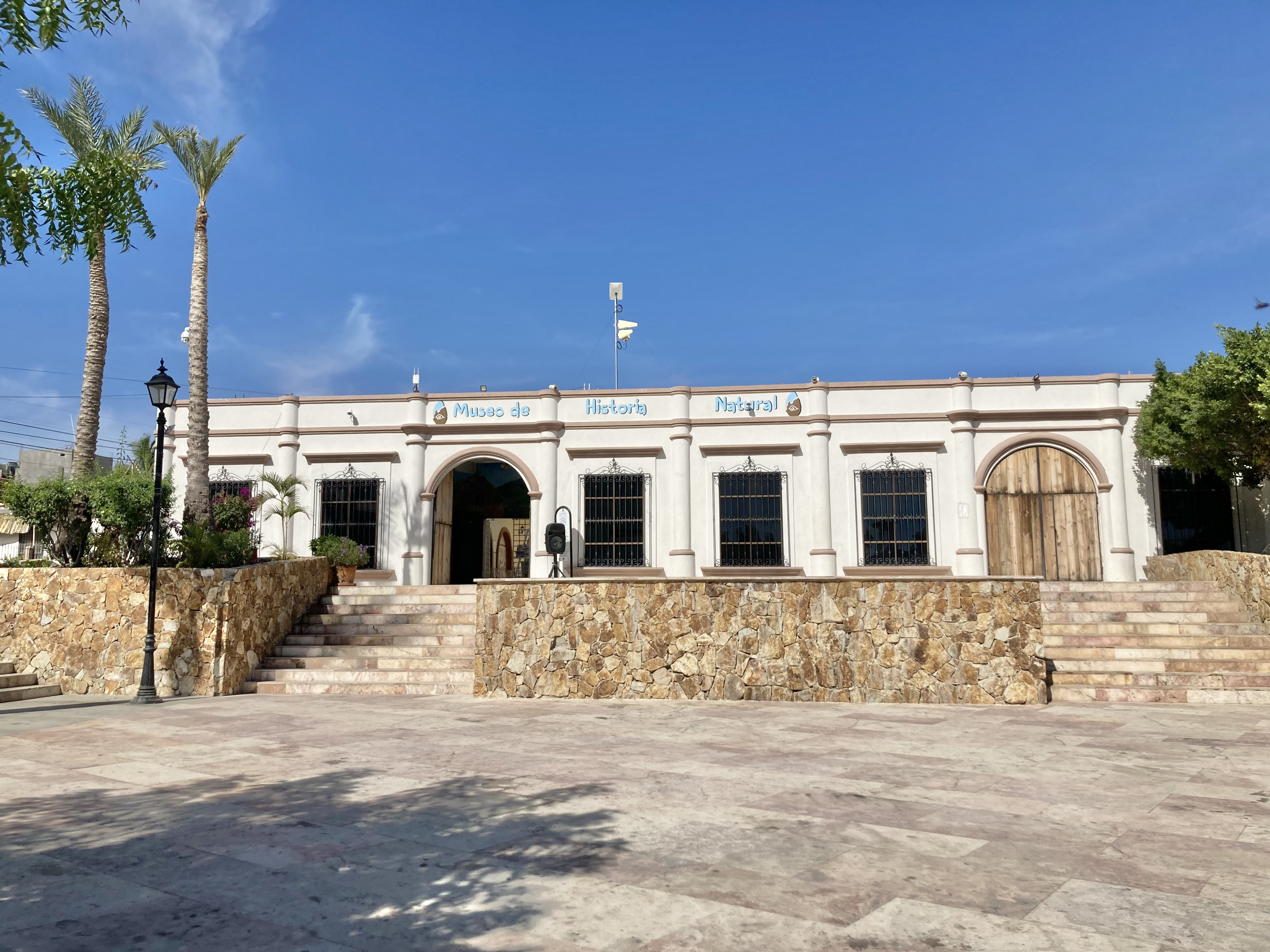
- The museum in 2024

- Location within Baja California Sur Location within Mexico
- Established: 9 October 2006
- Location: Plaza Amelia Wilkes, Centro, 23410 Cabo San Lucas, B.C.S., Mexico
- Coordinates: 22.8829°N 109.9146°W
- Type: Natural history
- Visitors: 1,000 monthly (2019)
- Director: Roberto Cuétara González

The Museum of Natural History in Cabo San Lucas (Spanish: Museo de Historia Natural de Cabo San Lucas), also known as the Museum of the Californias (Museo de las Californias), is a natural history museum in Cabo San Lucas, Baja California Sur. Established in 2006 and located in the city's center, it offers exhibits on the history of Cabo and skeletons of native animals.

== History ==
The museum first opened on 9 October 2006. The building it is in was previously the first elementary school in the city, called Article 123 of the United Nations (Artículo 123 Naciones Unidas) and it was built in 1952. The museum was originally a project run by professors at the Autonomous University of Baja California Sur, but the current curator and director, Roberto Cuétara González, took over in 2007. He viewed it as a continuation of the Old Museum of the Californias that was previously housed in the schoolbuilding. The museum has been consistently neglected, however, and, its director, Roberto Cuétara González, has had to put his own money into keeping the museum open. The museum's facade was renovated in 2019.

== Exhibits ==
The museum has exhibits that cover paleobotany, anthropology, astronomy, marine biodiversity, and geology. It also showcases skeletons of marine mammals, birds, and reptiles native to the area. The museum also provides information about the history of Cabo and contains a skeleton of a Pericú, one of the native peoples of the peninsula. In 2023, it acquired Cochimí artifacts. The whale skeleton displayed in the plaza in front of the museum is a common target of theft and vandalism.
