= Fibra Shop =

- Company type: FIBRA (investment trust vehicle)
- Industry: Shopping centers
- Headquarters: Juan Salvador Agraz 65, Contadero, Cuajimalpa de Morelos, Mexico City, Mexico
- Number of locations: 18 shopping centers (2023)
- Area served: Mexico
- Key people: Salvador Cayón Ceballos (CEO)
- Revenue: 1,663,320,000 MXN (2022)
- Net income: 1,291,870,000 MXN (2022)
- Total assets: 26,729,000,000 MXN (Q3 2023)
- Website: https://fibrashop.mx

Fibra Shop (Mexico City stock exchange: FSHOP13) is a Mexican FIBRA (real estate holding company) operating shopping centers across Mexico, including fashion malls, power centers, and community shopping centers. The properties managed are:

Fibra Shop-managed fashion malls
Name	City	State	Area m2		Expansion area	Leasable area		No. of tenants	Year opened	Original developer	Visitors per year	Anchors
Name	City	State	land	built	Expansion area	managed	owned	No. of tenants	Year opened	Original developer	Visitors per year	Anchors
La Perla	Zapopan (Greater Guadalajara)	Jal.	64,073	350,000	Fase 2 = 28,790	128,048	98,048	236	2021	Grupo Ouest		Liverpool, Cinépolis
Puerta La Victoria	Querétaro	Qro.	41,255	179,092	NA	59,808	59,808	101	2017	Abilia	4,346,724	Sears, Fiesta Inn, H&M, Forever 21, Cinépolis
Puerto Paraíso	Cabo San Lucas	B.C.S.	48,588	117,347	NA	36,033	29,007	133	2002	Grupo Frel	6,633,764	Cinemex, Casino, Forever 21, Innovasport
Plaza Cibeles	Irapuato (Greater León)	Gto.	126,518	116,821	n/a	76,134	76,134	164	2002	Grupo CACEBA	11,500,350	Liverpool, Sears, Cinépolis, Soriana
Las Misiones	Ciudad Juárez	Chih.	172,770	85,547	NA	57,097	38,491	123	2004	Grupo Roma	8,541,534	Liverpool, Sears, Cinépolis
Galerías Mall Sonora	Hermosillo	Sonora	145,619	85,400	9,719	59,570	59,570	169	2010	KIMCO	6,829,736	Liverpool, Sears, Cinépolis, Casino
Sentura	Zamora	Michoacán.	NA	NA	NA	NA	NA	NA	2016	Grupo CACEBA	NA	Liverpool, Cinépolis, Suburbia
Plaza La Luciérnaga	San Miguel de Allende	Gto.	97,842	31,964	NA	28,668	19,936	77	2007	Grupo CACEBA	5,676,006	Liverpool, Soriana, Cinemex
