= Baja Brewing Company =

Mexican craft brewery

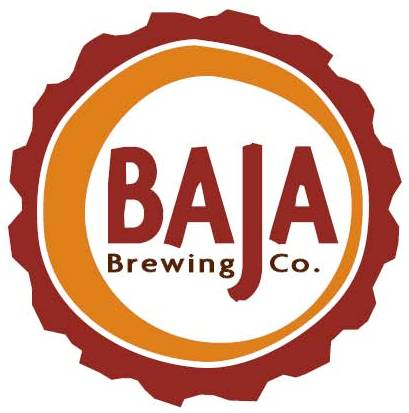
- Industry: Beer Brewer
- Founded: 2007
- Founder: Jordan Gardenhire, Charlie Gardenhire
- Headquarters: San José del Cabo, Mexico
- Website: bajabrewingcompany.com

Baja Brewing Company is a craft brewery located in San Jose del Cabo, Baja California Sur, Mexico.

== History ==
Baja Brewing Company was founded by Jordan Gardenhire and his father Charlie Gardenhire in 2007. The father-son duo moved to Los Cabos, Mexico from Colorado and opened the Baja Brewery in the town of San Jose del Cabo. Baja Brewing Company was established as the first brewery in the state of BCS. A third partner Robert Kelly became involved to open and manage the three Baja Brewing Company restaurants located in San Jose del Cabo and Cabo San Lucas.

In December 2014 the company organized "the first craft beer festival in Cabo, bringing in 10 breweries from throughout Mexico."

== Brands ==
The company produces 8 styles of draft beer and 6 styles of bottled beer that are sold throughout Mexico. Draft brands available for regional consumption include Baja Blond, Baja Razz, Escorpion Negro (black scorpion), Peliroja Red (Redhead Red), Peyote Pale Ale, Baja Oatmeal Stout, Cactus Wheat and Mango Wheat.

The Brewery bottles six styles of beer: Baja Blond; a cream ale with 5.5% alc. by vol., Baja Black; black ale with 5.5% alc. by vol., Baja Razz; fruit beer with natural raspberry juice, 5.5% alc. by vol., Baja Red; amber ale with 5.8% alc. by vol. and Baja Stout; Oatmeal Stout beer with 5.8% alc. by vol. and the flagship beer Cabotella Ale, a Mexican blond ale with 5.5% alc. by vol. Cabotella and is distributed in the United States as well as Mexico.

== Locations ==
The original restaurant was opened in San Jose Del Cabo in 2007. A second location was opened in 2009 on the seventh floor of the Corazon Cabo Beach Resort on Medano Beach in Cabo San Lucas Production is done at the San Jose Del Cabo location and a Tijuana production facility that was opened in 2019.

== Awards ==
- Cabotella – Gold Medal – Artisan Awards 2014
- Cabotella – Silver Medal – Copa Cervezas de America 2014
- Baja Black – Silver Medal – cerveza mexico 2014
- Baja Red – Silver Medal – cerveza mexico 2014
- Baja Red – Bronze Medal – Copa Cervezas de America 2014
- Baja Razz – Bronze Medal – Copa Cervezas de America 2014
