= Pineda Covalin =

Mexican fashion brand

- Product type: Fashion design
- Current owner: Cristina Pineda and Ricardo Covalín
- Produced by: Cristina Pineda and Ricardo Covalín
- Country: Mexico
- Introduced: 1996
- Website: https://www.pinedacovalin.com

Pineda Covalin is a Mexican fashion house that works to promote the culture from its country, on national and international scale.

== History ==
Pineda Covalin was established in 1995 by Cristina Pineda (who has a bachelor in fabric design and masters in arts design) and Ricardo Covalín (bachelor in industrial design) in Mexico City. The company began manufacturing cufflinks and ties for firms like The Coca-Cola Company and Volkswagen in order to finance their own fashion projects. Their first handkerchief / silk scarf, was created and inspired by a trip Cristina Pineda made to Mérida, where she spent a month living in the Dzoncauich town. There she met Doña Celsa, a henequen dyer with whom she worked with to create the first designs for handbags and accessories.

The firm was conceived under the idea of a "...a cultural rather than a fashion product." Initially, Pineda Covalin sold their products in museums such as the National Museum of Anthropology and the Palacio de Bellas Artes in Mexico City. The brand's commercial success allowed it to start the distribution of their products in hotels. Their product line now includes ties, kerchiefs, handbags, cushions and other luxury items, inspired by indigenous populations such as the Huicholes, Mayans and Zapotecs.

== Work and Inspiration ==
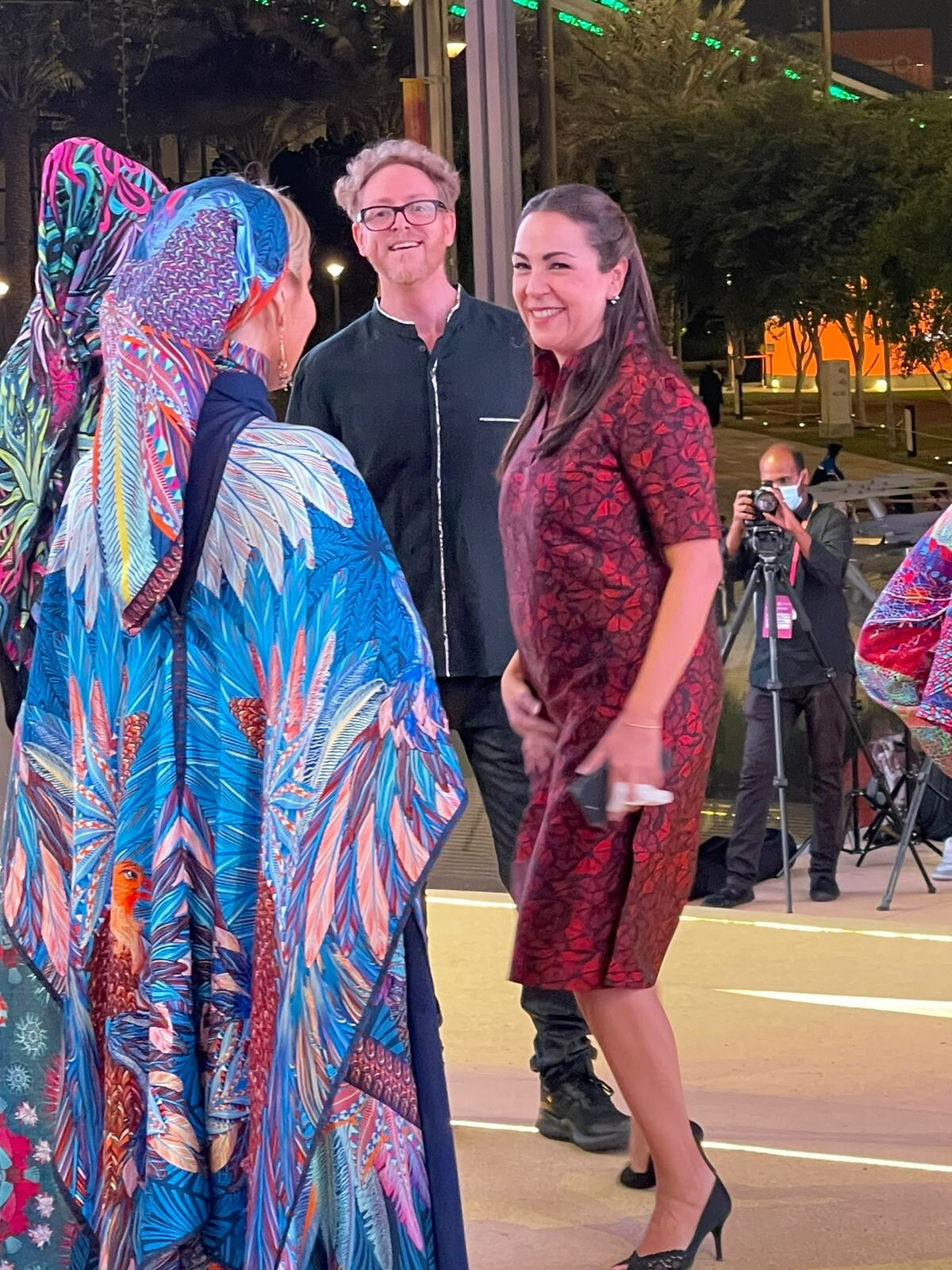
Cristina Pineda and Ricardo Covalin at Mexican Fashion Week at Expo 2020 Dubai.

Pineda Covalin's designs are inspired by elements of Mexican indigenous and contemporary art, as the brand works to portray the diversity of Mexico through its cultures. Their designs are characterized for having representations of cultural elements such as architecture, sculpture, painting, codices, gastronomy and people themselves.

Cristina Pineda states that the purpose of their designs is also to "create a bridge of communication among Latin America (countries)", as they invite consumers to know more about the culture through products that tell stories. Ricardo Covalín supports the statement, saying that these stories also belong to all the participants in the creation process, as well as the generations that have helped maintain techniques and traditions alive up to our days.

Their designs are product of an "interdisciplinary and creative" process, where designers, historians and anthropologists collaborate after analyzing tendencies in the industry and putting them together with their concepts and values. Along with this, the brand makes use of higher quality materials (mainly silk) in order to portray Mexican culture with "subtlety and modernity," and position themselves among international brands.

=== Collaborations ===
The brand has collaborated for more than 15 years with several artisan families in the country such the López family (from Arrazola, Oaxaca), the Juventino Díaz and family (from Xalitla, Guerrero) and the Carrillo brothers (from Real de Catorce, San Luis Potosí). Pineda Covalin has also collaborated with institutions and associations, as well as designers like Macario Jiménez and the Vladimirovich. The brand also works with young designers, who each season are given a chance to become creative directors. Some of these include Daniel Andrade, Kris Goyri, Jorge Duque and Vanessa Guckel among others.

=== Xico ===
Xico is a project developed by Cristina Pineda that aims to motivate young artists to create. Xico the Xoloitzcuintle (Mexican dog breed) is the mascot of the project, inspired by the Aztec culture as representing a "loyal adventure partner and a symbol of national identity."

== National and International Presence ==
=== Distribution and Availability ===
Already a nationally known brand in Mexico with over 40 outlets. Pineda Covalin continues to expand with the opening of new boutiques in Soho, New York in addition to projects in Panama and Qatar.

=== Awards and Participations ===
Pineda Covalin has been the recipient of several awards since the turn of the century. The brand was awarded with the Silver Star Award in 2002 (Premio Estrella de Plata) by Fashion Group México. In 2005 Pineda Covalin was chosen to take part in the International Fashion Show in Europe and in 2006 the brand was an ambassador of Mexican fashion at the UN.
