= Spanish missions in Baja California =

The Spanish missions in Baja California were a large number of religious outposts established by Catholic religious orders, the Jesuits, the Franciscans and the Dominicans, between 1683 and 1834. The missionary goal was to spread the Christian doctrine among the Indigenous peoples living on the Baja California peninsula. The missions gave Spain a valuable toehold in the frontier land, and would also act as a deterrent to prevent pirates from using the peninsula of Las Californias as a jumping off point for contraband trade with mainland New Spain. Missionaries introduced European livestock, fruits, vegetables, and industry into the region. Indigenous peoples were severely impacted by the introduction of European diseases such as smallpox and measles; furthermore, the expulsion of the Jesuits from the Spanish Empire in 1767 ripped the social fabric of the peninsula, although Franciscans were sent to replace them. In 1769, the Franciscans moved to Upper California, leaving Dominicans in charge of Baja California. By 1800, indigenous numbers were a fraction of what they had been before the arrival of the Spanish, yet even today many people living in Baja California are of indigenous heritage.

By 1834, all missions in Mexico had been secularized by the Mexican secularization act of 1833, and the last of the missionaries departed in 1840. Under secularization, native mission congregations lost their communal rights to the lands which they had farmed since baptism. Some of the mission churches survive and are still in use.

In 1840 the Roman Catholic Diocese of California was founded but, after the U.S. conquest of "Northern" California and the Guadalupe Hidalgo Treaty (1848), the missions in Baja California were put under the apostolic administration of the Archdiocese of Mexico City (officially in 1853 but de facto since 1849, they became a vicariate administrated by an auxiliary bishop in 1855). A new Apostolic Vicariate was founded in 1874 for Baja California (predecessor of the current Archdiocese of Tijuana).

== Background ==
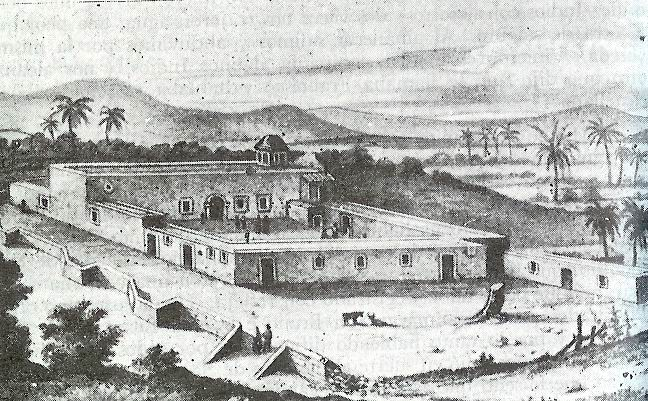
Misión de Nuestra Señora de Loreto Conchó was the second mission established on the Baja California Peninsula

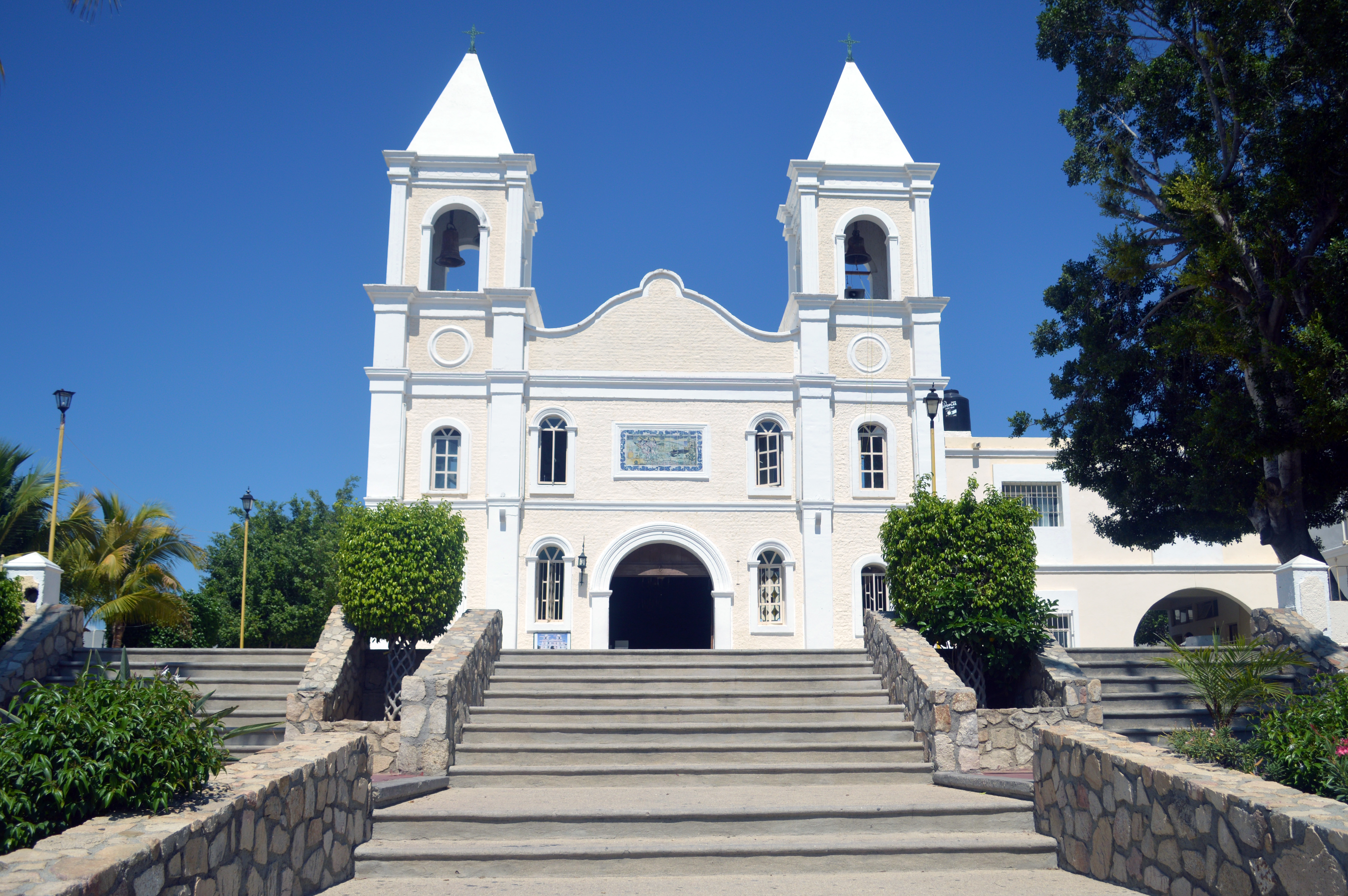
Mission San José del Cabo, the southernmost mission established on the Baja California Peninsula

As early as the voyages of Christopher Columbus, the Kingdom of Spain sought to establish missions to convert pagans to Catholicism in Nueva España (New Spain). New Spain consisted of the Caribbean, Mexico, and portions of what is now the Southwestern United States. To facilitate colonization, the Catholic Church awarded these lands to Spain.

In addition to the presidio (royal fort) and pueblo (town), the misión was one of three major agencies employed by the Spanish crown to extend its borders and consolidate its colonial territories. Asistencias ("sub-missions" or "contributing chapels") were small-scale missions that regularly conducted Catholic religious services on days of obligation, but lacked a resident priest. Smaller sites called visitas ("visiting chapels") also lacked a resident priest, and were often attended only sporadically. Since 1493, the Crown of Spain had maintained missions throughout Nueva España.

Between 1683 and 1685, Eusebio Kino established a mission at San Bruno, but he did not have enough political or financial support to sustain the community, and returned to the mainland where he established Mission Dolores on the opposite side of the Gulf of California among the Pima. In 1696, the Pious Fund for the Californias was founded at Jesuit headquarters in Mexico City, the idea being that this endowment could produce enough revenue every year to give the critical financial support to a second missionary effort, which was undertaken by Juan Maria Salvatierra in 1697 starting with Mission Loreto. For every 10,000 Spanish dollars donated to the fund by wealthy merchants, the Jesuit living an austere life in the Peninsula would receive 500 Spanish dollars which was used to support himself, but also to import tools and cloth for native congregants and decorations for the church. Aside from this 500 Spanish dollar annual income, each frontier mission aimed to be self-supporting. Supplies came at times from the mainland, either from sister missions in Sonora via Guaymas or from merchants in Tepic near the port of Matanchel, which the Jesuits used. The Manila galleon stopped regularly at Cabo San Lucas 1734 to 1767, and was a more inexpensive source of supply. Ignacio Tirsch, a Jesuit friar of the 1760s, drew a picture of such a Manila galleon trading at Mission San Jose del Cabo.

To sustain a mission, the padres needed colonists or converted indigenous Americans, called neophytes, to cultivate crops and tend livestock in the volume needed to support a fair-sized establishment. A scarcity of imported materials and of skilled laborers compelled the colonizers to employ simple building materials and methods. Although the Spanish hierarchy considered the missions temporary ventures, individual settlement development was not based simply on "priestly whim": the founding of a mission followed longstanding rules and procedures. In Jesuit times, a donation of an additional 10,000 Spanish dollars was a prerequisite. In addition, the paperwork involved required months, sometimes years, of correspondence, and demanded the attention of virtually every level of the bureaucracy. Once empowered to erect a mission in a given area, the men assigned to it chose a specific site that featured a good water supply, proximity to a population of indigenous peoples, and arable land. The padres, their military escort and often converted mainland indigenous people or mestizos initially fashioned defendable shelters, from which a base was established and the mission could grow.

Construction of the iglesia (church) constituted the focus of the settlement, and created the center of the community. The majority of mission sanctuaries were oriented on a roughly east–west axis to take the best advantage of the sun's position for interior illumination. The workshops, kitchens, living quarters, storerooms, and other ancillary chambers were usually grouped in the form of a quadrangle, inside which religious celebrations and other events often took place.

== The Native Americans ==
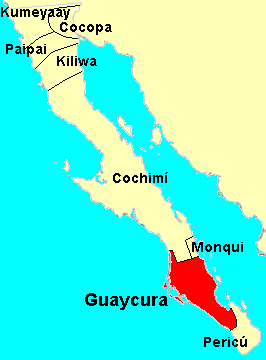
Locations of the indigenous peoples of the Baja California Peninsula, highlighting the Guaycura people

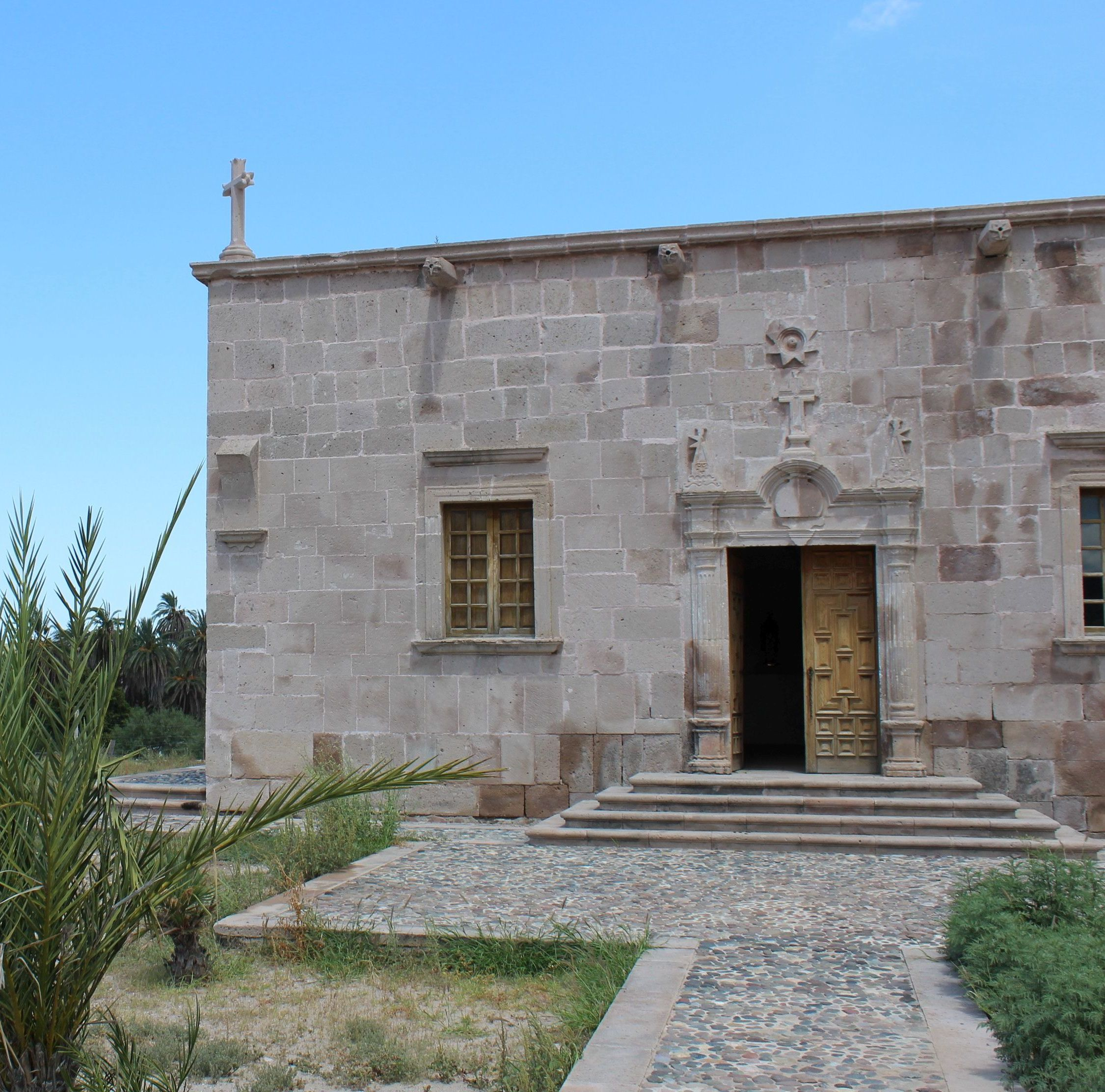
Misión Santa Gertrudis.

Indian peoples encountered by the Spanish missionaries in Baja California (from north to south) were the Kumeyaay, Cocopah, Pai Pai, Kiliwa, Cochimi, Monqui, Guaycura, and Pericu. The Kumeyaay and Cocapah practiced limited agriculture, but the majority of the Baja Californians were nomadic or semi-nomadic hunter-gatherers who eked out a living under difficult desert conditions and scarcity of fresh water.

In a policy followed throughout much of Latin America called reductions, the missionaries concentrated the Indians at or near the mission for religious instruction and training to become sedentary farmers and stock herders. Their goal was to create a self-sufficient theocracy in which the missionary, usually supported by Spanish soldiers and laymen, attempted to rule over every facet of the Indian's religious and secular lives. The Indigenous peoples were housed often by gender, forcibly converted to Catholicism and acculturated to the Spanish Empire within the confines of the mission. Recalcitrant indigenous peoples often ran away or revolted, and many missions maintained a precarious existence during the colonial era. Use of firearms, corporal punishment in the form of whippings and religious ritual and psychological punishments were all methods employed by the missionaries to maintain and expand control. There were instances of armed resistance by the Indians against the missions, notably the Pericue revolt of 1734–1737, and Indians at the missions frequently ran away to escape the religious and labor regime forced on them by the missionaries or sabotaged the missionary's efforts by passive resistance.

At the time of first contact with the Spanish, the Native Americans living in Baja California may have numbered as many as 60,000. By 1762, their numbers had fallen to 21,000 and by 1800 to 5,900. The primary reason for the decline was recurrent epidemics of European diseases, primarily smallpox, measles, and typhus. The spread of disease was facilitated by the missionary's practice of congregating the population near the mission. Endemic syphilis resulted in higher child mortality and a reduced birth rate. By the early 19th century, the tribes of Baja California were culturally extinct, except for the Kumeyaay, Cocopah, and Pai Pai.

== Missions in Baja California ==
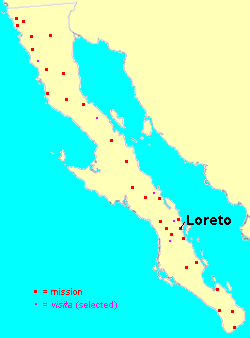
Baja California and the location of the Missions, highlighting the location of Mission Loreto

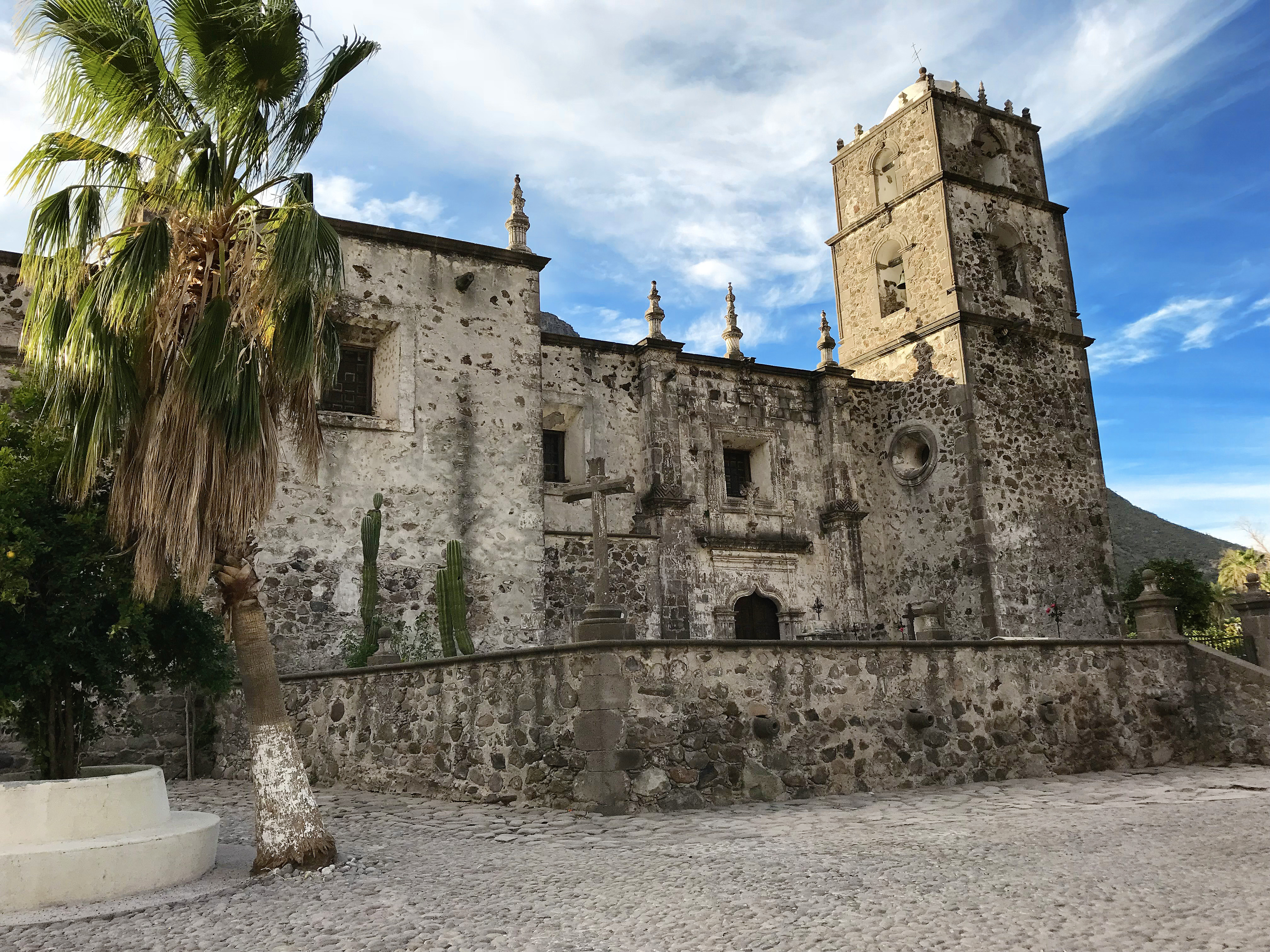
Misión San Francisco Javier de Viggé-Biaundó.

Fortún Jiménez de Bertadoña discovered the Baja California Peninsula in early 1534. However, it was Hernán Cortés who recognized the peninsula as the "Island of California" in May 1535, and is therefore officially credited with the discovery. In January 1683, the Spanish government chartered an expedition consisting of three ships to transport a contingent of 200 men to the southern tip of Baja California. Under the command of the governor of Sinaloa, Isidoro de Atondo y Antillón, and accompanied by Jesuit priest Eusebio Francisco Kino, the ships made landfall in La Paz. The landing party was eventually forced to abandon its initial settlement due to the hostile response on the part of the natives. The missionaries attempted to establish a settlement near present-day Loreto, which they named Misión San Bruno, but failed for lack of supplies. Kino went on to establish a number of missions in the Pimería Alta, now located in southern Arizona, USA and Sonora, Mexico.

The Jesuit priest Juan María de Salvatierra eventually managed to establish the first permanent Spanish settlement in Baja California, the Misión Nuestra Señora de Loreto Conchó. Founded on October 19, 1697, the mission become the religious center of the peninsula and administrative capital of Las Californias. From there, other Jesuits went out to establish other settlements throughout the lower two-thirds of the peninsula, founding 17 missions and several visitas (sub-missions) between 1697 and 1767.

Unlike the mainland settlements that were designed to be self-sustaining enterprises, the remote and harsh conditions on the peninsula made it all but impossible to build and maintain these missions without ongoing assistance from the mainland. Supply lines from across the Gulf of California, including from the missions and ranches of Padre Eusebio Kino on the mainland to the Port of Guaymas, played a crucial role in keeping the Baja California mission system intact.

During the sixty years that the Jesuits were permitted to work among the natives of California, 56 members of the Society of Jesus came to the Baja California peninsula, of whom 16 died at their posts (two as martyrs). Fifteen priests and one lay brother survived the hardships, only to be subjected to enforcement of the decree launched against the Society by King Carlos III of Spain. It was rumored that the Jesuit priests had amassed a fortune on the peninsula and were becoming very powerful. On February 3, 1768, the King ordered the Jesuits forcibly expelled from the Americas and returned to the home country. Gaspar de Portolà was appointed Governor of Las Californias, with orders to supervise the Jesuit expulsion and oversee the installation of replacement Franciscan priests.

The Franciscans, under the leadership of Fray Junípero Serra, took charge of the missions and closed or consolidated several of the existing installations. A total of 39 Friars Minor toiled on the peninsula during the five years and five months of Franciscan rule. Four of them died, 10 were transferred to new northern missions, and the remainder returned to Europe.

Governor Portolà was put in command of an expedition to travel north and establish new settlements at San Diego and Monterey. Serra went along as leader of the missionaries, to establish missions in those places. On the way north, Serra founded Misión San Fernando Rey de España de Velicatá. Francisco Palóu was left in charge of the existing missions, and founded the Visita de la Presentación in 1769.

Representatives of the Dominican order arrived in 1772, and by 1800, had established nine more missions in northern Baja, all the while continuing with the administration of the former Jesuit missions. The peninsula was divided into two separate entities in 1804, with the southern one having the seat of government established in the Port of Loreto. In 1810, Mexico sought to end Spanish colonial rule, gaining her independence in 1821, after which Mexican President Guadalupe Victoria named Lt. Col. José María Echeandía governor of Baja California Sur and divided it into four separate municipios (municipalities). The capital was moved to La Paz in 1830, after Loreto was partially destroyed by heavy rains. In 1833, after Baja California was designated as a federal territory, the governor formally put an end to the mission system by converting the missions into parish churches.

== Mission locations ==
There were 30 missions and 11 visitas in Baja California stretching the entire length of the Baja California Peninsula. From Playas de Rosarito through to the southernmost mission in San José del Cabo, the missions were:

List of missions in Baja California and Baja California Sur, north to south
Name	Image	Location	Date founded	Order	Notes
Misión El Descanso (San Miguel la Nueva)		Playas de Rosarito; 32°12′19″N 116°54′19″W	1810	Dominicans	The mission was relocated 600 m (2,000 ft) northeast in 1830, with only the foundations remaining at the original site. The second site was abandoned in 1834. In ruins.
Misión San Miguel Arcángel de la Frontera		La Misión; 32°05′39″N 116°51′16″W	28 March 1787	Dominicans	Abandoned in 1834. In ruins.
Misión de Nuestra Señora de Guadalupe del Norte		Valle de Guadalupe; 32°05′31″N 116°34′27″W	June 1834	Dominicans	Abandoned in 1840. In ruins.
Misión Santa Catarina Virgen y Mártir		Santa Catarina; 31°39′37″N 115°49′16″W	12 November 1797	Dominicans	Abandoned in 1840. Nonextant.
Misión Santo Tomás de Aquino		Santo Tomás; 31°33′30″N 116°24′49″W	24 April 1791	Dominicans	Relocated twice in 1794 and 1799. Abandoned in 1849. First and third sites in ruins. Second site nonextant.
Misión San Vicente Ferrer		San Vicente; 31°16′13″N 116°11′08″W	August 1780	Dominicans	In ruins
Misión San Pedro Mártir de Verona		Ensenada Municipality; 30°47′24″N 115°28′21″W	27 April 1794	Dominicans	Abandoned in 1811. In ruins.
Misión Santo Domingo de la Frontera		near Vicente Guerrero; 30°46′15″N 115°56′14″W	1775	Dominicans	Relocated in 1798. Abandoned in 1839. Both sites in ruins.
Misión Nuestra Señora del Santísimo Rosario de Viñadaco		El Rosario; 30°02′29″N 115°44′20″W	1774	Dominicans	The mission was relocated 2.4 km (1.5 mi) to the southwest in 1802 and abandoned in 1832. Both sites are in ruins.
Misión San Fernando Rey de España de Velicatá		San Quintín Municipality; 29°58′16″N 115°14′12″W	14 May 1769	Franciscans	Abandoned in 1818. In ruins.
Misión Santa María de los Ángeles		near Cataviña; 29°43′54″N 114°32′50″W	1767	Jesuits	The mission was demoted to the status of visita in 1769. Abandoned in 1818. In ruins.
Misión San Francisco Borja de Adac		San Quintín Municipality; 28°44′40″N 113°45′15″W	1762	Jesuits	The mission church dates to 1801. Abandoned in 1818.
Misión Santa Gertrudis		San Quintín Municipality; 28°03′04″N 113°05′07″W	1752	Jesuits	Abandoned in 1822. Restoration in 1997 substantially altered its historical character.
Misión San Ignacio Kadakaamán		San Ignacio; 27°17′02″N 112°53′55″W	1728	Jesuits	The mission church dates to 1786. Abandoned in 1840
Misión Nuestra Señora de Guadalupe de Huasinapi		Mulegé Municipality; 26°55′09″N 112°24′21″W	1720	Jesuits	Abandoned in 1795. In ruins.
Misión Santa Rosalía de Mulegé		Mulegé Municipality; 26°53′07″N 111°59′09″W	1705	Jesuits	The mission church dates to 1766. Abandoned in 1828. Restored.
Misión San Bruno		Loreto Municipality; 26°13′58″N 111°23′54″W	7 October 1684	Jesuits	First Spanish mission on the Baja California peninsula. Abandoned in 1685. In ruins.
Misión La Purísima Concepción de Cadegomó		La Purísima; 26°11′26″N 112°04′23″W	1720	Jesuits	The mission was relocated 16 km (9.9 mi) to the southeast in 1735 and abandoned in 1822. Both sites in ruins.
Misión San José de Comondú		near San José de Comondú; 26°03′35″N 111°49′20″W	1709	Jesuits	The mission was relocated 29 km (18 mi) southwest to the Visita de San Miguel in 1736. The mission was then relocated 2.7 km (1.7 mi) northeast to the site of Visita de San Ignacio in 1737. Abandoned in 1827. In ruins.
Misión de Nuestra Señora de Loreto Conchó		Loreto; 26°00′37″N 111°20′36″W	25 October 1697	Jesuits	First successful Spanish mission on the Baja California peninsula. The mission church dates to 1774. Abandoned in 1829.
Misión San Francisco Javier de Viggé-Biaundó		San Javier; 25°51′37″N 111°32′37″W	1699	Jesuits	The mission church dates to 1758. Abandoned in 1817.
Misión San Juan Bautista Malibat (Liguí)		Liguí; 25°44′22″N 111°15′51″W	November 1705	Jesuits	Abandoned in 1721. Nonextant; buried beneath an arroyo between 2001 and 2017.
Misión Nuestra Señora de los Dolores del Sur Apaté		La Paz Municipality; 25°03′19″N 110°53′03″W	1721	Jesuits	The mission was relocated to the Visita de La Pasión in 1741. Abandoned in 1741. In ruins.
Misión San Luis Gonzaga Chiriyaqui		Comondú Municipality; 24°54′29″N 111°17′27″W	1721	Jesuits	The mission church dates to the 1750s. Abandoned in 1768.
Misión Nuestra Señora de los Dolores del Sur Chillá (La Pasión)		La Paz Municipality; 24°53′14″N 111°01′50″W	1741	Jesuits	The Visita de La Pasión was elevated to the status of mission in 1741. Abandoned in 1768. In ruins.
Misión de Nuestra Señora del Pilar de La Paz Airapí		La Paz; 24°09′42″N 110°18′47″W	1720	Jesuits	Relocated to Todos Santos and abandoned in 1748. Nonextant.
Misión Santiago el Apóstol Aiñiní (Las Coras)		Santiago; 23°28′32″N 109°43′02″W	1724	Jesuits	Abandoned in 1795. Only stone foundations remain (private).
Misión Santa Rosa de las Palmas (Todos Santos)		Todos Santos; 23°27′37″N 110°13′08″W	1733	Jesuits	The Visita de Todos Santos was elevated to the status of mission. Abandoned in 1748. Nonextant; site occupied by a playground.
Misión Nuestra Señora del Pilar de la Paz		Todos Santos; 23°26′59″N 110°13′31″W	1748	Jesuits	The mission relocated from La Paz to Todos Santos in 1748, about 1.3 km (0.81 mi) southwest of Misión Santa Rosa de las Palmas. Relocated again in 1825, the site of which is occupied by a church. The final site was abandoned in 1840.
Misión Estero de las Palmas de San José del Cabo Añuití		San José del Cabo; 23°03′44″N 109°41′45″W	1730	Jesuits	The original mission was destroyed during the 1734 Pericú Revolt and relocated twice in 1735 and 1753. Abandoned in 1840.

=== Visita locations ===
Visitas were branch missions that allowed the priests to extend their reach into the native population at a modest cost.

List of visitas in Baja California and Baja California Sur, north to south
Name	Location	Date founded	Order	Notes
Visita de San Telmo	San Telmo; 30°58′05″N 116°05′31″W	1798	Dominicans	Visita of Misión Santo Domingo de la Frontera.
Visita de San Isidoro	near Vicente Guerrero; 30°45′55″N 115°32′50″W		Dominicans	Visita of Misión San Pedro Mártir de Verona. In ruins.
Visita de San Juan de Dios	San Quintín Municipality; 30°10′58″N 115°10′05″W	1769	Franciscans	Visita of Misión San Fernando Rey de España de Velicatá. Only stone foundations remain.
Visita de Calamajué (Calamyget)	San Quintín Municipality; 29°25′16″N 114°11′42″W	October 1766	Jesuits	Visita of Misión San Francisco Borja. The visita was abandoned in 1767. Only eroded fountaions remain.
Visita de Santa Ana	San Quintín Municipality; 28°41′25″N 113°49′14″W		Jesuits	Visita of Misión San Francisco Borja de Adac. In ruins.
Visita de San Pablo	Mulegé Municipality; 27°42′08″N 113°08′42″W		Jesuits	Visita of Misión Nuestra Señora de los Dolores del Sur Chillá. In ruins.
Visita de San José de Magdalena	near San José Magdalena; 27°03′30″N 112°10′07″W	1774	Dominicans	Visita of Misión Santa Rosalía de Mulegé. Abandoned in 1828. In ruins.
Visita de San Juan Bautista Londó	Loreto Municipality; 26°13′31″N 111°28′25″W	1699	Jesuits	Visita of Misión de Nuestra Señora de Loreto Conchó. The visita was abandoned in 1750, the ruins of which date to 1705.
Visita de la Presentación	Loreto Municipality; 25°43′45″N 111°32′37″W	1769	Franciscans	Visista of Misión San Francisco Javier de Viggé-Biaundó. Abandoned in 1817. In ruins.
Visita de Angel de la Guarda (El Zalato)	La Paz Municipality; 23°53′28″N 110°10′15″W	1721	Jesuits	Visita of Misión de Nuestra Señora del Pilar de La Paz Airapí. In ruins.
Visita de San Jacinto	Los Cabos Municipality; 23°14′34″N 110°04′38″W		Jesuits	Visita of Misión Santa Rosa de las Palmas (Todos Santos). In ruins.

=== In chronological order ===
==== Jesuit Establishments (1684–1767) ====
- Misión San Bruno, founded in 1684
- Misión de Nuestra Señora de Loreto Conchó, founded in 1697
- Visita de San Juan Bautista Londó, founded in 1699
- Misión San Francisco Javier de Viggé-Biaundó, founded in 1699
- Misión San Juan Bautista Malibat (Misión Liguí), founded in 1705
- Misión Santa Rosalía de Mulegé, founded in 1705
- Misión San Jose de Comondú founded in 1709
- Misión La Purísima Concepción de Cadegomó founded in 1720
- Misión de Nuestra Señora del Pilar de La Paz Airapí founded in 1720
- Misión Nuestra Señora de Guadalupe de Huasinapi founded in 1720
- Misión Santiago de Los Coras founded in 1721
- Misión Nuestra Señora de los Dolores del Sur Apaté, founded in 1721
- Visita de Angel de la Guarda (El Zalato), founded in 1721
- Misión Santiago el Apóstol Aiñiní (Las Coras), founded in 1724
- Misión San Ignacio Kadakaamán, founded in 1728
- Misión Estero de las Palmas de San José del Cabo Añuití, founded in 1730
- Misión Santa Rosa de las Palmas (Misión Todos Santos), founded in 1733
- Misión San Luis Gonzaga Chiriyaqui, founded in 1740
- Misión Nuestra Señora de los Dolores del Sur Chillá (Misión La Pasión), founded in 1741
- Misión Nuestra Señora del Pilar de la Paz, founded in 1748
- Misión Santa Gertrudis, founded in 1752
- Misión San Francisco Borja de Adac, founded in 1762
- Visita de Calamajué (Visita de Calamyget), founded in 1766
- Misión Santa María de los Ángeles, founded in 1767

==== Franciscan Establishments (1768–1773) ====
- Misión San Fernando Rey de España de Velicatá, founded in 1769
- Visita de San Juan de Dios, founded in 1769
- Visita de la Presentación, founded in 1769

==== Dominican Establishments (1774–1834) ====
- Misión Nuestra Señora del Santísimo Rosario de Viñadaco, founded in 1774
- Visita de San José de Magdalena, founded in 1774
- Misión Santo Domingo de la Frontera, founded in 1775
- Misión San Vicente Ferrer, founded in 1780
- Misión San Miguel Arcángel de la Frontera, founded in 1787
- Misión Santo Tomás de Aquino, founded in 1791
- Misión San Pedro Mártir de Verona, founded in 1794
- Misión Santa Catarina Virgen y Mártir, founded in 1797
- Visita de San Telmo, founded in 1798
- Misión El Descanso (Misión San Miguel la Nueva), founded in 1810
- Misión de Nuestra Señora de Guadalupe del Norte, founded in 1834

== See also ==
On Spanish Missions in neighboring regions:

- Spanish missions in California
- Spanish missions in the Sonoran Desert

On general missionary history:

- Catholic Church and the Age of Discovery
- List of the oldest churches in Mexico

On colonial Spanish American history:

- Spanish colonization of the Americas
- California mission clash of cultures
