= Visita de San Juan Bautista Londó =

17th-century Spanish visita in Baja California Sur, Mexico

- Location in Baja California Location in Mexico
- Location: Loreto Municipality, Baja California Sur, Mexico
- Coordinates: 26°13′31″N 111°28′25″W
- Name as founded: Visita de San Juan Bautista Londó
- Patron: John the Baptist
- Founded: 1699
- Founded by: Juan María Salvatierra and Francisco María Piccolo
- Founding Order: Jesuits
- Native tribe(s) Spanish name(s): Cochimí

The Visita de San Juan Bautista Londó was a Catholic visita located at the Cochimí settlement of Londó in what is now Loreto Municipality, Baja California Sur, Mexico. The visita was founded by Jesuit missionaries Juan María Salvatierra and Francisco María Piccolo in 1699 as an extension of Misión de Nuestra Señora de Loreto Conchó.

== History ==
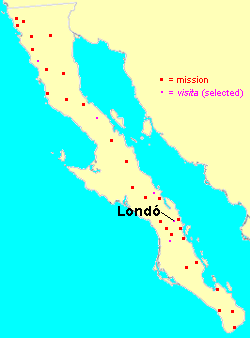
Location of Visita de San Juan Bautista Londó among the Spanish missions in Baja California

The visita was located about 30 km (19 mi) north of Loreto and 13 kilometers west of the Gulf of California coastline, west of the abortive mission site of San Bruno that had been occupied in 1684–1685 by Isidro de Atondo y Antillón and Eusebio Francisco Kino.

The first permanent stone structures at Londó were first constructed in 1705.

By 1750, the Cochimí population of the visita had been relocated to Misión San José de Comondú. Ruins now attest to the former presence of the visita.

== See also ==
- List of Jesuit sites
- Spanish missions in Baja California Sur
