= Visita de San Telmo =

18th-century Spanish visita in Baja California, Mexico

- Location in Baja California Location in Mexico
- Location: San Telmo, Baja California, Mexico
- Coordinates: 30°58′05″N 116°05′31″W
- Name as founded: Visita de San Telmo
- Patron: Saint Telmo
- Founded: 1798-1800
- Founding Order: Dominican

The Visita de San Telmo was a Catholic visita located along the Arroyo de San Telmo in Baja California, Mexico. The visita was founded by Dominican missionaries sometime between 1798 and 1800 as an extension of Misión Santo Domingo de la Frontera.

== Overview ==
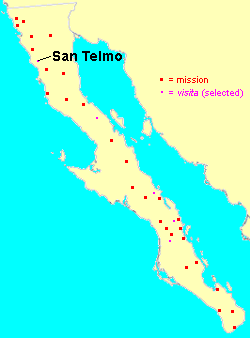
Location of the Visita de San Telmo among the Spanish missions in Baja California

The visita was located about 26 km (16 mi) to the northwest of Misión Santo Domingo de la Frontera and 34 km (21 mi) south of Misión San Vicente Ferrer.

When geographer Peveril Meigs investigated the area in 1926, he identified two areas on the Arroyo de San Telmo that had apparently been developed for agricultural use by the Dominicans: San Telmo de Arriba and San Telmo de Abajo, the latter being about 4 kilometers downstream to the southwest from the former.

== See also ==
- Missions in Baja California
- Missions in Baja California Sur
