= Misión Santa Catarina Virgen y Mártir =

18th-century Spanish mission in Baja California, Mexico

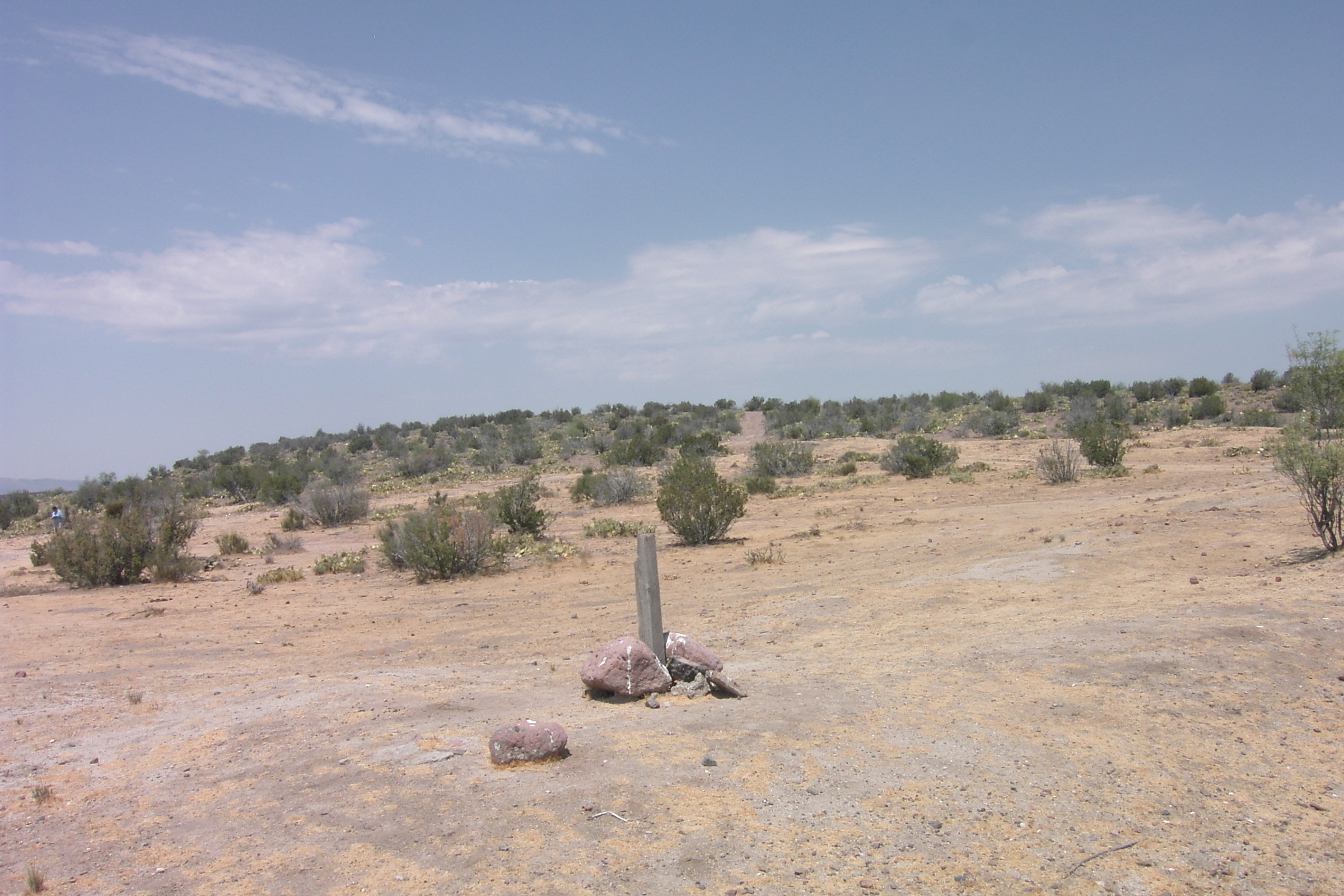
- Landmark demarcating the site of the original mission complex

- Location in Baja California Location in Mexico
- Location: Valle del Álamo, Baja California, Mexico
- Coordinates: 31°39′37″N 115°49′16″W
- Patron: Catherine of Alexandria
- Founded: 12 November 1797
- Founded by: José Loriente
- Founding Order: Dominican
- Native tribe(s) Spanish name(s): Paipai and Kumeyaay

Mission Santa Catarina (Spanish: Misión Santa Catarina Virgen y Mártir) was a Spanish mission in present-day Valle del Álamo in Baja California, Mexico. It was founded on 12 November 1797 by the Dominican missionary José Loriente. Virtually nothing remains of the original structures. Archaeological investigations of the mission's traces are in progress.

== Location ==
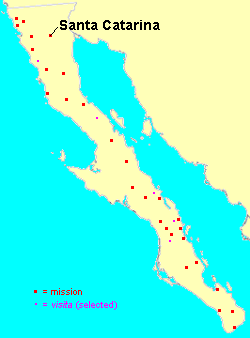
Location of Mission Santa Catarina among the Spanish missions in Baja California

The site chosen for the mission lay on a plateau at an elevation of 1,183 metres (3,881 ft) above sea level, surrounded by an irrigable valley in the Sierra de Juárez, some 62 kilometres (39 mi) east of Mission Santo Tomás. The location was previously known to the native Paipai as Ha'ketepohol, meaning "water that falls loudly". Following the precedent of Mission San Pedro Mártir, it was the second and last of the Baja California missions to be situated in such mountainous terrain.

Today, Santa Catarina is a village of the Paipai and Kumeyaay people.

== Mission history ==
The potential mission site was identified in 1794 by a military party led by Sergeant José Manuel Ruiz and accompanied by missionary Tomás Valdellón. In 1796 lieutenant José Joaquín de Arrillaga, a former gobernor (governor) of the Californias, confirmed the suitability of the site.

A key factor in the selection of this location was its proximity to the pass of Portezuelo, on a route that led east to the desert and to the Colorado River. The mission was intended as a defensive fort against eastern intruders as well as a center for converting the local Indians to Christianity.

Physical construction of the Mission complex began on August 6, 1797. By 1812, the administration of the mission had been turned over to the authorities at Mission San Vicente. Yet in 1824, the mission was home to 600 neophytes, making it the most populous of the Dominican missions in Baja California at that time.

From the onset, the missionaries had to deal with the theft of cattle and attacks by the locals. In 1840, hostile raiders struck, killing 16 neophytes and burning the mission. Mexican soldiers launched a punitive expedition, but the mission was not rebuilt.

=== Accounts of the mission's demise ===
An account of the destruction of the mission was given by a Santa Catarina Indian:

A year or two after Fray Félix left for Guadalupe, one September, when most of the people were away from Santa Catalina getting piñon to the northward along the eastern slope of the Sierra Juarez, the Keliwa came and burned the mission. The sacristan and a few old women were there, but they escaped. (A more authentic version states that sixteen of the neophytes were killed in the attack.) Nicuárr, with 500 of his people, pursued the Keliwa into the San Pedro Mártir Sierra and killed most of them (Meigs 1935:122–123).

Still other accounts maintain that the uprising that destroyed the mission included not only the Kiliwa but also the Paipai, Kumeyaay from La Huerta, and Colorado River groups such as the Quechan and Cocopa as well:

They were without a leader in the attack; all fought like animals. They all hated the frailes: the Indians died when the frailes came. They hated the missionaries. (Meigs 1935:123)

Thereafter, the Kiliwa renamed Santa Catarina Wa'iú-ichíu, a combination of the words wa (house), iú (empty), and ichíu (burned).

=== Appropriation by the Mexican Government ===
Following the Mexican War of Independence, the 1.5 million acres of land owned by the mission was appropriated by the anticlerical Mexican government. In 1855, the Mexican government granted ownership of the lands of the ex-mission of Santa Catarina to General Ricardo Palacio for his patriotic service to the nation. The grant was made on the conditions that 1) Palacio take possession of the land and have it surveyed within three years, 2) build six houses on the property, and 3) that the land would not be sold to a non-citizen or foreign buyer. In 1861 or 1862, General Palacio passed some of the land to a Manual Castro, who in turn sold it to William Denton, which began the land's passage through several foreign hands. In response, the Mexican government nullified the original grant to General Palacio on the grounds that Palacio had not complied with the conditions of the grant. Ownership of the former lands of Mission Santa Catarina continued to be contested as late as 1916.

== The Mission compound ==
As a defensive measure, the 77 × 53 m mission proper was enclosed by a substantial wall. A watchtower was constructed at the northeast corner, and the only access to the compound was a via a single door located at the south corner.

Valdellón reported in 1797 that the Santa Catarina capilla (chapel) was constructed of adobe bricks and measured 10 × 5 m, and featured a flat roof; it housed a 150 cm tall statue of Saint Catherine of Alexandria. The missionary living quarters measured little more than 25 m², as did the granary. There were also ancillary structures housing three workshops and a women's dormitory, each measuring 5 m square. Additional support buildings were constructed in 1798 and 1799.

As agriculture was fundamental for the subsistence of the site, mission industries consisted mainly of the cultivation of wheat and maize, and the raising and trading of cattle, donkeys, goats, horses, mules, and sheep.

The nearby rancherías of Agua Caliente, Agua Caliente del Portezuelo, Cerro Colorado, El Portezuelo, El Rincón, La Ciénega, La Huerta, Los Bateques, Poza de González, San Pablo, and Sangre de Cristo were integrated into the Mission holdings.

== List of resident padres ==
The following account of Santa Catarina's resident priests is based on the President of the Missions' nómina sacra, or chart of "sacred names":

- 1674-1689 Bachiller Diego Lucero de Godoy
- 1797–1804 Tomás Valdellón
- 1804–1807 Jacinto Fiol
- 1807–1809 Manuel de Águila
- 1809–1810 Antonio Fernández
- 1810–1811 José Duro
- 1811–1812 Manuel Sáiz
- 1812–1815 no information available
- 1815–1817 Antonio Fernández
- 1817–1819 no information available
- 1819–1839 Félix Caballero

== See also ==
- Spanish missions in Baja California
