= Juan de Ugarte =

Central American Jesuit priest and missionary

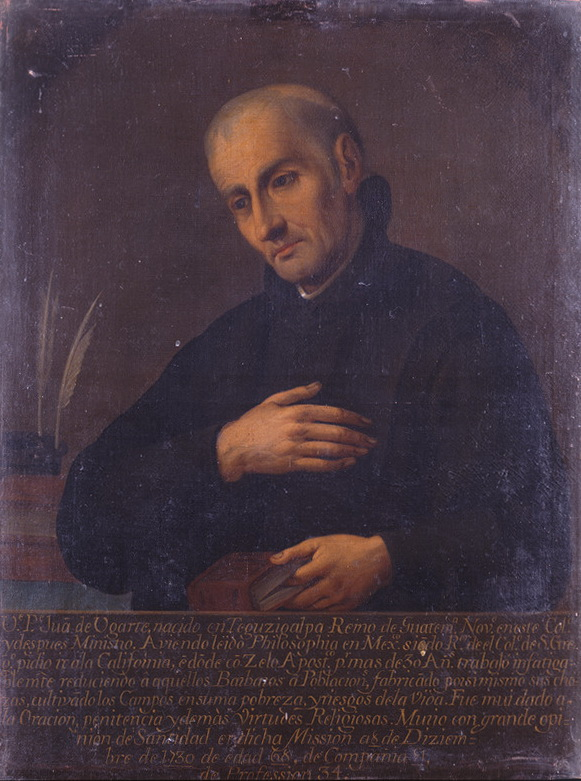
Juan de Ugarte, S.J.

Juan de Ugarte, S.J., (1662–1730) was a Jesuit missionary and explorer in Baja California Sur, New Spain, and the successor to Juan María de Salvatierra as head of the peninsula's missions.

Ugarte was born in Tegucigalpa, then in the Kingdom of Guatemala, part of New Spain, today Honduras. He went to Mexico to enter the Society of Jesus in 1679. His younger brother, Pedro de Ugarte, was also a Jesuit missionary in Baja California. After his ordination, he was assigned to teach philosophy at the Colegio Máximo de San Pedro y San Pablo in Mexico City. It was there that he came to know two fellow Jesuits coming from Europe who were headed to the missions on the frontier of the Spanish Empire, the Italian Salvatierra and the Italo-German Eusebio Kino. Through conversing with them, Ugarte chose to commit his life to these missions as well.

Ugarte was initially the procurator for the newly established missions of California in 1697–1700. As such, he was stationed in Mexico City, administering the Pious Fund of the Californias, a fund of private donations that supported the missions, and seeing to the logistical support necessary to sustain them.

In 1701, Ugarte went to the peninsula as its third missionary, following in the footsteps of Salvatierra and Francisco María Piccolo. Stopping first at Mission Loreto, he proceeded to Mission San Francisco Javier which had been abandoned the previous year due to threats from the native population, arriving there in 1702. It was there that he established his home for the rest of his life, among the Cochimí Indians. Ugarte was an able and energetic leader in the expansion and development of the mission system. He served as visitador or Visitator for the missions in Salvatierra's absence and after the latter's death in 1717.

Ugarte led several expeditions of overland exploration to seek out mission or visita sites in the region surrounding San Javier. More spectacularly, he oversaw the construction of a ship, "El Triunfo de la Cruz", from locally harvested lumber called gueribo found at Sierra "La Giganta". In September 1720, Ugarte sailed his new ship from Loreto to La Paz to help found a new mission there. In the following year, he sailed to the head of the Gulf of California, trying to resolve the longstanding question of whether California was an island or a peninsula.

He died at Mission San Francisco Javier in 1730.
