= Francisco María Píccolo =

Jesuit priest and missionary

Francisco María Piccolo, S.J., (Francesco Maria Piccolo or Francisco Picolo) (1654–1729) was one of the first Jesuit missionaries in Baja California Sur, New Spain, now Mexico. His letters and reports are important sources for the ethnography and early history of the peninsula.

== Biography ==
Piccolo was born in Palermo, Sicily on 25 March 1654, then part of the Kingdom of Spain. He entered the Society of Jesus in 1673. He completed his period of formation and was ordained. He then volunteered for the missions of New Spain

Piccolo arrived in the Americas in 1684, when he went on to serve as a Jesuit missionary for 13 years among the Tarahumara of Chihuahua before being assigned to the new Baja California mission field. During this period, in 1689, he made his final religious profession as a member of the Society. Eusebio Francisco Kino, S.J., the original driving force behind the Jesuit effort, who had made two unsuccessful attempts at establishing a mission, was unable to participate when his project finally became a reality. As a consequence, Juan Maria Salvatierra, S.J., was the lone missionary in establishing Mission Loreto among its Monqui inhabitants in 1697. Piccolo crossed the Gulf of California to be Salvatierra's assistant about a month later.

Piccolo founded the second Baja California mission, San Francisco Javier, among the Cochimí, in 1699 and served there until 1701, when he abandoned the mission due to threats from the indigenous population. He then returned to Mexico City, where he worked for the interests of the Baja California Jesuit missions. He was assigned to serve as visitador (Visitator) for the Jesuit missions in Sonora from 1705–1709, after which he returned to Baja California and served at Mission Santa Rosalia until 1718. He was then transferred to Mission Loreto, where he remained until his death there on 22 February 1729.

== Works ==
His Informe or Report of 1702, published in Mexico City, was an influential early account of the peninsular missions, although its optimism about the potential of Baja California was something of an embarrassment to later Jesuit apologists. He conducted several exploratory trips seeking neophytes and future mission sites, including journeys to what would later be Mulegé, Mission La Purísima and Mission San Ignacio. His accounts of these travels contain additional ethnographic information on the native Cochimí.

== Sources ==
- Burrus, Ernest J. 1984. Jesuit Relations: Baja California, 1716–1762. Dawson's Book Shop, Los Angeles.
- Crosby, Harry W. 1994. Antigua California: Mission and Colony on the Peninsular Frontier, 1697–1768. University of New Mexico Press, Albuquerque.
- Dunne, Peter Masten. 1952. Black Robes in Lower California. University of California Press, Berkeley.
- Piccolo, Francisco María. 1962. Informe del estado de la nueva cristiandad de California. Edited by Ernest J. Burrus. José Porrúa Turanzas, Madrid.
- Piccolo, Francisco María. 1967. Informe on the New Province of California, 1702. Edited by George P. Hammond. Dawson's Book Shop, Los Angeles.
