= Misión Nuestra Señora de los Dolores del Sur Chillá =

18th-century Spanish mission in Baja California Sur, Mexico

Coordinates: 25.055583°N 110.884539°W

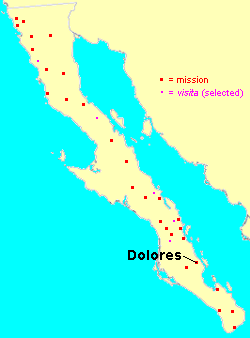

The Jesuit missionary Clemente Guillén founded Mission Dolores in 1721 and sponsored by the Marqués de Villapuente de la Peña, on the Gulf coast of Baja California Sur, Mexico, about midway between Loreto and La Paz in Baja California Sur, Mexico. The mission was dedicated to Our Lady of Sorrows.

== History ==
Dolores drew its initial neophytes from the earlier, unsuccessful mission at Malibat or Ligüí to the north.

In 1723, the mission site was moved to the Guaycura settlement of Apaté, about 4 kilometers inland from the coast. It was moved again in 1741 by Lambert Hostell to a location which had previously functioned as its visita of La Pasión, known as Chillá or Tañuetía ("place of the ducks"), about 25 kilometers southwest of Apaté.The mission was subsequently reduced to the status of a visita of Mission San Luis Gonzaga.

It was finally abandoned in 1768, when the Franciscans took over control of the Baja California missions from the Jesuits. The remaining neophytes were relocated to Todos Santos.

== See also ==
- Missions in Baja California Sur
- List of Jesuit sites
