= Sigismundo Taraval =

Italian Jesuit missionary

Sigismundo Taraval SJ (Italian: Sigismondo Traballi; 1700–1763) was a pioneering Italian Jesuit missionary in Baja California who wrote important historical accounts of the peninsula.

== Biography ==
Born in Lodi, Lombardy, he served initially as missionary at La Purísima (1730–1732) and San Ignacio (1732-1733), among the Cochimí. A notable episode while he was at San Ignacio was the bringing of the inhabitants of Cedros Island to the mission. In a relatively detailed account of the islanders' aboriginal lifeways, Taraval presented what were perhaps the earliest speculations concerning the region's prehistoric past.

In 1733, he was sent south to found the Misión Santa Rosa de las Palmas at the modern site of Todos Santos. The following year, the local Pericú and Guaycura Indians staged a serious revolt against Jesuit rule, and Taraval was forced to flee, first to La Paz and then to Isla Espíritu Santo. He wrote a detailed if partisan account of the revolt and its subsequent suppression.

Subsequently, Taraval later served at the southern missions of San José del Cabo (1736–1746) and Santiago (1747–1750). He left the peninsula in 1750 to serve at the Jesuit college in Guadalajara.

Taraval Street in San Francisco is named after him.
