= Visita de San José de Magdalena =

18th-century Spanish visita in Baja California Sur, Mexico

- Location in Baja California Location in Mexico
- Location: near San José Magdalena, Baja California Sur, Mexico
- Coordinates: 27°03′40″N 112°13′25″W
- Name as founded: Visita de San José de Magdalena
- Patron: Saint Joseph
- Founded: 1774
- Founded by: Joaquín Valero
- Founding Order: Dominican
- Native tribe(s) Spanish name(s): Cochimí

The Visita de San José de Magdalena was a Catholic visita located between Mulegé and Santa Rosalía in Baja California Sur, Mexico. The visita was founded by Dominican missionary Joaquín Valero in 1774 as an extension of Misión Santa Rosalía de Mulegé.

== History ==
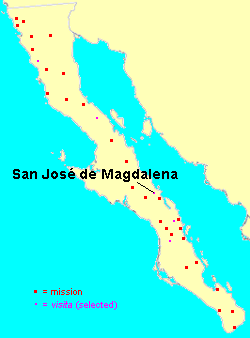
Location of Visita de San José de Magdalena among the Spanish missions in Baja California

Building a visita, or subordinate mission station, at the site 16 kilometers west of the Gulf of California was initially proposed by the Franciscan missionary Francisco Palóu prior to the Dominicans' assumption of responsibility for the Baja California missions.

The visita was terminated when the mission at Mulegé was closed in 1828. Ruined walls of stone and adobe brick survive at the site.

== See also ==
- Spanish missions in Baja California Sur
