= Visita de la Presentación =

18th-century Spanish visita in Baja California Sur, Mexico

- Location in Baja California Location in Mexico
- Location: Loreto Municipality, Baja California Sur, Mexico
- Coordinates: 25°44′36″N 111°31′51″W
- Name as founded: Visita de la Presentación
- Patron: The Presentation of Mary
- Founded: 1769
- Founded by: Francisco Palóu
- Founding Order: Franciscans

The Visita de la Presentación was a Catholic visita located in Baja California Sur, Mexico. The visita was founded by Franciscan missionary Francisco Palóu in 1769 as an extension of Misión San Francisco Javier de Viggé-Biaundó.

== Overview ==
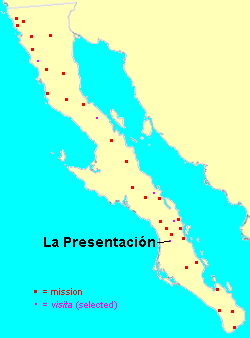
Location of Visita de la Presentación among the Spanish missions in Baja California

The visita is located about 16 kilometres (9.9 mi) north of Misión San Francisco Javier de Viggé-Biaundó, and 40 km southwest from Loreto.

The visita was abandoned in 1817. Substantial remnants of stone structures and the water system survive.

== See also ==
- Spanish missions in Baja California Sur
