= Mission San Juan Bautista (disambiguation) =

Mission San Juan Bautista may refer to any of the following missions, all of which are named for John the Baptist:

- Mission San Juan Bautista, in San Juan Bautista, California, United States
- Misión San Juan Bautista Malibat, near Loreto, Baja California Sur, Mexico
- Mission San Juan Bautista (Mexico), in Guerrero, Coahuila, Mexico
