= Misión Nuestra Señora de Guadalupe de Huasinapi =

18th-century Spanish mission in Baja California Sur, Mexico

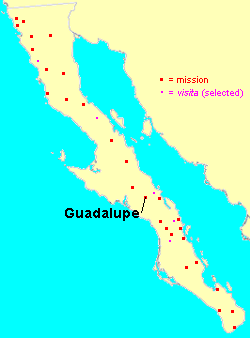

Mission Guadalupe was established by the Jesuit Everardo Helen in 1720, at the Cochimí settlement of Huasinapí in the Sierra de la Giganta about 40 kilometers west of Mulegé, Baja California Sur, Mexico. The mission was named after Our Lady of Guadalupe.

== History ==
The mission went through a typical trajectory of demographic decline experienced by the Baja California missions, as the neophyte population dwindled under the impact of Old World diseases. The mission was abandoned in the Dominican period, in 1795, when its residents were transferred to La Purísima. Surviving traces of Mission Guadalupe include building walls, dams, and graveyards.

Mission site: 26°55′9.50″N 112°24′20.60″W

Road access: travel west from Mulegé about 25 miles (40 km) [intersection is at 26°45′47.99″N 112°15′43.30″W] then north about 12 miles (19 km). The road is rough but passable.

== See also ==
- Missions in Baja California Sur
- List of Jesuit sites
