= Félix Caballero =

Félix Caballero was a Dominican priest. He played an important part in the history of the missions of Baja California, and also the opening up of the route to Tucson, Arizona.

Caballero arrived at Veracruz on December 19, 1812, and traveled to Baja California in July, 1814. The first records of his activities on the Peninsula can be traced back to December 15 of that year, where he presided over a burial service at Misión San Vicente Ferrer.

In 1815, he was placed in charge of the Misión San Miguel Arcángel de la Frontera. In 1822 he was one of only three Dominicans in the mission.

On April 14, 1823, Father Caballero and two companions set out from Mission Santa Catalina to reconnoiter a road between Las Californias and Sonora, closed since the revolt of the Yuma in the 1780s. They crossed the lower Colorado River in Cocopa territory to avoid the Yumas, then the Tinajas Altas, then turned northeast to reach the Gila River where he encountered some villages of friendly Halchidhomas, then continued up the Gila through Cocomaricopa and Pima territory and reached Tucson twelve walking days after leaving Santa Catalina and then continued on to Arizpe. He returned to Mission Santa Catalina from Tucson with a military expedition under Captain José Romero who was to establish a route for a mail service through the region.

In 1834 he founded Misión de Nuestra Señora de Guadalupe del Norte, the last Dominican mission to be established in California. The mission survived only until 1840, when a local chief, Jatñil, who had previously provided support to the missions, led a rebellion in response to forced conversions of his people.
