= Misión San Pedro Mártir de Verona =

18th-century Spanish mission in Baja California, Mexico

- Location in Baja California Location in Mexico
- Location: Ensenada Municipality, Baja California, Mexico
- Coordinates: 30°47′24″N 115°28′21″W
- Name as founded: Misión San Pedro Mártir de Verona
- Patron: Saint Peter
- Founded: April 27, 1794
- Founding Order: Dominican
- Native tribe(s) Spanish name(s): Kiliwa

Mission San Pedro Mártir de Verona (Spanish: Misión San Pedro Mártir de Verona) was established by the Dominican missionary José Loriente on 27 April 1794, in the Sierra de San Pedro Mártir mountain range in northern Baja California, Mexico.

Located above 1,500 meters elevation and far inland, Mission San Pedro Mártir appears to represent an initiative by the Dominicans to extend control over the Kiliwa people who had lived outside the scope of the earlier coastal missions.

The first site of the mission was Casilepe; later in the same year it was relocated to Ajantequedo, about 13 kilometers to the northeast. The date for the closing of the mission is somewhat uncertain, being reported as both 1806 and 1824. The mission's neophytes were relocated to Mission Santo Domingo.

== Conservation ==
Archaeological explorations have located possible traces of the first mission site. Foundations and walls survive at the second mission site.

== See also ==
- Spanish missions in Baja California
