= Monqui =

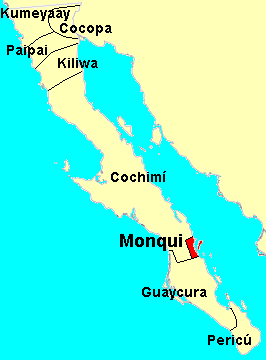
Map of Monqui lands

The Monqui were indigenous peoples of Mexico (American Indians), who lived in the vicinity of Loreto, Baja California Sur, Mexico, at the time of Spanish contact. Monqui territory included about 65 kilometres (40 mi) of coast along the Gulf of California and extended a few kilometers inland to where the Cochimi people lived.

Probably first encountered by explorers traveling up the Gulf of California during the sixteenth century, the Monqui were subjected to some of the peninsula's earliest intensive Jesuit missionary efforts during the late seventeenth century. The Tyrolean Jesuit Eusebio Francisco Kino, together with Admiral Isidoro de Atondo y Antillon, unsuccessfully attempted to establish Misión San Bruno on the northern margin of Monqui territory in 1684-1685. The first permanent mission and settlement in Baja California was founded in Monqui territory at Loreto in 1697 by Juan María de Salvatierra.

In contrast to many of their Jesuit colleagues, Kino and Salvatierra included relatively few notes on native ethnography in their letters and reports. Most of what is known about the aboriginal culture of the Monqui comes from incidental comments in explorers' accounts and at second hand in the works of the Jesuit historian Miguel Venegas (1757, 1979).

== Culture ==
Kino, with years of experience on the frontier, said that the Indians of Baja California had the most difficult existence of any he had seen. The Jesuit missionaries early perceived that the nomadic Monqui could be attracted to the missions and Christianity by the promise of food, often exchanged for work. The Monqui and other Baja Californian Indians were hunter-gatherers who harvested a wide range of natural resources from the shores of the Gulf, as well as in interior valleys and the Sierra de la Giganta. The land could support less than one person per square kilometer. Their material culture was sparse, based on what they could carry with them on their endless peregrinations in search of food. The Monqui "had no agriculture, no fixed places of residence, no permanent or portable shelters, and little clothing -- none on men, and only grass skirts on women. They had no boats, no pottery, and no domestic animals -- not even the dog....many of them change their sleeping quarters more than a hundred times a year." Their social organization was based on autonomous local communities (rancherias) that sometimes were hostile to each other. Unappreciated by the Spanish, however, the Monqui and their neighbors had egalitarian societies and were adept at using local resources to produce basketry, personal decorations, and weapons and utensils of wood. The people of Baja California made pigments by powdering rocks and created thousands of large, elaborate, and often abstract rock paintings, some of which are preserved in a World Heritage Site of UNESCO in the San Francisco Mountains north of Monqui territory

Traditional Monqui culture had probably disappeared before the end of the eighteenth century, under the impacts of mission acculturation and the decimation caused by Old World epidemic diseases.

== Population and decline ==
In the small and austere area they occupied the Monqui probably never numbered more than a few hundred persons. The Jesuits recorded the names of eight Monqui rancherias but by the end of 1698, nearly all the Monqui, totaling about 400 persons, lived near the Loreto Mission. Thereafter, their numbers decreased rapidly because of a heavy death toll from European diseases. By 1733, the Indian, mostly Monqui, population of Loreto was only 134. By 1770 the few remaining Monqui were submerged in a population of Loreto that consisted mostly of Spanish, people of mixed races (mestizos), and Christian Indians imported from the mainland or from other parts of Baja California.
