= Misión San Francisco Javier de Viggé-Biaundó =

17th-century Spanish mission in Baja California Sur, Mexico

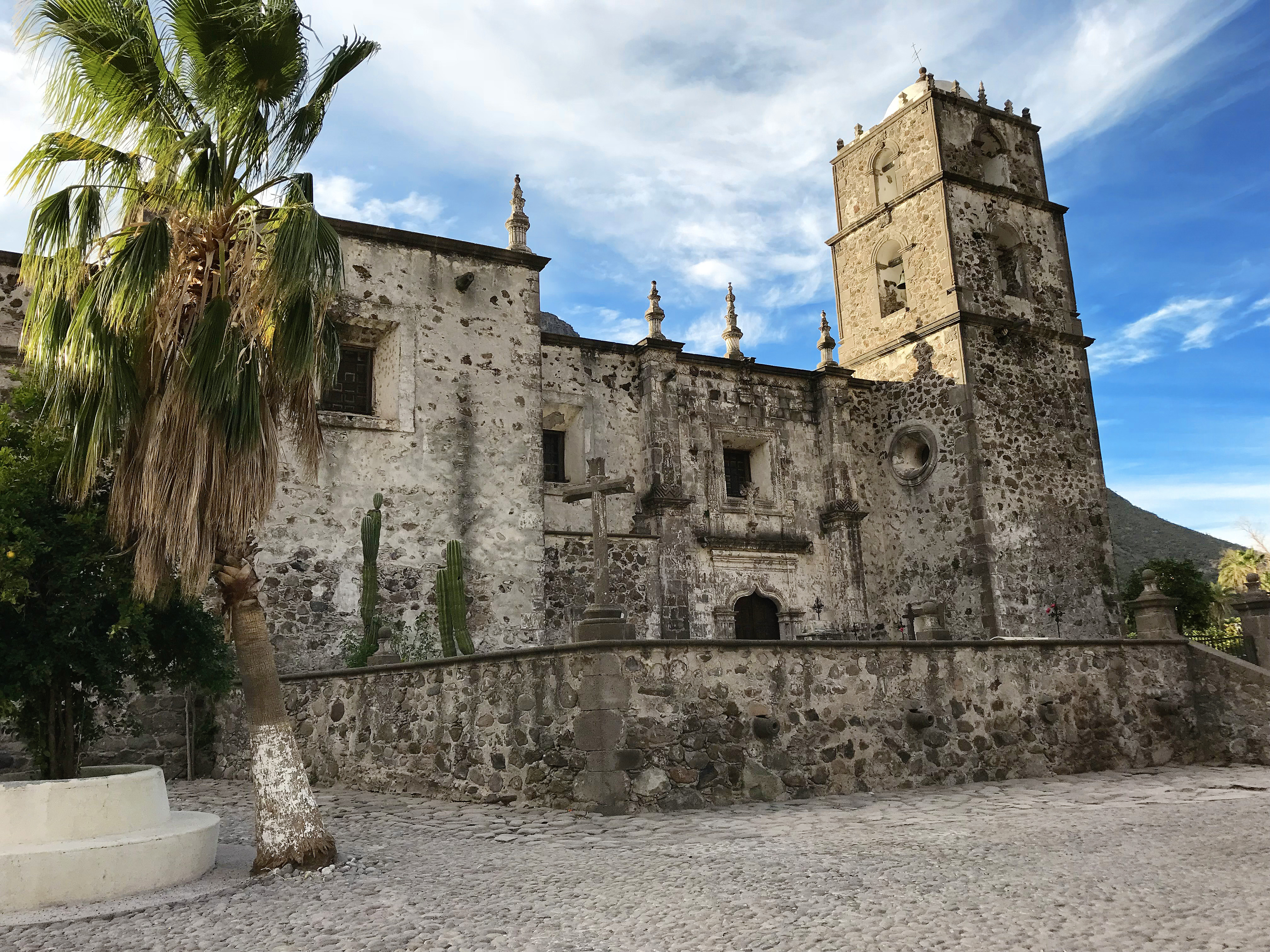
Mission San Javier

Misión San Francisco Javier de Viggé-Biaundó was a Spanish mission in San Javier, Baja California Sur, on the Baja California peninsula. It was built during the colonial era of the Viceroyalty of New Spain. The site is in present-day Loreto Municipality of Baja California Sur state. The mission was located at 25°51′38″N 111°32′37″W. San Francisco Javier mission was founded by Jesuits of the Roman Catholic church in 1699 and closed in 1817.

The missionary's objective was to convert the local Cochimí Native Americans (Indians) to Christianity. A mission church survives and is in use.

== Etymology ==
The mission was dedicated to Francis Xavier, a Navarrese Catholic missionary and saint who was a co-founder of the Society of Jesus.

== History ==
The Jesuits established Misión de Nuestra Señora de Loreto Conchó in 1697 in Loreto, but it quickly became obvious that the Loreto site had too little water to be suitable for agriculture and, thus, could not become self-sustaining. The Jesuits were told by Cochimi visitors to Loreto of potential agricultural land across the nearby Sierra de la Giganta. In May 1699 Francisco Maria Piccolo, along with a dozen Cochimí guides and ten Spanish soldiers, crossed the mountains on horseback and entered the valley the Indians called Biaundó, about 20 kilometres (12 mi) inland from the Gulf of California. (The other part of the mission's name, Viggé, was the Cochimí word for "mountain.") The inhabitants of a Cochimí rancheria at the site were friendly and Piccolo baptized 30 of their children.

In October 1699, Piccolo returned with a contingent of Spanish soldiers and Indian converts and began to construct the mission. Piccolo dedicated the mission on December 3, 1699, and San Francisco Javier (also Xavier) became the second most enduring mission established in Baja California. The mission was abandoned in 1701 because of a threatened Indian revolt, but reestablished by Juan de Ugarte in 1702. However, efforts to grow crops proved unsuccessful due to lack of water for irrigation and in 1710 the mission was moved a few kilometers south to its present location which had a dependable source of water from a spring. The energetic Ugarte constructed dams, aqueducts, and stone buildings. Between 1744 and 1758, Miguel del Barco was responsible for building what has been called "the jewel of the Baja California mission churches."

== Native population ==
The Cochimí were nomadic and semi-nomadic hunter-gatherers who dwelt in the austere deserts and mountains of the central portion of the Baja California peninsula. The Cochimí were considered by the Jesuits to be less warlike and more accepting of missions and missionaries than their southern neighbors, the Guaycura and Pericues.

Food given out by the Jesuits initially drew the Cochimí to the mission, but over the longer term, the missionaries attempted to make the Cochimí sedentary farmers and herders of domestic animals. However, the concentration of the population at the mission facilitated the spread of European diseases, such as smallpox and measles. The ravages of disease caused the native population to decline steadily in the 18th century. The mission had a population of 482 in 1768, but the numbers declined to 83 in 1808. In the 19th century, the Cochimí became extinct as a culture and identifiable people.

== Abandonment ==
By 1817, the mission was deserted. The church has been restored and is now maintained by Mexico's National Institute of Anthropology and History. The village of San Javier at the site of the former mission had a population of 131 in 2010. Several introduced plant species continue to exist or to be grown at the mission: date palms, grapes, citrus, and, notably, ancient olive trees.

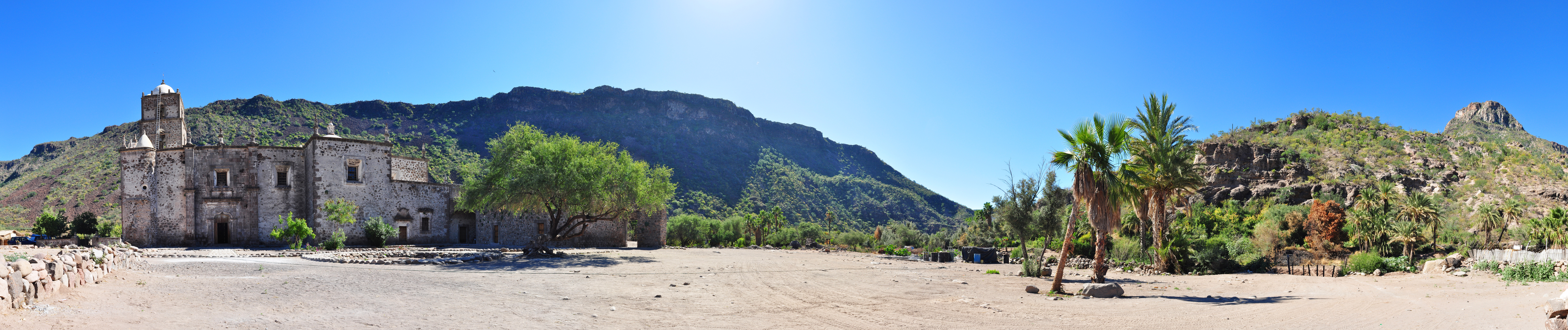
North side exterior of Misión San Francisco Javier de Viggé-Biaundó. The mission appears on the left amongst its oasis surroundings of palm trees and mountain ranges. 270° Panorama
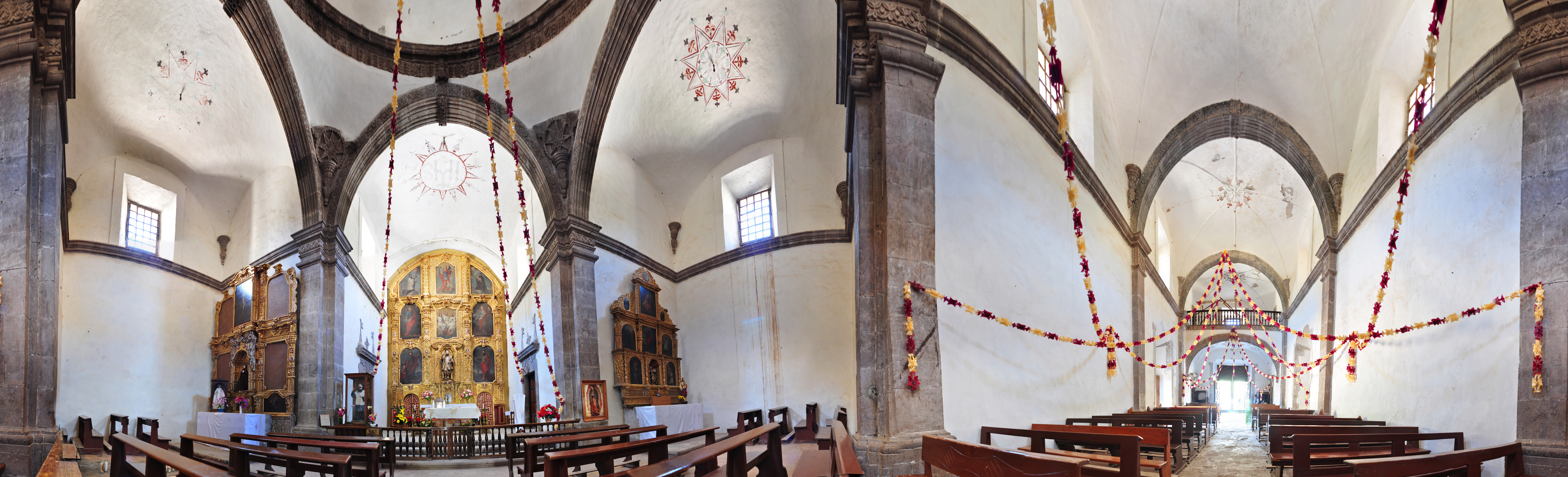
Interior of Misión San Francisco Javier de Viggé-Biaundó with Christmas decorations, San Javier, Baja California Sur, 360° Panorama

== See also ==
- Spanish missions in Baja California
- List of Jesuit sites

== Bibliography ==
- Vernon, Edward W. 2002. Las Misiones Antiguas: The Spanish Missions of Baja California, 1683–1855. Viejo Press, Santa Barbara, California.
