= Misión Santo Domingo de la Frontera =

18th-century Spanish mission in Baja California, Mexico

- Location in Baja California Location in Mexico
- Location: Near Vicente Guerrero, Baja California, Mexico
- Coordinates: 30°46′15″N 115°56′14″W
- Name as founded: Misión Santo Domingo de la Frontera
- Patron: Saint Dominic
- Founded: 1775
- Founding Order: Dominican
- Native tribe(s) Spanish name(s): Kiliwa

Misión Santo Domingo was founded among the Kiliwa Indians of Baja California, Mexico, by the Dominicans Miguel Hidalgo and Manuel García in 1775. It is located near Colonia Vicente Guerrero and northeast of San Quintín Bay.

== History ==
The first site of the mission was about 13 kilometers east of the coast, but the water supply proved to be inadequate. The mission was moved about 4 kilometers farther east in 1793. The native population dwindled under the impacts of Old World diseases, and after about 1821 the site ceased to be served by a resident priest. Ruined adobe walls survive to attest the mission's former presence.

== See also ==
- Spanish missions in Baja California
