= Misión de Nuestra Señora del Pilar de La Paz Airapí =

Spanish mission in La Paz, Baja California Sur, Mexico

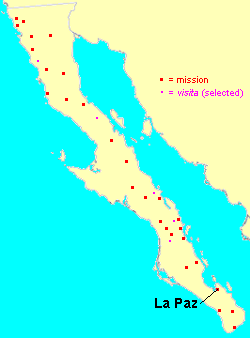

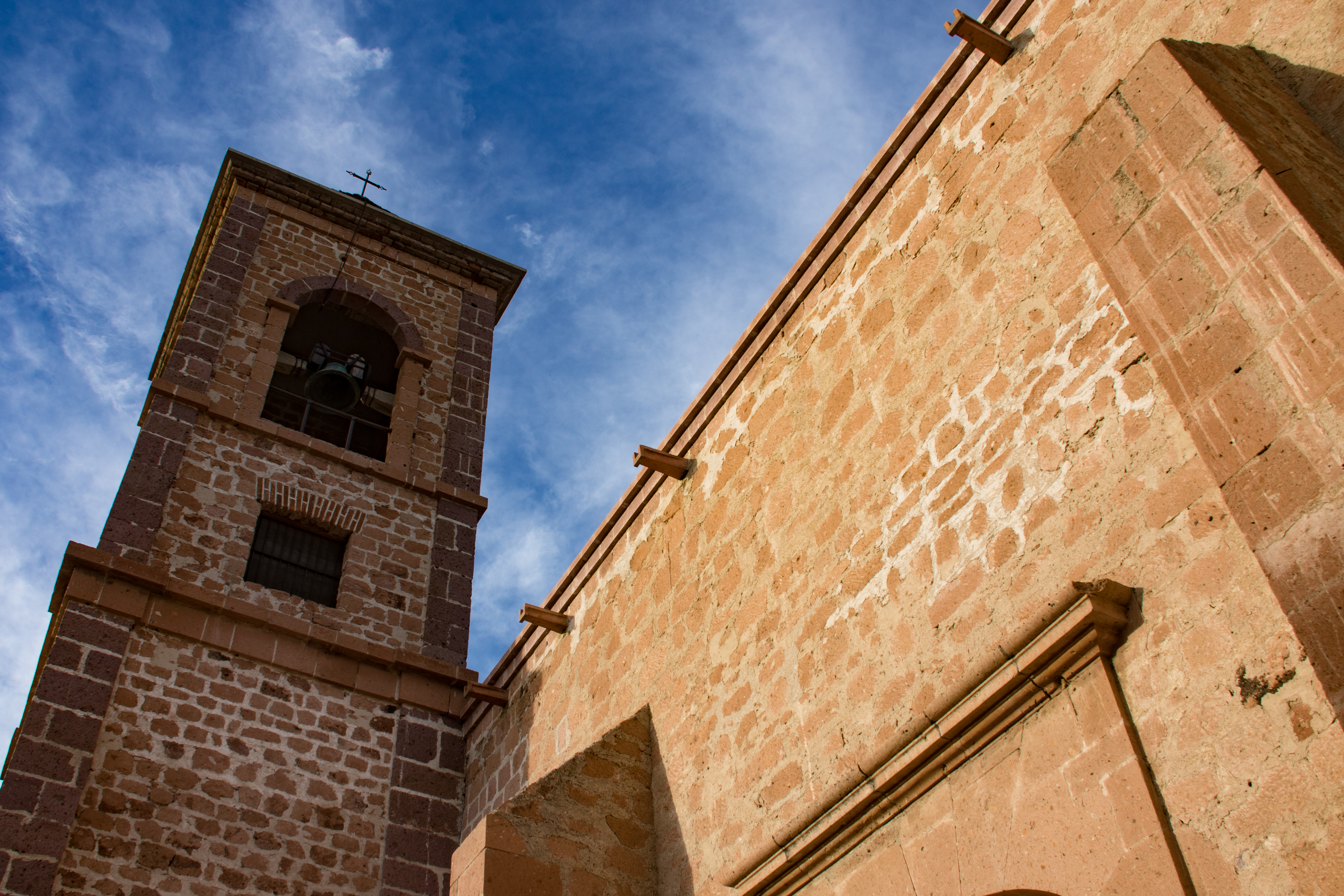
Baroque mission side

Mission La Paz was established by the Jesuit missionaries Juan de Ugarte and Jaime Bravo in 1720 and financed by the marquis José de la Puente, at the location of the modern city of La Paz, Baja California Sur, Mexico.

La Paz was the location of the earliest Spanish activity in Baja California, and was frequently the site of conflicts between the Spanish and the local Guaycura and Pericú Indians. Fortún Ximénez, mutineer on an expedition sent by Hernán Cortés, landed at La Paz in 1533. Two years later, Cortés himself led a large party that attempted but failed to establish a settlement. Sebastián Vizcaíno in 1596 gave it its anomalously pacific name. Isidro de Atondo y Antillón and Eusebio Francisco Kino attempted to establish a mission settlement in 1683 but again failed because of conflicts with the native inhabitants. When Jesuit missions finally took root in Baja California after 1697, the initial focus of activity was to the north, in the area around Loreto.

The Jesuits finally returned to the site of Airapí (probably a Guaycura name) in 1720, in coordinated expeditions from Loreto that traveled both by sea (under Ugarte and Bravo) and overland (under Clemente Guillén). The mission had little success, however. It was sacked in the Pericú Revolt of 1734 and finally abandoned in 1748, when its Indian neophytes were relocated to Todos Santos. Between 1861 and 1865 under the orders of Bishop Juan Francisco Escalante y Moreno it was reconverted into a cathedral for the new capital.

== See also ==
- Spanish missions in Baja California
- List of Jesuit sites
