= Misión de Nuestra Señora de Guadalupe del Norte =

19th century Dominican mission in Baja California, Mexico

- Location in Baja California Location in Mexico
- Location: Valle de Guadalupe, Baja California, Mexico
- Coordinates: 32°5′31″N 116°34′27″W
- Name as founded: Misión de Nuestra Señora de Guadalupe del Norte
- Patron: Mary, mother of Jesus
- Founded: June 1834
- Founding Order: Dominican
- Native tribe(s) Spanish name(s): Kumeyaay

Mission Guadalupe del Norte (Spanish: Misión Guadalupe del Norte), also known as Misión de Nuestra Señora de Guadalupe del Norte, is a Spanish mission located in Valle de Guadalupe, Baja California. It was founded by the Dominican missionary Félix Caballero in June 1834 in an area long inhabited by the Kumeyaay people. The mission was the last of the Dominican missions to be founded, and one of only two founded after Mexico gained its independence from Spain in 1821.

== Location ==
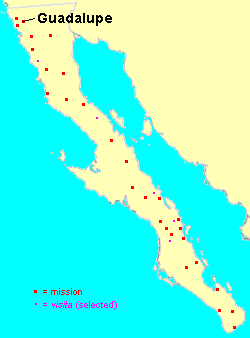
Location of Mission Guadalupe del Norte among the Spanish missions in Baja California

The mission's inland site, about 25 kilometers east of Misión San Miguel was presumably chosen for the agricultural potential of its wide valley. Wheat, olives, pears, and grapes were among the crops that were produced.

== History ==
Mission Guadalupe del Norte may have had about 400 Kumeyaay Indians in its care. However, conflicts seem to have been frequent, both with the local groups and with Quechan from as far away as the lower Colorado River. In 1840, a rebellion under a local leader, Jatñil, forced Caballero to abandon the mission.

== Construction ==
Stone foundations and adobe walls from the short-lived mission survived at the site as late as the middle twentieth century. Only the foundations of the original mission complex remain.

== See also ==
- Spanish missions in Baja California
- Misión El Descanso - the penultimate Dominican mission to be founded, 1817
- Mission San Francisco Solano - the last Franciscan mission to be founded, 1824
