= Misión San Juan Bautista Malibat =

Other missions bearing the name San Juan Bautista include the Mission San Juan Bautista in California
and the Misión San Juan Bautista in Coahuila

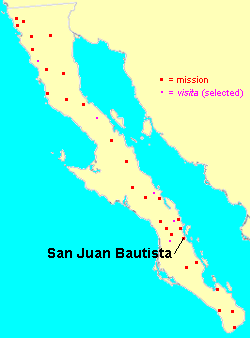

Misión San Juan Bautista Malibat, also known as the Misión San Juan Bautista de Ligüí, was founded by the Jesuit missionary Pedro de Ugarte in November 1705, about 30 kilometres (19 mi) south of Loreto near the Gulf of California coast of what is today the Mexican state of Baja California Sur. The mission is located at 25°44′22″N 111°15′51″W.

== History ==
San Juan Bautista mission had the objective of evangelizing the local Monqui Native Americans (Indians), but the mission soon ran into difficulty. The numbers of the Monqui, who called their rancheria at the site Ligui, rapidly diminished, possibly due to European diseases. They were replaced by a few dozen Cochimí people who knew the site as Malibat. The more intractable Pericúes lived on nearby islands and sometimes raided the mission and its stores. The mission lost its funding from a wealthy benefactor, water at the site was insufficient for agriculture, and at some seasons the residents had to depart the mission to search for water to drink.

Ugarte left the mission because of ill health in 1709, and, thereafter, a Jesuit missionary was not always present. The mission was closed in 1721 when the remaining Christian Indians were moved to the new mission of Dolores in the territory of the Guaycura Indians south of San Juan Bautista. Surviving archaeological remnants of the abandoned mission include several sections of building foundations.

== See also ==
- List of Jesuit sites
