= Misión San Bruno =

17th-century Spanish mission in Baja California Sur, Mexico

- Location in Baja California Sur Location in Mexico
- Location: Loreto Municipality, Baja California Sur, Mexico
- Coordinates: 26°13′57″N 111°23′53″W
- Patron: Bruno of Cologne
- Founded: October 7, 1684
- Founding Order: Jesuits
- Native tribe(s) Spanish name(s): Cochimí

Mission San Bruno (Spanish: Misión San Bruno) was a short-lived Spanish mission established by Jesuit order on October 7, 1684, in what is now the Loreto Municipality of Baja California Sur, Mexico. The mission was the first Spanish mission established on the Baja California Peninsula.

== Location ==
The ruins of the mission are located along the northern banks of an intermittent river as it flows into the Gulf of California. The mission is unrelated to the present-day town of San Bruno, which is located 110 kilometres (68 mi) to the north of the mission.

Visita de San Juan Bautista Londó, a minor visiting chapel built in 1699, is located approximately 7.5 km (4.7 mi) to the east.

== History ==
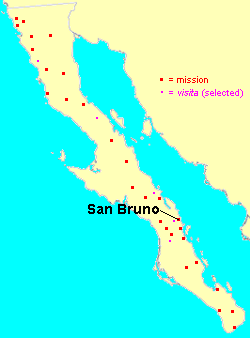
Location of Mission San Bruno among the Spanish missions in Baja California

In 1683, the Spanish admiral Isidro de Atondo y Antillón and the Jesuit missionary Eusebio Francisco Kino were forced to abandon an attempted settlement and mission at La Paz because of hostilities with the native Pericúes and Guaycura.

In 1684, they moved north to the central portion of the peninsula, and selected a site for a settlement at the Cochimí settlement of Teupnon, near the mouth of a substantial arroyo about 25 kilometres (16 mi) north of the present day city of Loreto. The date was October 7, 1684, the Feast of San Bruno.

Mission work was begun with about 400 local Cochimi Indians and exploratory expeditions into the surrounding region were undertaken, including the first land crossing of the Baja California Peninsula by Europeans. However, shortages of water and imported food supplies and problems of illness forced the abandonment of San Bruno in May 1685, leaving Baja California again entirely in native hands until the first permanent Jesuit mission was established at Misión de Nuestra Señora de Loreto Conchó in 1697.

The San Bruno experience is documented in the letters and reports of Atondo, Kino, and other participants.

== Present day ==
A few crumbling walls of the uncompleted mission and fortress are all that remain of the San Bruno Mission.

== See also ==
- Missions in Baja California Sur
- San Bruno, Baja California Sur
- Spanish missions in Baja California
- List of Jesuit sites
