= Misión Santa Rosa de las Palmas =

18th-century Spanish mission in Baja California Sur, Mexico

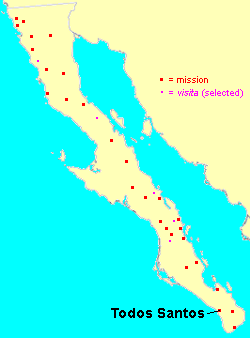

Misión Santa Rosa de las Palmas, also known as Todos Santos Mission, was founded by the Roman Catholic Jesuits in 1733 and dedicated to Saint Rose of Lima. After 1748, the mission was known as Nuestra Señora del Pilar de la Paz. The mission was the first European settlement at the site of what is now the city of Todos Santos, Baja California Sur.

The Santa Rosa Mission was located in one of the few areas of Baja California suitable for agriculture. The residents of the Mission were primarily Guaycura Native Americans (American Indians) whom the Jesuits and their successors, the Franciscans and Dominicans, attempted to convert to Christianity and to make into sedentary farm workers. Recurrent epidemics of introduced European diseases reduced the Indian population to only a handful by the 19th century and in 1825 the mission was closed.

== Foundation ==
In 1724, Jesuit priest Jaime Bravo, stationed at the Misión de Nuestra Señora del Pilar de La Paz Airapí at present day La Paz, Baja California Sur, founded a visita (subsidiary post to a mission) at a place he named Todos Santos, which was near the Pacific Ocean. In the deserts of Baja California, Todos Santos was attractive because of a relative abundance of water, tillable land, and good grazing for livestock. The site was inhabited by Uchiti Indians, probably a band of the Guaycura people. The visita became the mission of Santa Rosa in 1733 under Sigismundo Taraval.

Agriculture at Santa Rosa was successful, but the area was contested between warring bands of the Guaycura, including the Uchiti and Pericues peoples. The Uchiti, in particular, were hostile to the mission and its Christian converts (neophytes). About 10 Spanish and a few dozen neophyte soldiers attempted to protect Santa Rosa, other missions in southern Baja California, the Jesuits, and the neophytes. In addition, the Indians living at or near the mission were impacted by recurrent epidemics of European diseases such as smallpox and measles. Syphilis, although known in America before the Europeans, was also a serious disease and may have been spread widely in Baja California by visiting or castaway Spanish and English sailors.

== Destruction ==
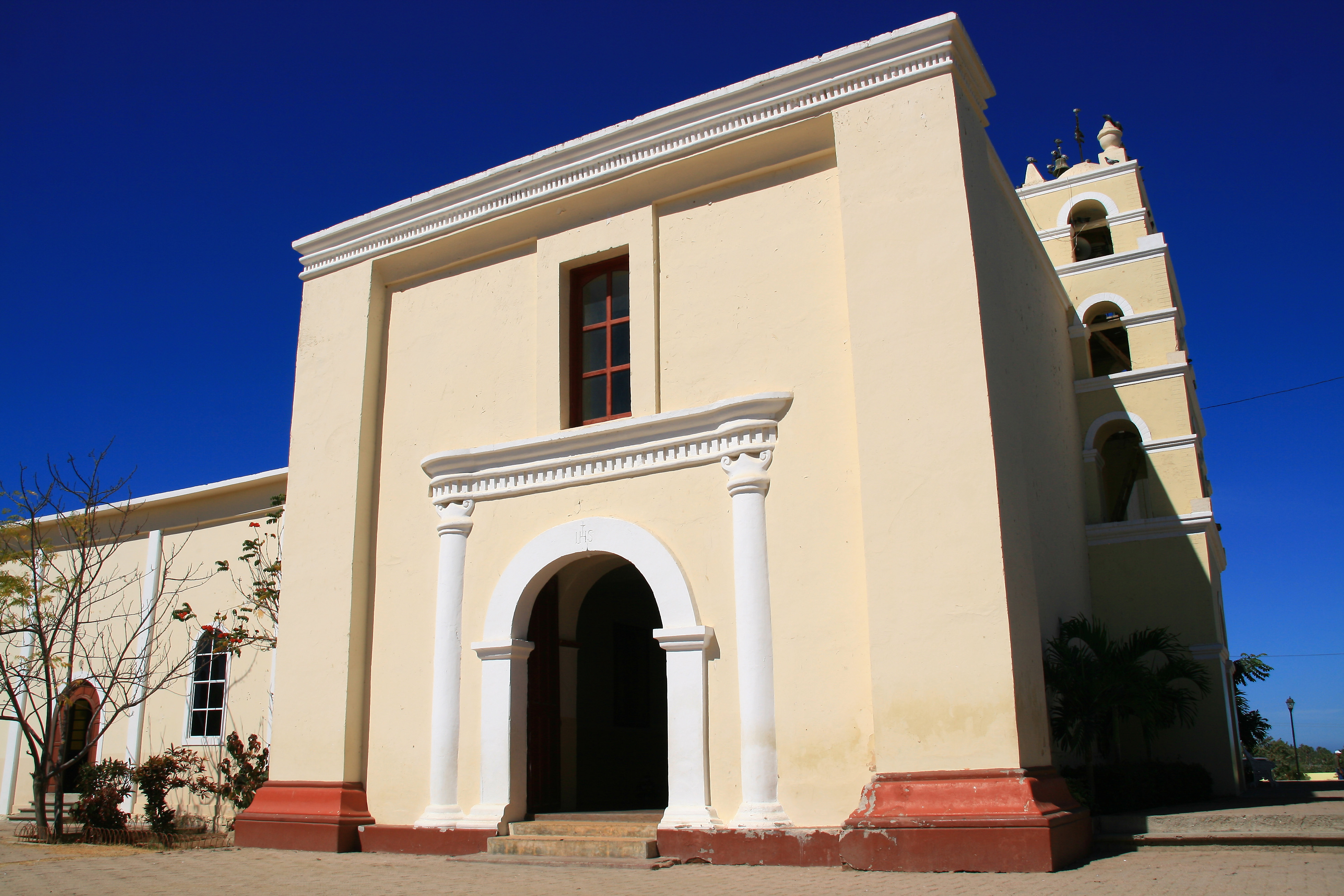
The Mission Church, part of which dates to 1747.

In 1734, the Pericue, the Uchiti, and some of the other Guaycura bands revolted in southern Baja California in an attempt to expel the Jesuits from their territory. The Indians killed Jesuits at two of the four southern missions, several Spanish soldiers, and, in January 1735, 13 sailors who had come ashore from a merchant vessel. The proximate cause of the rebellion was the Jesuit's attempt to outlaw polygamy. Taraval, a Jesuit at Santa Rosa mission, escaped. With assistance from a large Spanish and Indian military force sent from the mainland, the rebellion was mostly put down and the Todos Santos mission was reestablished in 1737 under Jesuit Bernardo Zumziel. The Uchiti, however, continued to resist until 1748.

The war and epidemics in 1742, 1744, and 1748 depopulated the south and only scattered remnants of the former Indian population remained. The surviving Guaycura from southern Baja California were congregated at the Todos Santos Mission in 1748. There, the Jesuits forcibly detained the Guaycura children at the mission and their parents and relatives "for love of the children remained pacified." A military force, independent of the Jesuits. was stationed at Todos Santos to keep the peace. The community of Spaniards, mestizos, and a diminishing number of Indians living at Todos Santos became more secular. In 1755, there were only 151 Guaycura remaining at the mission and the population continued to decline.

== Decline ==
In 1768, the population of Indians at the Santa Rosa mission had fallen to 83 due to runaways and deaths from disease. With a need for agricultural labor to work on the mission's land, the Franciscans (who had recently taken charge from the Jesuits of the Baja California missions) moved 746 Guaycura from more northerly missions to Todos Santos. These Guaycura were still semi-nomadic, and not accustomed to living in a sedentary community. Less than a year later, 300 of the Guaycura died in an epidemic of measles. Others ran away from the mission or protested by destroying or stealing mission property. By 1771 only 170 Guaycura still lived at Todos Santos and by 1808 the number had further declined to 82. At that point, the Guaycura had become almost culturally extinct. The mission was closed in 1825.

== See also ==
- Spanish missions in Baja California
- List of Jesuit sites

== Bibliography ==
- Crosby, Harry W. 1994. Antigua California: Mission and Colony on the Peninsular Frontier, 1697–1768. University of New Mexico Press, Albuquerque.
- Vernon, Edward W. 2002. Las Misiones Antiguas: The Spanish Missions of Baja California, 1683–1855. Viejo Press, Santa Barbara, California.
