= Vicente Guerrero, Baja California =

Vicente Guerrero
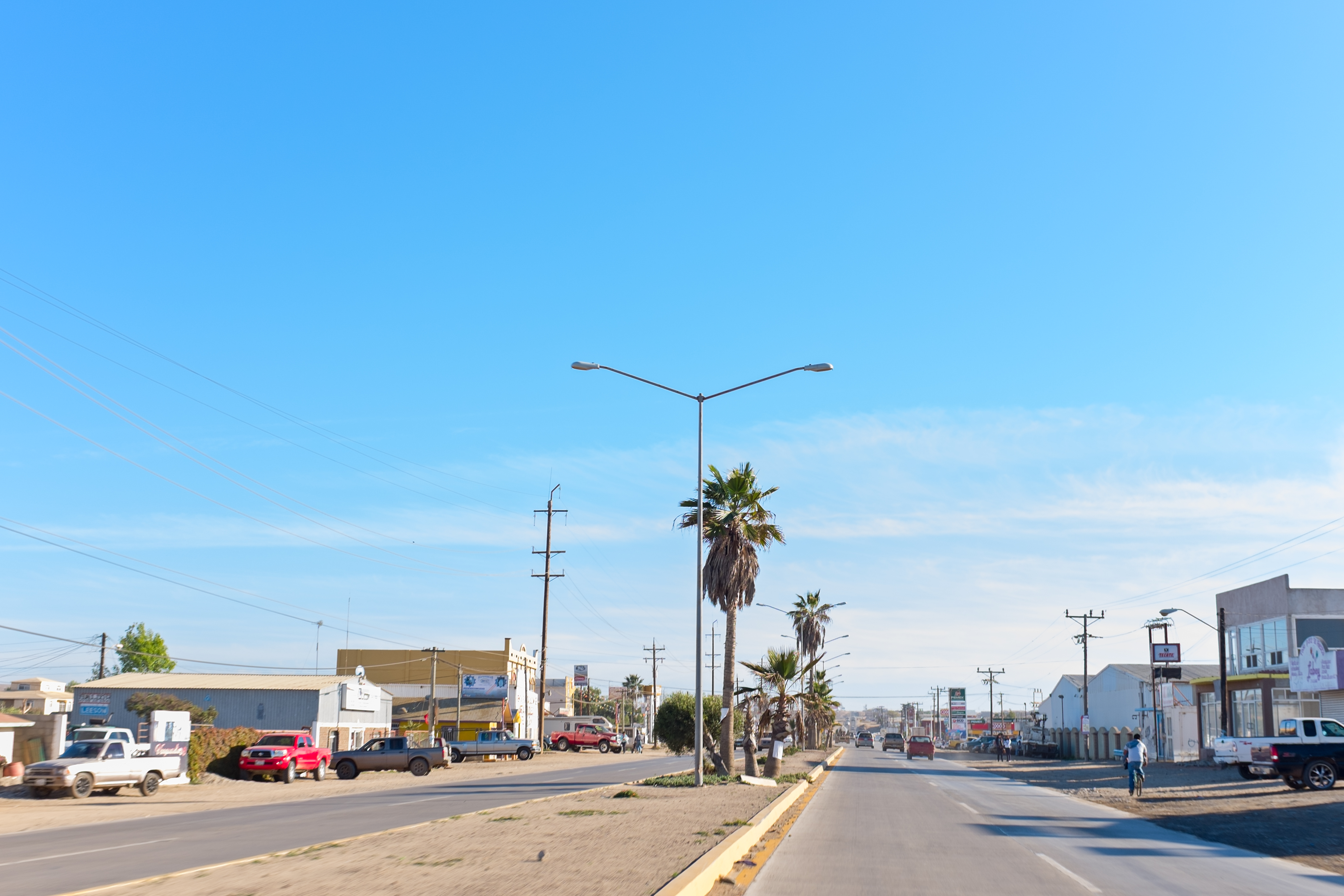

- Location in Mexico
- Coordinates: 30°43′35″N 115°59′25″W
- Country: Mexico
- State: Baja California
- Municipality: San Quintín
- Elevation: 157 ft (48 m)
- Time zone: UTC-8 (Northwest US Pacific)
  - Summer (DST): UTC-7 (Northwest)

Vicente Guerrero is a colonia located in the San Quintin Valley, Baja California, Mexico. An agricultural area, it is approximately 175 miles (282 km) south of the Tijuana/San Ysidro border checkpoint. Vicente Guerrero experiences a desert climate, and is close to the beach. There are ruins of old missions in the surrounding areas.

As of 1994, there was camping one mile south of the colonia.
