= Misión San Vicente Ferrer =

18th-century Spanish mission in Baja California, Mexico

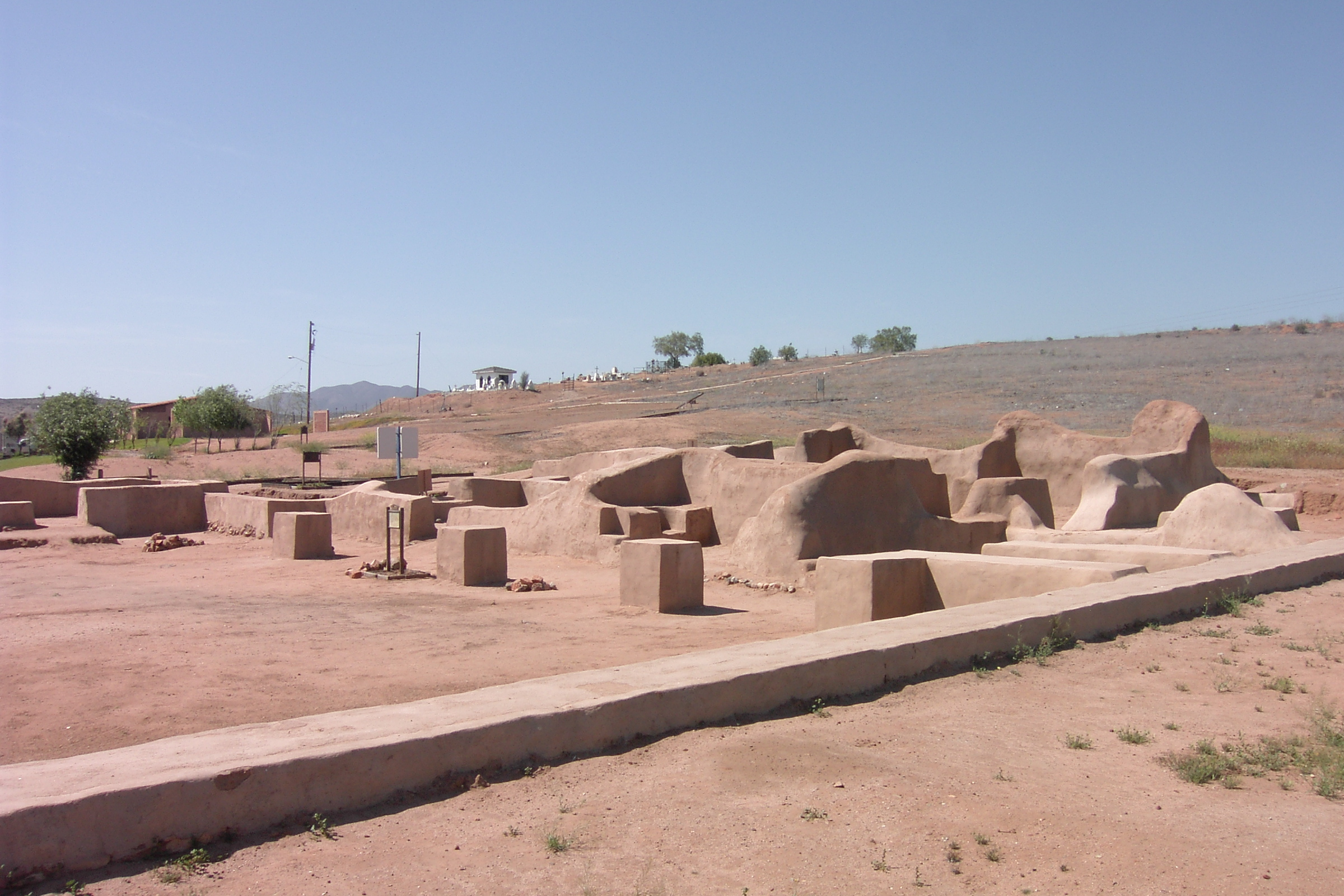
- The remains of the main mission structure

- Location in Baja California Location in Mexico
- Location: San Vicente, Baja California, Mexico
- Coordinates: 31°16′13″N 116°11′08″W
- Name as founded: Misión San Vicente Ferrer
- Patron: Vincent Ferrer
- Founded: August 1780
- Founding Order: Dominican
- Native tribe(s) Spanish name(s): Paipai

Mission San Vicente Ferrer (Spanish: Misión San Vicente Ferrer) was founded in August 1780 by the Dominican missionaries Miguel Hidalgo and Joaquin Valero among the Paipai Indians of northwestern Baja California, Mexico.

San Vicente was one of the largest and most important of the Dominican missions, because of its fertile land, abundant water, and important location on the missions' Camino Real. It may have been even more important as an early military headquarters, charged with subduing the local groups and repelling assaults from the more warlike nations on the lower Colorado River.

As at other Baja California missions, the native population diminished under the impact of Old World diseases, the political climate became less favorable to the missions under an independent Mexico after 1821, and by 1833 the mission was abandoned.

== Location and natural habitat ==
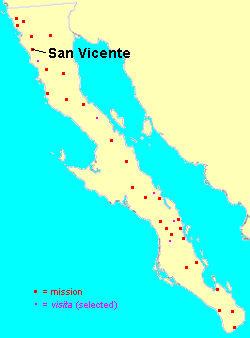
Location of Mission San Vicente among the Spanish missions in Baja California

The mission was built in a place that is now called "Llano Colorado" or "Red Plain" because of the color of the volcanic rocks there. Today this land is cultivated during certain seasons and grows wheat and barley.

Among the flora the missionaries found near the site would have been chamomile, ceanothus, yucca, mesquite, brushwood, oak, and juniper. The animals and birds that lived in the region were squirrel, mole, beaver, shrew-mouse, coyote, puma, deer, woodpeckers, white-winged doves, owl, and wild ducks, among others.

The agricultural production consisted of corn, bean, wheat, and barley crops, as well as different fruits and vegetables. The mission also had flocks of sheep and goats, herds of cattle, horses and mules.

== Missionary compound ==
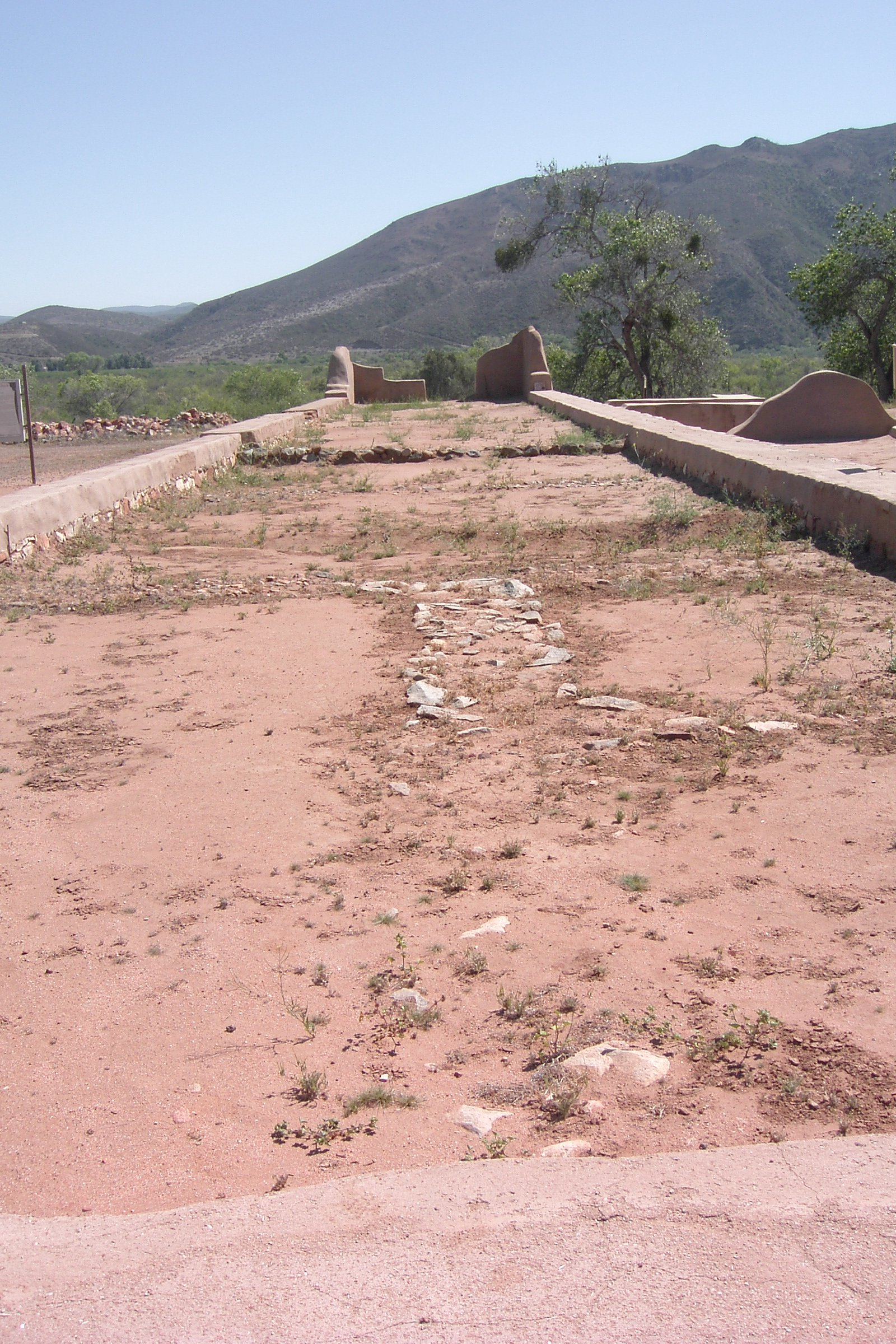
The church measured 8 x 30 meters and was the main building of the complex.

San Vicente was the largest of the Dominican establishments. The buildings were divided into two sections: one was composed of the religious center that had a church, kitchen, dining room, storage room, cells for the missionaries, and dormitories for the Native Americans. The other section was for the soldiers.

The buildings were surrounded by a wall with surveillance towers. There was also an irrigation system consisting of a dam and stone-lined ditches for watering the fields.

== Methods of construction ==
The buildings of the complex were made of adobe, with round stone foundations that were set 90 centimeters deep and cemented with a mortar of clay, sand and lime. The adobe bricks were positioned on the foundation using an alternating technique to give them strength and stability. They were bonded with the same mortar, forming walls from 0.9 to 1.1 meters thick. The adobe was made with local soil, water, clay, sand, and straw to make it more resistant. The walls probably reached a height of 4.5 meters, and the roofs were interlaced with reeds over oak beams.

== Military installation ==
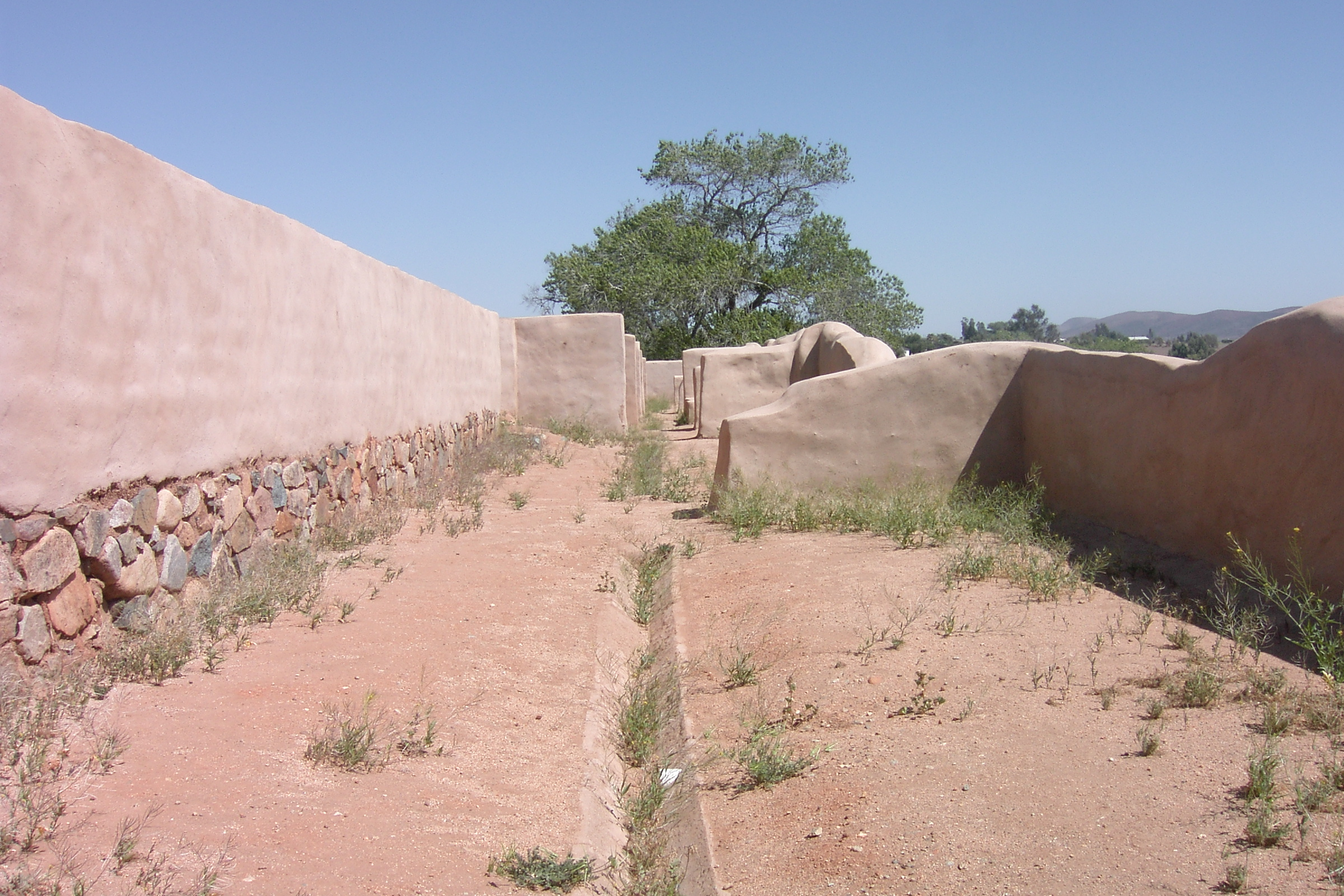
The mission jail

San Vicente was the center of operation on the Dominican missionary frontier and for that reason was protected by 12 to 25 soldiers from the Loreto presidio in what is now Baja California Sur who lived in a walled compound. The military installation was also to protect the territory between the missions of San Fernando de Velicatá and San Diego.

== Native Americans of the region ==
The San Vicente Ferrer is located in Paipai territory. This Native American group belongs to the Yuman language family, and their territory extends from the Pacific coast over mountains and deserts to the Gulf of California. Today there are 300 Paipai (or Jaspuy Paium as they call themselves) living in two communities: Santa Catarina in the Sierra Juárez and San Isidoro to the south near Trinidad Valley.

In 1782 the native population at San Vicente was estimated to be 83 converts, rising to 317 in 1787 and dropping to 246 in 1800.

== Conservation ==
Efforts to preserve and restore this site have been included in the "Camino Real Misionero de las Californias" program of Mexico's National Institute of Anthropology and History (INAH). The collapsed roofs that a group called "Pro-Rescate de los Sitios Misionales de Baja California" had placed in 1979 have been removed. The remains of the walls are covered by a sacrificial layer made of clay, sand, water, slices of nopal cactus, and manure to protect them from the wind, sunlight, and rain. Archaeological excavations were begun at the site in 1997.

== See also ==
- Spanish missions in Baja California
- Spanish missions in California
