= San Telmo, Baja California =

Town in Baja California, Mexico

San Telmo 'Maat kuñaam (Kiliwa)
- Town
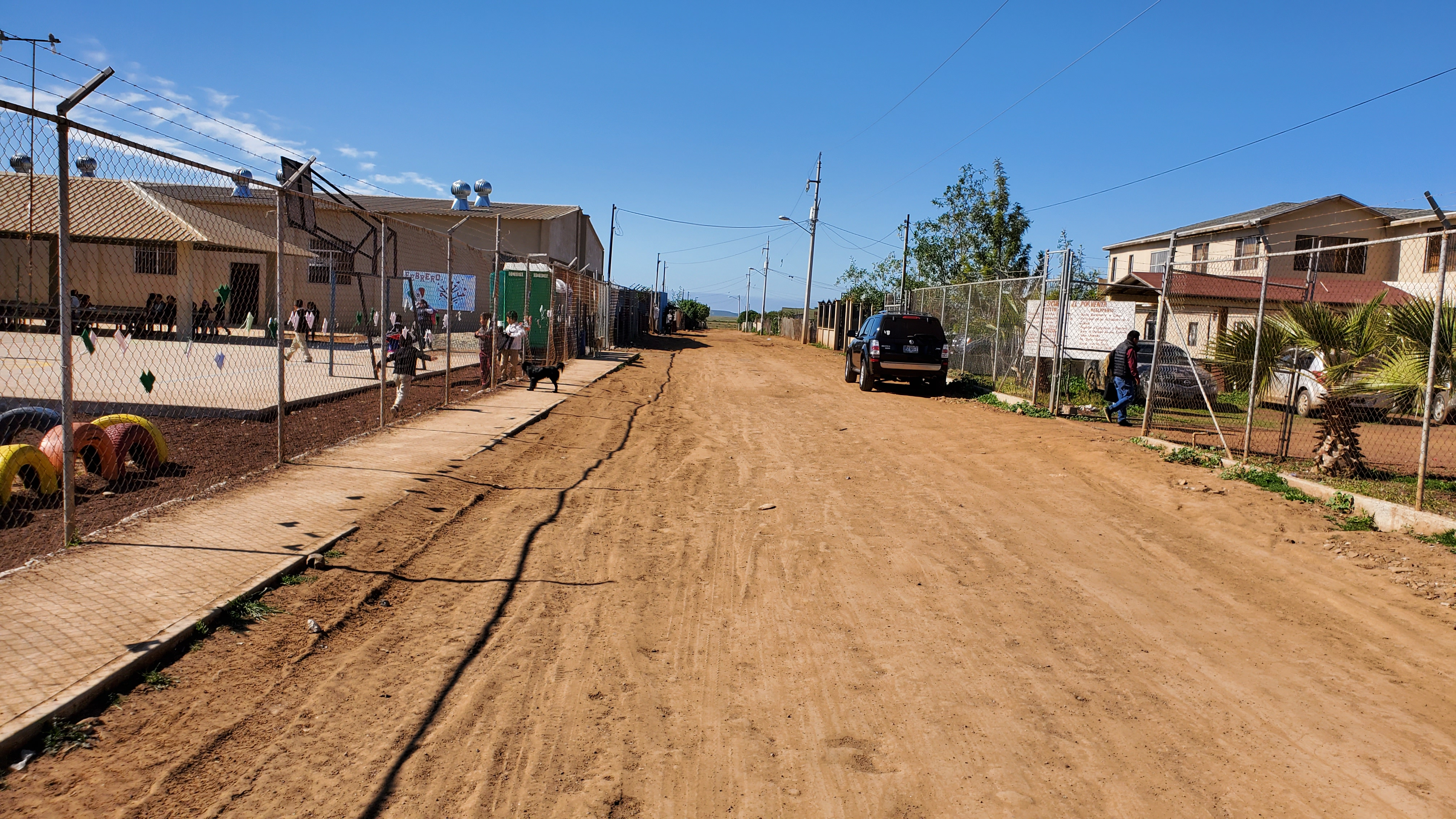
- Interactive map of San Telmo
- Coordinates: 30.9692°N 116.0913°W
- Country: Mexico
- State: Baja California

Population (2005)
  - Total: 29
- Time zone: UTC−8 (PST)
  - Summer (DST): UTC−7 (PDT)

San Telmo (Kiliwa: 'Maat kuñaam) is a town in Ensenada Municipality, Baja California, located on the Pacific Coast of Mexico. It is also a part of a region in Baja California called Héroes de Chapultepec.

== History ==
=== Labor Protest of 2015 ===
On March 17, 2015, a strike rose in the state of Ensenada. Approximately 300,000 people work in the coastal region of San Quintín and San Telmo —one of Mexico's leading export regions for crops such as strawberries, tomatoes, and cucumbers. During the protest, field laborers demanded a higher salary and government benefits such as social security and insurance. Before the protest, workers earned around 110 pesos per day with 10 hours of labor. Protestors raised up their current issues during the meeting with the representatives but granted negotiations with the Consejo Agricola de Baja California soon ended when Alberto Munoz, the representative of agribusinesses, did not return to the meeting. As a response, Fidel Sanchez, a spokesman for the Alliance of national (State and Municipal Organizations for Social Justice) —a partnership of indigenous groups representing laborers —told the agribusinesses representatives that if Munoz does not present himself, he and the protesters cannot be held accountable for what happens. United Farm Workers of America (UFW) from the United States decided to support Mexican farm laborers by circulating an online petition that was directed toward major companies such as Driscoll's.

When negotiations were not met, protestors closed down Transpeninsular Highway —the main highway that is used to export markets in California. In order to maintain stability, a myriad of soldiers and local, state, and municipal police were sent to secure the area which was nearby small cities of Mexico such as San Telmo, Camalú, and San Quintín. However, the protesters later decided to lift the roadblocks off the highway which deescalated the tension. Although some events ended in peace, some did not. One of the riot was fueled by the absence of Munoz during the negotiations meeting that was mentioned above. The ruthless combat between the protestors and the police left tens of people injured and dead from tear gas and rubber bullets. According to Justino Herera, the farmworker leader, 45 were injured and six were transported to the hospital from police attack.

Due to this violent protest, gas stations, stores, and schools, including El Porvenir Primary School(below), were closed down. Because workers were not present, harvesting paused in the greenhouses.

The strike also impacted most agribusinesses' exports but they returned to full production after a few days with little harm. Although their requests were not met, many farmers returned to work. However demands such as access to social security, combating child labor, establishing greater security measures, housing for workers, and ensuring labor rights were followed through.

== Geography ==
There are many surrounding cities that are nearby San Telmo such as San Diego and Ensenada, which are 275.4 kilometres (171.1 mi) and 143.9 kilometres (89.4 mi) from San Telmo, respectively. In addition, it is located about 244.6 kilometres (152.0 mi) from Tijuana, 60.1 kilometres (37.3 mi) from San Quintin, and 26.1 kilometres (16.2 mi) from Camalú. Although it is noticeably south of San Diego, the temperature differs greatly from day to night, ranging from 37 to 7 °C (99 to 45 °F).

== Education ==
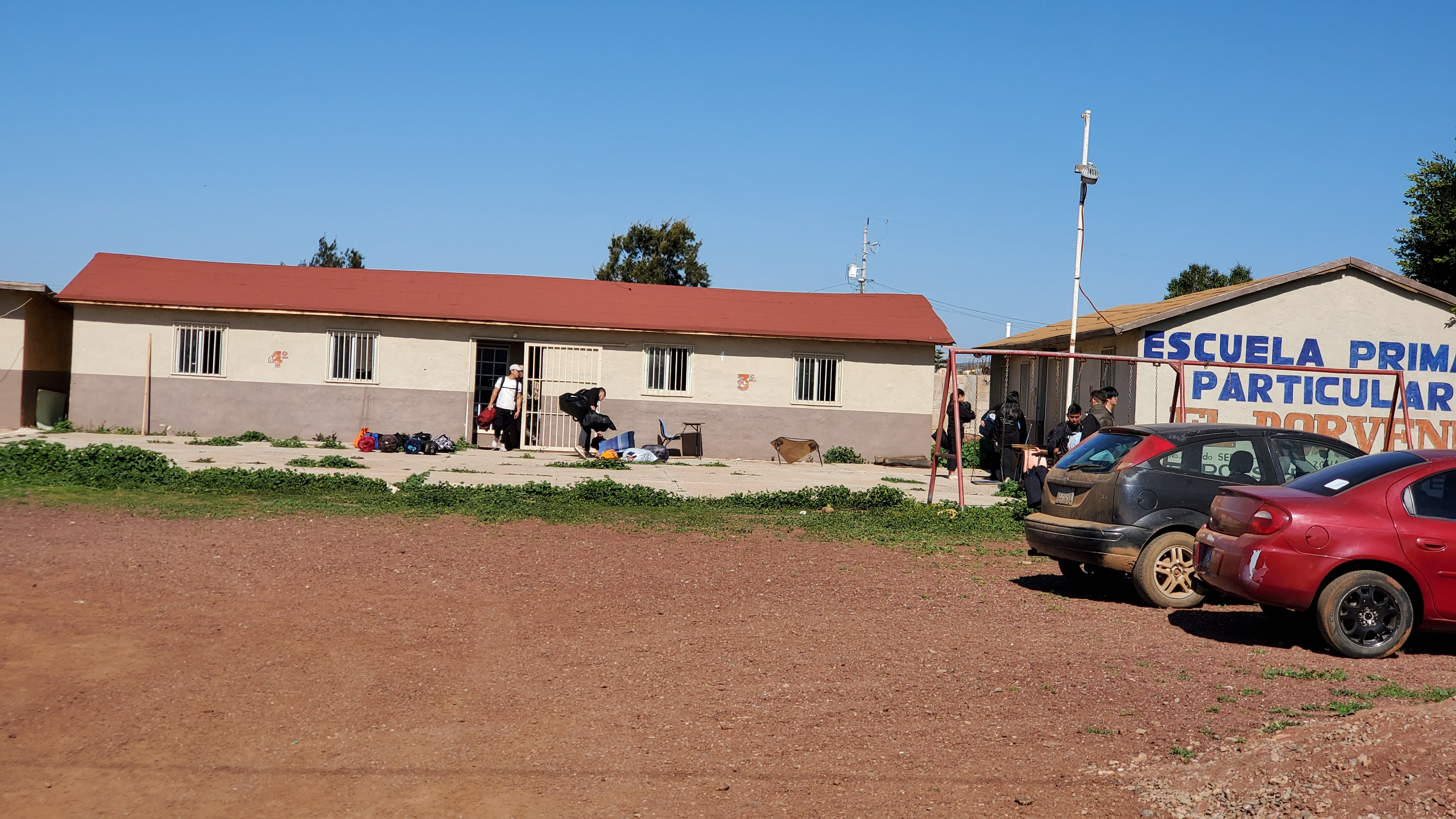
El Porvenir Primary School

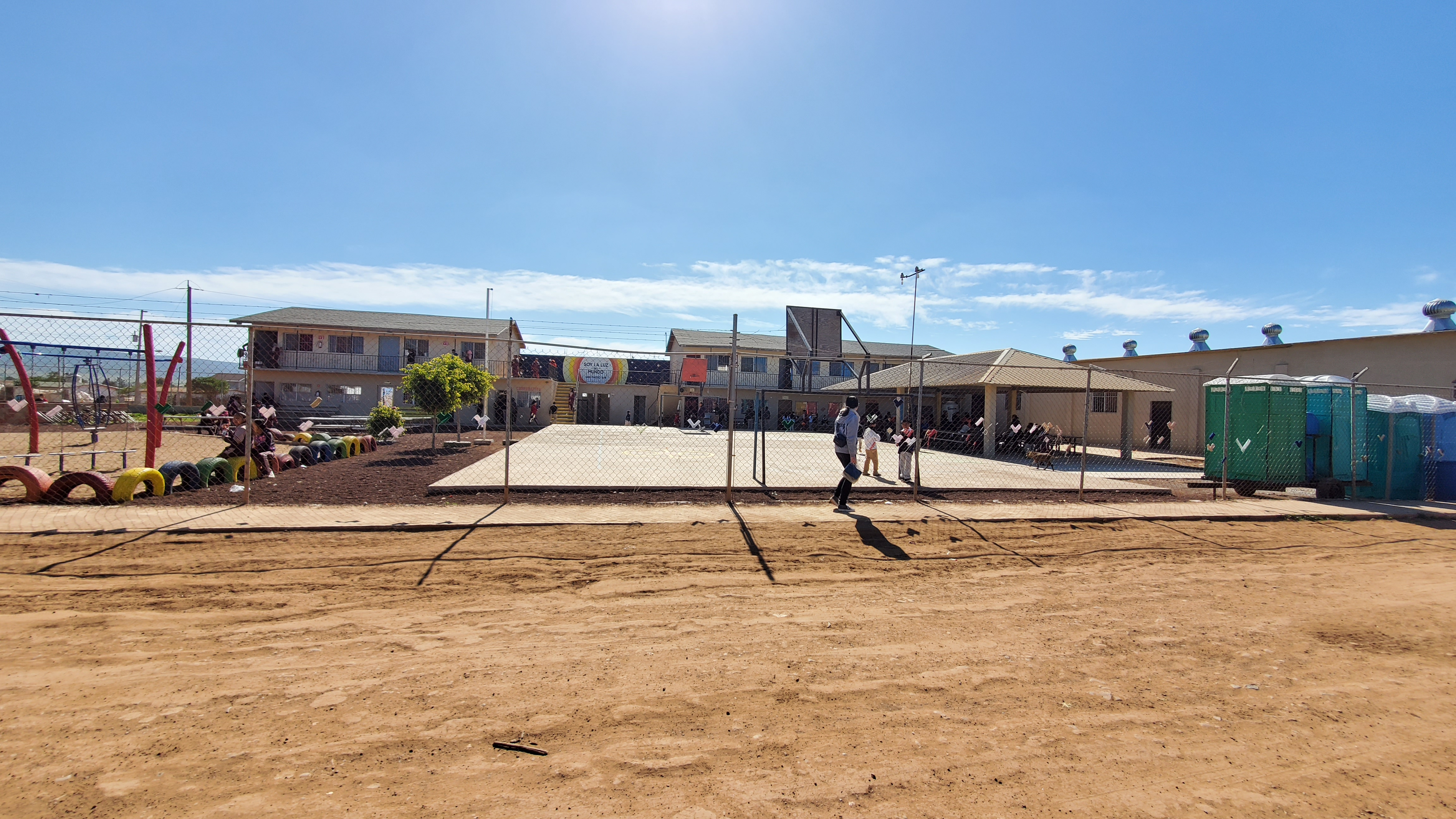
El Porvenir Secondary School

El Porvenir primary school

El Porvenir Primary School is a government certified primary school located in Heroés de Chapultec (San Telmo Community), a small rural community in Baja California, Mexico. In 2009, El Porvenir Primary School opened with a vision to raise up community leaders who will impact the larger community, by a nonprofit organization by the name of “4 Christ Mission.” Starting with 60 students, El Porvenir has been growing from then, serving 120 students in grades 1-6 as of today. Teachers of El Porvenir are certified Mexican teachers with credible teaching backgrounds and are local community members in which they serve. Every summer, a team of 30-40 college students and young adults gather together to offer an English teaching program, which includes classes such as arts and crafts, dance, religious education, and community service in order to provide a broad spectrum of education for El Porvenir students. Because of opening of El Porvenir Secondary School, the organization 4 Christ Mission has decided to merge the school together. The original Primary School is being planned to build El Porvenir High School.

El Porvenir secondary school

The secondary school consists of eight classrooms, auditorium, library, school office, basketball court, kitchen, and a school garden. The school teaches grades from 1-9. Because this school is Christian-affiliated, their education is centred around the Bible.

== Religion ==
=== San Telmo Church (Ven a Cristo Iglesia) ===
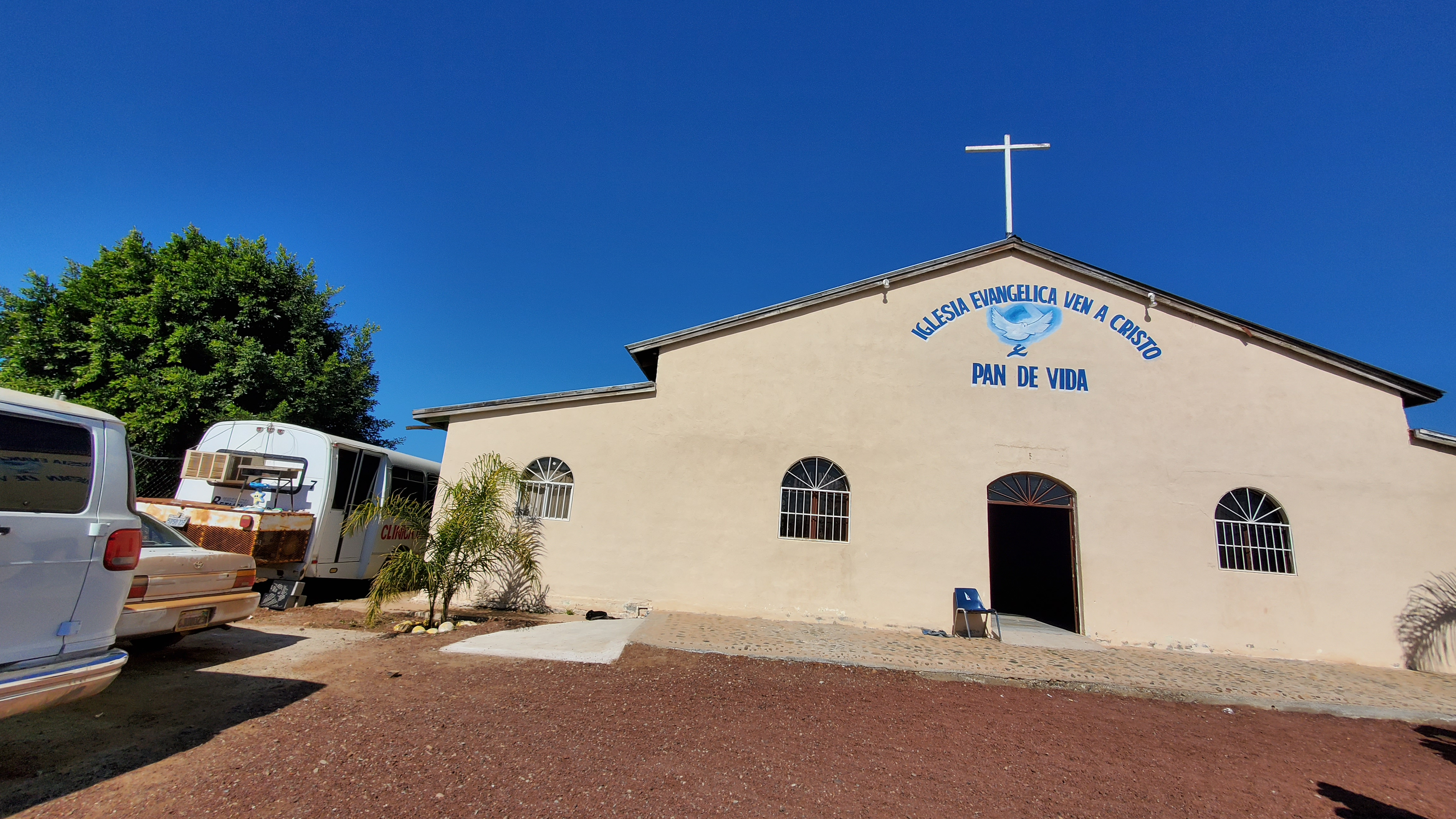
San Telmo Church

Established in 2001, San Telmo Church is known as Iglesia Ven a Cristo in San Telmo. For over ten years, Ven a Cristo has been visited by multiple church groups and individuals from Mexican community churches and the United States. Doctors and dentists also have made frequent trips to San Telmo to deliver basic medical care for local church and community members. Other church groups, youth, and individuals have spent days, weeks, and months at the mission center to share the Gospel, give out food and other basic needs to families in San Telmo. During the summer, over 400 youths from California, Connecticut, Illinois, Pennsylvania, New York and more, gather together to pray for and serve the local community for a week. All 400 people eat, sleep, and serve at Ven a Cristo Iglesia and local churches around San Telmo to serve the community with the vision and a purpose to transform the local community with the love of Christ.
