= Misión Santa Rosalía de Mulegé =

18th-century Spanish mission in Mulegé, Baja California Sur, Mexico

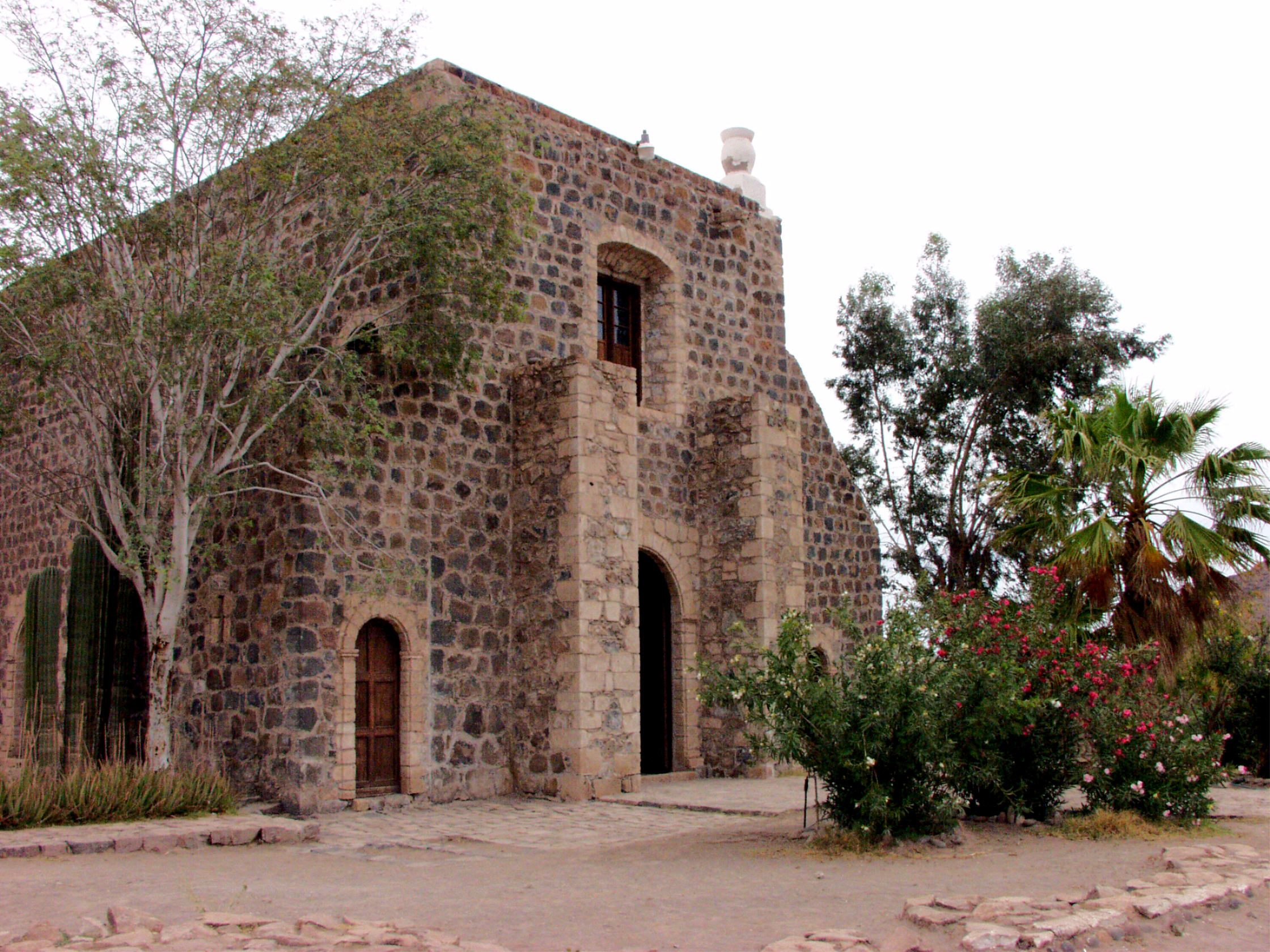
Mulegé Mission

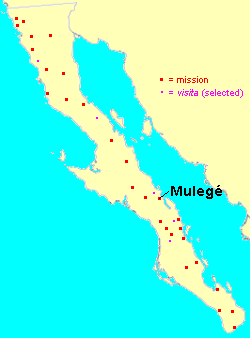
Location on the Baja California Peninsula.

Mission Santa Rosalía de Mulegé is located in the oasis of Mulegé, in Mulegé Municipality, northeastern Baja California Sur state, México. It is an Instituto Nacional de Antropología e Historia listed Cultural Heritage Monument.

== Etymology ==
The mission is named after both Saint Rosalia and the indigenous Cochimí settlement of Mulegé.

== History ==
The mission was founded in 1705 by the Jesuit missionary Juan Manuel de Basaldúa and financed by the Marqués de Villapuente at a ranchería of the local Cochimí people known as Mulegé, on the eastern Baja California Peninsula, in Viceroyalty of New Spain. The site lies near the entrance of Bahía de Concepción, on the coast of the Gulf of California.

A hurricane in 1717 devastated the agricultural fields that supported the original settlement.

Construction of a stone church was begun in 1766. In 1768, when the Franciscans took over responsibility for colonial Baja California from the Jesuits, there were reportedly still some 300 Cochimí neophytes kept at Mulegé. However, by 1770, the mission was virtually deserted. The Dominicans, who succeeded the Franciscans in Baja in 1773, began rebuilding, but the population remained less than 100.

The mission ceased to function in 1828. The present church buildings have been extensively restored.

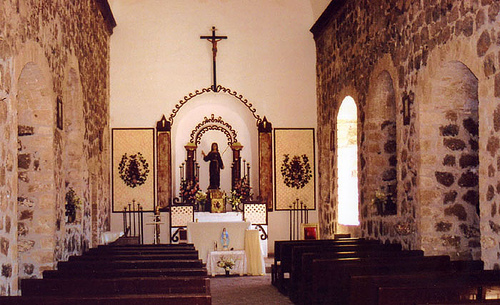
Mission interior.

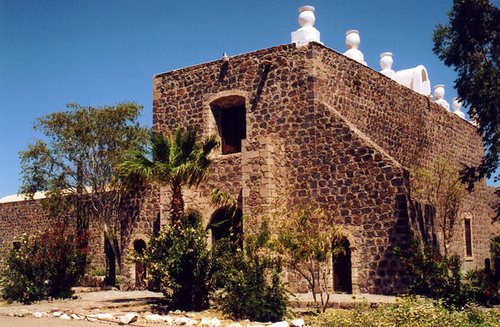
Stone facade and buttress.

== See also ==
- Spanish missions in Baja California
- Spanish missions in California
- List of Jesuit sites
