= Juan María de Salvatierra =

Catholic Missionary

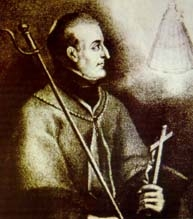
Salvatierra, S.J.

Juan María de Salvatierra, S.J., (November 15, 1648 – July 17, 1717) was a Catholic missionary to the Americas.

== Life history ==
Salvatierra was born Gianmaria Salvatierra in Milan, then the capital of the Duchy of Milan, a part of the Holy Roman Empire. His father was of Spanish origin, and his mother was Italian. He studied in the Jesuit college of Parma. It was there that he accidentally came across a book on the "Indian missions," which fascinated him. He entered the Jesuit Order in Genoa and in 1675, he sailed for the Viceroyalty of New Spain, present-day Mexico. There, he further studied theology, and was for several years professor of rhetoric in the College of the Holy Spirit in Puebla.

Declining a position in the cathedral, he received permission to devote himself to the conversion of the indigenous people of southwestern North America, and in June 1680, set out for the lands of the Tarahumara people in the mountains of Chihuahua. He lived among them for 10 years, founding several Catholic missions along the way. He was subsequently appointed visitor of the Spanish missions in the Sonoran Desert in the Sonora y Sinaloa Province of the Real Audiencia of Guadalajara in New Spain (Mexico). While there he formed a project for the "spiritual conquest" of Baja California, as all the military expeditions to that region of Las Californias had been without success.

Soon afterwards, through conversations with the missionary explorer Eusebio Kino, he conceived an intense desire for the evangelization of the Baja California peninsula, for which undertaking official authority was finally granted in 1697, with all expenses borne by the missionaries. After obtaining permission from his superiors, he sailed on 10 October 1697 for the Baja California region of Las Californias Province, to found the Spanish missions in Baja California chain.

With one small boat's crew and six soldiers, Salvatierra landed on 15 October 1697 at Bahía Concepción, on the coast of the Baja Peninsula, and a few days later, on 19 October, he laid the foundation of Misión Nuestra Señora de Loreto, the first of the Baja California missions, which he dedicated to Our Lady of Loreto, his special patroness through life. For a time he acted as priest, captain, sentry, and cook, besides studying the languages from a vocabulary prepared by earlier Jesuit missionaries Eusebio Kino and Juan Copart, and from indigenous people who could be induced to come near.

He soon mastered an indigenous language, and in seven years established six other missions along the Baja California coast. He also made some important explorations. In the organization and later conduct of the work his chief collaborator was Juan de Ugarte. The contributions for this purpose formed the basis of the historic Fondo Piadoso, or Pious Fund of the Californias. (Later, it was a subject of controversy between the republican government of Mexico and the U.S.)

In 1704, he was appointed Provincial Superior of the Society, and resided in Mexico, but when his term was concluded in 1707, he returned to his missions in Baja.

In 1717, he was called to the capital by the Viceroy Baltasar de Zúñiga y Guzmán, to provide material for a history of California which King Philip V had ordered to be written. Although suffering from illness, Salvatierra obeyed, and, crossing the Gulf of California (Sea of Cortez), continued his voyage along the coast until he arrived in and died at the colonial city of Guadalajara in the Kingdom of New Galicia. The whole city assembled at his funeral, and the remains were deposited amidst ceremonies rarely seen at the burial of a Jesuit missionary, in the chapel which he had erected to the Lady of Loreto.

He wrote Cartas sobre la Conquista espiritual de Californias (1698) and Nuevas cartas sobre Californias (1699), which have been used by Miguel Venegas in his Historia de Californias, and his Relaciones (1697–1709) in Documentos para la Historia de Mexico (1853–7).

Salvatierra is still known as "the Apostle of California", a title he shares with Franciscan friar Junípero Serra, who founded many of the Spanish missions in Alta California.

== Monuments and memorials ==
Salvatierra Walk at Stanford University is named for Salvatierra.

Salvatierra Crater in the El Pinacate y Gran Desierto de Altar Biosphere Reserve is named for Salvatierra in his honor and another crater is named in honor of Eusebio Kino for their 1701 exploration of the region.

== See also ==
- Spanish missions in Baja California
- Spanish missions in Alta California
- Alta California
