= Isidoro de Atondo y Antillón =

Spanish admiral

Isidro de Atondo y Antillón (baptized 3 December 1639) was a Spanish admiral, who is best known for his role in unsuccessful attempts to establish colonies on the Baja California peninsula in 1683–1685.

== Biography ==
Atondo was born in Valtierra, in the Navarra region of Spain, to noble parents. Baptized in 1639, he began his military service in 1658, fighting in several European campaigns, both on land and at sea. After coming to the New World in 1669, Atondo was named governor and captain general of Sinaloa in the Internal Provinces of northwestern New Spain in 1676. In 1678, he was charged with leading a well-financed effort to establish a Spanish presence on the Baja California peninsula, where intermittent attempts since the 1530s had uniformly ended in failure.

Accompanied by the Jesuit missionaries Eusebio Francisco Kino and Matías Goñi, Atondo sailed to La Paz in April 1683. Efforts to establish a settlement among the Pericú and Guaycura of the La Paz area ended with the Spanish soldiers becoming embroiled in hostilities with the natives. La Paz was abandoned, and the Spanish moved north to try again at San Bruno among the Cochimí north of Loreto in December 1683.

Atondo's second attempt at colonization was more peaceful, longer-lasting, and more fruitful in geographical exploration than the first. However, it, too, came to an unsuccessful conclusion when the settlement proved unable to sustain itself and had to be abandoned in May 1685. The consequences of the Atondo expeditions included a reluctance on the part of the Spanish government to be drawn again into the expensive and unproductive task of colonizing Baja California, but also an enthusiasm on the part of Kino and other Jesuits to develop this mission field.

Atondo subsequently served in Nueva Vizcaya, New Spain and Oaxaca, and he was received into the Order of Santiago in 1689.
