= Misión La Purísima Concepción de Cadegomó =

18th-century Spanish mission in Baja California Sur, Mexico

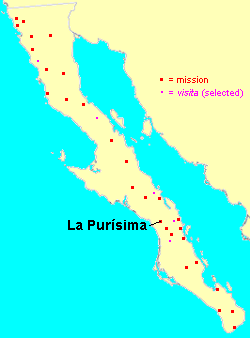

Mission La Purísima, was founded west of Loreto in Baja California Sur, by the Jesuit missionary Nicolás Tamaral in 1720 and financed by the Marqués de Villapuente de la Peña and his wife the Marquesa de las Torres de Rada.

By 1735 it had been moved to a new location at the Cochimí ranchería known as Cadegomó, meaning "arroyo of the carrizos", about 30 kilometers south of the original site. The mission was dedicated to the Immaculate Conception.

The mission was abandoned in 1822.

In the early twentieth century, the church was still in use, but by the start of the following century only a few traces of structures remained.

== See also ==
- Missions in Baja California Sur
- List of Jesuit sites
