= La Reforma (caldera) =

Pilo-Pleistocene caldera in Baja California

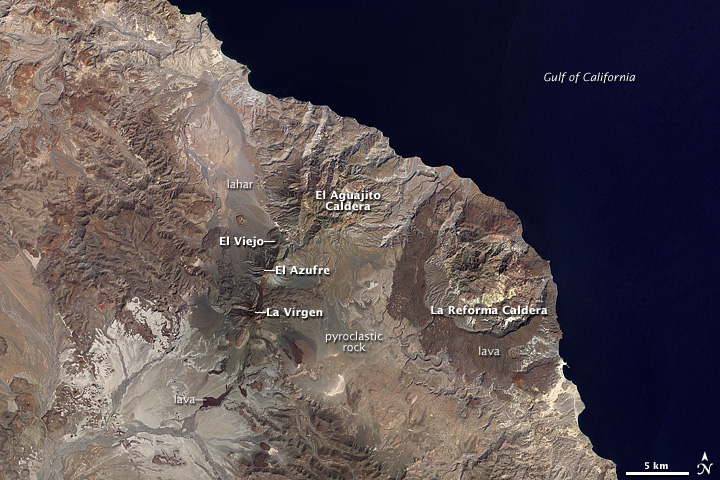
- The caldera of La Reforma and neighbouring volcanoes

Highest point
- Elevation: 1,200 m (3,900 ft)
- Coordinates: 27°30′28.8″N 112°23′31.2″W

Geography
- Location within Baja California Sur Location within Mexico
- Location: Baja California Sur, Mexico

Geology
- Rock age: Plio-Pleistocene
- Mountain type: Caldera
- Last eruption: Pleistocene (0.6 Ma)

La Reforma is a Plio-Pleistocene caldera on the Baja California Peninsula in Mexico. It is part of eleven volcanoes in Baja California, which formed with the Gulf of California during the Miocene, about ten million years ago. Previously, a volcanic arc had existed on the peninsula. The caldera's basement consists of granites and monzonites, formed between the Cretaceous and the Middle Miocene.

The caldera has a diameter of 10 kilometres (6.2 mi) and is surrounded by a rim 100 to 500 metres (330 to 1,640 ft) high; its highest point is 1,200 metres (3,900 ft) high above sea level. The formation of the caldera was accompanied by the eruption of a 5–10 cubic kilometres (1.2–2.4 cu mi) ignimbrite. After the eruption, volcanic activity continued in and around the caldera, forming lava domes, lava flows and a resurgent dome that rises 700 metres (2,300 ft) above the caldera margin.

Other volcanoes in the area include El Aguajito and Tres Virgenes.

== Geography and structure ==
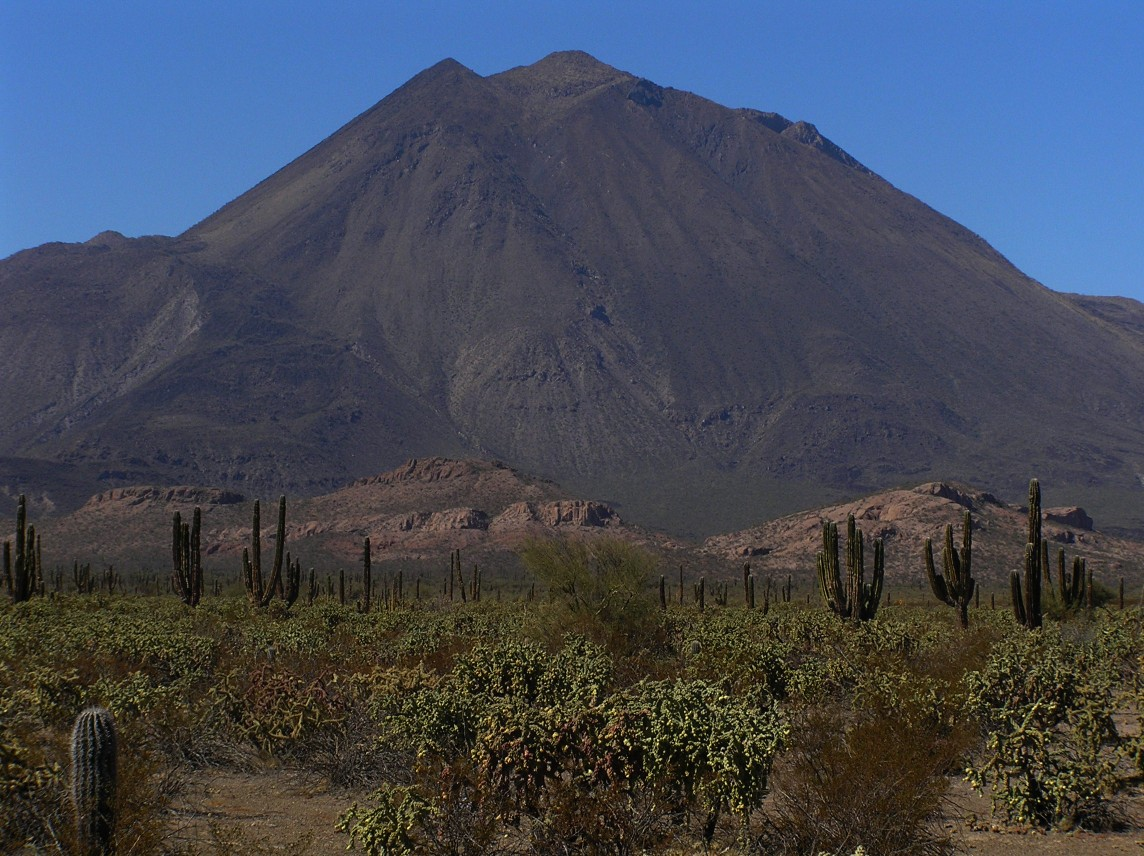
El Virgen, one of the three Virgenes volcanoes to the west of La Reforma

La Reforma is located in the municipality Mulegé, in east-central Baja California, Mexico, just south of the frontier between the departments Baja California and Baja California Sur, and 20 kilometres (12 mi) north of Santa Rosalía. Other volcanic centres in the neighbourhood are Tres Virgenes and El Aguajito (first identified as "Santa Ana caldera" in 1984), west of La Reforma. Offshore east of La Reforma lies the Virgenes High, a submarine elevated platform, probably associated with basaltic intrusions at the intersection of two volcanic ridges. Isla Tortuga, a volcanic island formed on a fracture zone, is also to the east of La Reforma.

The La Reforma caldera has a diameter of 10 kilometres (6.2 mi), and the height of its rim ranges from 100 to 500 metres (330 to 1,640 ft). It is a semicircular structure around Cabo Virgenes, which reaches the Gulf of California at La Reforma in the northwest and Punta Las Cuevas in the southeast. A tectonic block inside the caldera rises 700 metres (2,300 ft) above the rim of the caldera; it is a resurgent dome formed by welded tuff. The highest point of the dome is 1,200 metres (3,900 ft).

Alternative theories are that La Reforma is a dome which was eroded to form a circular pattern or a set of tectonic blocks. Although the dome was thought to be formed by the older Comondú volcanics, it appears to be a product of La Reforma activity.

== Geology ==
La Reforma is one of 11 volcanic centres in Baja California. In addition to La Reforma-Tres Virgenes, the other centres are Cerro Prieto, El Pinacate, the San Quintin volcanic field, the Puertecitos volcanic province, San Luis Island, the Jaraguay volcanic field, the San Borja volcanic field, Punta Púlpito, the Mencenares volcanic complex and La Purísima.

Subduction of the Guadalupe Plate/Farallon Plate beneath Baja California was prevalent in the region until 12,5–11 million years ago; volcanic activity since then is due to tectonic changes associated with the development of the Gulf of California. Earlier subduction-related volcanism during the Miocene formed the volcanic deposits of the Comondú Group.

When subduction was active, it triggered the formation of andesitic rocks known as "Andesite of Sierra Santa Lucía" in the area around La Reforma. These are the local manifestations of Comondú Group volcanics from activity occurring 24 to 13 million years ago. The last subduction-related volcanism, producing Santa Rosalía dacite, was between 13 and 12 million years ago. Subsequently, rifting in the Santa Rosalía Basin was accompanied by volcanism which laid down the basalts-basaltic andesite of the Boleo Formation (11-9 million years ago), the El Morro tuff (9-8 million years ago) and the Cerro San Lucas unit (9.5–7.7 million years ago).

Volcanism in the area is linked to the formation of the Santa Rosalía Basin, expressed as the Gulf of California, about ten million years ago as part of the tectonic activity of the Basin and Range Province. The gulf's formation was accompanied by volcanic activity, calc-alkaline at first and later alkaline and tholeiitic. Interaction between the San Andreas Fault and the East Pacific Rise triggered the formation of a transform boundary in the gulf 3.5 million years ago. Baja California is currently moving northwest at a rate of 5.6 centimetres per year (2.2 in/year). As part of this movement of the Earth's tectonic plates, the Santa Rosalía Basin formed through crustal extension and was filled by a number of Miocene-Pleistocene layers of rock, some of which are exposed in La Reforma. The basin's formation was influenced by faults running northwest to southeast, and other fault systems are also active in the area.

=== Rocks ===
Based on outcrop analysis, the crystalline basement composed of granitic and monzonitic rocks, dates to the Cretaceous, the oldest dated sample being 91.2 ± 2 million years old. This rock, a granite, may be part of a plutonic basement. Younger basement rocks comprise Miocene marine sediments and volcanics pertaining to the Comondú Group. Andesite of Sierra Santa Lucía is found west-southwest of the Santa Rosalía Basin. The basaltic La Esperanza formation is also in the area.

Age	Formation	Lithologies	Notes
Holocene		Fluvial sediments	
Late Pleistocene	Volcanics	Basaltic cones	
Middle Pleistocene	Volcanics	Rhyolitic lava flows	
Early Pleistocene	Volcanics	Ignimbrites and pantellerite tuff	
Pliocene	Volcanics	Ash and pumice flows, basaltic dykes	
Late Miocene		Marine sediments	
Middle to Late Miocene	Comondú Group	Andesite lava flows	
Early to Middle Miocene	Comondú Group	Andesite breccia	
Oligocene to Early Miocene	Comondú Group	Fluvial sandstones and conglomerates, felsic tuffs	
Cretaceous	Crystalline basement	Granites & monzonites	

=== Composition ===
Lava flow deposits are composed of andesite, basalt and dacite and lava domes consist of rhyolite. Plagioclase, apatite, magnetite and zirconia are the common mineral components of the rocks. The most common minerals in the ignimbrites are feldspar and clinopyroxene, while fayalite is rare. In addition to these minerals, the youngest rocks are andesites which contain amphibole. The area contains well-known copper- and manganese-bearing resources in marine sediments that were deposited during the Pliocene. Zinc and cobalt concentrations in the minerals surrounding La Reforma range from 242 to 38,847 and 22 to 17,407 ppm respectively. Some rocks of Pliocene were erupted in a submarine environment and have been converted into palagonite, which has a glassy structure.

The La Reforma volcanic rocks feature an anomalous chemistry resembling the calc-alkaline magma series, even though La Reforma is not a subduction zone volcano. This is consistent with the geochemistry of nearby Tres Virgenes, although one pyroclastic flow at La Reforma was considered peralkaline.

== Climate ==
The climate is arid; average precipitation in the area is 60 millimetres (2.4 in) per year, 40.6 millimetres (1.60 in) of which falls in winter. Most precipitation falls on Tres Virgenes. In Santa Rosalia, average temperatures range from 16.5 °C (61.7 °F) in January to 30.8 °C (87.4 °F) in August.

The area was probably more humid during winter in the Pleistocene and certainly colder; oxygen isotope ratios of Tres Virgenes waters indicate that temperatures during the time of the Wisconsin glaciation were 5–7 °C (9.0–12.6 °F) colder than today.

== Eruptive history ==
Volcanism at La Reforma began during the Pliocene, with ash flows and subaqueous pumice flows. Later activity became subaerial and generated pillow lava. Of the local volcanoes, La Reforma was the first to emerge from the sea. Four to five million years ago, basaltic dykes formed. Volcanic activity at La Reforma occurred between 1.6 and 1.4 million years ago, and at least four ignimbrites have been found there.

A major ignimbrite-forming eruption occurred during the Early Pleistocene, with the formation of pantellerite tuff. The eruption covered about 200 square kilometres (77 sq mi) with 5–10 cubic kilometres (1.2–2.4 cu mi) of ignimbrite. The ignimbrite is rich in fiamme. Andesitic effusive activity occurred on the flanks of the caldera before and after its collapse.

Activity after the caldera's formation created lava domes and rhyolitic lava flows along its ring faults. One flow was dated at 1,090,000 ± 110,000 years old, and the domes are 1.4 to 1.2 million years old. La Reforma eruption products were later partially buried by activity from El Aguajito, where volcanic activity had migrated to. Basaltic cones which erupted 600,000 years ago on the caldera's flanks despite their location are not part of the La Reforma volcano; like Isla Tortuga and Tres Virgenes, they are controlled by the tectonic processes that accompanied the rifting of the Sea of Cortez. Also, rivers deposited sediments inside the caldera itself. Seismic activity still occurs at Tres Virgenes volcano. La Reforma could still experience large scale explosive volcanism, especially in its southwestern part.

Resurgent doming occurred in the centre of the caldera, causing Miocene-age rocks (including diorites) to be exposed at its centre. A combination between this doming and uplift of the surrounding land of the Baja California peninsula raised Pleistocene sea deposits to over 300 metres (980 ft). The average pace of the uplift is 240 millimetres per millennium (9.4 in/ka). Hot springs exist in the area and the chemical and isotope characteristics indicate that a small amount of their water comes from magma, implying that a magma chamber still exists beneath La Reforma. Temperatures of the hot springs range from 21 to 98 °C (70 to 208 °F). Geothermal energy has been harnessed from Tres Virgenes for over ten years; currently, in Baja California Cerro Prieto and Tres Virgenes are the principal sources for geothermal energy, but a number of other sites on the peninsula could be used in the future for power generation.
