= Baja California peninsula =

Peninsula on the Pacific coast of Mexico

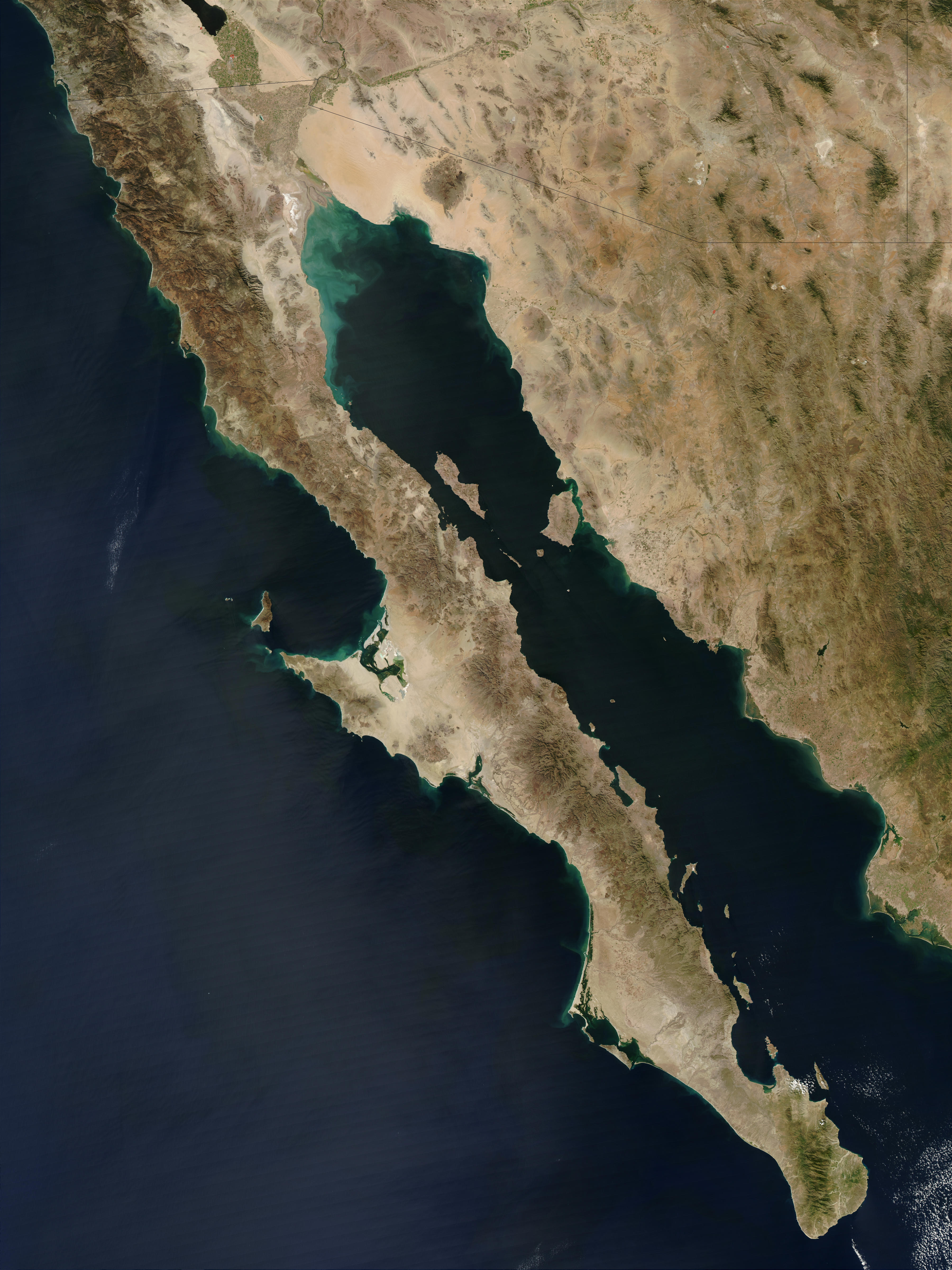
- Satellite image of the Baja California peninsula
- Interactive map of Baja California peninsula

Geography
- Location: Northern Mexico
- Coordinates: 28°00′N 113°30′W
- Adjacent to: Pacific Ocean; Gulf of California
- Area: 143,390 km^{2} (55,360 sq mi)

Administration
- Mexico
- States: Baja California; Baja California Sur

Demographics
- Population: 4,567,467 (2020)

The Baja California peninsula (Spanish: Península de Baja California, lit. 'Lower California peninsula') is a peninsula in northwestern Mexico. It separates the Gulf of California from the Pacific Ocean. The peninsula extends from Mexicali, Baja California, in the north to Cabo San Lucas, Baja California Sur, in the south.

With a length of 1,247 km (775 miles), its width ranges from 40 km (25 miles) at its narrowest to 320 km (200 miles) at its widest point and has approximately 3,000 km (1,900 miles) of coastline and approximately 65 islands. The total area of the Baja California peninsula is 143,390 km^{2} (55,360 sq mi).

The peninsula is separated from mainland Mexico by the Gulf of California and the Colorado River. There are four main desert areas on the peninsula: the San Felipe Desert, the Central Coast Desert, the Vizcaíno Desert, and the Magdalena Plain Desert.

== History ==
The name of California existed as a myth among European explorers before it was discovered. The earliest known mention of the idea of California was in the 1510 romance novel Las Sergas de Esplandián by Spanish author Garci Rodríguez de Montalvo. The book described the Island of California as being west of the Indies, "very close to the side of the Terrestrial Paradise; and it is peopled by black women, without any man among them, for they live in the manner of Amazons".

The Baja peninsula was originally believed by the first Spanish sea explorers to be an island, and acquired the name California, after the mythical paradise. Following Hernán Cortés's conquest of Mexico, the search for the fabled Strait of Anián connecting the Atlantic to the Pacific helped motivate him to send several expeditions to the west coast of New Spain in the 1530s and early 1540s. In 1539, explorer Francisco de Ulloa proved that Baja California was a peninsula rather than an island, and named the water separating it from the mainland the "Vermillion Sea" (sometimes referred to as the "Red Sea"). The Spaniards gave the name Las Californias to the peninsula and lands to the north, including both Baja California and Alta California, the region that became parts of the present-day U.S. states of California, Nevada, Utah, Arizona, and parts of Colorado and Wyoming. Over time the name "Sea of Cortez" replaced Vermillion Sea, and today the term "Gulf of California" is used by some.

Although cartographers such as Abraham Ortelius showed the Baja as an extensive peninsula in his Theatrum Orbis Terrarum, published in Antwerpen in 1589, and on the map Maris Pacifici from 1589, in the first half of the 17th century the idea of California as an island spread again; this persisted well into the 18th century, and was included in many erroneous maps that did not have the knowledge of the Spanish sailors about the Pacific coast of North America. It is believed to have originated with Carmelite friar Antonio Ascension, who around 1620 drew a map of California depicting it as an island, supposedly on a misconception of reports by Spanish navigators Juan de Fuca and Martin d'Aquilar. A copy of this map was sent to Spain and was seized by the Dutch on its way and then reproduced in the Netherlands, and eventually found its way to Henry Briggs in London who widely disseminated this misinformation. The first printed map showing California as an island was published by Briggs in 1622 (this map was also included in Hakluytus Posthumus by Samuel Purchas, 1625), where it was written that it was sometimes supposed to be a peninsula, but had since been shown by the Dutch to be an island. The idea was warmly accepted by cartographers and presented even in c. 1720 on Carte Nouveelle de la Mer du Sud, published in Amsterdam by Andries and Hendrik de Leth. Garcia and Jorge opined in 2023 that a reason for such a mistake could have originated in the secret in which the Spaniards held their cartography from other European powers' eyes.

The final blow to the notion of California as an island was struck by an influential map created by Italian Jesuit priest Eusebio Kino during his mission in the Pimería Alta. It was titled Paso por tierra a la California y sus confinantes nuevas Naciones y Misiones nuevas de la Compañía de JHS [Jesús] en la América Septentrional ("Overland Passage to California and its Contiguous New Nations and New Missions of the Society of Jesus in Northern America"). Originally, in 1695, it depicted California as a peninsula but based on the presence of blue abalone shells (most likely Haliotis fulgens) from the Pacific coast in the Pimería Alta, the information from natives, and his own travels and sightings, Eusebio Kino redrew the map in 1701. The map was printed in 1707 in Hamburg and Leipzig and became one of the best-known maps of northern New Spain. A notable colleague of Eusebio Kino who accompanied him on one of his major travels (in 1694) and acted as the intermediary in the publication of this map and dissemination of Kino's knowledge in Europe was Carniolan priest Marcus Antonius Kappus.

=== Timeline ===
- "At the time of contact, Baja California Norte was primarily inhabited by several indigenous groups belonging to the Yuman language branch of the Hokan linguistic family." Other indigenous groups in Baja California at the time of first contact include the Paipai, Kumeyaay (Kumiai), Cochimí, Cucapás (Cocopá), Kiliwa, Guaycura (Guaicura or Waicuri), and Pericú peoples.
- 1532: Hernán Cortés sends three ships north along the coast of Mexico in search of the Island of California. The three ships disappear without a trace.
- 1533: Cortés sends a follow-up mission to search for the lost ships. Pilot Fortún Ximénez leads a mutiny and founds a settlement in the Bay of La Paz in today's Baja California before being killed.
- 1539: Francisco de Ulloa explores both coasts, confirms the Baja as a peninsula.
- 1539: Domingo del Castillo, a cartographer in the Francisco de Ulloa expedition, draws his map with an accurate rendering of the peninsula.
- 1578 or 1579: The San Juanillo was the Manila galleon which wrecked on a beach at Baja California in late 1578 or early 1579 became the first shipwreck on the coast of the Californias.
- 1622: A map by Michiel Colijn of Amsterdam showed California as a peninsula rather than an island. Previous maps show the Gulf terminating in its correct location.
- 1690s–1800s: Spanish settlement and colonization in lower Las Californias (Baja California peninsula), the first Spanish missions in Baja California are established by Jesuit missionaries.
- 1701: Explorations by Eusebio Kino expanded knowledge of the Gulf of California coast.
- 1767: Jesuits expelled; Franciscans take over the Baja missions.
- 1769: Franciscans go with the Portola expedition to establish new missions in Alta California. Control of the existing Baja missions passes to the Dominican Order.
- 1773: Francisco Palóu's line demarcates Franciscan and Dominican areas of mission control.
- 1804: Las Californias divided into Alta ("Upper") and Baja ("Lower") California, using Palóu's line.
- 1810–1821: Mexican War of Independence
- 1821: First Mexican Empire, Baja California Territory established, covering Baja California peninsula.
- 1847: The Battle of La Paz and the Siege of La Paz occurs, as well as several other engagements.
- 1848: Treaty of Guadalupe Hidalgo cedes Alta California to the United States. As a U.S. territory it receives the California Gold Rush, causing increased maritime traffic along the peninsula.
- 1850: California admitted to U.S. statehood.
- 1853: William Walker, with 45 men, captures the capital city of La Paz and declares himself President of the Republic of Lower California. Mexico forces him to retreat a few months later.
- 1931: The Territory of Baja California is further divided into Northern and Southern territories (Territory of Baja California Norte and Territory of Baja California Sur).
- 1952: The North territory becomes the 29th State of Mexico, Baja California. The southern portion, below 28°N, remains a federally administered territory.
- 1973: The 1,700 km (1,056 mi) long Trans-Peninsular Highway (Mexican Federal Highway 1), is finished. It is the first paved road that spans the entire peninsula. The highway was built by the Mexican government to improve Baja California's economy and increase tourism.
- 1974: The South territory becomes the 31st State of Mexico, Baja California Sur.
- As of 2000, the five most common indigenous languages in Baja are Mixteco, Zapoteco, Náhuatl, Purépecha, and Triqui.

== Geology ==
The Baja California peninsula was once a part of the North American Plate, the tectonic plate of which mainland Mexico remains a part. About 12 to 15 million years ago the East Pacific Rise began cutting into the margin of the North American Plate, initiating the separation of the peninsula from it. Spreading within the Gulf of California consists of short oblique rifts or ridge segments connected by long northwest trending transform faults, which together comprise the Gulf of California Rift Zone. The north end of the rift zone is located in the Brawley seismic zone in the Salton Sea basin between the Imperial Fault and the San Andreas Fault. The Baja California peninsula is now part of the Pacific Plate and is moving with it away from the East Pacific Rise in a north northwestward direction.

Along the coast north of Santa Rosalia, Baja California Sur is a prominent volcanic activity area.

Volcanoes of the peninsula and adjacent islands include:

- Volcanoes of east-central Baja California
- Cerro Prieto
- The San Quintín Volcanic Field
- Isla San Luis
- Jaraguay volcanic field
- Coronado
- Guadalupe
- San Borja volcanic field
- El Aguajito
- Tres Vírgenes
- Isla Tortuga
- Comondú-La Purísima

Researchers from Scripps Institution of Oceanography have found a 2,000-year-old layer of non-decomposed roots, or peat, up to 4 metres (13 ft) under the desert mangroves. The peat layer acts like a sponge for stored atmospheric carbon, a record of sea-level-rise is also recorded in the peat layer.

The desert mangroves restricted to rocky inlets on the rugged coast of Baja California have been growing over their own root remains over thousands of years to compensate for sea-level rise, accumulating a thick layer of peat below their roots. However, mangroves in flat coastal floodplains have accumulated a thinner peat layer.

== Geography ==
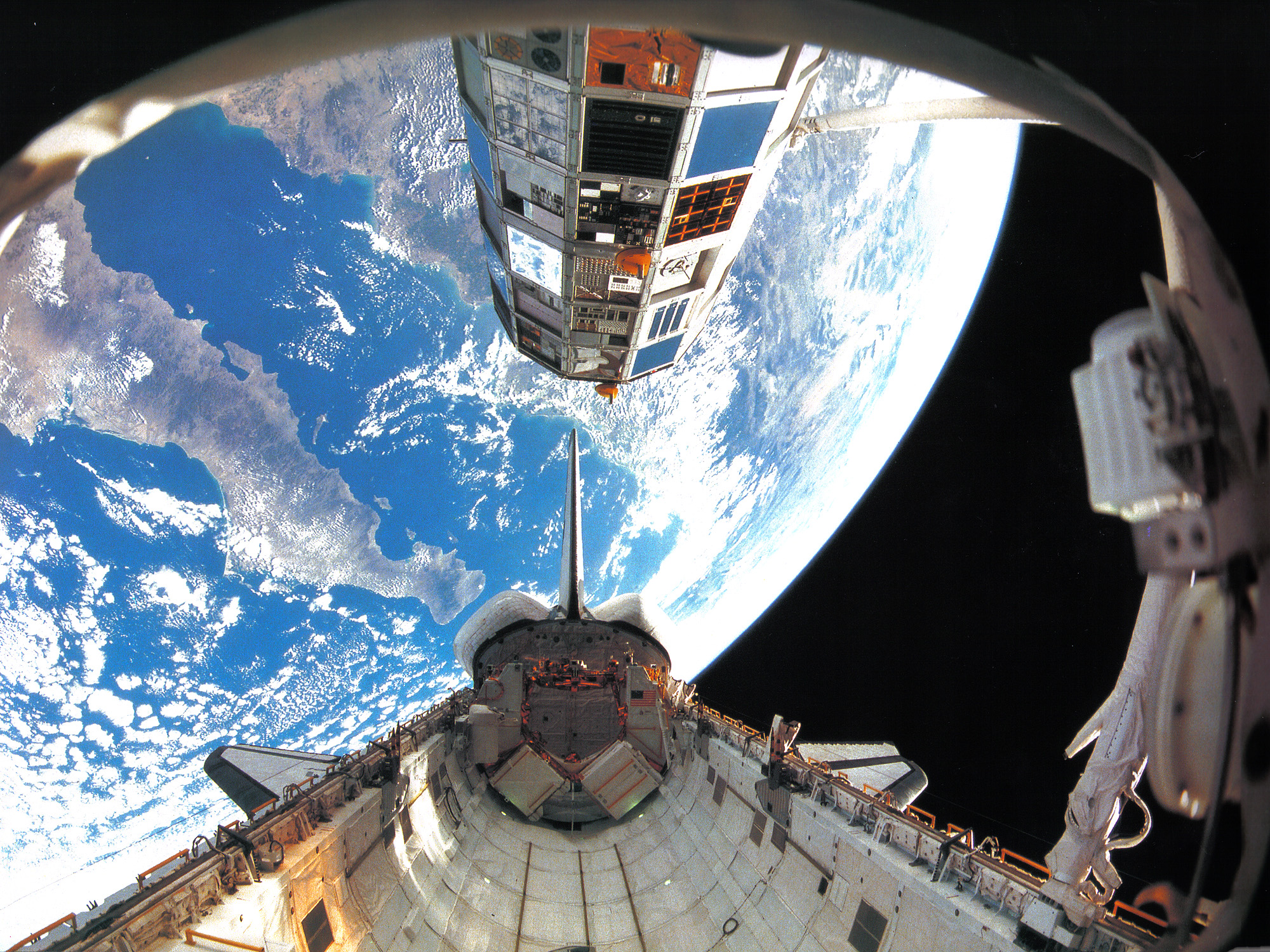
Baja California as seen in April 1984, from the bay of Space Shuttle Challenger during STS-41-C

The Peninsular Ranges form the backbone of the peninsula. They are an uplifted and eroded Jurassic to Cretaceous batholith, part of the same original batholith chain which formed much of the Sierra Nevada mountains in U.S. California. This chain was formed primarily as a result of the subduction of the Farallon Plate millions of years ago all along the margin of North America.

- The Sierra de Juárez is the northernmost range in Mexico.
- The Sierra de San Pedro Mártir runs south of the Sierra de Juárez and includes the peninsula's highest peak, the Picacho del Diablo.
- The Sierra de San Borja runs south of the Sierra de San Pedro Mártir.
- The volcanic complex of Tres Vírgenes lies in Baja California Sur, near the border with the state of Baja California, forming the ranges south of the Sierra de San Borja.
- The Sierra de la Giganta runs along the shore of the Gulf of California south of the Tres Vírgenes complex.
- At the south end of Baja California Sur, the Sierra de la Laguna forms an isolated mountain range rising to 2,090 metres (6,860 ft)
- Another isolated range, the Sierra Vizcaino, juts out into the Pacific between Punta Eugenia and Punta Abreojos.

=== Climate ===
The climate of Baja California peninsula is predominantly a hot desert climate, with the northern parts featuring a Mediterranean climate, and contains some dots of Mediterranean and hot semi arid climate along all of the peninsula.

The two most prominent capes along the Pacific coastline of the peninsula are Punta Eugenia, located about halfway up the coast, and Cabo San Lázaro, located about a quarter of the way north from Cabo San Lucas.

The Sebastián Vizcaíno Bay, the largest bay in Baja California, lies along the Pacific coast halfway up the peninsula. The large Cedros Island is situated between the bay and the Pacific, just north of Punta Eugenia. Onshore southeast of the bay is the Desierto de Vizcaino, an extensive desert lying between the Sierra Vizcaino to the west, and the Tres Virgenes range which runs along the Gulf of California to the east.

The largest bays along the coastline of the Gulf are Bahia de La Paz where the city of La Paz is located, and Bahia Concepcion. The Bahía de los Ángeles is a small bay located west of the Canal de las Ballenas which separates the Baja California peninsula from the large island of Isla Ángel de la Guarda in the Gulf of California.

== Ecoregions ==
The peninsula is home to several distinct ecoregions. Most of the peninsula is deserts and xeric shrublands, although pine-oak forests are found in the mountains at the northern and southern ends of the peninsula. The southern tip of the peninsula, which was formerly an island, has many species with affinities to tropical Mexico.

- California chaparral and woodlands, which covers the Mediterranean climate northwestern corner of the peninsula, as well as Cedros and Guadalupe islands.
- Sierra Juárez and San Pedro Mártir pine–oak forests in the upper reaches of the Sierra Juárez and Sierra San Pedro Mártir ranges in the northern peninsula.
- The Sonoran Desert extends into the northeastern portion of the state, east of the Sierra Juárez and Sierra San Pedro Mártir ranges.
- The Baja California desert extends west of the Peninsular Ranges along the Pacific side of the peninsula for most of its length, and includes the El Vizcaíno Desert and El Vizcaíno Biosphere Reserve.
- The Gulf of California xeric scrub extends along the Gulf of California side of the peninsula for most of its length.
- San Lucan xeric scrub lies in the lowlands of the peninsula's southern tip.
- Sierra de la Laguna dry forests are found on the lower slopes of the Sierra de la Laguna.
- Sierra de la Laguna pine–oak forests are found at higher elevations in the Sierra de la Laguna.
- The Bahía de los Ángeles Biosphere Reserve

== Political divisions ==
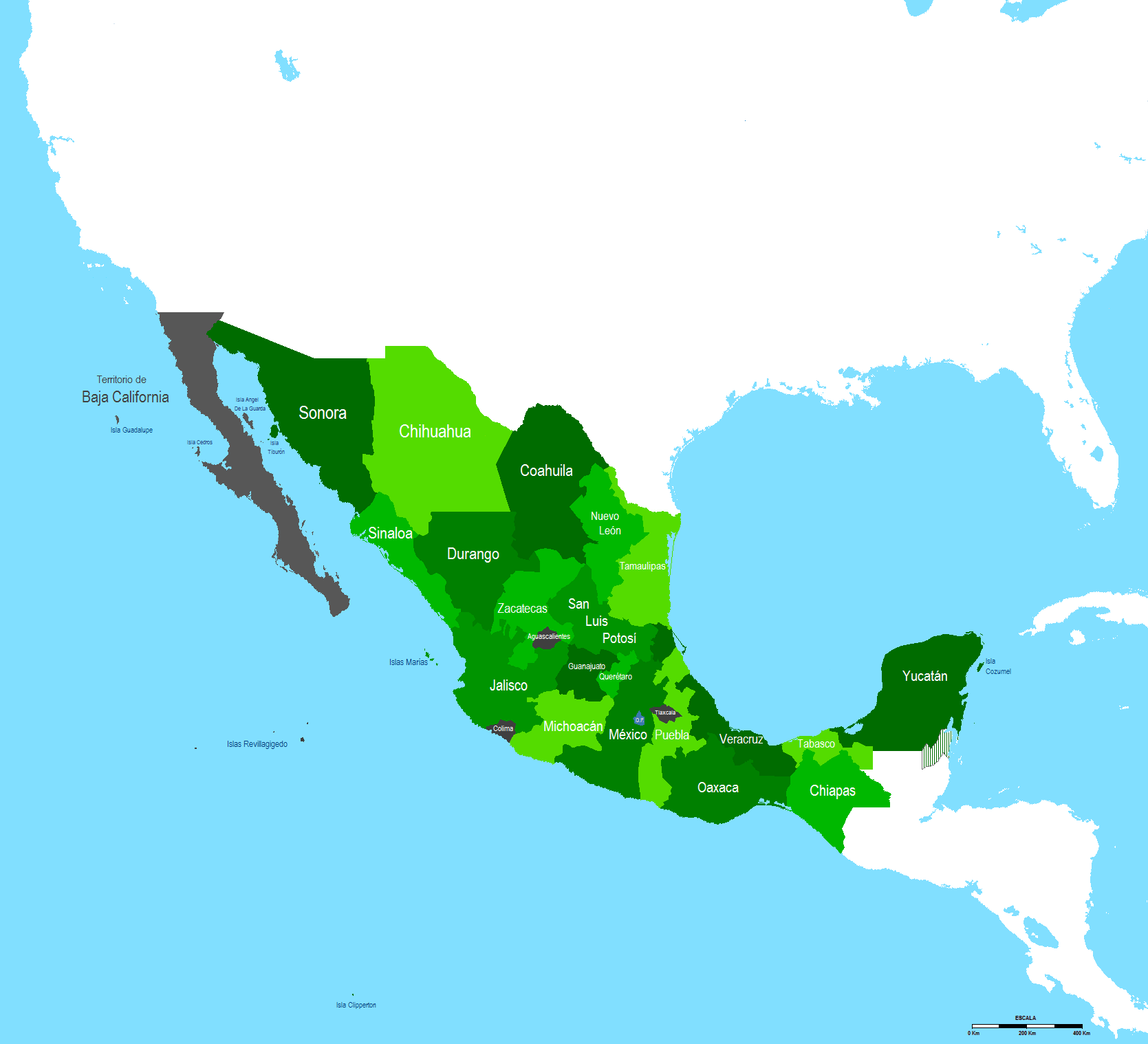
Mexico in 1854, with Baja California Territory in gray (left)

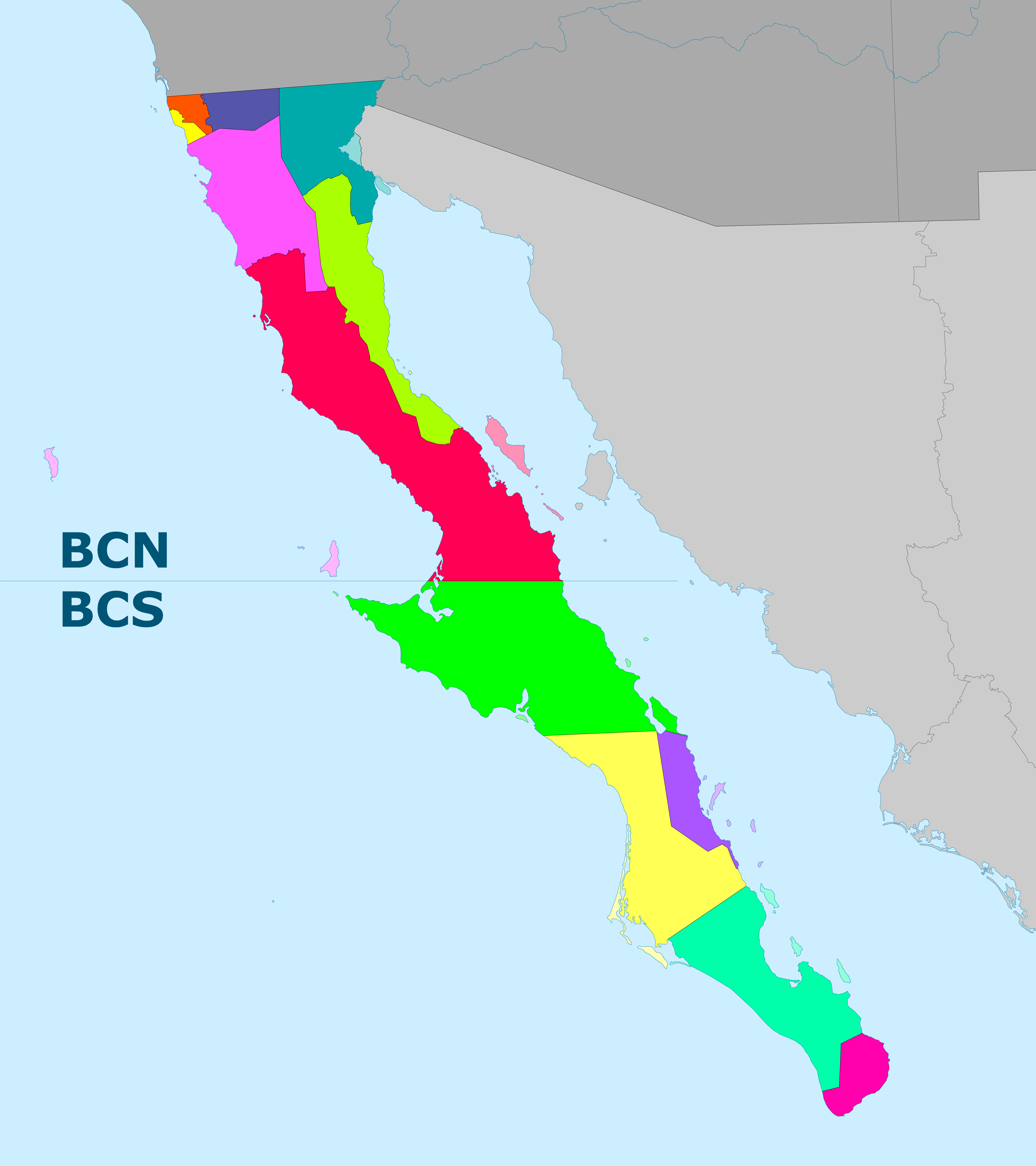
Municipalities in Baja California Peninsula since 2022; includes both Baja California and Baja California Sur Municipalities.

The province of the Californias was united until 1804, in the Spanish colonial Viceroyalty of New Spain, when it was divided into Alta (upper) and Baja (lower) California.

The two Californias division was kept after Mexican independence in 1821. The Spanish Baja California Province became Mexican Baja California Territory, and remained a separate territory until 1836. In 1836, the Siete Leyes constitutional reforms reunited both Californias in the Departamento de las Californias. After 1848, the Baja California peninsula again became a Mexican territory when Alta California was ceded to the United States (see 1854 map).

In 1931, Baja California Territory was divided into northern and southern territories. In 1952, the "Territory of Baja California Norte" became the 29th State of Mexico as Baja California. In 1974, the "Territory of Baja California Sur" became the 31st state as Baja California Sur.

=== Baja California ===
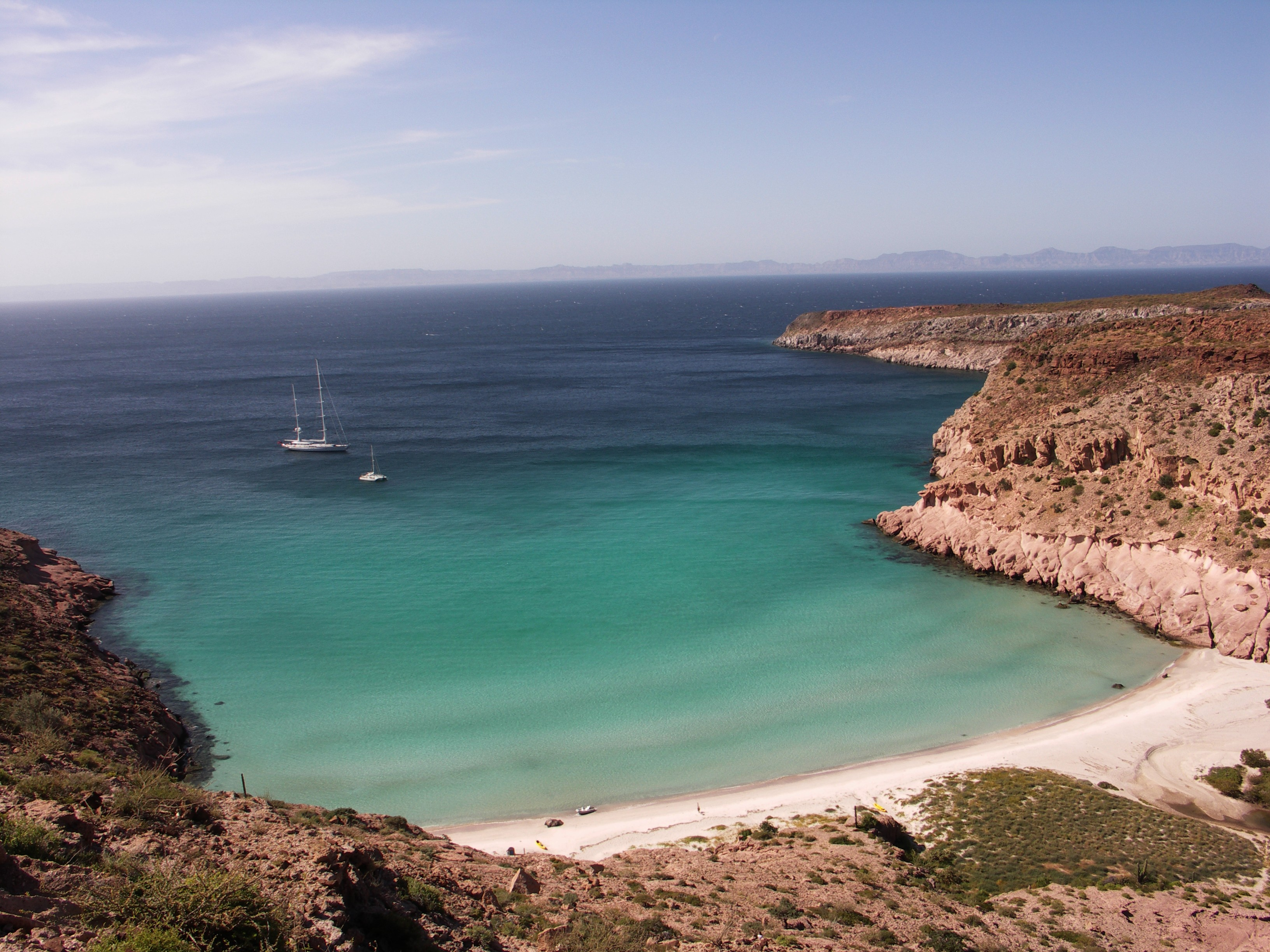
Isla Partida, which is part of the San Lorenzo Marine Archipelago National Park

The northern part is the state of Baja California. It is sometimes informally referred to as Baja California Norte, to distinguish it from both the Baja California peninsula and the adjacent state Baja California Sur. The citizens of Baja California are named bajacalifornianos ("Lower Californians" in English). Mexicali is the capital.

=== Baja California Sur ===
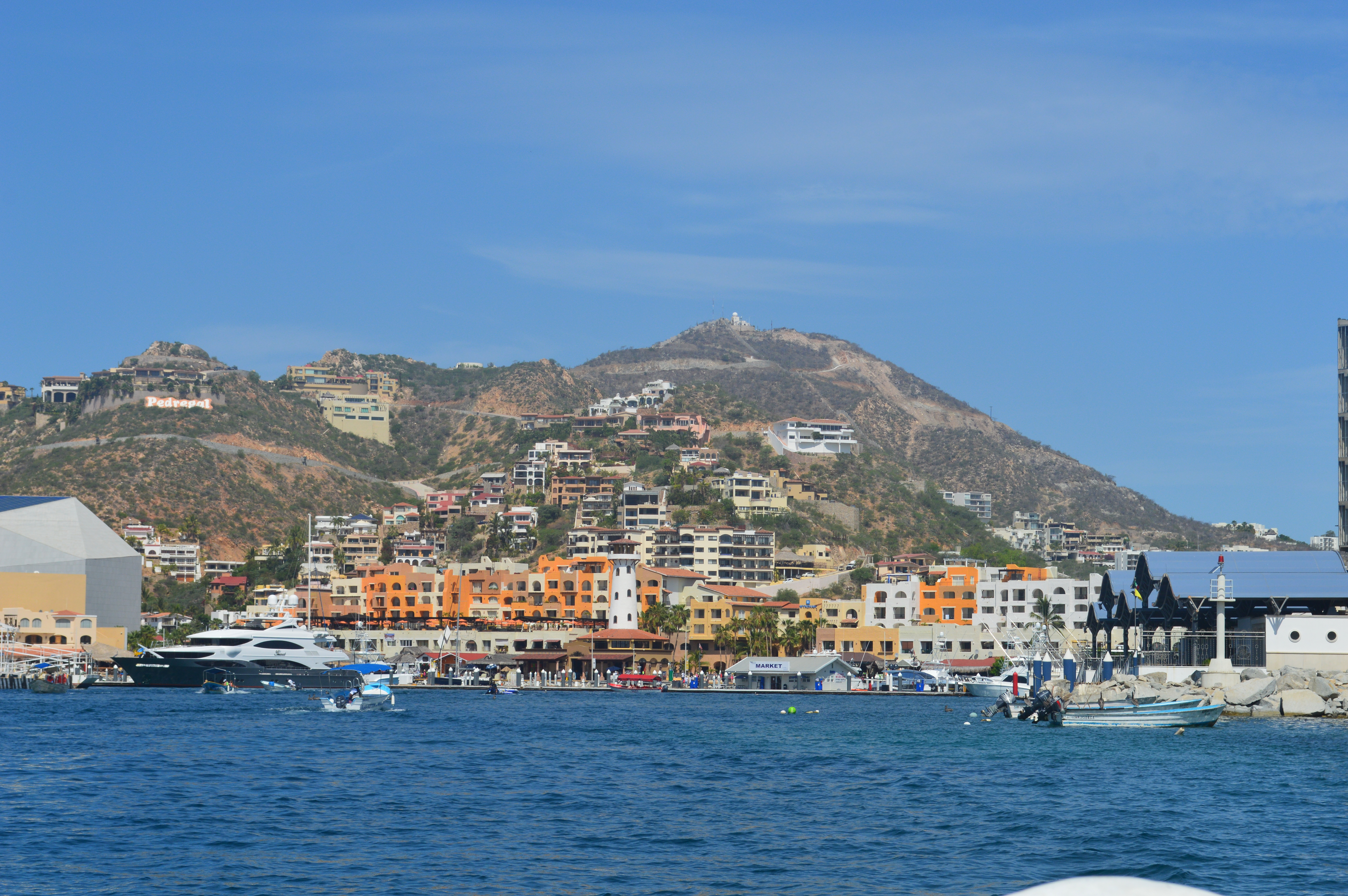
Port of Cabo San Lucas

The southern part, below 28° north, is the state of Baja California Sur. The citizens of Baja California Sur are named sudcalifornianos ("South Californians" in English). La Paz is its capital.

== Tourism ==
The peninsula is known colloquially as Baja by American and Canadian tourists, and is known for its natural environment. It draws ecotourists who go whale watching for migrating California gray whales as well as tourists that arrive to the resorts on the southern tip of the peninsula. Its location between the North Pacific and Gulf of California give it a reputation for sports fishing. Since 1967, the peninsula has hosted the Baja 1000, an off-road race that begins in Ensenada and ends in La Paz.

== Indigenous clothing ==
The traditional/indigenous clothing of Baja California is a pivotal part of the vibrant culture of the peninsula. The area is home to five Yuman groups: the Cucapá, Kiliwa, Pai Pai, Cochimí, and Kumiai. Each group exhibits distinct clothing traditions deeply connected to their cosmovision.

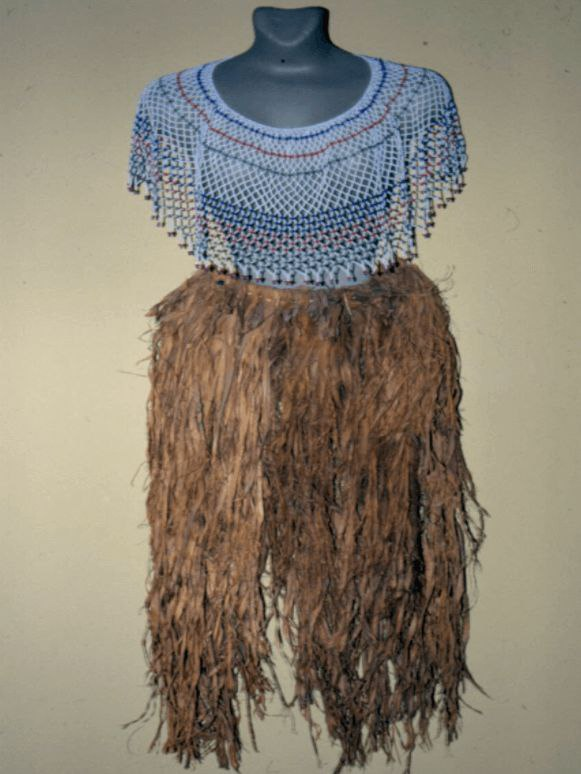
Cucapá willow bark skirt and knit top

Cucapá (Water people): The Cucapá use natural pigments derived from minerals for body paint, employing colors such as yellow, red, white, and black. Married women traditionally painted a red circle with two sidebars on their foreheads, while single women marked their foreheads with a cross. Men adorned themselves with piercings in their ears and noses and wore accessories such as bracelets, belts, and necklaces made from bones or feathers. Women traditionally wore skirts made from willow bark.

Kiliwas (Those who snuggle): Historically, the Kiliwa crafted clothing from the leather of animals they hunted. However, contact with other cultures has led to significant changes. While some continue to use traditional materials like manta fabric, contemporary Kiliwa clothing has incorporated more modern influences. Long hair, often braided, remains a common feature among some Kiliwa men and women.

Pai pai (Unbaptized people): The ancestors of the Pai Pai initially wore no clothing. Over time, women began wearing skirts and blouses made from willow husks, while men donned leather loincloths and went barefoot. Traditional adornments included leather ribbons and feathers. Today, Pai Pai women often wear ankle-length blouses and skirts or dresses, frequently accompanied by headbands. Men commonly wear long pants and shirts.

Cochimí (Foreigners/North people): Cochimí men traditionally wore little clothing, using ornaments made from reeds, shells, and snails. Women wore petticoats crafted from thin reeds woven with vegetable fibers and draped animal skins over their backs. They accessorized with belts at the waist and head coverings fashioned from netting. Footwear included sandals made from leather or ixtle fibers. Following the missionary period, Cochimí descendants adopted elements of cowboy culture, influenced by sustained contact with cattle and sheep ranchers of European and North American descent. This cultural shift significantly altered their clothing, architecture, and social practices.

Kumiai (Those of high places): In earlier times, both Kumiai men and women covered their bodies with the hides of animals they hunted. Deer hides were preferred for their size, while rabbit skins were valued for their warmth and were often used to make blankets for protection against the cold. Over time, the influences of modern civilization have significantly impacted Kumiai traditions, particularly among younger members of the community, who have gradually shown less interest in preserving their ancestral clothing practices. Today, Kumiai men typically wear long pants and shirts, while only older women continue to wear ankle-length dresses made from simple, pale-colored fabrics. Their hair is often styled in long braids.

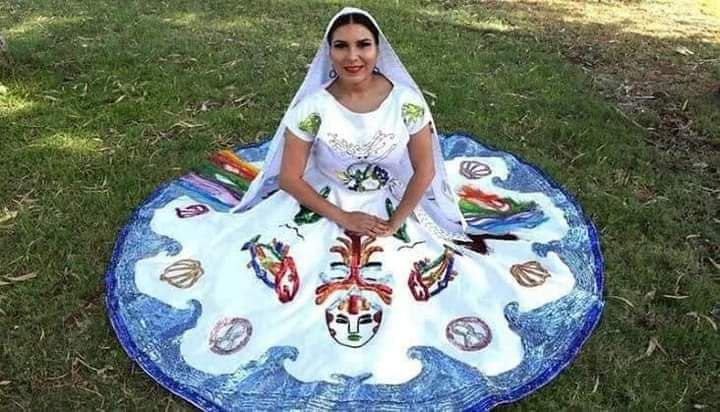
Flor de Cucapá dress

Flor de Cucapá: Flor de Cucapá is the traditional attire of Baja California, created in 1954 as a symbol of cultural and regional identity for one of Mexico's youngest states. This iconic outfit was designed by María de la Cruz Pulido following a state-wide contest organized by the government to represent Baja California's rich natural and cultural heritage. Inspired by the region's diversity, the attire consists of five pieces made of white cotton fabric, each imbued with symbolic meaning. The circular skirt features embroidered details of cacti and marine elements, representing the deserts and the Sea of Cortés. The blouse includes an embroidered depiction of a woman with open arms, symbolizing the warmth and hospitality of the people of Baja California.

== See also ==
- The Californias
- Gulf of California Rift Zone
- Ferdinand Konščak
- Spanish missions in Baja California
