= Kiliwa =

Kiliwa may refer to:

- Kiliwa people, an ethnic group of Mexico
- Kiliwa language, their language
