= Volcanoes of east-central Baja California =

Group of volcanoes in the center-east of the Baja California peninsula

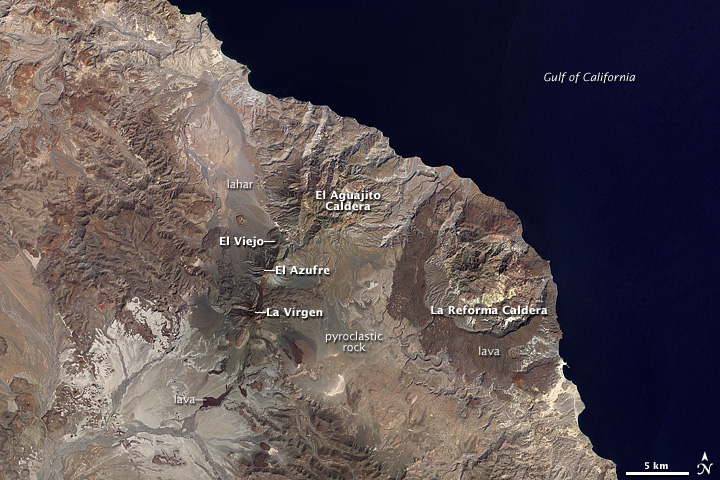
Volcanoes of the east-central Baja California Peninsula. Landsat 7 image, 2000

The volcanoes of east-central Baja California are located on the Baja California Peninsula near the Gulf of California, in the state of Baja California Sur, in Mexico.

== Geography ==
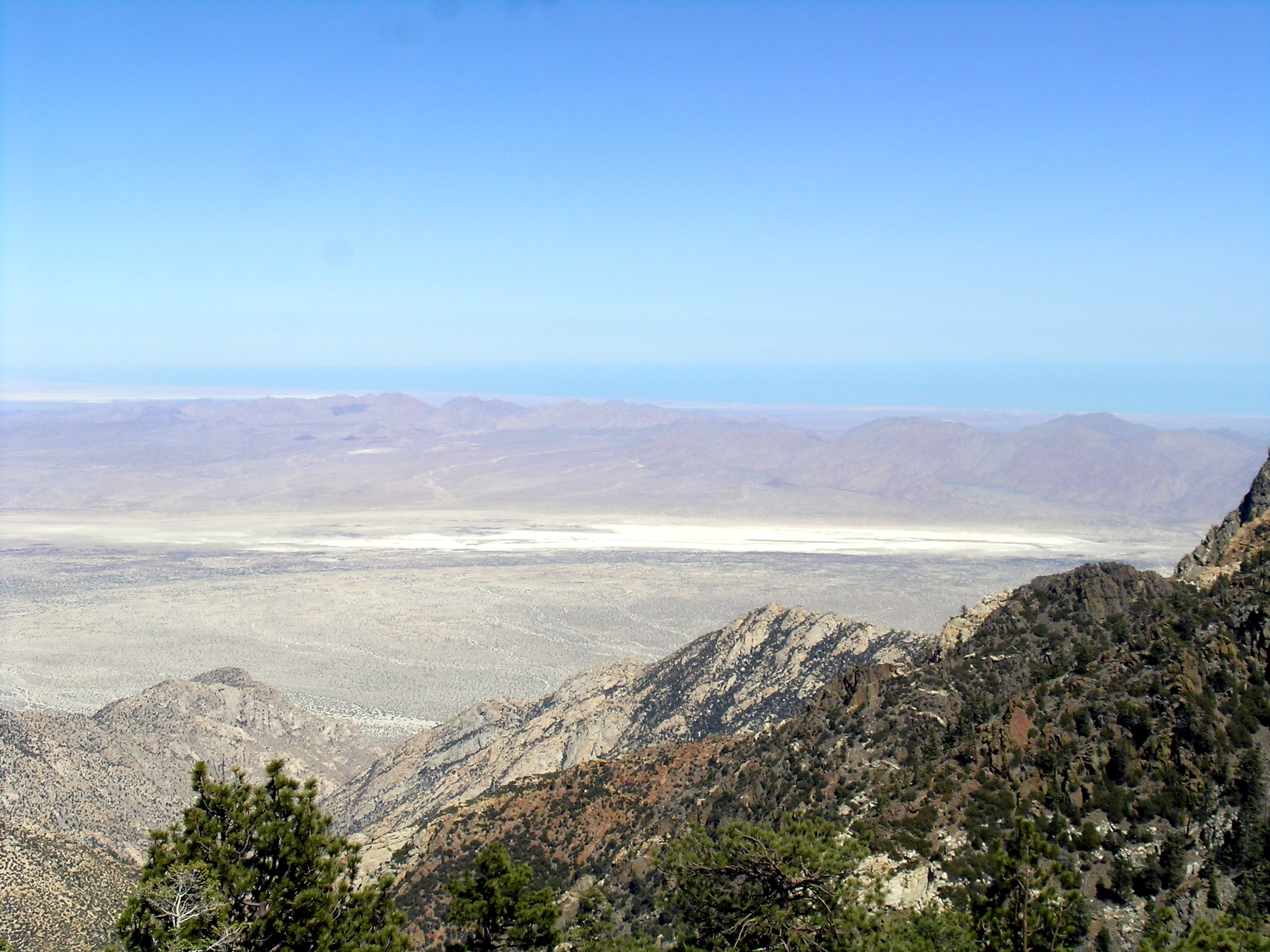
Sierra San Pedro Mártir

Baja California is a peninsula in Mexico, bordering the Pacific Ocean and the Gulf of California. It is made up primarily of mountains, and some coastal plains. The mountain ranges in Baja California, connected to the Pacific Coast Ranges, extend from the north-eastern to the south-western part of the peninsula. Out of the 24 named ranges, the Sierra de Juárez and the Sierra San Pedro Mártir, the highest range in Baja California, are the two most significant. The slopes of the ranges vary depending on location; the slopes on the western side are gentler than those on the east. Coastal plains are mostly found in the south-west regions on the peninsula. In the center of Baja California, volcanic activity is found mostly near the San Ignacio area. The landscape is a patchwork of lava flows and the hardened remains of pyroclastic flows – hot clouds of volcanic ash, dust, and rock fragments that race down the slopes of a volcano like an avalanche.

== La Reforma Caldera ==
La Reforma Caldera is a volcano on the east-central Baja California. It is about 10 km (6.2 mi) in diameter and 1,300 m (4,300 ft) tall. In the east-central Baja California there are several volcanoes and this one lies east of the Tres Vírgenes volcano and southeast of El Aguajito.

La Reforma is a caldera volcano, formed when a large eruption left an empty magma chamber, which the upper volcano collapsed into. La Reforma's last major eruption occurred about 10,000 years ago. Its eruptions have consisted of ash and pumice falls, pumice flows, and pantellerite tuffs. The dark-colored rocks that make up the outer rim of La Reforma formed from very fluid lava.

== Tres Vírgenes ==
The Tres Vírgenes, a line of three connected volcanoes, are west of La Reforma Caldera. They lie NE-SW along the western Gulf of California. The three are La Vírgen (The Virgin) in the southwest, El Azufre (Sulfur) in the center, and El Viejo (The Old One) in the northeast. El Viejo is the oldest and lowest peak, and La Vírgen is the youngest and tallest of the three. It has a history of pumice eruptions and explosive eruptions consisting of pyroclastic flows, dacitic and andesitic lava flows.

The volcanoes get larger and younger from northeast to southwest. They consist of stratovolcanoes, lava domes, and pyroclastic cones. Dacitic lava domes and flows have occurred at El Viejo and El Azufre.

Unlike other volcanoes in Baja California, the Tres Vírgenes are stratovolcanoes, consisting of alternate layers of ash and lava. The last time one of the volcanoes was active was in 1746, with a possible eruption in 1857. The evidence for the 1746 eruption came from a Spanish priest, who at the time was on a navigation in the Gulf of California. In his report, it was said that there was an ash plume from the effusive eruption, and while no tephra deposits have been discovered, there is evidence of andesitic lava flows that could have came from the 1746 eruption.

As recently as 6,500 years ago, La Vírgen experienced a Plinian eruption – a large and explosive event that creates a column of volcanic rock fragments and gas that reaches into the stratosphere. The eruption produced a column that reached at least 18 kilometers into the air and deposited ash and rock fragments over 500 square kilometers. In later stages of the eruption, pyroclastic flows (pinkish rocks) and lahars (mudflows, grayish rocks) from El Azufre Volcano paved the plain to the north all the way to the Gulf of California.

== El Aguajito Caldera ==
El Aguajito Caldera, also known as Santa Ana Caldera, is located northeast of the Tres Vírgenes. The caldera's formation "is associated with the eruption of ignimbrites, K–Ar dated at 0.76±0.06 Ma". The rim of the caldera is approximately 10 km (6.2 mi) wide and is not exposed to the surface. There is an active geothermal system with hot springs on the southern side of the caldera.

== See also ==
- Trans-Mexican Volcanic Belt
- List of volcanoes in Mexico

== References and further reading ==
- Volcanoes on Baja California Peninsula at NASA's Earth Observatory. This article incorporates text from this public domain NASA website. The NASA article includes a link to a high-definition version of the image presented here.
- Capra, L.; Macias, J.L.; Espindola, J.M.; Sieb, C. (1998). "Holocene plinian eruption of La Virgen volcano, Baja California, Mexico". Journal of Volcanology and Geothermal Research. 80 (3–4): 239–266. doi:10.1016/s0377-0273(97)00049-8.
- Hausback, B.P., Stock, J.M., Dmochowski, J.E., Farrar, C.D., Fowler, S.J., Sutter, K., Verke, P., and Winant, C.D. (2000). To be or not to be a caldera—La Reforma caldera, Baja California Sur, Mexico.Geological Society of America, Abstracts with Programs 32(7), A502.
- Garduño-Monroy, V.H.; Vargas-Ledezma, H.; Campos-Enriquez, J.O. (1993). "Preliminary geologic studies of Sierra El Aguajito, Baja California, Mexico: a resurgent-type caldera". Journal of Volcanology and Geothermal Research. 59 (1–2): 47–58. doi:10.1016/0377-0273(93)90077-5.
- Global Volcanism Program | El Aguajito. N.p., n.d. Web. 10 May 2017.
- "El Aguajito." VolcanoDiscovery: volcanoes worldwide - news, info, photos, and tours to volcanoes and volcanic areas, earthquake information. N.p., n.d. Web. 10 May 2017.
- Miller, Cheryl. "TRES VIRGENES." Baja Realty and Investments. N.p., June 2012. Web. 23 Apr. 2017.
- Minch, John, Edwin Minch, and Jason Minch. Geology of Baja California. N.p., n.d. Web. 10 May 2017.
- Tres Virgenes." Global Volcanism Program. Global Volcanism Program, n.d. Web. 23 Apr. 2017.
- Tres Virgenes Volcano." Volcano Discovery. N.p., n.d. Web. 23 Apr. 2017.
- Vacations, C. S. (n.d.). Baja California Sur Geographical Summary. Retrieved April 17, 2017, from http://www.cabosanlucas.net/fast_facts/geographical_summary.php
- Minch, J., Minch, E., & Minch, J. (2011). Brief Summary of the Geology of Baja California. Retrieved May 8, 2017, from http://math.ucr.edu/ftm/bajapages/Geology.html
- Native Trails GmbH & Co. KG. (n.d.). Geography and Climate. Retrieved May 8, 2017, from http://www.nativetrails.de/index.php?id=119&L=1
- The Editors of Encyclopædia Britannica. (n.d.). Baja California. Retrieved May 8, 2017, from https://www.britannica.com/place/Baja-California-peninsula-Mexico
