= La Misión, Baja California =

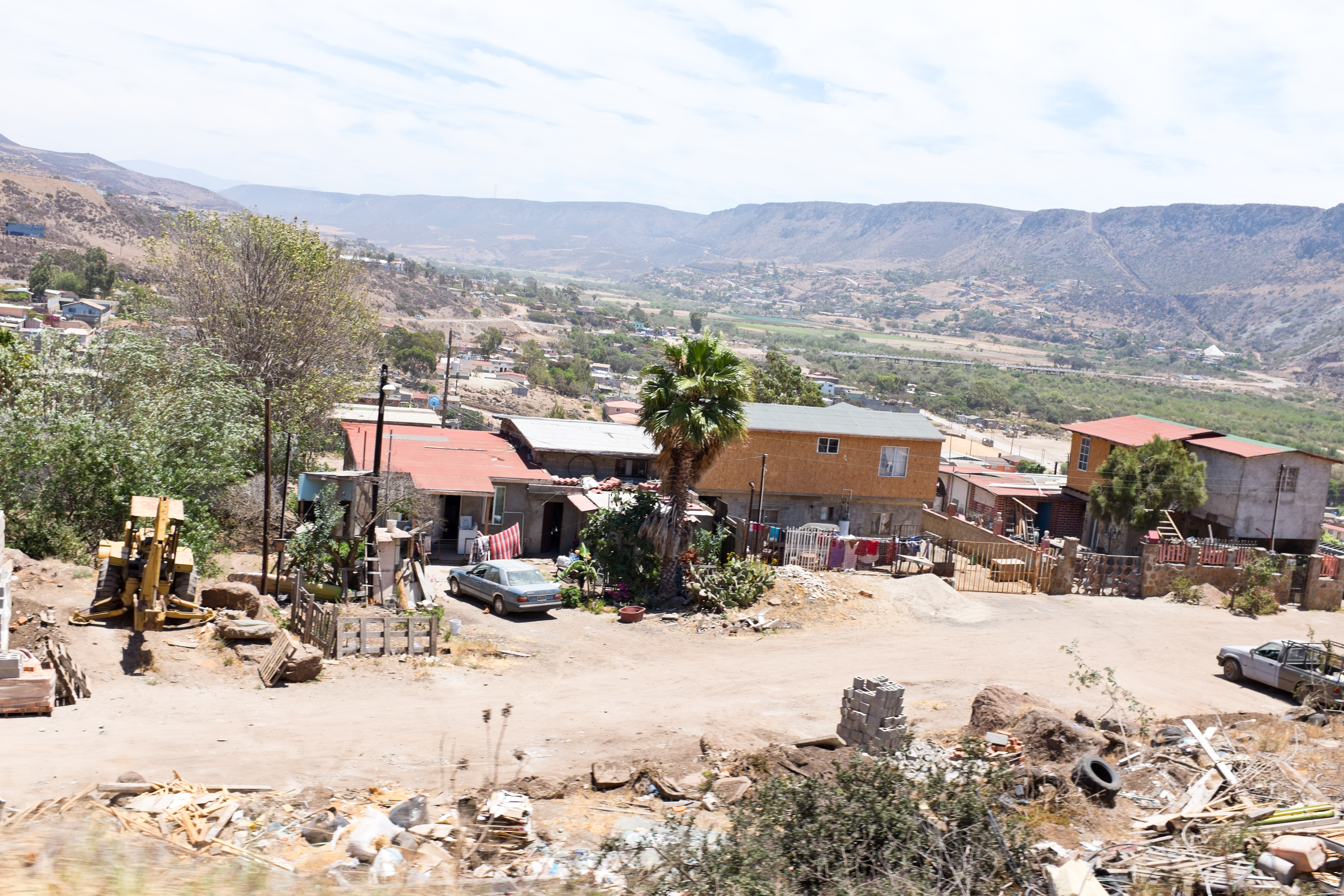

- Location in Mexico
- Coordinates: 32°05′34″N 116°51′08″W
- Country: Mexico
- State: Baja California
- Municipality: Ensenada
- Elevation: 43 ft (13 m)

Population (2010)
  - City: 920
  - Urban: 0
- Time zone: UTC-8 (Northwest US Pacific)
  - Summer (DST): UTC-7 (Northwest)

La Misión or Misión de San Miguel is a village in Baja California located on Mexican Federal Highway 1 approximately 41 miles (66 km) south of the San Ysidro border crossing on the Gold Coast of the Baja California peninsula. The census of 2010 reported a population of 920 inhabitants. The small town of Primo Tapia, located 15 kilometres (9.3 mi) north, is the closest town to La Misión. Puerto Nuevo, known for their lobster restaurants, is 20 kilometres (12 mi) north of the village. La Mision is so small, it is often simply referred to as "K-44" or "kilometro 44", which is its nearest highway marker. The port city of Ensenada is 50 kilometres (31 mi) south of La Misión while the town of Rosarito is 40 kilometres (25 mi) north.

The ruins of Misión San Miguel Arcángel de la Frontera can be found near the center of the village.

== Climate ==
Climate data for La Misión
| Month | Jan | Feb | Mar | Apr | May | Jun | Jul | Aug | Sep | Oct | Nov | Dec | Year |
|---|---|---|---|---|---|---|---|---|---|---|---|---|---|
| Record high °C (°F) | 35.0 (95.0) | 32.0 (89.6) | 35.0 (95.0) | 39.0 (102.2) | 39.0 (102.2) | 39.0 (102.2) | 35.0 (95.0) | 40.0 (104.0) | 41.0 (105.8) | 38.0 (100.4) | 39.0 (102.2) | 34.0 (93.2) | 41.0 (105.8) |
| Mean daily maximum °C (°F) | 21.2 (70.2) | 20.5 (68.9) | 20.8 (69.4) | 21.7 (71.1) | 22.9 (73.2) | 24.0 (75.2) | 26.1 (79.0) | 26.9 (80.4) | 26.6 (79.9) | 25.0 (77.0) | 23.2 (73.8) | 20.4 (68.7) | 23.3 (73.9) |
| Daily mean °C (°F) | 13.6 (56.5) | 13.6 (56.5) | 14.4 (57.9) | 15.5 (59.9) | 17.7 (63.9) | 19.3 (66.7) | 21.5 (70.7) | 21.8 (71.2) | 20.8 (69.4) | 18.5 (65.3) | 15.5 (59.9) | 12.9 (55.2) | 17.1 (62.8) |
| Mean daily minimum °C (°F) | 6.1 (43.0) | 6.7 (44.1) | 7.9 (46.2) | 9.4 (48.9) | 12.5 (54.5) | 14.5 (58.1) | 16.9 (62.4) | 16.6 (61.9) | 15.0 (59.0) | 12.0 (53.6) | 7.9 (46.2) | 5.3 (41.5) | 10.9 (51.6) |
| Record low °C (°F) | −1.0 (30.2) | 0.0 (32.0) | 2.0 (35.6) | 4.0 (39.2) | 4.0 (39.2) | 6.0 (42.8) | 9.0 (48.2) | 9.0 (48.2) | 8.0 (46.4) | 5.0 (41.0) | 0.0 (32.0) | −2.0 (28.4) | −2.0 (28.4) |
| Average precipitation mm (inches) | 45.5 (1.79) | 82.5 (3.25) | 29.7 (1.17) | 18.6 (0.73) | 4.7 (0.19) | 0.7 (0.03) | 0.5 (0.02) | 0.0 (0.0) | 2.0 (0.08) | 24.9 (0.98) | 16.6 (0.65) | 58.9 (2.32) | 284.6 (11.20) |
Source: Servicio Meteorologico Nacional
