= Luis Sales =

Spanish missionary (1745–1807)

Luis Sales (1745–1807) served as a Dominican missionary in Baja California, Mexico, between 1773 and 1790. He is most notable for three long letters in which he described the history of the peninsula and the lifeways of the native peoples in its northwestern region.

== Life ==
Sales was born in Valencia, Spain in 1745. He was with the initial group of Dominican missionaries who took over responsibility for the Baja California missions in 1773 from the Franciscans, who in turn had replaced the expelled Jesuits in 1768. Sales apparently served at the missions of El Rosario, San Vicente, and San Miguel. In 1790 he received permission to return to Valencia where he died in 1807.

Sales wrote three letters to an anonymous friend in Valencia while he was serving at San Miguel and during his voyage home. The first provided a brief geographical description of the peninsula and then discussed in detail the customs and character of the Indians on its northwestern frontier, particularly regarding the Kiliwa and Paipai. The second letter continued the discussion of ethnography and related the history of Spanish involvement, including a lengthy digression on the Nootka Crisis. The third letter discussed the Dominican role in Baja California.

Sales' view of the native peoples was often strongly negative, recalling the acerbity of the Jesuit Johann Jakob Baegert. However, Sales provided indispensable information about traditional subsistence activities, religion, and many other matters.
