= Kiliwa language =

Yuman language of Baja California, Mexico

Kiliwa
- Koleeu ñaja'
- Native to: Mexico
- Region: Baja California
- Ethnicity: Kiliwa
- Native speakers: 4 (2018); 76 (2020)
- Language family: Yuman–Cochimí: Kiliwa
- Writing system: Latin

Official status
- Official language in: Mexico
- Regulated by: Instituto Nacional de Lenguas Indígenas

Language codes
- ISO 639-3: klb
- Glottolog: kili1268
- ELP: Kiliwa
- Kiliwa is classified as Critically Endangered by the UNESCO Atlas of the World's Languages in Danger.

Kiliwa (also Kiliwi, Ko’lew or Quiligua) (in Kiliwa: Koleeu ñaja) is a Yuman language spoken in Baja California, in the far northwest of Mexico, by the Kiliwa people.

Seventy-six people reported their language as Kiliwa in a 2020 census. However, a count in 2018 found only four speakers remaining.

== History ==
The Kiliwa language was extensively studied by Mauricio J. Mixco, who published Kiliwa texts as well as a dictionary and studies of syntax.

As recently as the mid-1900s, Mixco reported that members of the native community universally spoke Kiliwa as their first language, with many Kiliwas also bilingual in Paipai. At the start of the twenty-first century, Kiliwa is still spoken; a 2000 census reported 52 speakers. However, the language is considered to be in danger of extinction.

Kiliwa is a language of the Yuman Family Language Summit, held annually since 2001.

== Classification ==
Kiliwa is the southernmost representative of the Yuman family, and the one that is most distinct from the remaining languages, which constitute Core Yuman. The Kiliwa's neighbors to the south, the Cochimí, spoke a language or a family of languages that was probably closely related to but not within the Yuman family. Consequently, the Kiliwa lie at the historic "center of gravity" for the differentiation of Yuman from Cochimí and of the Yuman branches from each other.

Linguistic prehistorians are not in agreement as to whether the Kiliwa's linguistic ancestors are most likely to have migrated into the Baja California peninsula from the north separately from the ancestors of the Cochimí and the Core Yumans, or whether they became differentiated from those groups in place. The controversial technique of glottochronology suggests that the separation of Kiliwa from Core Yuman may have occurred about 2,000–3,000 years ago.

== Phonology ==
=== Consonants ===
	Bilabial	Alveolar	Palatal	Velar		Uvular	Glottal	
	Bilabial	Alveolar	Palatal	plain	lab.	Uvular	plain	lab.
Nasal	m	n	ɲ					
Stop/Affricate	p	t	tʃ	k	kʷ	q	ʔ	
Fricative		s		x	xʷ		h	hʷ
Rhotic		r						
Approximant		l	j		w			

Intervocalic allophones of /p, t, k, kʷ/ can occur as [β, ð, ɣ, ɣʷ]. An approximant sound such as /j/ after a glottal /h/ can become devoiced as [j̊], as with a devoiced [ʍ] sound being an allophone of /hʷ/.

=== Vowels ===
There are three vowel quantities; /i, u, a/, that can also be distinguished with vowel length /iː, uː, aː/. Close vowel sounds /i, u/ can range to mid vowel sounds as [e, o], and with vowel length as [eː, oː]. An epenthetic schwa sound [ə] can occur within root-initial consonant clusters.

=== Pitch accent ===
Kiliwa has three pitch accents, those being high-level, high-falling, and low level.

== Orthography ==
=== Alphabet ===
The Kiliwa language is written using a modified Roman alphabet, as the language's culture has historically been unwritten and entirely oral. It consists of 15 consonants which includes 3 digraphs: ⟨b⟩, ⟨ch⟩, ⟨g⟩, ⟨h⟩, ⟨hh⟩, ⟨k⟩, ⟨l⟩, ⟨m⟩, ⟨n⟩, ⟨nh⟩, ⟨p⟩, ⟨s⟩, ⟨t⟩, ⟨w⟩, and ⟨y⟩.

Alphabet
Letter	Phoneme	Kiliwa examples	English translation
b	/b/	A'bobuin Ábel	Which? Where?
ch	/t͡ʃ/	Chiin Jcheet	Laugh Steal
g	/g/	Mugaw Msig	Flour One
h	/h/	Ha' Haa	Mouth Yes
k	/k/	Jaq Kujat	Bone Blood
l	/l/	Lepee Msigl paayp	Liver Six
m	/m/	Meyaal Smak	Tortilla Leaf
n	/n/	Nay Mpaan	Kid Sister
ny	/ɲ/	Nhieeg Jnhieel	Black Lariat
p	/p/	Pa Gap	Stomach Pain
s	/s/	Smaa Kiis	Sleep Large
t	/t/	Tmaa Mat	Eat No
w	/w/	Kuwaa	Sit
y	/j/	Yiit Tay	Seed Big
'	/ʔ/	Jo’on Msi'	Very Star

There are also 5 short and 5 long vowels: /a/, /aː/, /e/, /eː/, /i/, /iː/, /o/, /oː/ , /u/, and /uː/. These are represented in the chart below.

Vowels
Vowels	IPA	Kiliwa Examples	English Translation
a	/a/	Ábel Tay	Where Big
aa	/aː/	Jaa Maaw Yaaywaa	To go Grandma scorpion
e	/e/	Enhoop Pel wat Miy pi jse	Fight To return Quill
ee	/eː/	Eel Teey; Juwee	Sore Night; To give
i	/i/	Ipaa Kaichmaa Kemelootí	People Money/metal/iron
ii	/iː/	Yiit Chiin; Tiingkiil	Seed Laughter mockingbird
o	/o/	Kotip Jsilo	Heart Hole
oo	/oː/	Enhoop Kekoo	Fight/ To struggle Woman
u	/u/	Ujaa Ku'nip	Look after/look out for Poor
uu	/uː/	Uusmaat Piyauup; Kuu	Sleep To carry/load Grandpa (maternal)

Other digraphs used in the Kiliwa language include: gu, hu, and ku. They are shown in the chart below.

Digraphs	Phoneme	Kiliwa Examples	English Translation
gu	/ɡʷ/	Pagu Hkuigu	Rabbit Hunt
hu	/hʷ/	Phuhk’ ii Mphuh-mi	Thud This box/bag
hu	/hʷ/	Huwaa u Ju sawi	Seat Clean
ku	/kʷ/	Hkuigu Tukuipaai	To hunt Animal

The inclusion of / , / is used as a brief pause, such as that in Spanish.

=== Numbers ===
Numbers in Kiliwa can be expressed up to several thousands without the use of Spanish loanwords. Counting is done using both fingers and toes. There is a resemblance of the Kiliwa word ‘sal’ which is the root for ‘finger/hand’.

Number	Kiliwa	English translation
1	Msig	One
2	Juwak	Two
3	Jmi'k	Three
4	Mnak	Four
5	Salchipam	Five
6	Msigl paayp	Six
7	Juwakl paayp	Seven
8	Jmi'kl paayp	Eight
9	Msig tkmat	Nine
10	Chipam msig	Ten

The following numbers are formed by using the form for the ten's place 'chipam' followed by its multiplier digit (the digits of those listed above from 1-9).

Number	Kiliwa	English translation
10	Chipam msig	Ten
20	Chipam juwak	Twenty
30	Chipam jmi'k	Thirty
40	Chipam mnak	Forty
50	Chipam salchipam	Fifty
60	Chipam msigl paayp	Sixty
70	Chipam juwakl paayp	Seventy
80	Chipam jmi'kl paayp	Eighty
90	Chipam msig tkmat	Ninety

The hundreds are formed by using the expression ‘chipam msig u’ kun yuu chipam’ followed by the multiplier digits found in that of numbers 1-9.

Number	Kiliwa	English translation
100	Chipam msig u’ kun yuu chipam msig	One hundred
200	Chipam msig u’ kun yuu chipam juwak	Two hundred
300	Chipam msig u’ kun yuu chipam jmi'k	Three hundred
400	Chipam msig u’ kun yuu chipam mnak	Four hundred
500	Chipam msig u’ kun yuu chipam salchipam	Five hundred
600	Chipam msig u’ kun yuu chipam msigl paayp	Six hundred
700	Chipam msig u’ kun yuu chipam juwakl paayp	Seven hundred
800	Chipam msig u’ kun yuu chipam jmi'kl paayp	Eight hundred
900	Chipam msig u’ kun yuu chipam msig tkmat	Nine hundred

Lastly, the thousands are formed by using the expression ‘chipam msig u’ kuetet’ before using the multiplier digits once again.

Number	Kiliwa	English Translation
1,000	Chipam msig u’ kuetet msig	One thousand
2,000	Chipam msig u’ kuetet juwak	Two thousand
3,000	Chipam msig u’ kuetet hmi'k	Three thousand
4,000	Chipam msig u’ kuetet mnak	Four thousand
5,000	Chipam msig u’ kuetet salchipam	Five thousand
6,000	Chipam msig u’ kuetet msigl paayp	Six thousand
7,000	Chipam msig u’ kuetet juwakl paayp	Seven thousand
8,000	Chipam msig u’ kuetet jmi'kl paayp	Eight thousand
9,000	Chipam msig u’ kuetet msig tkmat	Nine thousand
10,000	Chipam msig u’ kuetet cipam msig	Ten thousand

== Morphology ==
The morphology in the Kiliwa language consists of many affixes and clitics. More of these are available on the verb rather than the noun. These affixes are usually untouched and added on to a modified root.

=== Singular and plurals ===
In Kiliwa there are multiple ways of pluralizing words. There are several to differentiate it from the singular form. The most common affixes are t, chau, m, u and si’waa.

Singular	Plural	Language
This Mi	These Mit	1.English 2.Kiliwa
Sit Kuwaa	All of you sit Kuwaat	1.English 2.Kiliwa
Come! Kiyee	All of you come Kitiyee	1.English 2.Kiliwa
Want Unyieey	We want Unyieey chau	1.English 2.Kiliwa
Owl Ojoo	Owls Ojoo chau	1.English 2.Kiliwa
Hill Weey	Hills Uweey	1.English 2.Kiliwa
Coyote Mlti’	Coyotes Mlti’ si’waa	1.English 2.Kiliwa
Eye Yuu	Eyes Yuum	1.English 2.Kiliwa

There are also some instances in which the plural form changes the vowels, for example: Kill! (Kinyii); Kill them! (Kenyoot); Grab! (Kiyuu); Grab them! (Kiyeewi); Stand! (Ku'um); All of you stand! (Ke'ewi).

=== Adverbs ===
Used in adjectives or nouns to denote a superlative degree of meaning.

Examples:

Good/better	Mgaai maai
Dwarf	Nmoohh maai
Heavy	Mechaa maai
Injured	Tgap maai
Horrible	Hhchool maai

Other adverbs include: Mgaai (better), Mak (here), Paak (there), Psap mi (today), Hhchoom (yesterday), Kiis i'bm (later), Mat pi’im kun (never)

Examples:

Is better	Mgaai gap
She is the best	Paa mgaai gap eto
He is better than me	Paa mgaai gap nhal im mat

There is no one here	Mak ma'ali uma
Get out of here	Mak kpaam
Come here	Mak kiyee

There it is	Paak kuwaa
The car passed by there	Owa' kose'hhin e' mil pahhkaai tomat
Stand right there	Paa ku'u' kiyuu

I can't today	Psap mi ahhaa mat semioo
My mom will come today	Psap mi nhab nh'oo puhhaa
The party is today	Enhiaai yiima’ u’ enhiaai mim

It rained a lot yesterday	Hhchoom hhu'hhak maai
My dad left yesterday	Nhab s’oot hhchoom kupaa tomat
I went to the beach yesterday	Hhchoom hha' tayel ahhaa

I’ll see you later	Kiis i’bm maat psaawi

I’ll never visit you	Mat pi’im kun mil waal ahhaa mat
Why don’t you ever come?	Piyim mat pi’im miyee mat mi o'
Why don’t you ever visit me?	Mat pi’im kun pinhee mi mat i'

=== Adjectives ===
-Tay: something of a big/great size for animals and objects or someone obtains a higher power/status due to profession.

Examples:

Big head	'Ii tay
Big nose	Pi' tay
Big dog	Tat tay

Attorney	Ha' kumaag tay
Architect	Uwa' kosay tay
Painter	Tukujaay tay

Suffix P is used to signify something of a smaller degree for several adjectives.

Examples:

Wet	Ja'al
Somewhat wet	Ja'alp

Dark	Teey
Somewhat dark	Teeyp

Black	Nyieeg
Somewhat black	Nyieegp

Skinny	Jo'on
Somewhat skinny	Jo'onp

Dry	S'aay
Somewhat dry	S’aayp

=== Conjunctions ===
Conjunctions are connect two or more ideas into a single sentence.There are also disjunctive conjunctions to separate two or more mutually exclusive options presented in a sentence.

Examples: /and/ translates in Kiliwa to e.

Juan and Pedro	Juan e Pedro e
Water and salt	Ja' e kuii e
Dog and cat	Tat e nmi’ e
You and I	Ma’p e nyaap
Chair and table	Juwaa u’ e tmaa tay u’

=== Verbs ===
- Verbs are more complicated than nouns in Kiliwa language
- There are more verb prefixes present, and fewer suffixes and infixes
- The prefixes demonstrate more structure within the grammar

==== Conjugation ====
The conjugation allows us to tell what the action is doing and taking place in the verb

- Example in Kiliwa: Conjugation of Verb Tmaa (eat)

==== Past and present ====
===== Present =====
I eat	Nhaap tmaa
You eat	Ma'p tma-maa
He/She eats	Nhipaa tmaa
We eat	Panhaap tmaa
They eat	Nhipaat tmaa-t

===== Past =====
I ate	Nhaap kuiil tmaa
You ate	Ma'p kuiil tmamaa
He/She ate	Nhipaa kuiil tmaa
We ate	Panhaap kuiil tmaat chau
They ate	Nhipaat kuiil tmaat chau

===== Future =====
I will eat	Nhaap tmaa seti' uma'
You will eat	Ma'p tmamaa seti' uma'
He/She will eat	Nhipaa tmaa seti' uma'
We will eat	Panhaap tmaat chaut seti' uma'
They will eat	Nhipaat tmaat chaut seti' uma'

=== Nouns ===
In the Kiliwa language they are marked by the definite and indefinite

Definite	Indefinite
-hi (singular)	-si(singular)

==== Determiner NP ====
Kiliwa has 3 degrees of distance that appear in the third person pronoun

Examples:

-mi	“This” (near speaker)
-paa	“That” (near hearer)
-nyaa	“That” (far from both)

==== Demonstrative NP ====
Kiliwa language is also measured in the independent third-person pronoun in the demonstrative Np

Examples:

Mi-chau → ‘these;they’ → (near speaker)

paa-chau → ‘those;they → (near hearer)

nyaa-chau → “those;they → (far from both)

mi-t cham ‘This/(s)he leaves (it)’

mi-chau-t caam-u → ‘These/they leave (it)’

m '-saau ‘I see this one/him/her’

mi-chau=m=juak-m ʔ-cam → ‘I leave with these/them’

mi-chau-l '-saau ‘I looked into these one/them’

=== Gender markers ===
When referring to a male human or animal one adds kumeei

When referring to a female human or animal one adds kökoo

==== Axis ====
Example: kumeei is male and kökoo is female

Dog	Tat
(Female) dog	Tat kökoo
(Male) dog	Tat kumeei
Cow / Bull	Hhak
Cow	Hhak kökoo
Bull	Hhak kumeei

== Syntax ==
Kiliwa is a verb-final language that usually follows the order subject-object-verb. Dependent object clause should be found before the verb, whereas relative or adjectival clauses appear following the noun they modify. While behavioral context, negations, auxiliaries, etc. can alter the placement of certain aspects, the Object-Verb form remains true in most sentences.

Example of transitive sentence in which the structure is simply object-verb:

This one/he/she eats/ate coyotes.
Kiliwa	Subject	Object	Verb
mit melti’caum pahmaa	this one - mit	coyotes - melti’caum	eats/ate - pahmaa

Sentences with a negation typically contain the object-verb format, however, basic structure would be subject - pre-verb negative - object - verb - final negative. Example:

This man did not shoot that dog
Kiliwa	Subject	Pre-verb Neg.	Object-Verb	Final Neg.
kuumiimit kuat tatpaam hkkaa mat	This man - kuumiimit	did not - kuat	shoot (that) dog - tatpaam (that dog) hkkaa (shoot)	mat

== Toponyms ==
The following Kiliwa toponyms are from the map given in Mixco (2000:70).

Settlements

- Ja' Kupan /xaʔ kupan/ – Agua Caliente
- Jpi' Kunaan /xpiʔ kuna:n/ – San Isidro
- Mjuaa /mxʷa:/ – Los Coches
- Pnyil /pɲil/ – Santo Domingo
- Ku'ii Yuwu /kuʔi: yuwuʔ/ – San Quintin
- Juiim Ja' /xʷi:m haʔ/ – San Felipe
- Ipaa Cha'amui /ipa: t͡ʃaʔamʷi/ – Tijuana
- Jua Nyimaat /xʷa: ɲima:t/ – Mexicali
- Ja'Tay Juatu' /xaʔtaj xʷatuʔ/ – Ensenada
- Yuul Mat /ju:l mat/ – Santa Catarina

Natural features

- Ku'ii Yaku' /kuʔiː yakuʔ/ – Salinas
- Hiil /hi:l/ – Cañón de la Esperanza
- Hyaau /hʲa:w/ – San Matías Pass
- Kumsalp /kumsalp/ – Colnett Point

Mountains

- Mou Weey /mow we:j/ – Cerro Borrego
- Nyaay Weey /ɲa:j we:j/ – peak just to the south of Cerro Borrego
- Mou Wa' Weey /mow waʔ we:j/ – Cerro Salvatierra
- Kaay Spkuin /ka:j spkʷin/ – peak just to the south of Cerro Salvatierra
- Mt Waay Walu Weey /mt wa:j walu we:j/ – Picacho de Diablo
- Jaal Jak /xa:l xak/ – Sierra de San Pedro Martir
- Kunyil Weey /kuɲil we:j/ – Cerro Colorado

Bodies of water

- Ja'tay /xaʔtaj/ – Pacific Ocean
- Chuwílo Tay /t͡ʃuwilo taj/ – Arroyo Grande
- Mat Pchuj /mat pt͡ʃux/ – San José Creek
- Msuan /msʷan/ – San Telmo Creek
- Jmil /xmil/ – San Rafael River
- Ja' Hiil /xaʔ hi:l/ – Colorado River
