= Misión San Miguel Arcángel de la Frontera =

18th-century Spanish mission in Baja California, Mexico

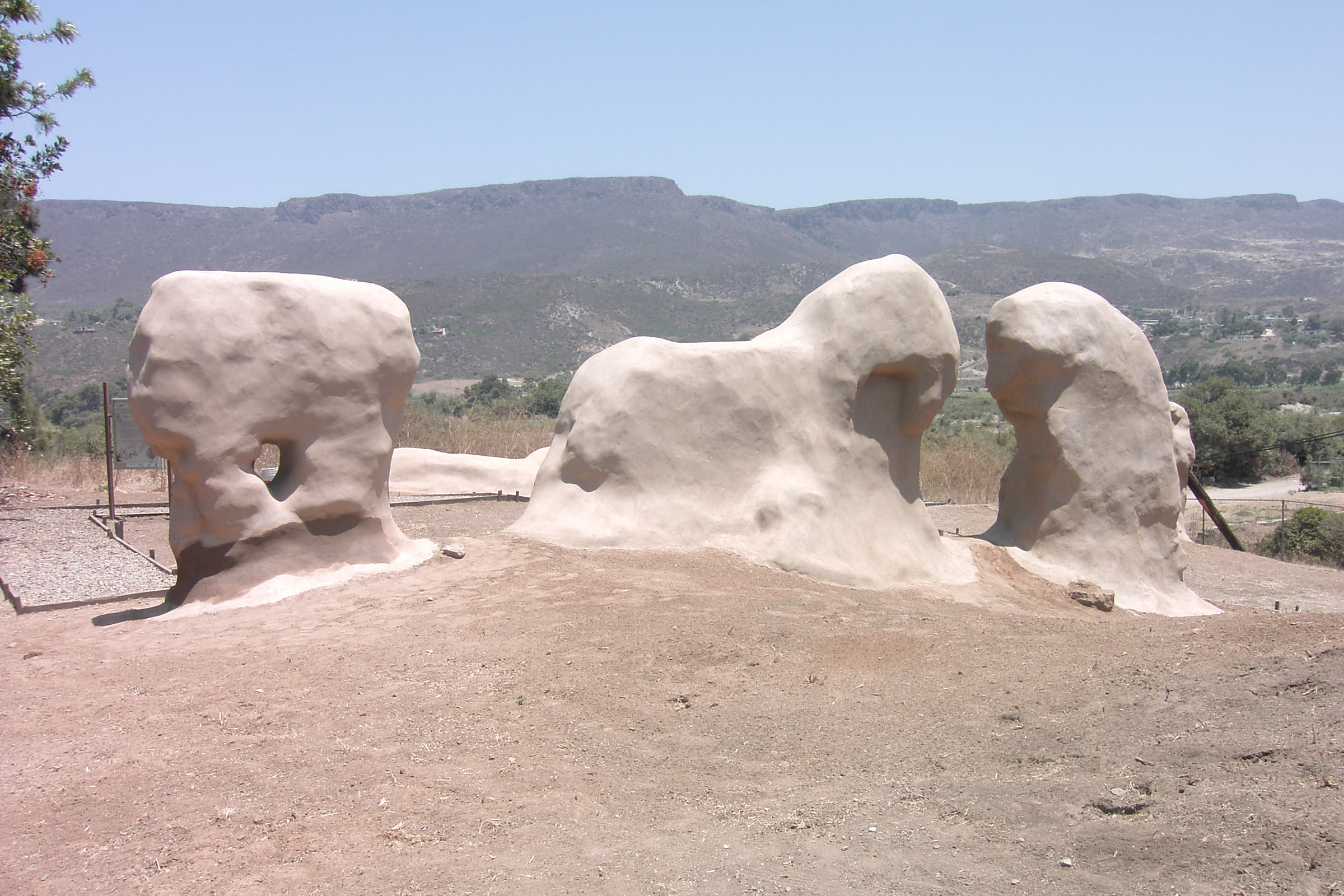
- Ruins of the mission

- Location in Baja California Location in Mexico
- Location: La Misión, Baja California, Mexico
- Coordinates: 32°05′39″N 116°51′16″W
- Patron: Archangel Michael
- Founded: 28 March 1787
- Founded by: Luis Sales
- Native tribe(s) Spanish name(s): Kumeyaay

Another mission bearing the name San Miguel Arcángel is the Mission San Miguel Arcángel in San Miguel, California.

Mission San Miguel (Spanish: Misión San Miguel Arcángel de la Frontera) was a Spanish mission established on 28 March 1787 by the Dominican missionary Luis Sales among the Kumeyaay people of northwestern Baja California, Mexico. The ruins of the mission are located in present-day Ejido La Misión, Baja California in the municipio of Ensenada. The mission ruins are behind the local school, on the north side of Highway 1.

== History ==
It was near this place that, in 1773, a large cross was erected to indicate the boundary of missionary responsibilities in Las Californias between Franciscans (north) and Dominicans (south). Franciscan missionary Francisco Palóu, on his way to San Diego, supervised the operation. In 1804, the same line was used to divide Las Californias into separate provinces of Alta California and Baja California. Today's border between the United States and Mexico is about 48 kilometres (30 mi) to the north.

The mission was built with the support of six soldiers from the Presidio of San Diego and five others probably from Mission San Vicente. They had just begun to build the first houses and plant the first crops when the neighboring San Juan Bautista Creek ran dry. This forced them to move the mission to a new site called San Juan Bautista, 10 km upstream, where there was a good supply of water.

== Mission complex ==
The enclosure was rectangular, with the church and the residential quarters facing east and south. It had an open patio, the only entrance to which was a large door located in the southeast corner of the complex, protected by a barrack. The complex also included an irrigation ditch, four granaries, two houses, a corral, and three other rooms.

The buildings of the complex were made of adobe, with round stone foundations, set at a depth of 90 cm, cemented with a mortar of clay, sand, and lime. The adobe bricks resting on the foundation were cemented with the same mortar and placed in an alternating fashion to give the structure more strength and stability, making walls from 0.9 to 1.1 m thick. The adobe was made with local soil, water, clay, sand, and straw to make it more resistant.

The walls probably reached a height of 4.5 m, and the roofs were interlaced with tule branches possibly over beams or with adobe tile. The floors were made of flooring tile.

== Location and natural habitat ==
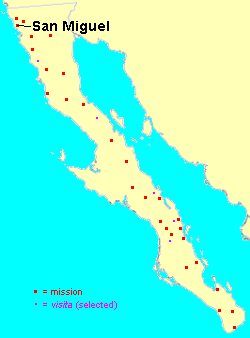
Location of Mission San Miguel among the Spanish missions in Baja California

This Mission is located at the base of a mountain, surrounded by meadows and hills, crossed by the San Juan Bautista stream, also known as the Guadalupe River. Further downhill this stream joins the sea, forming an estuary rich in diverse types of plants and animals, such as white herons and wild ducks.

The missionaries wrote in their diaries about finding plentiful pasture in the area and further inland as well as watercress, chia, mangrove, cattail, brushwood, a few isolated pines, yucca, mesquite, sycamores, chamomile, willows, and evergreen oaks.

The native animals that inhabited the region were coyotes, bobcats, beavers, moles, rabbits, squirrels, rats, and mice, among others. There were also marine species such as sea bass, corbina, tuna, sardine, boga octopus, abalone, clam, and mussel.

The humidity at San Miguel Arcángel de la Frontera favored the development of cattle herds. According to the missionaries' reports, they had more than 3,000 head of cattle, goats, and sheep, as well as 400 horses and mules in the meadows.

Agricultural crops included wheat, maize, cantaloupe, watermelon, beans, lentils, vegetables, grapes, and barley.

== Conservation ==
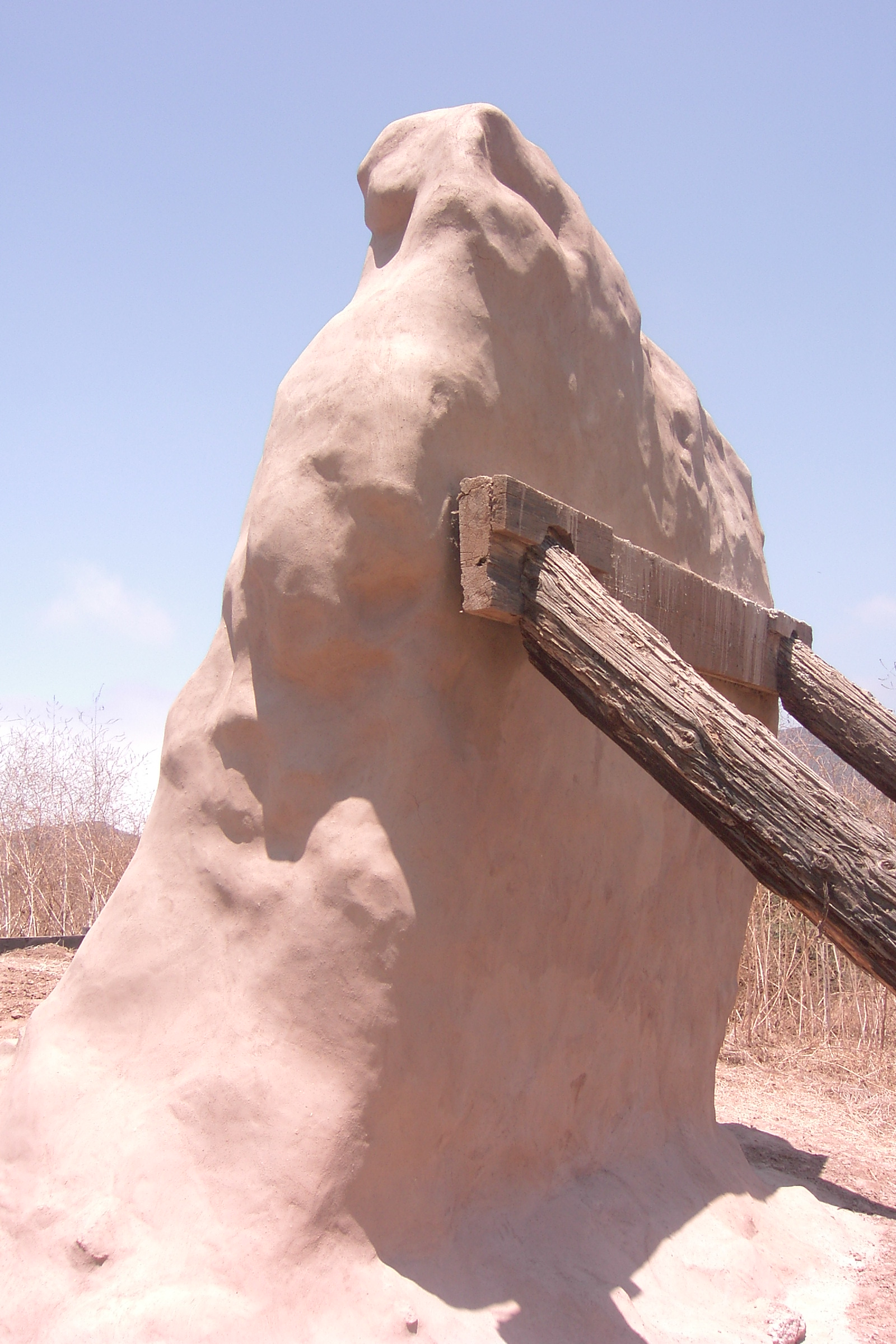
A shored-up Mission wall.

Conservation efforts at San Miguel form part of the "Camino Real Misionero de las Californias" program of Mexico's National Institute of Anthropology and History (INAH). Foundations of the eroded walls have been consolidated. Rain gutters have been built to divert the water and prevent its concentration at the base of the remains. One of the walls has been shored. The remains of the walls are covered by a layer made of clay, sand, water, slices of nopal cactus, and manure to protect them from the wind, sunlight, and rain.

== See also ==
- Spanish missions in Baja California

== See also ==
- Spanish missions in Baja California
- Spanish missions in California
