= Paipai people =

Indigenous people of Mexico living in northern Baja California, Mexico

Paipai Akwa'ala
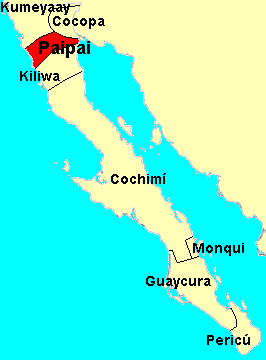
- Map of Paipai territories in northern Baja California

Total population
- Approx. 1800

Regions with significant populations
- Mexico (Baja California)

Languages
- Paipai and Spanish

Religion
- Traditional tribal religion, Christianity

Related ethnic groups
- Kiliwa, Kumeyaay, Yavapai

The Paipai (Pai pai, Pa'ipai, Akwa'ala, Yakakwal) are an Indigenous people of Mexico living in northern Baja California. Their traditional territory lies between the Kiliwa on the south and the Kumeyaay and Cocopa on the north, and extending from San Vicente near the Pacific coast nearly to the Colorado River's delta in the east. Today they are concentrated primarily at the multi-ethnic community of Santa Catarina in Baja California's Sierra de Juárez.

== Population ==
Meigs suggested that the aboriginal populations associated with San Vicente and Santa Catarina missions were respectively 780 and 1,000 individuals. Hicks estimated 1,800 for the aboriginal population of the Paipai, or a density of 0.3 persons per square kilometer. Owen argued that these estimates were substantially too high. However some studies show that there are less than 200 speakers of the Paipai language left, because the new generations do not find it necessary to learn the Paipai language.

== Language ==
A Paipai speaker, recorded in Mexico.

The Paipai language was documented by Judith Joël, who have published texts and studies of phonology, morphology and syntax. Mauricio J. Mixco have published transcription of stories. It is very close to the Upland Yuman language spoken by the Yavapai, Walapai, and Havasupai of western Arizona.

== Subsistence ==
Aboriginal Paipai subsistence was based on hunting and gathering of natural animal and plants rather than on agriculture. Numerous plants were exploited as food resources, notably including agave, yucca, mesquite, prickly pear, acorns, pine nuts, and juniper berries. Many other plants served as medicine or as material for construction or craft products. Animals used for food included deer, pronghorn, bighorn sheep, rabbits, woodrats, various other medium and small mammals, quail, fish, and shellfish. Crop growing and stock raising were introduced during the historic period.

== Culture ==
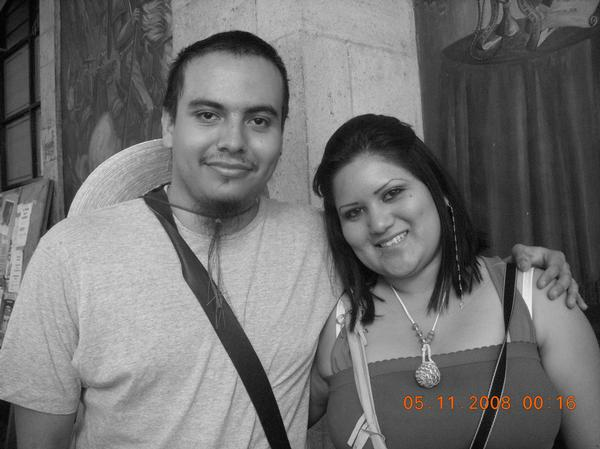
Young Mestizo and Paipai couple in Mexico

Information about the cultural practices of the precontact Paipai comes from a variety of sources. These include the accounts of the maritime expedition led by Sebastián Vizcaíno; reports by late 18th and early 19th century observers, such as Luis Sales and José Longinos Martínez; and the studies of 20th century ethnographers, including Edward W. Gifford, Robert H. Lowie, Peveril Meigs, Philip Drucker, William D. Hohenthal, Roger C. Owen, Thomas B. Hinton, Frederic N. Hicks, Ralph C. Michelsen, Michael Wilken-Robertson, and Julia Bendímez Patterson.

=== Material culture ===
Paipai traditional material culture included structures (rectangular thatched-roof houses, ramadas, and probably sweathouses), equipment for hunting and warfare (bows, cane arrows, war clubs, nets), processing equipment (pottery, basketry, manos and metates, mortars and pestles, cordage, stone knives, awls), clothing (rabbitskin robes, fiber sandals; buckskin aprons and basketry caps for women), and cradles.

=== Social organization ===
Kinship was based on patrilineal, patrilocal šimułs. It is not clear to what extent communities coincided with šimułs prehistorically; in historic times, community membership was quite fluid. The existence of any formal community leaders was denied by some; if they were present, their authority was probably not strong.

Social recreations included a variety of games: shinny, kickball races, the ring-and-pin game, dice, peon, archery, spinning tops, juggling, and cat's cradle. Music was produced by singing and by instruments that included flutes, gourd rattles, and jinglers. Pets were kept.

=== Traditional narratives ===
Traditional narratives are conventionally classed as myths, legends, tales, and oral histories. The oral literature recorded for the Paipai is rather limited but includes narratives that can be assigned to each of these categories. Paipai narratives such as the creation myth show their closest affinities with those of the Kumeyaay to the north.

== History ==
The Paipai first encountered Europeans when Sebastián Vizcaíno's expedition mapped the northwest coast of Baja California in 1602. More intensive and sustained contacts began in 1769 when the expedition to establish Spanish settlements in California, led by Gaspar de Portolà and Junípero Serra, passed through the western portions.

The Dominican mission of San Vicente was founded near the coast in Paipai territory in 1780. It became a key center for the Spanish administration and military control of the region. In 1797 San Vicente was supplemented by an inland mission at Santa Catarina, near the boundary between Paipai and Kumeyaay territories. Mission Santa Catarina was destroyed in 1840 by hostile Indian forces, apparently including Paipai.

The main modern settlement of Paipai is at Santa Catarina, a community they share with Kumeyaay and Kiliwa residents.
