= Paipai language =

Yuman language spoken in Mexico

Paipai
- Akwa'ala
- Region: Mexico
- Ethnicity: Paipai people
- Native speakers: 230 (2020 census)
- Language family: Yuman: Core Yuman; Pai ?; Paipai

Language codes
- ISO 639-3: ppi
- Glottolog: paip1241
- ELP: Paipai
- Paipai is classified as Severely Endangered by the UNESCO Atlas of the World's Languages in Danger.

Paipai is the native language of the Paipai, spoken in the Baja California municipality of Ensenada. It is part of the Yuman language family. The number of speakers has dwindled to around 231 people due to factors like colonization, and most speakers are over the age of 50. The majority of Paipai now live in Kumeyaay villages, where the language continues to be spoken.

The Paipai language was documented by Judith Joël and Mauricio J. Mixco, who have published texts and studies of syntax.

Video of Armandina González speaking Paipai

== Classification ==
Paipai belongs to the Yuman language family. Within the Yuman family, Paipai belongs to the Pai branch, which also includes the Upland Yuman language, dialects of which are spoken by the Yavapai, Walapai, and Havasupai of western Arizona. The relationship between Paipai and Upland Yuman is very close; some observers have suggested that Paipai and Yavapai are mutually intelligible (i.e., that the Paipai and Upland Yumans spoke dialects of a single language), while other observers have claimed that they are not.

The controversial technique of glottochronology suggests that the Pai branch of Yuman may have separated from the other two branches of Core Yuman (River Yuman and Delta–California Yuman) about 1,000-1,700 years ago. Paipai may have separated from Upland Yuman 1,000 years ago or less. In the oral tradition of most Yuman tribes, the people descended from Avikwame (also known as Newberry Mt.) and went where the spirit Kumat directed them. So at one time, the Paipai likely lived farther north among the other Pai people.

== Distribution ==
The language was traditionally spoken between the Pacific coast and to where the Colorado River Delta opens at the Gulf of California. Today, its distribution has been reduced to Ensenada, located along the western half of the language's original boundaries.

It is currently spoken in the following settlements of Ensenada, with specific subdivision or alternate names written in parentheses and with autonyms written in brackets (if known): Arroyo de León (Ejido Kiliwas), Camalu, Cañón de la Parra, Comunidad Indígena de Santa Catarina, Ejido 18 de Marzo (El Álamo), El Aguajito (El Mat Chip), El Alamar, El Pinacate [Chknan], El Ranchito [Wikwalpuk], El Sauzal, Ensenada, Ex Hacienda Sinaloa, Héroes de la Independencia (Llano Colorado), Lázaro Cárdenas (Valle de Trinidad), La Huerta, La Vinata [Wipuk], Leyes de Reforma (El Rodeo), Misión Santo Domingo, Ojo de Agua Colorada, Poblado Héroes de Chapultepec, Poblado Puerta Trampa, Pórticos del Mar, Ranchito Xonuko, Rancho Agua de Vida, Rancho el Sauco, Rancho Escondido, Rancho las Canoas, Rancho Mariscal, Rancho San Belem, Rancho Santa Martha, Real del Castillo Nuevo (Ojos Negros), Rincón de Santa Catarina, San Isidoro, Sauce Largo [Yokakgul], Sauce Solo [Yokazis], Úrsulo Galván, Valle de la Trinidad, and Yokakiul.

== Phonology ==
=== Consonants ===
| | | Bilabial | Alveolar | Retroflex | Palatal | Velar | | | Uvular | | Glottal |
| | | Bilabial | Alveolar | Retroflex | Palatal | nor. | lab. | pal. | nor. | lab. | Glottal |
|---|---|---|---|---|---|---|---|---|---|---|---|
| Plosive | | p | t | ʈ | tʃ | k | kʷ | kʲ | q | qʷ | ʔ |
| Fricative | voiceless | | s | ʂ | ʃ | x | xʷ | | | | h |
| Fricative | voiced | β | | ʐ | | | | | | | |
| Nasal | | m | n | | ɲ | | | | | | |
| Rhotic | | | ɾ | | | | | | | | |
| Lateral | fricative | | ɬ | | | | | | | | |
| Lateral | approx. | | l | | ʎ | | | | | | |
| Semivowel | | w | | | j | | | | | | |

- /x/ can be heard as uvular [χ] when preceding consonants, or in syllable initial position.
- /ʐ/ can be heard as an alveolar trill [r] in free variation among speakers.

=== Vowels ===
| | Front | Central | Back |
|---|---|---|---|
| Close | i iː | | u uː |
| Mid | e eː | | o oː |
| Open | | a aː | |

- /a/ can be heard as [ə] in syllable initial position.
