= Aguajito =

Volcano in Baja California Sur, Mexico

El Aguajito
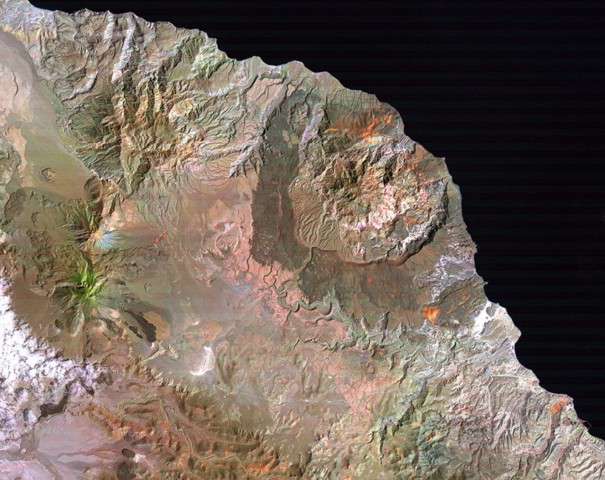

Highest point
- Elevation: 1,300 m (4,300 ft)
- Coordinates: 27°36′N 112°32′W

Geography
- Location within Mexico
- Location: Gulf of California, Mulegé Municipality, Baja California Sur, Mexico

Geology
- Mountain type: Caldera
- Last eruption: Pleistocene

El Aguajito (also called Santa Ana caldera) is a caldera volcano located on the Gulf of California in Mexico.

It is located between the Tres Virgenes volcano and the La Reforma caldera.
