= Isla San Luis =

Island in the Gulf of California

- Location within Mexico

Geography
- Location: Gulf of California
- Coordinates: 29°58′17.41″N 114°24′26.30″W
- Highest elevation: 150 m (490 ft)

Administration
- Mexico
- State: Baja California

Demographics
- Population: uninhabited

Isla San Luis is an island in the Gulf of California east of the Baja California Peninsula. The island is uninhabited and is part of the San Felipe Municipality.

== Biology ==
Isla San Luis has three species of reptiles: Callisaurus draconoides (zebra-tailed lizard), Dipsosaurus dorsalis (desert iguana), and Uta stansburiana (common side-blotched lizard).
