= Tres Vírgenes =

Complex of volcanoes located Mulegé Municipality, Mexico

Volcán Las Tres Vírgenes
- El Virgen
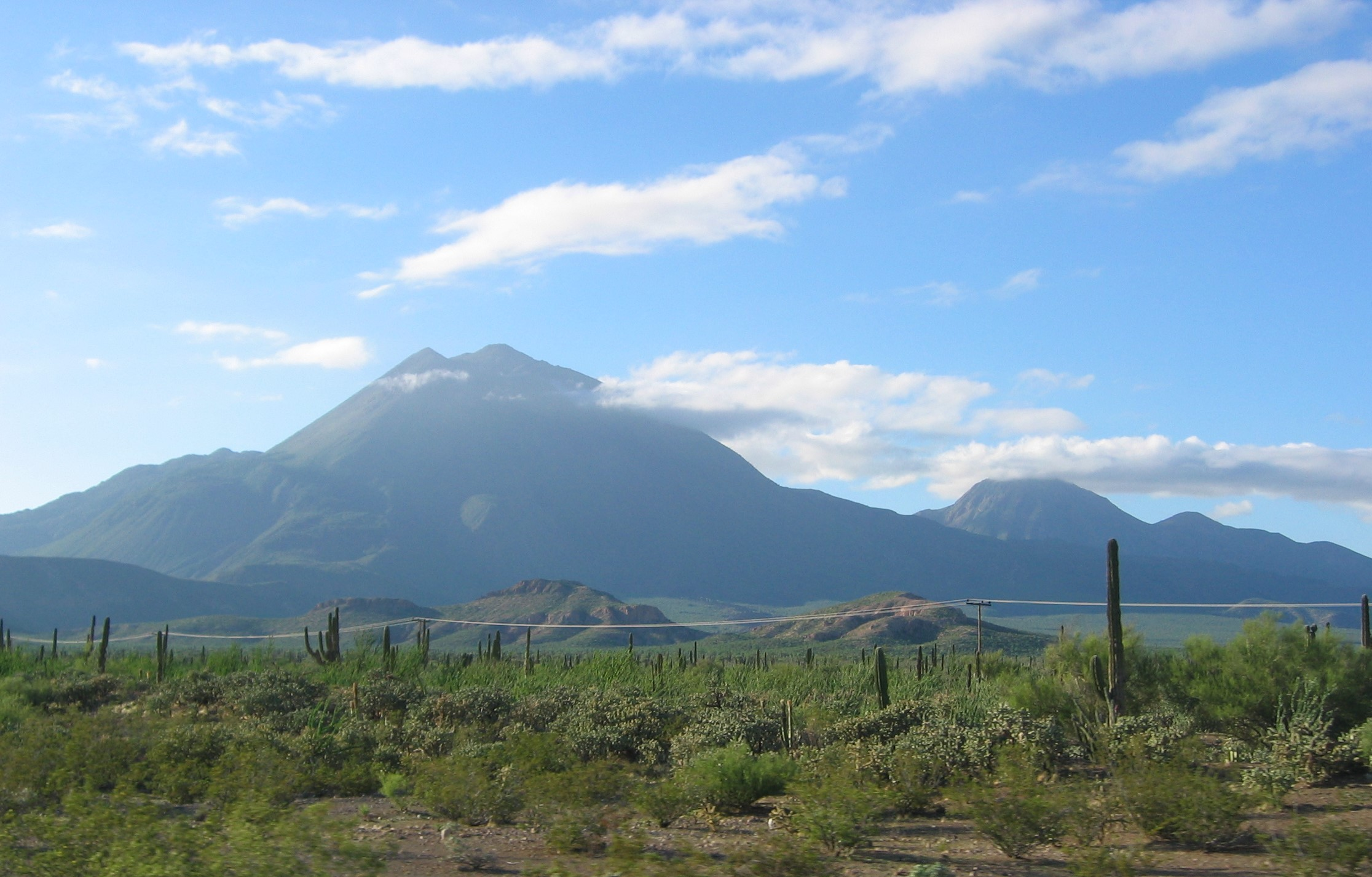
- Volcán Las Tres Vírgenes in 2004.

Highest point
- Elevation: 1,940 m (6,360 ft)
- Prominence: 1,610 m (5,280 ft)
- Listing: North America isolated peaks 59th; Ultra prominent peak
- Coordinates: 27°28′12″N 112°35′30″W

Geography
- Location within Mexico
- Location: Baja California Sur, Mexico

Geology
- Mountain type: Stratovolcano
- Last eruption: Disputed, see Eruption history section

Tres Vírgenes is a complex of volcanoes located in the Mulegé Municipality in the state of Baja California Sur, on the Baja California Peninsula in northwestern Mexico. This Volcano is part of a volcanic ridge that extends from Baja California towards the Guaymas Basin.

It is composed of three volcanoes, aligned northeast–southwest, with El Viejo, the oldest, to the northeast, El Azufre in the middle, and the youngest, El Vírgen, to the southwest.

El Vírgen, being by far the most conspicuous of the three, is commonly known as "Las Tres Vírgenes".

== Geological Background ==
Volcán Las Tres Vírgenes is part of a cluster that includes the central vent structure of El Azufre and El Viejo. The off-shore volcanic ridges extend from Tres Vírgenes–Aguajito–La Reforma towards sea-floor spreading centers in the Guayamas basin. It is located within the Gulf of California rift zone. It is a part of a volcanic ridge that extends from the eastern coast of Baja California towards active sea floor spreading in the Guaymas basin.

== Geologic Structure ==
The ground floor of Las Tres Vírgenes volcano holds the oldest rock in the region which is a granitic rock of the Cretaceous era. Above this intrusive rock layer is a volcanic cover from the late Cenozoic era that includes andesite from the Santa Lucía Range, and Esperanza basalt. The Santa Rosalia Formation is beneath this volcanic cover which consists of shallow-water marine deposits identified by fossiliferous sandstone. Above all these layers, the region consists of a variety of pyroclastic particles from different stages of its most recent volcanic activity. These rocks produced at Las Tres Vírgenes volcanic region have characteristics like those of the calc–alkaline magma series. The volcanic complex has also emitted andesitic to dacitic magmas from 300 to 22ka.

This complex of three stratovolcanoes began as mostly dacitic lava flows and domes which resulted in the formation of El Viejo (300 Ka). Volcanic activity later shifted southwest forming El Azufre (173 Ka). Finally, at about 112 Ka, volcanism migrated southwest yet again beginning the creation of El Virgen. Up until 22Ka, El Virgen initially had the largest cone of the three volcanoes at 31.2 km3. The next largest was El Viejo at 4.2 km3 and lastly, El Azufre at 3.8 km3.

== El Viejo ==
El Viejo is the oldest from the volcanoes that make up the Tres Virgenes. It is made up of three lava domes which are in oldest to youngest : the lower viejo dacite, puerta dacite, and the upper viejo dacite. The Lower Viejo dacite dome is overlain by the puerta dacite dome and has a 0.1 km thick lobe-like lava. The dome has light gray lava with mottled structure due to the abundance of enclaves which are dark gray aphanitic that come in different shapes. The puerta dacite is well exposed compared to the other two domes. The dome is covered by a blocky lava surface with a crumble breccia at the base. It is 0.19 km thick and the lava contains sub-rounded 10 cm enclaves. The last dome being the youngest is the Upper Viejo dacite and this dome has a blocky surface as well and it contains sub-rounded enclaves. The average thickness of the dome is 0.26 km.

== El Azufre ==
This volcano has block and ash flow which pyroclastic fans that are dissected by radial drainage and at the fan toe is limited by volcaniclastic deposits. The average thickness is 0.1 km and it covers an area of 7.5 km. Then it also consists of a dacite central dome which is located atop the Azufre Volcano. It has a height of 0.3 km and an exposed area of 0.78 km. The lava varies from dark-gray to pinkish-gray and the dome shows sub-rounded lava blocks with dark gray enclaves.

== El Virgen ==
El Virgen is by far the most conspicuous of the three. It is made up of at least 6 scoria cones all spread out around the Virgen volcano. Three of these cones are on the southern flank of El Azufre and they have elongated and coalesced shapes and are crudely aligned in N-S direction. They cover an area of 0.46 km and averages a height of 0.06 km. These scoria cones consist of massive grain supported poorly sorted fallout beds. It also consists of 6 andesite lava being the Cueva de Gel, Lower Pintos, Upper Pintos, Lower Virgen, Pintos dacite, and Upper Virgen andesite lava. Adding to the andesites has one neck which serves as a feeding vent of the volcano and is almost entirely covered by younger deposits of the volcano. The Virgen dacite lava cone is the only cone and represents the main structure of the La Virgen stratocone. As well as there being many andesite lavas there are 4 lava domes. The Mezquital dacite lava dome is made up of two and they are located on the southern apron of the Virgen volcano. El Virgen is by far the most complex of the three volcanoes as you can see by everything that it consists of such as the lavas, cones, and domes.

== Eruption history ==
The last eruption of the volcanoes in the complex was of El Vírgen, but the date is disputed. A map drawn by the Croatian Jesuit missionary Ferdinand Konščak contains a reference to an eruption in 1746. Radiometric datings, however, do not agree with this. A charcoal fragment found in a volcanic deposit was dated at approximately 6515 years before present. A basaltic lava flow, which must be younger than the actual eruption, was dated at approximately 24 thousand years B.P., which agrees with a dating of tephra fragments from El Vírgen that yielded an age of approximately 36 thousand years B.P. for the eruption.

== See also ==
- Volcanoes of east-central Baja California
- List of volcanoes in Mexico
- List of Ultras of Mexico
- List of mountain peaks of Mexico
