= Kiliwa people =

Indigenous people in Baja California, Mexico

Kiliwa
Ko’leeu
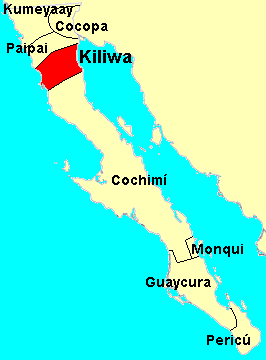

Regions with significant populations
- Baja California

Languages
- Kiliwa language, Spanish

Related ethnic groups
- Nyakipa

The Kiliwa (Kiliwa: Ko’leeu) are an Indigenous people of Mexico living in northern Baja California. Historically they occupied a territory lying between the Cochimí on the south and the Paipai on the north, and extending from San Felipe on the Gulf of California to San Quintín on the Pacific coast. Their traditional language is the Kiliwa language.

The Nyakipa have sometimes been distinguished from the Kiliwa as a separate ethnolinguistic group within the southwestern portion of what is here considered Kiliwa territory. The limited linguistic evidence that is available for the Nyakipa indicates that they spoke the same language as the eastern Kiliwa.

== Prehistory ==
Little archaeological research has as yet been done within Kiliwa territory. A partial exception is a sampling program of systematic survey along the west coast between El Rosario and San Quintín by Jerry D. Moore.

Radiocarbon dates and Clovis points from farther south on the peninsula suggest that the initial occupation to the north must have occurred prior to 11,000 years ago.

== History ==
The Kiliwa first encountered Europeans when Juan Rodríguez Cabrillo reached the San Quintín area in 1542. There were few subsequent contacts during the next two centuries. The Jesuit missionary-explorer Wenceslaus Linck came overland from the south into the eastern part of Kiliwa territory in 1766. The expedition to establish Spanish settlements in California, led by Gaspar de Portolà and Junípero Serra passed through the western portions.

The Dominican mission of Santo Domingo was founded in Kiliwa territory near the coast in 1775. It was followed by an inland mission of San Pedro Mártir in 1794. By around the time of Mexican independence in 1821, the population at the Kiliwa missions had sharply declined.

In 1929, Meigs reported that only 36 adult Kiliwa were then living, primarily at three settlements around Arroyo León, at San Isidoro, and in Valle Trinidad. Twenty years later in 1949, Hohenthal found 30 adult Kiliwa living at four settlements, including Arroyo León, Agua Caliente, La Parra, and Tepí.

== Population ==
Meigs suggested that the aboriginal population of the Kiliwa was about 1,300 individuals, or a density of about 0.3 persons per square kilometer. He excluded the southwestern "Nyakipa" territory from his estimates, which would raise the total to at least 2,000. Meigs considered his estimate to be a "conservative" one. However, Roger C. Owen has argued that Meigs' population estimates were substantially too high. They currently live in the Ensenada Municipality (settlements of Arroyo de León (Ejido Kiliwas), Ejido San Francisco R. Serrano (Valle San Matías), Ensenada, Francisco Zarco (Guadalupe), Juntas Neji, La Zorra, Lázaro Cárdenas (Valle de la Trinidad), Licenciado Gustavo Díaz Ordaz, Parcela Número 19 (Familia Castro Ejido Nalta), and Rancho las Pinzas).

== Culture ==
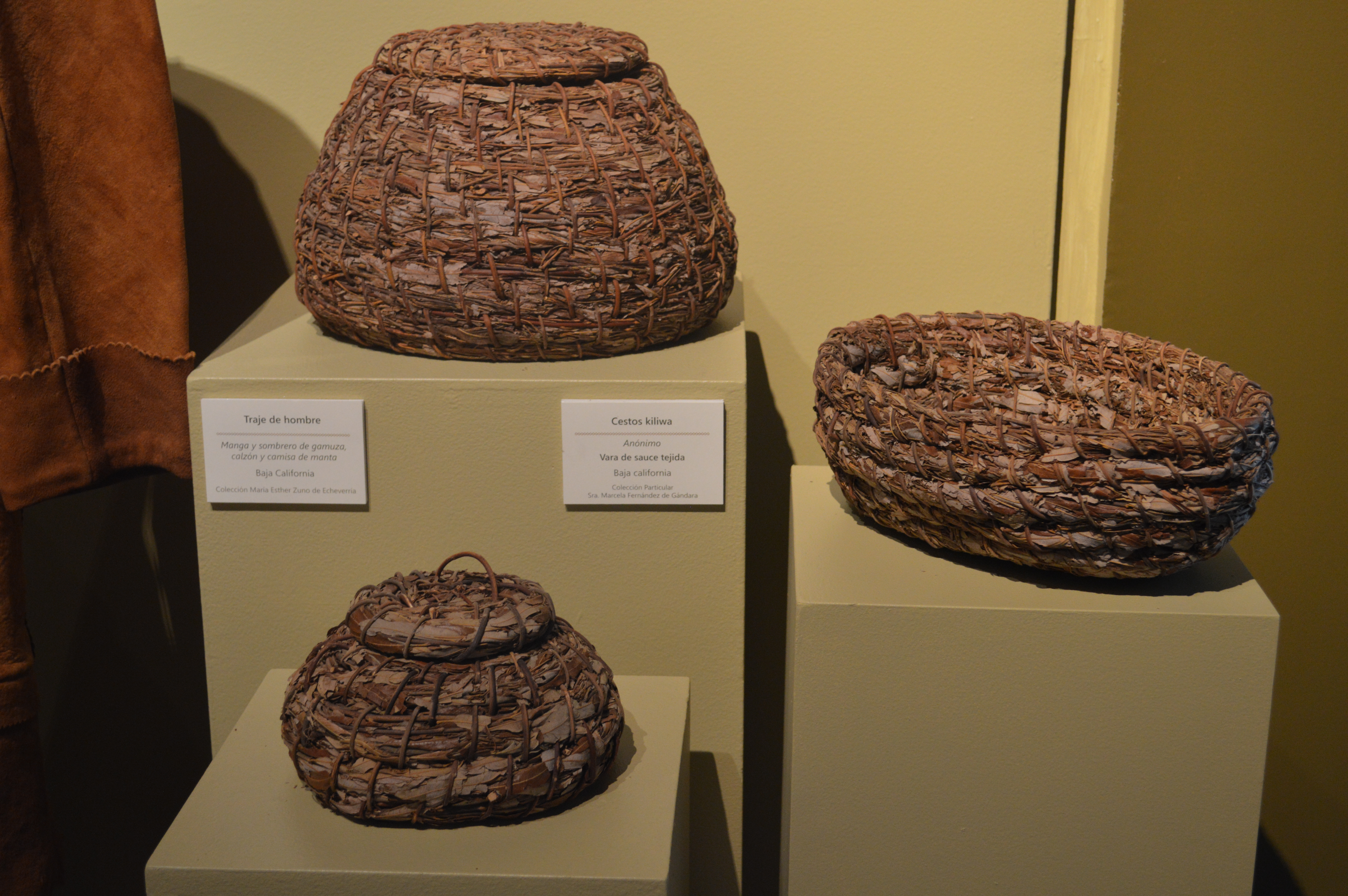
Kiliwa willow baskets at the Museo de Arte Popular in Mexico City

Information about the cultural practices of the pre-contact Kiliwa comes from a variety of sources. These include accounts of early explorers, such as Juan Rodríguez Cabrillo and Sebastián Vizcaíno; from late eighteenth and early nineteenth century observers, such as Luis Sales and José Longinos Martínez; and from twentieth century ethnographers, including Peveril Meigs, William D. Hohenthal, and Jesús Ángel Ochoa Zazueta.

=== Subsistence ===
Aboriginal Kiliwa subsistence was based on hunting and gathering of natural animal and plants rather than on agriculture. At least two dozen different plants were food resources, and many others were used for medicine or as materials for construction or craft products. Pit-roasted Agave (mezcal; maal) was the most important plant food. In the fall season, harvesting of acorns and pine nuts from the higher-elevation portions of Kiliwa territory was a major activity.

Rabbits and deer were the most important animal food sources, but a wide range of others were also hunted, including pronghorn antelope, bighorn sheep, medium-sized mammals such as mountain lions, many small mammal species, birds, reptiles, fish, and shellfish. Jackrabbits and quail were hunted communally, by being driven into nets. Treks were made to San Felipe on the east coast to harvest fish and shellfish and to collect salt.

Crop growing and stock raising were introduced during the historic period. Another highly valued food resource that was introduced during the historic period was wild honey.

=== Material culture ===
The traditional material culture of the Kiliwa was not highly elaborate, as would be expected for a seasonally mobile group.

- Structures included semi-subterranean houses with willow poles and thatching, ramadas, and sweat houses.
- Hunting equipment included willow bows; arrows with carrizo reed shafts, wooden foreshafts, and stone points; wooden throwing sticks; and agave fiber nets.
- Processing equipment included manos and metates for grinding seeds, wooden drills and hearths for making fire, and pottery and basketry for cooking, storing, and transporting.
- Clothing was generally lacking for men. Women wore deer hide aprons and reed caps. Both sexes wore agave fiber sandals. Rabbitskin blankets provided warmth, and human hair capes were used in ceremonies. Cradles were used to transport infants.

=== Social organization ===
Traditional leadership roles in communities and kin groups were held on a hereditary basis, but subject to an assessment of the individual leader's competence. Leaders' authority does not seem to have been extensive.

Kinship and community membership seems to have been defined to a large extent on the basis of patrilineal inheritance. Two levels of patrilineages (or clans, sibs) were recognized, corresponding to the šimułs of other western Yuman groups. Maselkwa were the smaller, more strongly localized groups. Several maselkwa might collectively constitute an ichiupu. On the broadest level, all Kiliwa were believed to be descended from four mythic brothers, the sons of the creator.

Social recreations included a variety of games: racing with balls, shinny, top spinning, archery, dice, a guessing game, and, most importantly, peón. Music was produced by singing and by instruments, including flutes, rattles, clappers, and bullroarers.

=== Ceremonies ===
Shamans were believed to be able to effect magical cures of disease or injuries, or to cause them. They presided at some religious ceremonies, and they were thought to transform themselves into animals or birds and to bring rain.

Most documented Kiliwa ceremonies were linked to rites of passage in the lives of individuals:

- Birth involved various taboos or special requirements, but it was primarily a private family matter. The father observed a couvade.
- Boys' initiation for groups of boys aged around 15 years was marked by the nose-piercing ceremony (mipípŭsá) and other activities extending over two months.
- Girls' initiation at the time of first menstruation involved being baked in ashes for five days, washed in cold water for five days, and made to observe various prescriptions and taboos.
- Marriage involved little ceremony, other than the groom giving gifts to the bride's parents. Marrying up to two wives was permitted, and divorce was easy for either party.
- Death was the focus of the most elaborate Kiliwa ceremonies, occurring both immediately after an individual's death and as subsequent collective mourning observances. Talking to the dead and burning his possessions are among the formal actions.

=== Traditional narratives ===
Traditional narratives are conventionally classed as myths, legends, tales, and oral histories. The oral literature recorded for the Kiliwa includes narratives that can be assigned to each of these categories.

The Kiliwa creation myth conspicuously diverges from those of the other Yuman-speaking groups. However, the Kiliwa name for the creator, Metipá, recalls similar figures in other Yuman myths.

==== Sources of traditional narratives ====
- Meigs, Peveril, III. 1939. The Kiliwa Indians of Lower California. Iberoamericana No. 15. University of California, Berkeley.(Myths narrated by Emiliano Uchurte and José Espinosa, ca. 1928–1936, pp. 64–82.)
- Mixco, Mauricio J. 1976. "Kiliwa Texts". International Journal of American Linguistics Native American Text Series 1:92–101.
- Mixco, Mauricio J. 1983. Kiliwa Texts: "When I Have Donned My Crest of Stars" University of Utah Anthropological Papers No. 107. Salt Lake City. (Myths and legends narrated by Rufino Ochurte and Braulio Espinosa after 1966.)
- Mixco, Mauricio J. 1993. "Kiliwa Mountain Sheep Traditions". In Counting Sheep: Twenty Ways of Seeing Desert Bighorn Sheep, edited by Gary Paul Nabhan, pp. 37–41.
- Ochoa Zazueta, Jesús Ángel. 1978. Los kiliwa y el mundo se hizo así. Instituto Nacional Indigenista, Mexico City. (Ochoa's account of Kiliwa traditions is inconsistent with Meigs' data and other Yuman accounts, and its authenticity has been questioned by Mixco.)
