= San Borja volcanic field =

Volcanic field in Baja California, Mexico

Coordinates: 28°30′N 113°30′W

San Borja volcanic field is a volcanic field in Baja California, northeast of the Vizcaino Peninsula. It is formed by a plateau of lava flows and a number of scoria cones. The field started erupting over twelve million years ago and has endured several changes in regional tectonics.

== Geomorphology and geography ==
San Borja is part of a province of monogenetic volcanic fields that formed on Baja California after cessation of subduction west of the peninsula. These volcanoes have erupted magmas ranging from adakite to andesite and their origin is unknown; various processes such as changes in the tectonic stress field and the formation of slab windows have been proposed. The slab window theory was considered the main cause of voclanism at first, but later research has indicated that parts of the slab still exist beneath Baja California.

The San Borja volcanic field covers a surface of over 1,600 square kilometres (620 sq mi) and encompasses at least 227 individual centres. There is a meridiolan zonation, with the southern part of the field dominated by lava flows that cap mesas and the northern part containing individual scoria cones and probable fissure vents also associated with lava flows. Miocene lava flows are tectonically tilted and partly surrounded by Pliocene lava flows. The various vents are aligned on usually northwest-southeast trending lineaments.

== Geology ==
The tectonic history of Baja California was greatly influenced by the collision of the spreading ridge between the Pacific Plate and the Farallon Plate with North America during the Oligocene. Before that time, the crust of the Pacific Ocean had been subducting beneath North America; now two triple junctions formed at the contact site with the San Andreas Fault in between. Later in the Miocene, spreading between the two plates and the subduction west of Baja California ceased about 12.5 million years ago, with the spreading ridge being either subducted or just abandoned outside of the previous trench. 6 million years ago the East Pacific Rise penetrated inland into the Gulf of California, separating Baja California from the North America Plate.

=== Local ===
The basement is formed by metamorphic rocks of Miocene age. These were intruded during the Cretaceous by diorite-granite intrusions such as the Peninsular Ranges Batholith and covered by sediments during the Tertiary and volcanites during the Miocene. The oldest volcanic formation is the Salto formation from 28 million years ago, tuffs presumably from the Sierra Madre Occidental that are dated between 27-23 million years ago and the calc-alkaline volcanic arc Comondú formation of 25-10 million years ago.

=== Composition ===
The characteristic volcanic rock of Baja California are magnesium-rich basaltic andesite and andesite which are known as bajaite. While San Borja lavas are calc-alkaline, there is a noticeable difference between volcanites erupted at San Borja over 11 years ago and those erupted about 4 million years ago.

== Eruptive history ==
Argon-argon dating has yielded evidence of three distinct phases of volcanic activity at San Borja: An older phase before 12.5 million years ago coinciding with the ongoing subduction which was followed by individual pulses of activity until 6 million years ago and coincided with phases of activity in other Baja California volcanoes. A younger phase commenced later and peaked 3 million years ago, lasting into the Holocene. These phases of volcanic activity occur just after major changes of tectonic conditions.
