= Sierra de San Borja =

Mountain range on the Baja California Peninsula of Mexico

- Location within Baja California Location within Mexico

Geography
- Location: Baja California, Mexico
- Range coordinates: 28°22′N 113°21′W

The Sierra de San Borja, also known as Sierra La Libertad, is a mountain range on the Baja California Peninsula of Mexico. It is one of the Peninsular Ranges which form the backbone of Baja California. The Sierra de San Borja is located between 28° North latitude (the border of the states of Baja California and Baja California Sur) and 29° North latitude (Highway 12). The highest point of the Sierra is Cerro La Sandia, 1,775 metres (5,823 ft) in elevation located at 28°24′25″N 113°26′18″W.

The Sierra de San Borja is nearly uninhabited. Desert vegetation prevails with only a few water sources. Tourists visit the San Francisco Borja Mission (founded 1762) and the extensive prehistoric rock art scattered throughout the mountains.

== History ==
The inhabitants of the Sierra de San Borja when first visited by Jesuit Catholic missionaries early in the 18th century were Cochimí Indians, nomadic hunter-gatherers. In 1752. the Jesuits established the Santa Gertrudis Mission at the southern end of the Sierra de San Borja and in 1762 the San Francisco de Borja Adac Mission, Adac being the name of the Cochimí rancheria settlement at the site. At their most active in the 1760s, each of the missions attracted about 1,700 Cochimí as temporary residents, but those numbers were unsustainable and introduced European diseases rapidly caused a decline in the Indian population. Both missions were closed in the early 19th century, although a few people still live at the site of each mission and irrigate several acres of farmland.

== Climate ==
Most or all of the Sierra de San Borja has a hot desert climate: Bwh in the Köppen climate classification system. The mountain range does not capture enough precipitation to support the oak-pine forests of the higher and more humid mountain ranges in northern and southern Baja California The climatic averages for San Ignacio (near the San Borja mission and not to be confused with San Ignacio, Baja California Sur) are typical of the region at the lower elevations: hot summer temperatures (but moderated by the nearby Pacific Ocean and Gulf of California) and unpredictable and irregular precipitation, mostly in the winter months,

Climate data for San Ignacio, Baja California, 28° 44′ N 113° 45′ W. Elevation: 445 m (1,460 ft)
Month	Jan	Feb	Mar	Apr	May	Jun	Jul	Aug	Sep	Oct	Nov	Dec	Year
Mean daily maximum °C (°F)	21.8 (71.2)	23.1 (73.6)	23.8 (74.8)	25.8 (78.4)	27.6 (81.7)	31.3 (88.3)	34.3 (93.7)	34.4 (93.9)	33.2 (91.8)	29.2 (84.6)	25.8 (78.4)	22.6 (72.7)	27.7 (81.9)
Daily mean °C (°F)	15.0 (59.0)	15.8 (60.4)	16.3 (61.3)	17.6 (63.7)	19.1 (66.4)	22.1 (71.8)	25.6 (78.1)	26.3 (79.3)	24.8 (76.6)	21.4 (70.5)	18.6 (65.5)	15.8 (60.4)	19.9 (67.8)
Mean daily minimum °C (°F)	8.2 (46.8)	8.6 (47.5)	8.8 (47.8)	9.3 (48.7)	10.5 (50.9)	12.9 (55.2)	16.9 (62.4)	18.2 (64.8)	17.5 (63.5)	13.7 (56.7)	11.4 (52.5)	9.0 (48.2)	12.1 (53.8)
Average precipitation mm (inches)	17 (0.7)	15 (0.6)	11 (0.4)	4 (0.2)	1 (0.0)	0 (0)	4 (0.2)	6 (0.2)	15 (0.6)	8 (0.3)	7 (0.3)	25 (1.0)	113 (4.4)
Source: Weatherbase: San Ignacio, Baja California

== Rock paintings ==
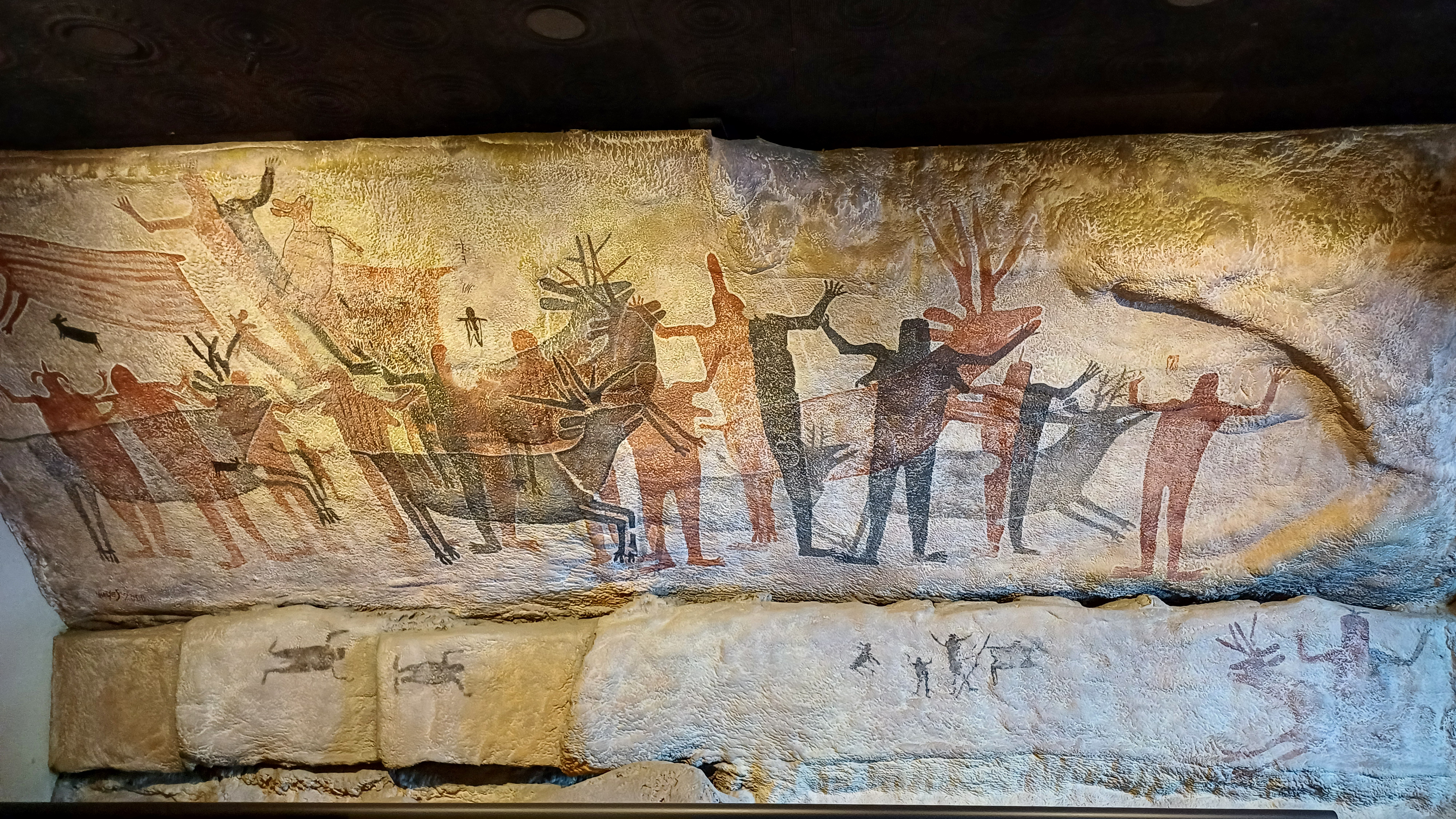
Replica of nn example of Great Mural rock art.

The Sierra de San Borja is the northernmost outpost of the "Great Mural" rock art of the central Baja California mountains. In explorations in the 1970s, author Harry W. Crosby found six major sites of Great Mural rock art southeast of the San Borja mission. Several others have since been discovered. Great mural rock Art consists of prehistoric paintings of humans and other animals, often larger than life-size, on the walls and ceilings of natural rock shelters.

The number of Great Mural sites in the San Borja mountains is fewer than further south in the Sierra de San Francisco where the rock paintings have been declared a World Heritage Site by UNESCO. The area near the San Borja Mission is a dividing line between the Great Mural rock art to the south and the more abstract style of rock painting found to the north. The paintings of the Great Mural rock art of the Sierra de San Borja are smaller than more southerly works, less diverse in their subject matter, and are always colored in shades of red. Given their similarity to each other, Crosby speculated that the San Borja rock paintings were created by a single ethnic group and within a relatively short period of time.

Jesuit missionaries became aware of some of the Great Murals in the eighteenth century but the local Cochimí Indians disclaimed any knowledge of their origin. The dates that the Great Murals were painted is in dispute, with post-400 BCE being most widely accepted. but radiocarbon dating at the site of San Borjitas (south of the Sierra de San Borja) suggest that the murals at that site may be as old as 5500 BCE.

== Conservation ==
The Sierra de San Borja and neighboring mountain ranges are recognized as a Priority Region for the Conservation of Biodiversity by the government of Mexico. The Region, called Sierras la Libertad-La Assemblea, has an area of 5,192 square kilometres (2,005 sq mi).
