= Visita de Calamajué =

18th-century Spanish visita in Baja California, Mexico

- Location in Baja California Location in Mexico
- Location: San Quintín Municipality, Baja California, Mexico
- Coordinates: 29°25′16″N 114°11′42″W
- Name as founded: Visita de Calamajué
- Founded: October 1766
- Founded by: Ferdinand Konščak and Wenceslaus Linck
- Founding Order: Jesuits
- Native tribe(s) Spanish name(s): Cochimí

The Visita de Calamajué was a Catholic visita located in the indigenous Cochimí settlement of Calamajué in Baja California, Mexico. The visita was founded by Jesuit missionaries Ferdinand Konščak and Wenceslaus Linck in October 1766 as an extension of Misión San Francisco Borja.

== History ==
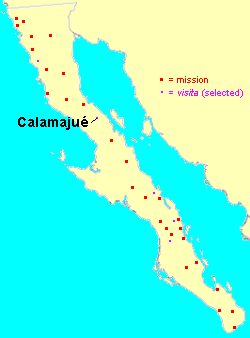
Location of Visita de Calamajué among the Spanish missions in Baja California

About 90 kilometers north of San Borja, Calamajué was found by the Jesuit missionary-explorer Ferdinand Konščak in 1751 and revisited in 1766 by Wenceslaus Linck. It was intended to become the site of Mission Santa María.

In October 1766, the Jesuits founded their 17th mission here. In just a few months, the crops failed due to the highly mineralized water available. However, a more suitable site for the mission was found about 50 kilometers farther north, at Cabujakaamung, following seven months of mission activity at Calamajué.

Calamajué also served as a estancia along El Camino Real Misionero between Misión San Francisco Borja and Misión Santa María de los Ángeles.

== Preservation ==
Today, a complex of adobe ruins and rock corrals are all that remain of the original visita.

== See also ==
- Spanish missions in Baja California
- List of Jesuit sites
