= Mission San Borja Hot Springs =

Thermal springs

- Misión San Francisco Borga Aguas Caliente
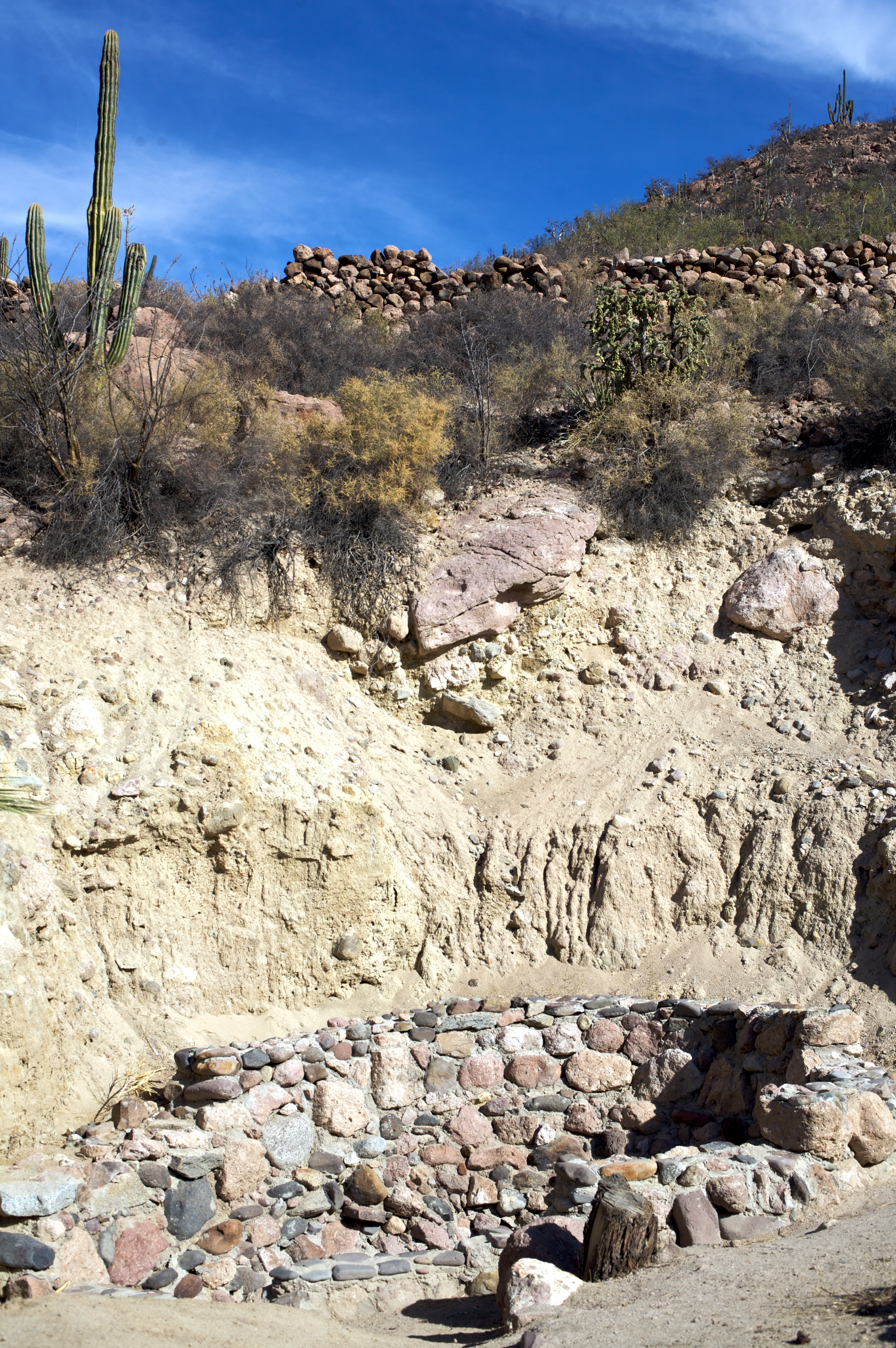
- Interactive map of Mission San Borja Hot Springs
- Coordinates: 28°44′27.8″N 113°45′13″W
- Elevation: 2,200 ft (670 m)
- Type: geothermal
- Temperature: 96 °F (36 °C)

Mission San Borja Hot Springs are located on the grounds of the historical Misión San Francisco Borja near the town of Rosarito in Baja California, Mexico.

== History ==
In 1752, the Jesuit missionary, Georg Retz arrived at the springs and ordered the building of a visita or subordinate mission for Misión Santa Gertrudis, at a San Borja Adác site. In 1758, Retz sent a group to confirm the hot water springs and cold springs at San Borja Adác.

The hot mineral springs are located on the site of the Spanish Misión San Francisco Borja founded in 1762 by the Jesuit priest and explorer Wenceslaus Linck who worked with the local indigenous Northern Cochimí people who had been Christianized by Retz.

The rock-lined soaking pool at the source was built in the early 1880s by the missionaries.

== Location ==
The springs are located approximately 20 miles East of the town of Rosarito. The rock pools are located next to the mission cornfields. The missions fields were watered with the run-off from the spring mixed with cold water from a nearby creek.

== Water profile ==
The hot mineral water emerges from the ground at 96 °F.

== See also ==
- List of hot springs in the United States
- List of hot springs in the world
