= Misión Santa María de los Ángeles =

18th-century Spanish mission in Baja California, Mexico

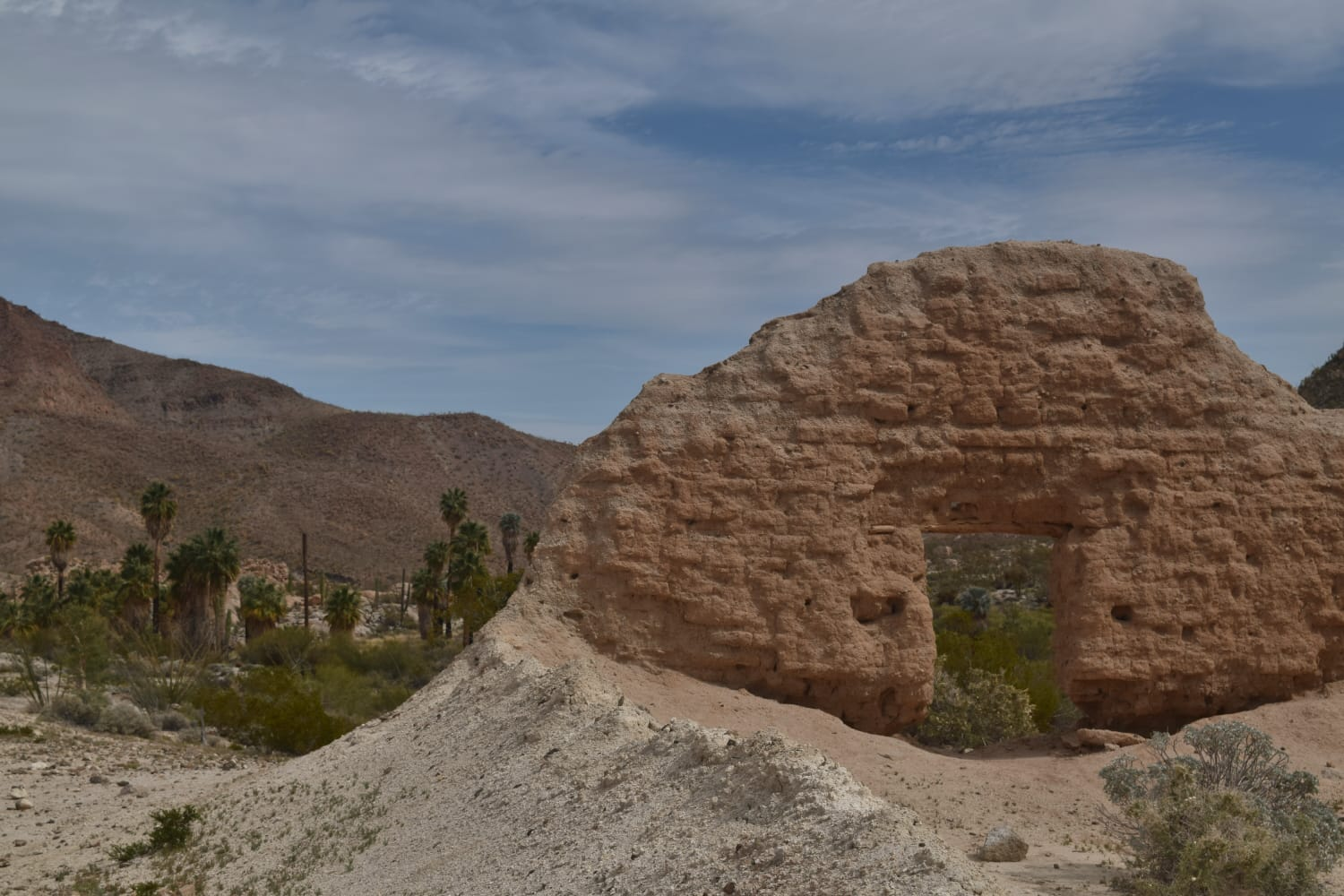
- Santa Maria de los Angeles in 2023

- Location in Baja California Location in Mexico
- Location: Near Cataviña; Baja California, Mexico
- Coordinates: 29°43′54″N 114°32′50″W
- Patron: Saint Mary of the Angels
- Founded: 1767
- Founded by: Victoriano Arnés
- Founding Order: Jesuits

Mission Santa María de los Ángeles was the last of the missions established by the Jesuits in Baja California, Mexico, in 1767. The mission was named after Saint Maria of the Angels, as well as after Maria Ana Antonia Luisa de Borja-Centelles y Fernández de Córdoba, Duchess of Gandía, who donated money to the Baja California missions in 1747.

== History ==
The site chosen was the Cochimí settlement of Cabujakaamung, also spelled as Kabujakaamung or Cabuja-Camang ("arroyo of crags"), west of Bahía San Luis Gonzaga near the Gulf of California coast, about 22 kilometers east of Rancho Santa Inés, and south of Cataviña.

The mission site was visited by the Jesuit missionary-explorers Ferdinand Konščak and Wenceslaus Linck. Victoriano Arnés founded the mission in 1767 to replace the unsatisfactory site of Calamajué, which did not have good water sources, only months before the Jesuits were expelled from Baja California. After the Jesuit expulsion, the Franciscan order took control of the missions.

After the establishment of Mission San Fernando Velicatá in 1769, Santa María was reduced to the status of a visita, or subordinate mission station. The visita was abandoned in 1818 due to the lack of suitable land for crops and cattle. Ruined structural walls and rock corrals survive at the site.

== See also ==
- Spanish missions in California
- List of Jesuit sites
