= Great Mural Rock Art =

Instance of prehistoric paintings in the Baja California, Mexico

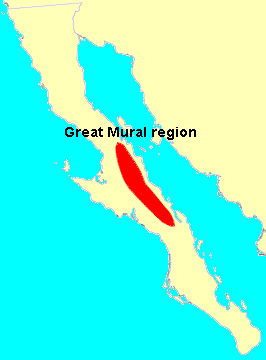

Great Mural Rock Art consists of prehistoric paintings of humans and other animals, often larger than life-size, on the walls and ceilings of natural rock shelters in the mountains of northern Baja California Sur and southern Baja California, Mexico. This group of monuments comprises the site Rock Paintings of Sierra de San Francisco, which is included on the UNESCO World Heritage List.

== Characteristics ==
The rock art may be either monochrome or polychrome. Red and black were the colors most frequently used, but white, pink, orange, and green also occur.

The most common figures are humans and deer, but a variety of other animals, such as rabbits, bighorn sheep, birds, fish, and snakes are also represented. The human images often include stylized headdresses. A minority of human images are shown with sexual characteristics, such as male genitalia or female breasts. A minority of human and animal images are overlain with depictions of projectiles (presumably arrows or atlatl darts).

The images are essentially silhouettes, without representational details inside their outlines. Instead, geometrical patterns such as stripes or bands of different colors are used. A dorsal/ventral (front-facing) perspective is employed for humans, turtles, birds, and most fish, while a lateral perspective is used for deer and most other animals.

Overpainting of earlier by later images is very common. Some murals seem to show intentional composition in their arrangements of multiple images, but in many cases the figures seem to have been painted individually, without regard to other nearby (or underlying) images.

== Distribution ==
The Great Murals occur in the sierras of Guadalupe, San Francisco, San Juan, and San Borja in the central part of the Baja California peninsula. To the north and south their place is taken by other, less spectacular rock art styles. Within the Great Mural area as well, pictographs and petroglyphs belonging to other styles are present.

The Great Murals lie within the ethnohistoric territory of the Cochimí, and they have been commonly linked with the late prehistoric Comondú Complex, although the Cochimí denied to eighteenth-century Jesuit missionaries that they were responsible for the paintings. Recent radiocarbon studies, both on materials recovered from archaeological deposits in the rockshelters and on materials in the paintings themselves, have suggested that the Great Murals may have a time range extending as far back as 7,500 years ago.

== Interpretations ==
No consensus exists about the motivations that led to the painting of the Great Murals. Among the contexts suggested for their production have been hunting magic, warfare, shamans' traces, weather control, and ancestor veneration.

== Studies ==
The existence of the Great Murals was noted by Jesuit missionaries José Mariano Rotea and Francisco Escalante in the eighteenth century. The first scientific studies were made between 1889 and 1913 by a French naturalist, Léon Diguet. Mexican journalist Fernando Jordan and archaeologists Barbro Dahlgren and Javier Romero reported on Great Mural sites in the early 1950s.

The Great Murals came to popular attention in the United States through a 1962 Life magazine article by mystery writer Erle Stanley Gardner. Since then, numerous investigators have documented and analyzed the sites. For instance, Eve Ewing has been studying the art for 50 years and has made over a hundred trips to view the different paintings. Particularly notable have been the extensive contributions from Clement W. Meighan, Campbell Grant, Harry W. Crosby, Enrique Hambleton, Justin R. Hyland, and María de la Luz Gutiérrez.
