= José Mariano Rotea =

Mexican Jesuit missionary (1732–1799)

José Mariano Rotea SJ (1732–1799) was a Jesuit missionary on the Baja California peninsula who played a key role in the rediscovery of the peninsula's prehistoric Great Murals rock art.

== Biography ==
José Mariano Rotea was born in Mexico City and served as missionary at San Ignacio in what is now the state of Baja California Sur, Mexico, from 1759 until the Jesuits were expelled from New Spain in 1768. He lived in exile in Bologna, Italy, until his death.

Rotea wrote an account of his observations and speculations concerning the remains of the peninsula's prehistoric inhabitants. This was included in a manuscript by his fellow missionary Miguel del Barco and published by the Jesuit historian Francisco Javier Clavijero. One subject of Rotea's account was an hypothesized race of prehistoric giants, supposedly attested by oral traditions, outsized living areas, and paintings placed high on the walls or ceilings of rock shelters. In his investigations into this matter, Rotea carried out what were probably the earliest archaeological excavations on the peninsula, in order to recover bones from a supposed giant. Of more lasting influence was his first reporting of the existence large painted human and animal figures in the region's rock shelters, in a style later labelled the Great Murals.
