= Intergovernmental relations of California =

The U.S. state government of California maintains intergovernmental relations with other U.S. states and subnational governments outside of the United States.

== Domestic intergovernmental relations ==
=== Interstate relations ===
The state government maintains several interstate compacts and executive agreements with other U.S. states.

California is a part to the Colorado River Compact which governs water distribution among the seven states which share the drainage basin of the Colorado River.

=== Relations with indigenous communities ===
California is home to 109 federally recognized tribes in the state and over forty self-identified tribes or tribal bands that have applied for federal recognition.

== Foreign relations ==
=== Pan-Californian relations ===
California shares an international border with the Mexican state of Baja California. California is a member of the Commission of the Californias, a tri-lateral forum for cooperation with the Mexican states of Baja California and Baja California Sur.

=== Trade offices ===
The Governor's Office of Business and Economic Development, formerly the California Technology, Trade and Commerce Agency, maintains trade offices and coordinates business relations between the state government of California and governments abroad on a paradiplomatic basis.

=== List of sister states ===
The following is a list of sister-state relationships maintained by California through legislative resolutions or executive order.

Jurisdiction	Nation	Year	Type of agreement	Ref.
Taiwan	Republic of China	1983		
Jiangsu Province	China	1985		
Catalonia	Spain	1986		
South Korea	South Korea	1987	Friendship State Relationship	
Querétaro	Mexico	1988		
Provence-Alpes-Côte d'Azur	France	1990		
Khanty-Mansi Autonomous Okrug	Russia	1994		
Osaka Prefecture	Japan	1994	Cooperation Agreement	
Altai Republic	Russia	1995		
Umbria	Italy	1995		
Special Region of Yogyakarta	Indonesia	1995		
South Chungcheong Province	South Korea	1996		
Alberta	Canada	1997		
New South Wales	Australia	1997		
San Salvador Department	El Salvador	1998		
Baja California	Mexico	1999		
Cairo Governorate	Egypt	1999		
Inner Mongolia	China	1999	Friendship State Relationship	
Paraná (state)	Brazil	1999		
Western Cape	South Africa	2000		
Jalisco	Mexico	2000		
Punjab	India	2001		
Gujarat	India	2001		
Azores	Portugal	2002		
Baja California Sur	Mexico	2002		
Jeju Province	South Korea	2005		
Guangdong	China	2014		
Santa Fe Province	Argentina	2015		
Nayarit	Mexico	2017		
Baden-Württemberg	Germany	2018		
Syunik Province	Armenia	2022		
Punjab, Pakistan	Pakistan	2022		
Bulacan	Philippines	2023		
Lviv Oblast	Ukraine	2024		

== Immigration affairs ==
In 2015, Governor Jerry Brown created the office of Governor's Statewide Director of Immigration Integration, followed in 2022 by Governor Gavin Newsom's creation of the Council on Immigrant Integration and Talent, an interagency council.

== See also ==
- Category:Intergovernmental agreements of California
- Paradiplomacy
