= Misión de Nuestra Señora de Loreto Conchó =

17th-century Spanish mission in Baja California Sur, Mexico

Coordinates: 26°0′37″N 111°20′36″W

Mission Loreto
- Mission of Our Lady of Loreto Concho
- Misión de Nuestra Señora de Loreto Conchó
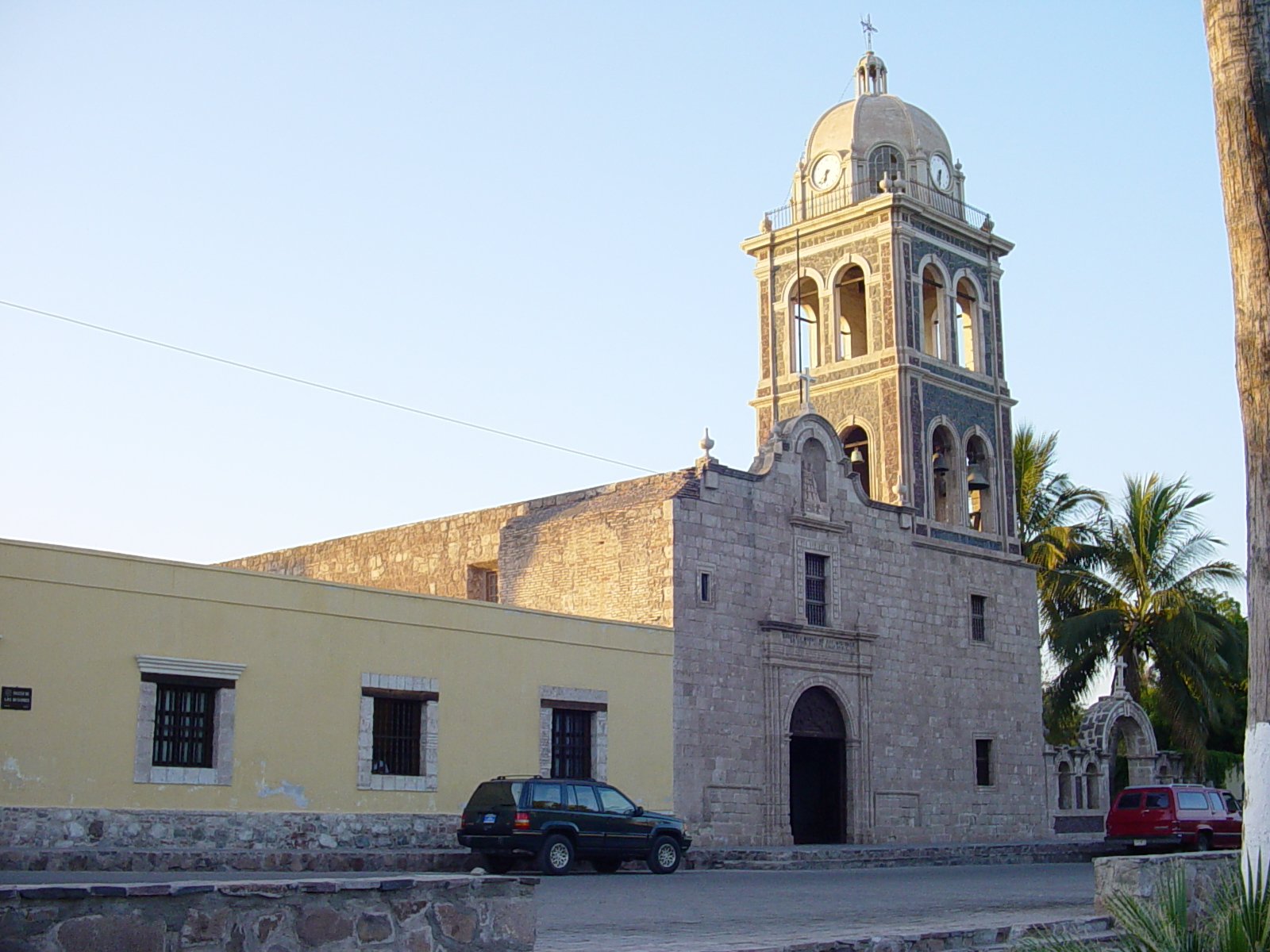
- Misión de Nuestra Señora de Loreto Conchó capilla, presidio and bell tower
- Mission Loreto
- Location: Loreto, Baja California Sur
- Country: Mexico
- Denomination: Roman Catholic Church

History
- Status: Church
- Founded: October 25th, 1697
- Founder: Juan María de Salvatierra

Architecture
- Functional status: Just Church functions
- Style: Baroque
- Groundbreaking: 1740
- Completed: 1744

Specifications
- Materials: Stone

Administration
- Division: Spanish missions in the Americas

Misión de Nuestra Señora de Loreto Conchó, or Mission Loreto, was founded on October 25, 1697, at the Monqui Native American (Indian) settlement of Conchó in the city of Loreto, Baja California Sur, Mexico. Established by the Catholic Church's Jesuit missionary Juan María de Salvatierra, Loreto was the first successful mission and Spanish town in Baja California.

The mission, with the exception of its essential Catholic church functions, closed in 1829.

== History ==
=== Attempts ===
After Hernán Cortés' initial, unsuccessful, 1535 attempt to found a colony in the Bay of Santa Cruz (today's La Paz, Baja California Sur), the next 150 years were marked by further unsuccessful efforts to colonize Baja California. The most nearly successful of these attempts was the 1683–1685 outpost at San Bruno, only about 20 kilometers north of Loreto, among the Cochimí. This failure by Admiral Isidro de Atondo y Antillón and the Jesuit missionary Eusebio Francisco Kino led directly to the success at Loreto 12 years later.

After many unsuccessful ventures in Baja California, the government of New Spain and the Spanish crown were reluctant to finance any further attempts. However, Kino's enthusiasm for this potential mission field was persistent. He ultimately persuaded some of his colleagues, including Salvatierra and the authorities in New Spain, to allow the Jesuits to return to the peninsula, but this time on their own responsibility and largely at their own expense.

By the start of 1697 everything was ready for the journey's start at the mouth of the Río Yaqui River in Sonora. Kino was unable to participate, because an Indian rebellion in Sonora required his presence on the mainland. Salvatierra would soon be joined at Loreto by Francisco María Piccolo, and they were supported from the mainland by the procurador for the mission, Juan de Ugarte.

=== Founding ===
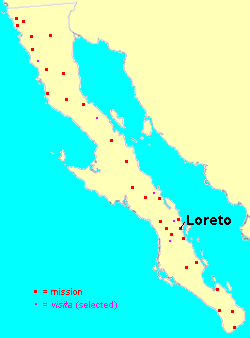
Loreto Mission in Baja California

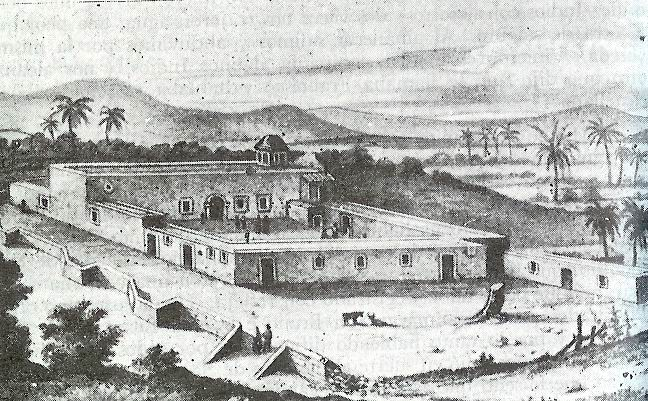
Misión de Nuestra Señora de Loreto Conchó in the 18th century.

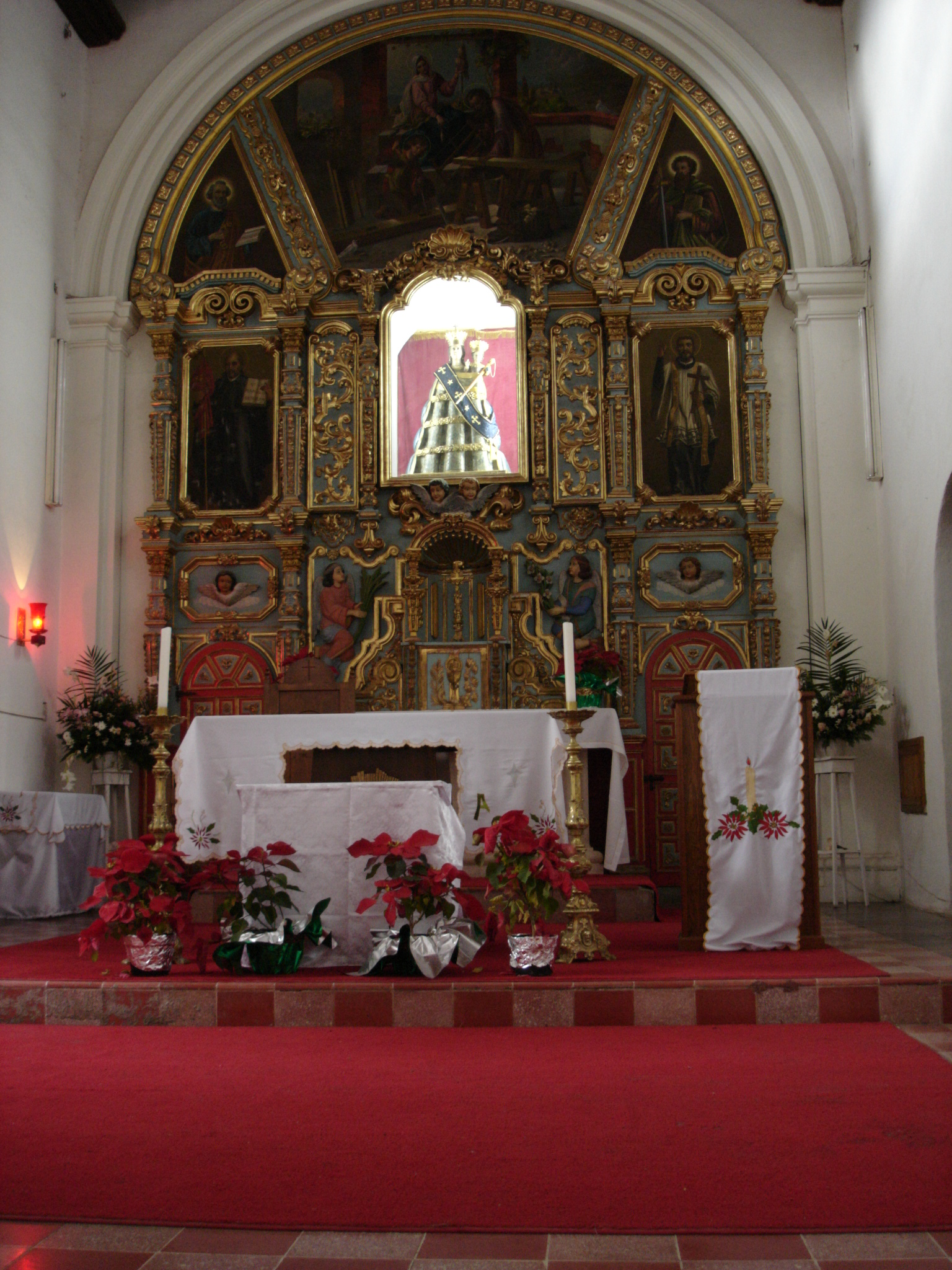
Natività della Beata Vergine Maria, Lady of Loreto, Marche, Italy main altar

On October 19, 1697, Salvatierra, with nine armed men, disembarked from the galley Santa Elvira at the place that the Indians called Coruncho (Cochimi: red-coloured mangrove). The site was distinguished by "a small patch of stunted shrubbery and a spring of fresh water, both rare luxuries in that inhospitable country". In the first days after their arrival, the missionary erected a modest structure that served as a chapel, to the front of which they affixed a wooden cross. On October 25 they carried the image of the Virgin of Our Lady of Loreto in a solemn procession, a ritual of faith that claimed the area as Spanish territory. Thus began the Mission Loreto.

A Monqui ranchería – a settlement whose population was usually 50 to 80 persons – was only a few hundred feet from where the Spanish decided to build the mission – with the only waterholes in the area between the two. The Spanish presence attracted more Indians; some were offered food in exchange for working and attending religious services, but the majority became hostile. On November 13, about 200 Indian men attacked the rudimentary fortress of the Spanish, launching arrows and rocks. The Spaniards fended them off with a mortar and two harquebusses. After about two hours, the attack ceased. Two Spaniards were slightly wounded and Salvatierra reported that they had killed and wounded several Indians.

Two days later a Spanish ship with supplies and reinforcements, including a second Jesuit priest, Francisco María Piccolo. arrived and, with the help of native workers paid with food, the Spaniards quickly erected a walled fortress called the Real Presidio de Loreto (Royal Fort of Loreto) that became the mission headquarters. Sporadic resistance by the Monqui to the mission continued but after a confrontation on Easter Sunday 1698 in which several Indians were killed or wounded, the Monqui accepted the presence of the mission. By late 1698, a total of 27 men -- priests, religious helpers, and soldiers, staffed the mission.

== Later history ==
The Loreto Mission would prove "worthless as a breadbasket" because of insufficient water to irrigate crops, but valuable as a base for expansion of the missionary enterprise and Spanish control of Baja California. The Spanish recognized that providing food to the Indians would draw them to the mission, but food had to be brought from the mainland of Mexico across the often stormy Gulf of California. Periodic shortages of food impacted the mission for decades. In 1699, the mission's need to find land suitable for agriculture led it to establish a new mission in a promising valley about 25 kilometres (16 mi) inland from Loreto at a place called Biaundó by the Cochimí Indian residents. In succeeding years, with Loreto as the base, the Jesuits created several new missions in south-central Baja California and then in more remote portions of the peninsula both to the north and to the south.

Loreto mission's stone church, which still stands, was begun in 1740 and completed in 1744. Loreto continued to be the headquarters for missionaries. even after the Jesuits were expelled from Baja California and replaced, first by the Franciscans in 1768 and then by the Dominicans in 1773. In 1769, the Loreto mission (now led by Franciscans under Junípero Serra) was the departure point for the land portion of the land/sea exploratory expedition led by Gaspar de Portolá. The joint military/missionary expedition traveled into today's U.S. state of California as far north as San Francisco Bay, establishing new Franciscan missions at Velicatá (Baja), San Diego and Monterey.

Mission Loreto came to an end in 1829, by which time the native population throughout Baja California had declined "to the point of near extinction."

== Population decline ==
By the end of 1698, one year after its founding, the Loreto mission had a population of about 100 Monqui families who had been converted to Christianity, nearly all of the Monqui who had lived along a 65-kilometre (40 mi) stretch of coast.This population of around 400 steadily decreased thereafter because of the toll from imported European diseases. By 1733, the Monqui population of Loreto was only 134 and the population was maintained thereafter at about that level only by bringing in Christian Indians from other parts of Baja California. In 1762, a Jesuit report recorded only 38 baptisms in the previous 18 years – but 309 deaths.

At the same time as the Monqui population declined, the transplanted Spanish, mestizo, and Indian population of Loreto increased. In 1730, the Jesuits recorded the non-Monqui population of Loreto at 175, which included 99 men and their wives and children. The men were employed as soldiers, sailors, artisans, teamsters, and cowboys. By 1770, the total population of Loreto was more than 400, of whom only about 120 were Indians indigenous to Baja California. The Monqui as a people and distinct culture were virtually extinct.

== Gallery ==
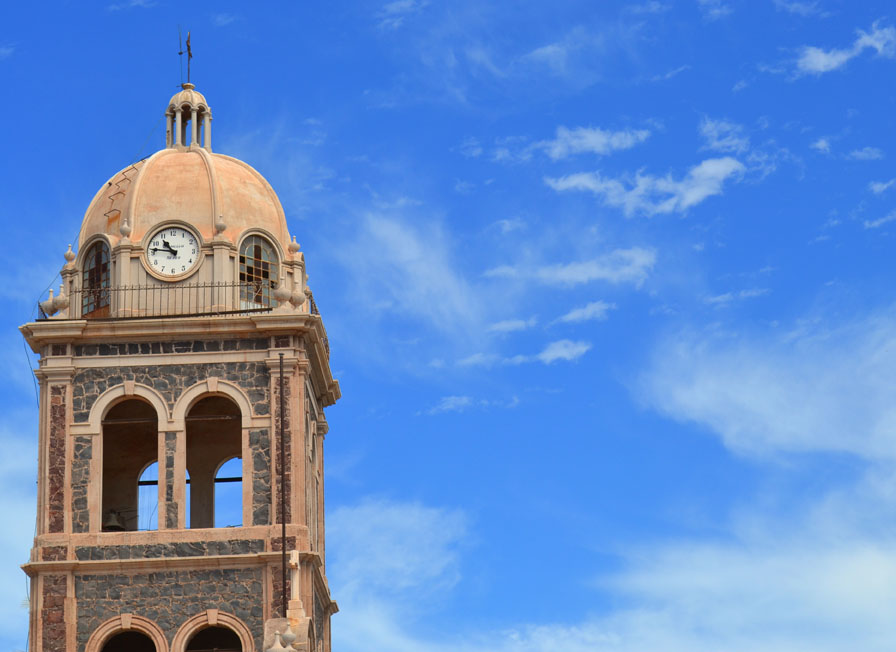
Bell tower added during city's main square modernizations in early 20th century

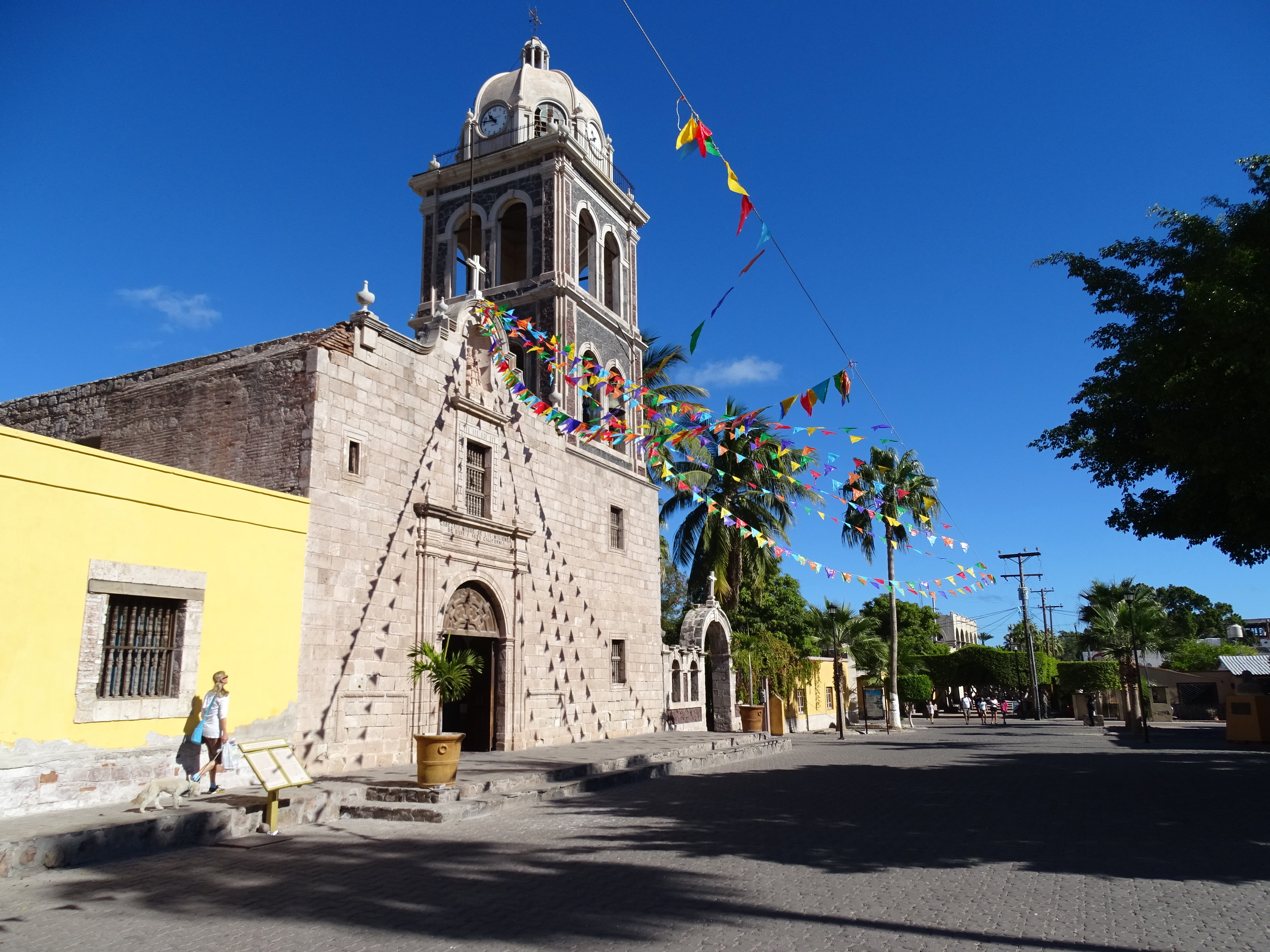

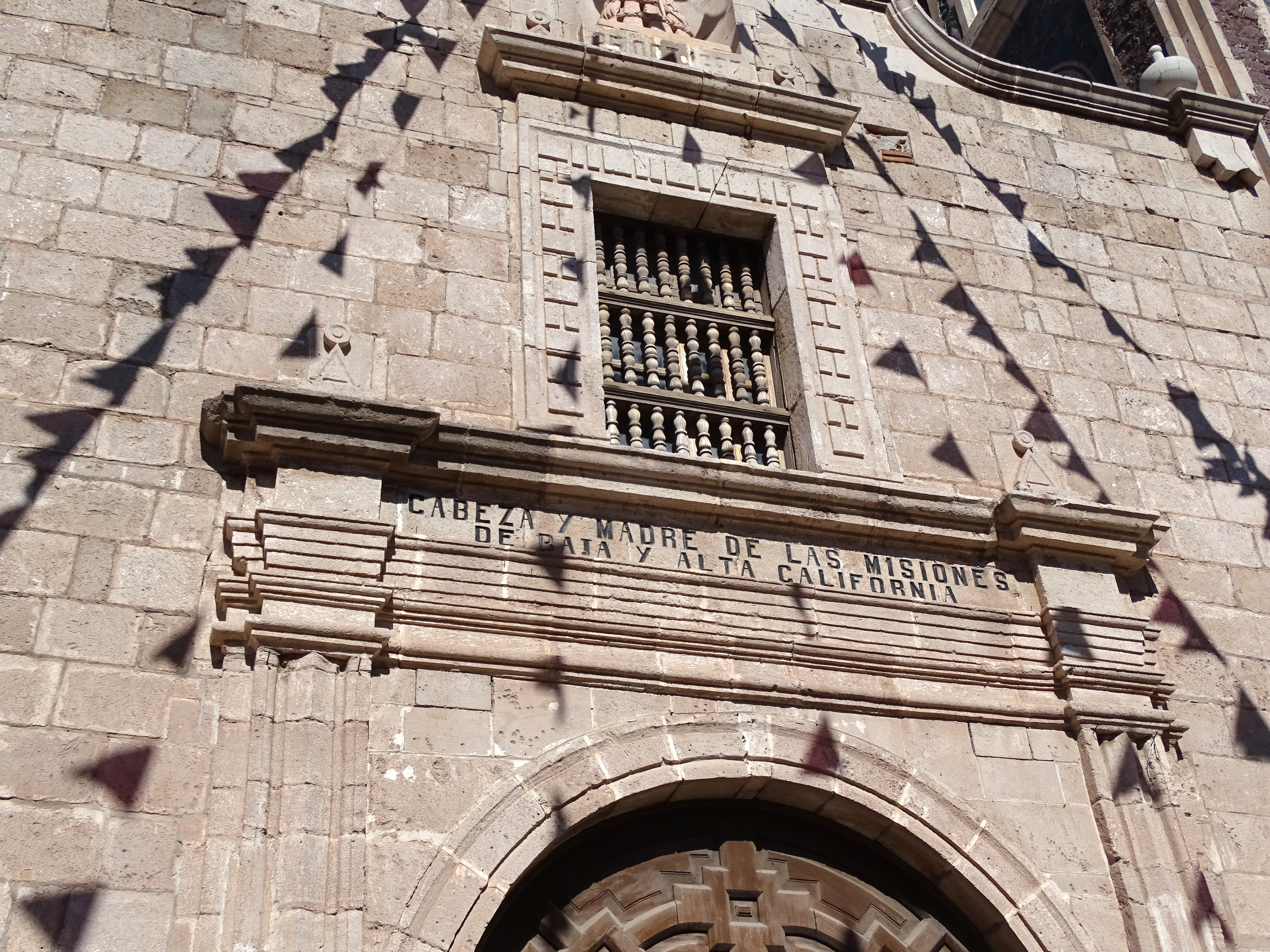
Detail of the façade

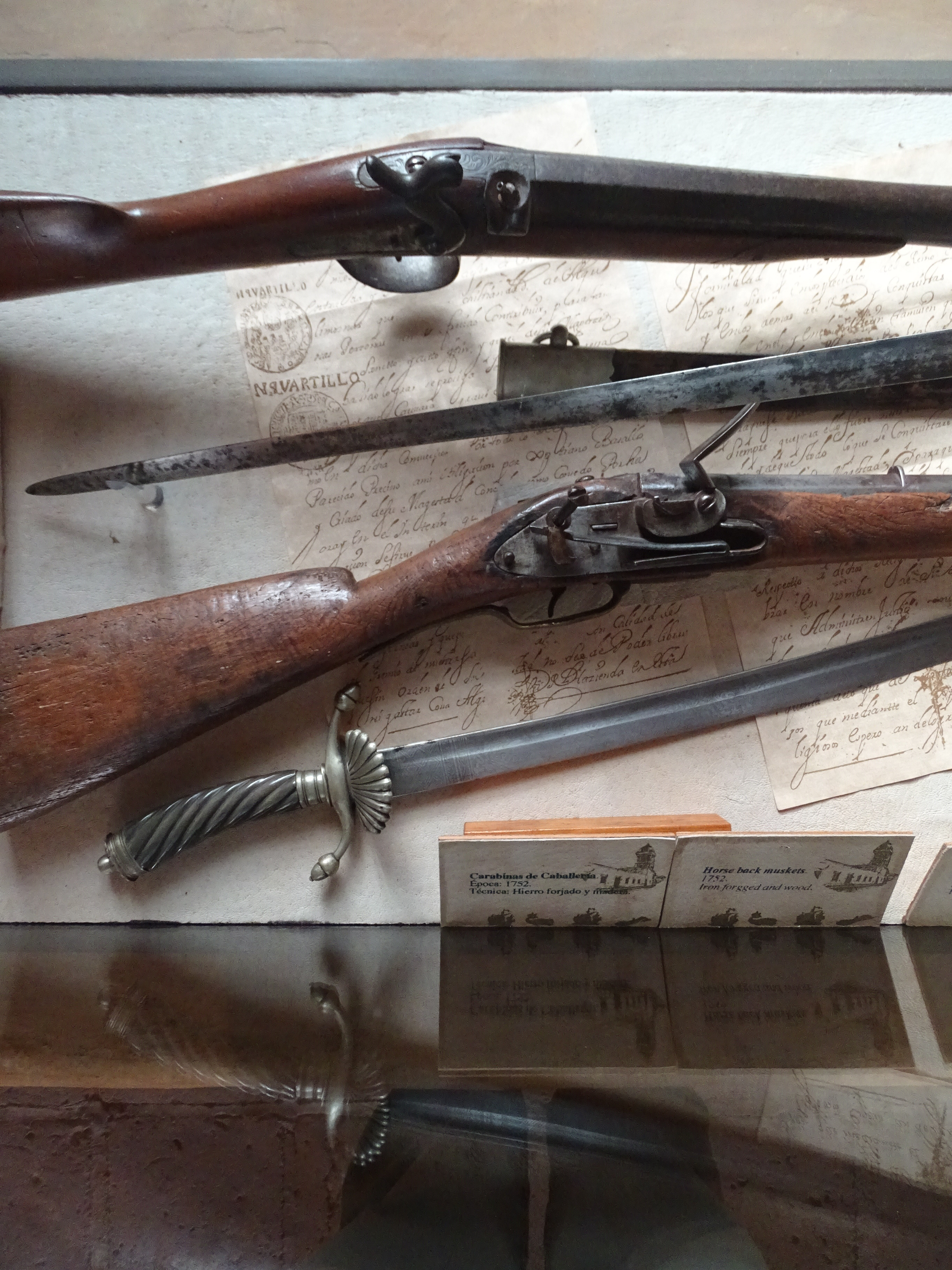
Presidio arms

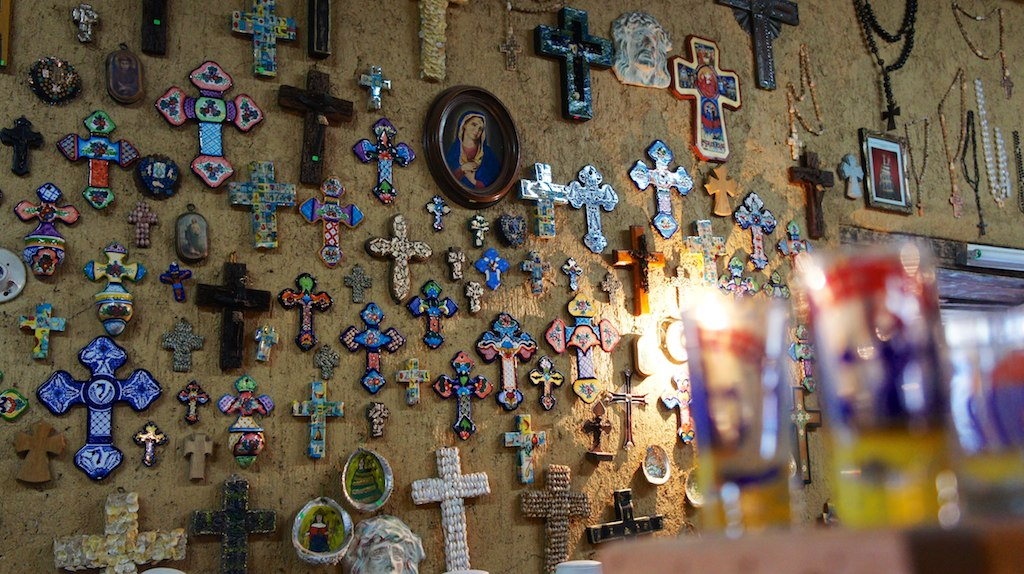
Colonial-regional rare religious artifacts

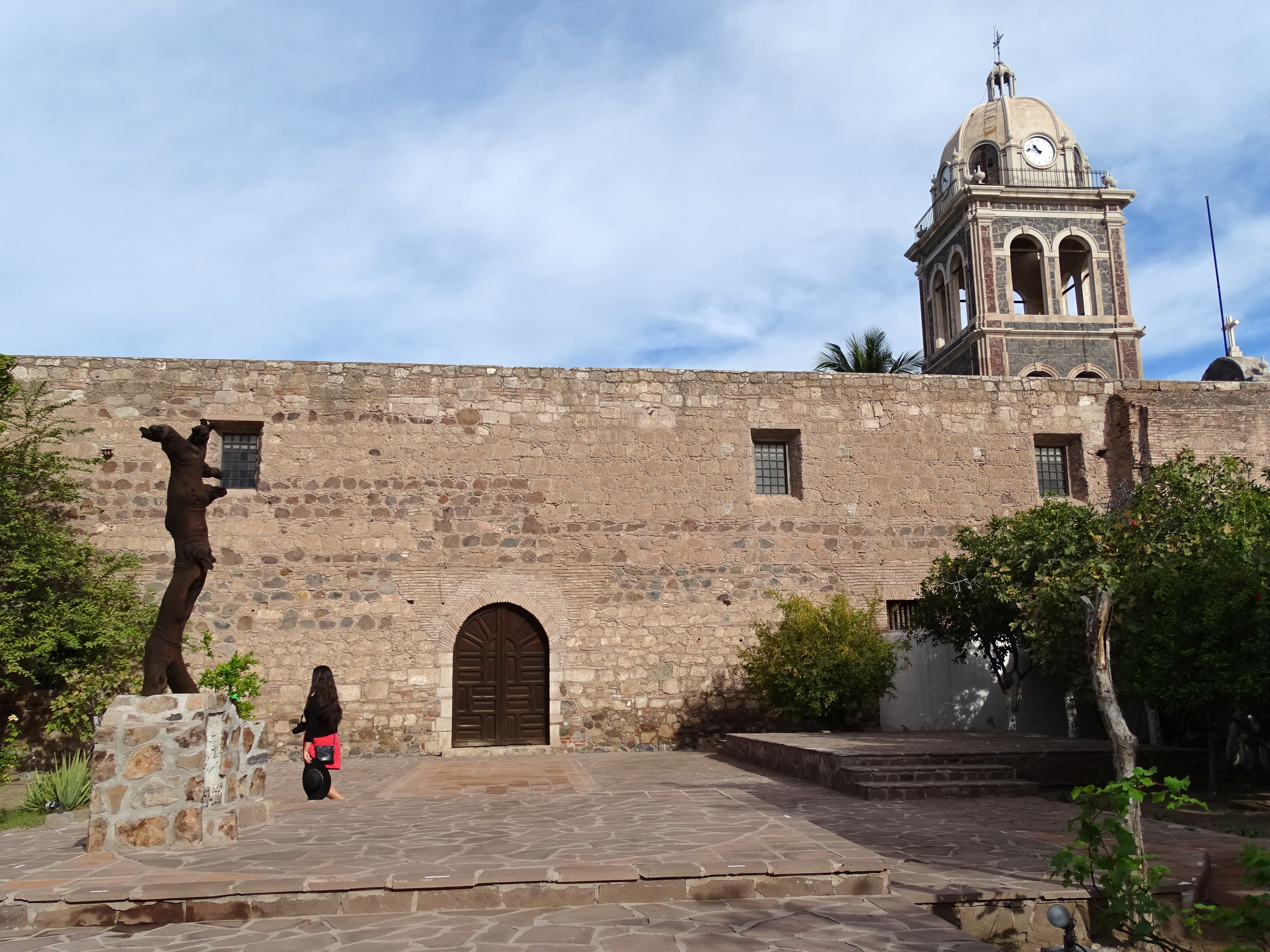
Side view from plaza de armas

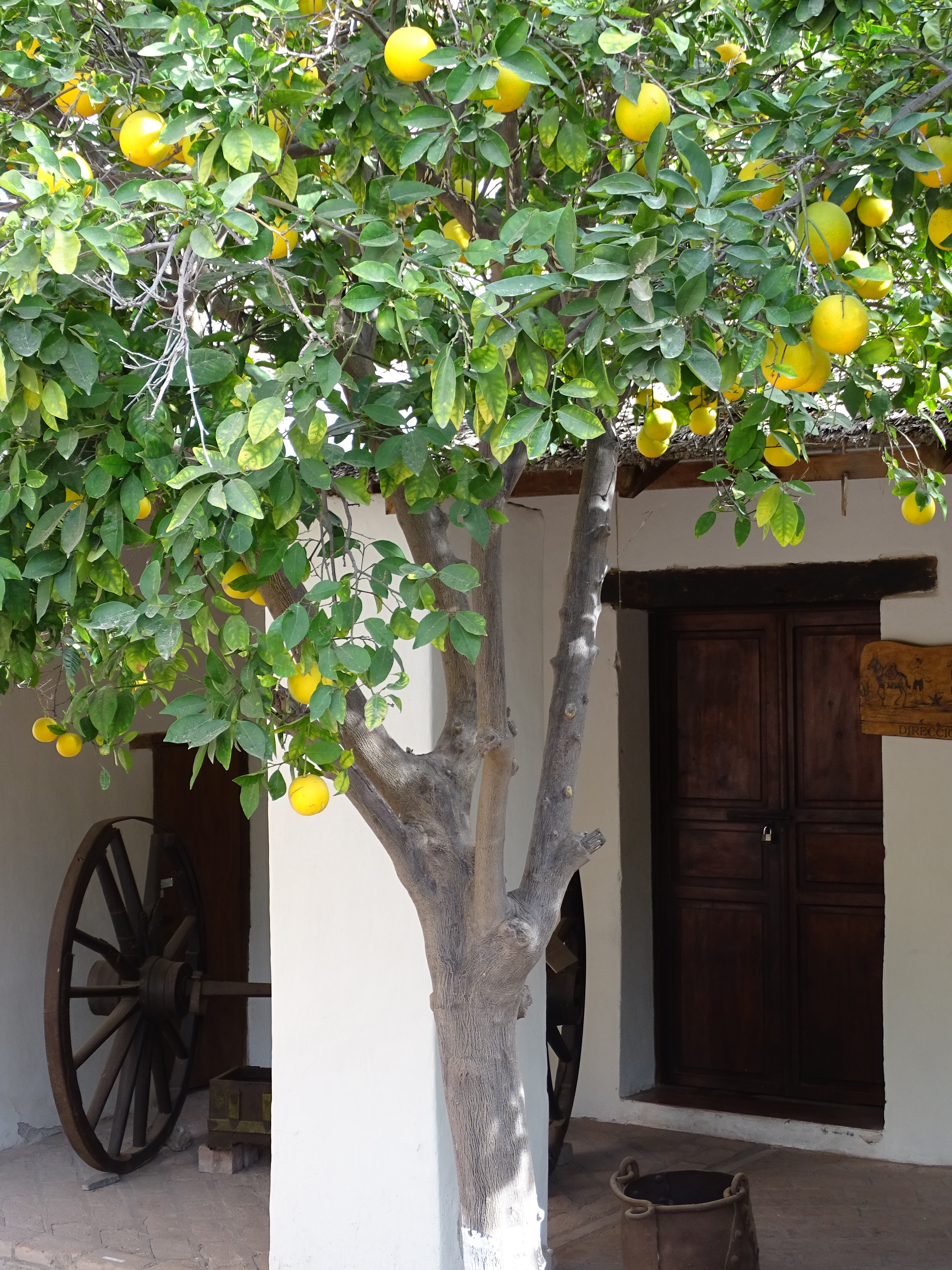
Museum structure attached to presidio from plaza de armas

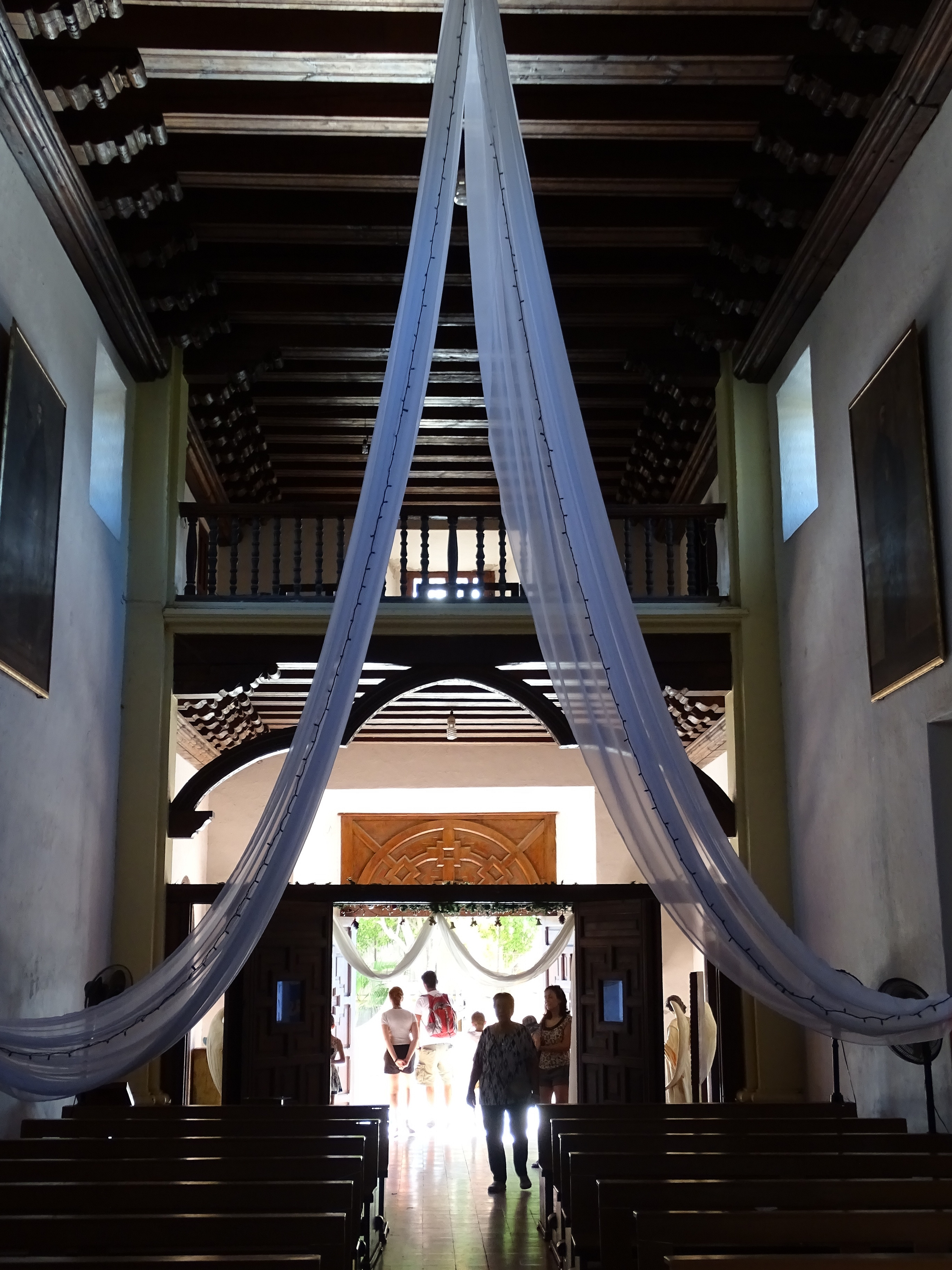
Main nave

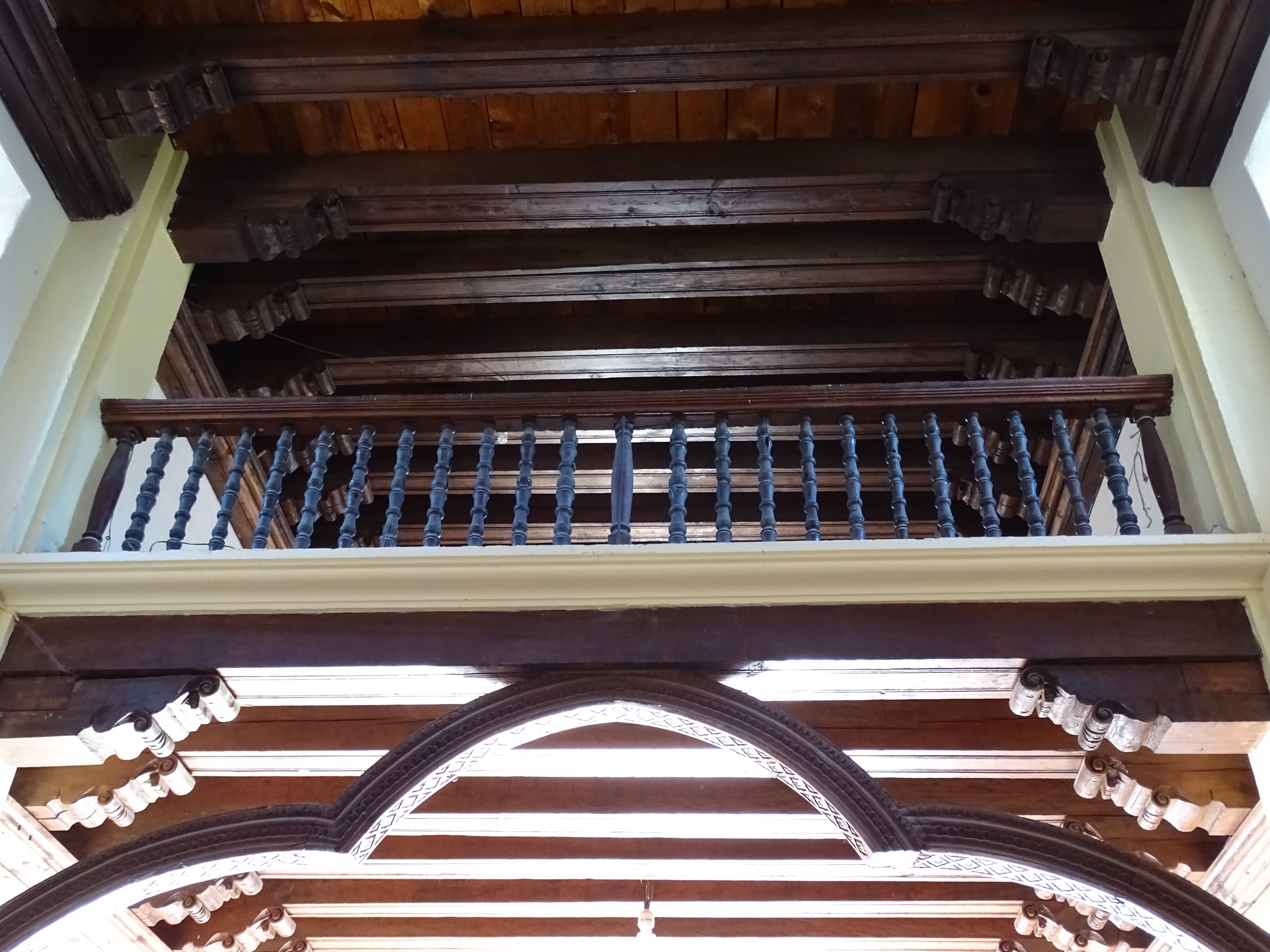
Interior

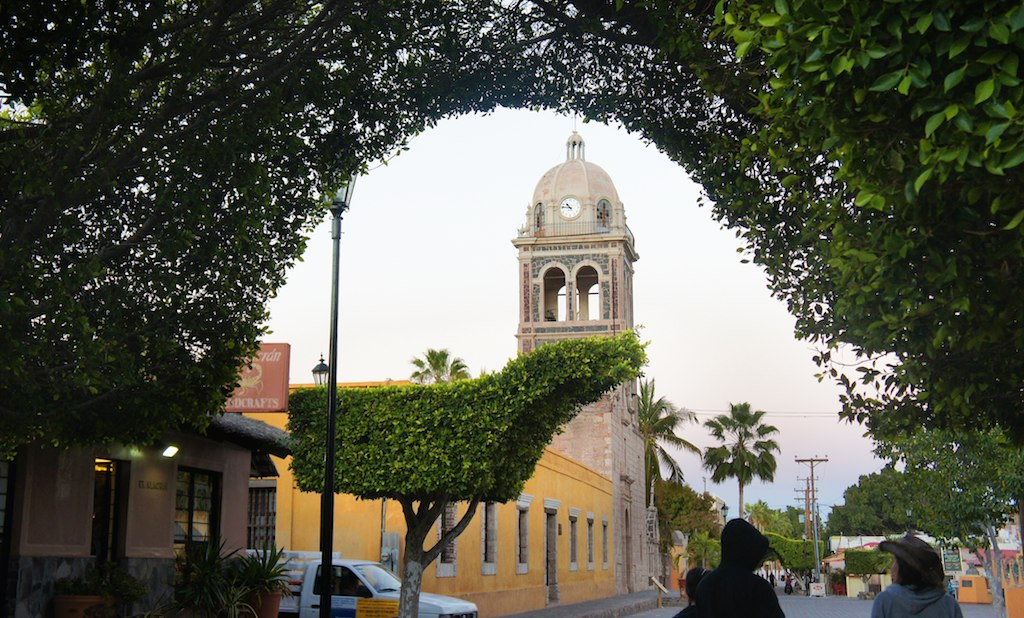
View of Misión de Nuestra Señora de Loreto Conchó and presidio, 2013

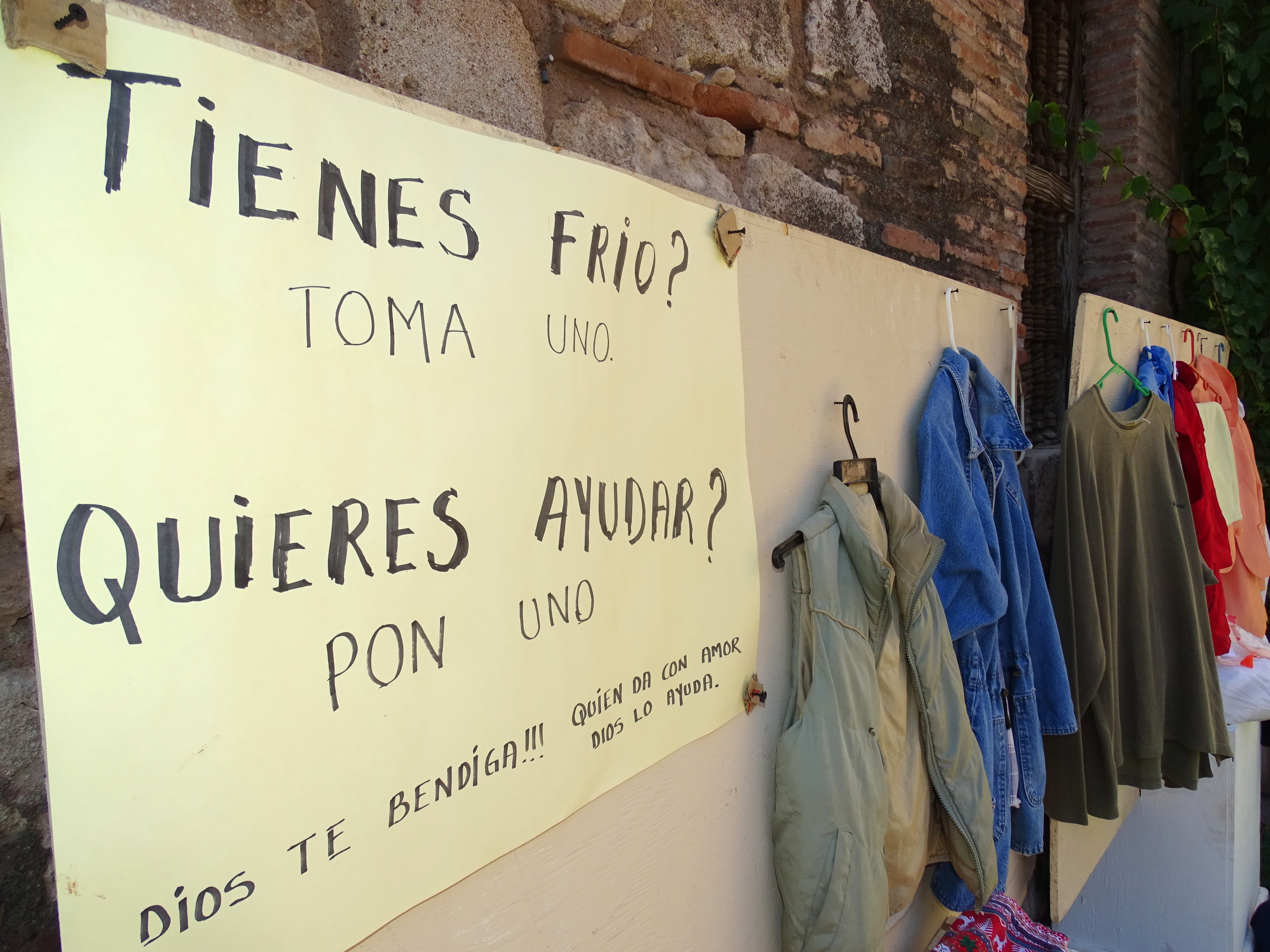
Free sweaters donated by neighbors, 2015

== See also ==
- Spanish missions in Baja California
- Spanish missions in California
- Veneration of Mary in the Catholic Church
- Spanish colonization of the Americas
- Eusebio Kino
- USNS Mission Loreto (AO-116), a Mission Buenaventura Class fleet oiler built during World War II
- List of Jesuit sites
