= Comondú complex =

Archaeological pattern

The Comondú Complex is an archaeological pattern dating from the late prehistoric period in northern Baja California Sur and southern Baja California. It is associated with the historic Cochimí people of the peninsula.

The complex was defined on the basis of investigations at rock shelters near the town of San Jose de Comondú by archaeologist William C. Massey, beginning in the late 1940s. It has been recognized at sites extending from the Sierra de la Giganta (west of Loreto) in the south to Bahía de los Ángeles in the north.

A key characteristic of the Comondú Complex is the presence of small Comondú Triangular and Comondú Serrated projectile points. These points reflect the introduction of the bow and arrow into the peninsula, perhaps around 500-1000 CE, largely supplanting the earlier atlatl and dart. Other traits include grinding basins and slicks, manos, tubular stone pipes, coiled basketry, and square-knot netting. The region's Great Mural rock art may also be associated with the Comondú Complex.
