= Miguel del Barco =

Jesuit missionary and writer (1706–1790)

Miguel del Barco (Casas de Millán, 1706– Bologna, 1790) was a Jesuit missionary in Baja California, Mexico and wrote major contributions to the peninsula's history and ethnography.

Del Barco was born at Casas de Millán in Cáceres, Extremadura, Spain and earned a degree at the University of Salamanca. He entered the Jesuit novitiate in Castile in 1728 and journeyed to the New World in 1735. In Baja California, he was sent briefly to the mission of San José del Cabo among the Pericú in 1737, before going to serve for more than three decades (1737–1768) among the Cochimí at San Javier. He oversaw the construction of the outstanding stone church at San Javier and served as visitador, the highest administrative office for the California missions, in 1750–1754 and 1761–1763. When the Jesuits were expelled from Spanish territory in 1767–1768, Barco went into exile in Bologna, in the Papal territory of Italy.

Barco's most enduring creation may have been his writings on the history and ethnography of Baja California. Several short reports and letters written at San Javier or Bologna have now been published. Prior to his exile, he was perhaps the author of an anonymous Adiciones to the manuscript Descripción de la California. In Bologna, apparently in the 1770s, he composed a lengthy manuscript of additions and corrections to the previously published history of the peninsula by Miguel Venegas. Barco's writings were one of the main sources for the subsequent history written by Francisco Javier Clavijero. Barco's own work remained in manuscript until 1973.
