= Wenceslaus Linck =

Wenceslaus Linck (German: Wenzel Linck) (29 March 1736 – 8 February 1797) was the last of the outstanding Jesuit missionary-explorers in Baja California.

Born in Neudek, Bohemia, he entered the Jesuit order at age 18 and studied at Brno and Prague. In New Spain, he continued his studies in Mexico City and Puebla between 1756 and 1761. In 1762 he was sent to Baja California, initially to Santa Gertrudis, at that time the northernmost Jesuit establishment. After preparing under Santa Gertrudis' missionary, Georg Retz, Linck moved north in the same year to found San Francisco de Borja Adac among the northern Cochimí.

In addition to administering the mission at San Borja, over the next five years Linck undertook a series of exploring expeditions to scout future mission sites and resolve geographical puzzles. His travels included journeys to the peninsula's west coast, to Isla Angel de la Guarda, and to the north in an ambitious but failed attempt to reach the lower Colorado River and settle once and for all the geographical question of whether Baja California was an island.

When the Jesuits were expelled from Baja California in 1768, Linck returned to Bohemia, where he died in 1797.

Linck's geographical and ethnographic contributions have been preserved in a series of letters and reports, as well as accounts by his contemporaries, and his key role in the exploration of the northern portion of the Baja California peninsula has been recognized (Aschmann 1959; Linck 1966, 1967; Barco 1973; Bendímez and Laylander 1985).

== See also ==
- Wenzeslaus Linck
