= Commission of the Californias =

Multilateral cooperation institution of the Californias

- Spanish: Comisión de las Californias
- The Californias, a region on the Pacific coast of North America made up of the states of California (U.S), Baja California (Mexico), and Baja California Sur (Mexico).
- Formation: June 25, 1964 (Establishment); December 4, 2019 (Reestablishment)
- Type: Multilateral international organization
- Members: California; Baja California; Baja California Sur
- Official languages: English, Spanish

The Commission of the Californias (Spanish: Comisión de las Californias), abbreviated as ComCal, is a multilateral forum for regional cooperation between the Californias, a region of North America encompassing the U.S. state of California and the Mexican states of Baja California and Baja California Sur.

== History ==
The Commission of the Californias was established on June 25, 1964, by Governor Pat Brown of California and Governor Eligio Esquivel Méndez of Baja California, as a forum to discuss common issues and develop common solutions.

In 1967, the commission produced the book The Call to California, commemorating the bicentennial of the Portolá expedition of 1769–1770. It hired photographer Harry W. Crosby to recreate Portolá's voyage from Baja California to Alta California, for illustrations in the book.

In 1968, Baja California Sur joined the commission, under Governor Hugo Cervantes del Río.

In 2004, the commission was dissolved by Governor Arnold Schwarzenegger of California.

In 2017, then lieutenant governor Gavin Newsom called for the reestablishment of the Commission of the Californias, citing the importance of cultural and economic ties between the three Californian states. A motion to reinstate the commission was subsequently proposed by Deputy Patricia Ramírez Gutiérrez to the Congress of Baja California Sur.

The Commission of the Californias was reestablished on December 4, 2019, by Governor Gavin Newsom of California, Governor Jaime Bonilla Valdez of Baja California, and Governor Carlos Mendoza Davis of Baja California Sur.

In 2020, the commission's tri-lateral discussions were focused on establishing transboundary guidelines, with attention to natural disaster preparedness, increasing cooperation on tackling transboundary pollution affecting the Tijuana River Valley, and conducting feasibility studies for a joint tri-Californian trade show and pavilion to boost economic cooperation and competitiveness.

In 2022, the Commission of the Californias hosted a tri-state hybrid meeting in San Diego with more than 100 officials attending from all three Californian states, with the intention of reinvigorating the commission following the COVID-19 pandemic and recent elections. Apart from general discussions, the focus of the 2022 meeting was on climate change, covering topics such as the transition towards zero-emissions vehicles and the regional impacts this would bring within the Californias.

== Functions ==
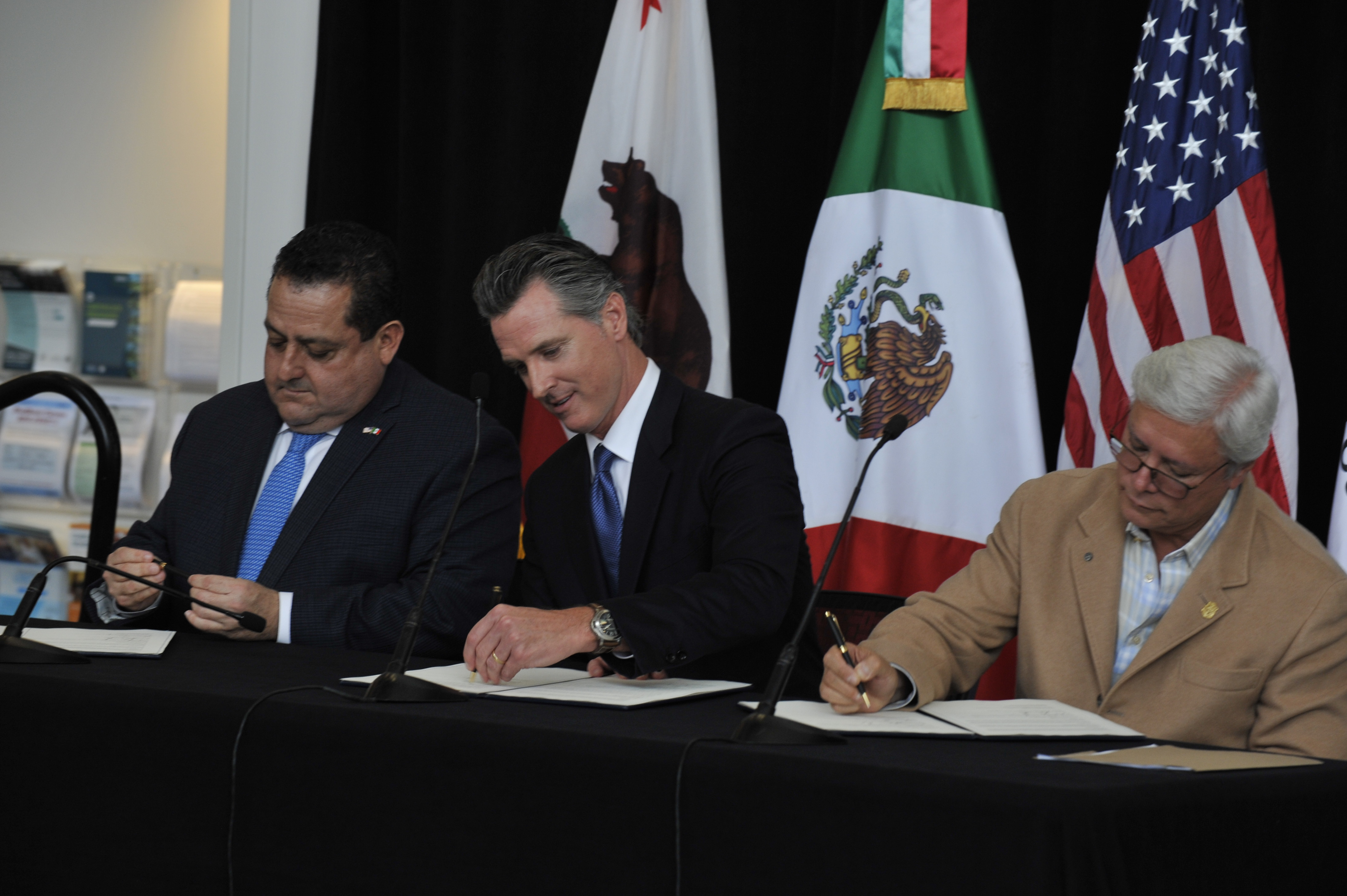
Signing ceremony reestablishing the Commission of the Californias in 2019. Pictured are Governor Jaime Bonilla Valdez of Baja California (right), Governor Gavin Newsom of California (center), and Governor Carlos Mendoza Davis of Baja California Sur (left).

The Commission of the Californias serves as a platform for cooperation between the three Californian states, particularly in regards to common challenges and solutions to address them. Noted areas of focus include:

- Environment and energy
- Transportation and infrastructure
- Emergency preparedness and response
- Economic development and tourism
- Agriculture
- Public health

The commission's activities are planned and carried out by the offices of the three governors. The commission is intended to meet in collective discussions at least once a year.

Representatives on the commission include the governor of each states, as well as delegations of public officials and subject matter experts appointed by governors and state legislatures.

== See also ==
- The Californias
  - California
  - Baja California
  - Baja California Sur
- Mexico-United States relations
