= Casas de Millán =

Coordinates: 39°49′N 6°19′W

Casas de Millán, Spain
- municipality
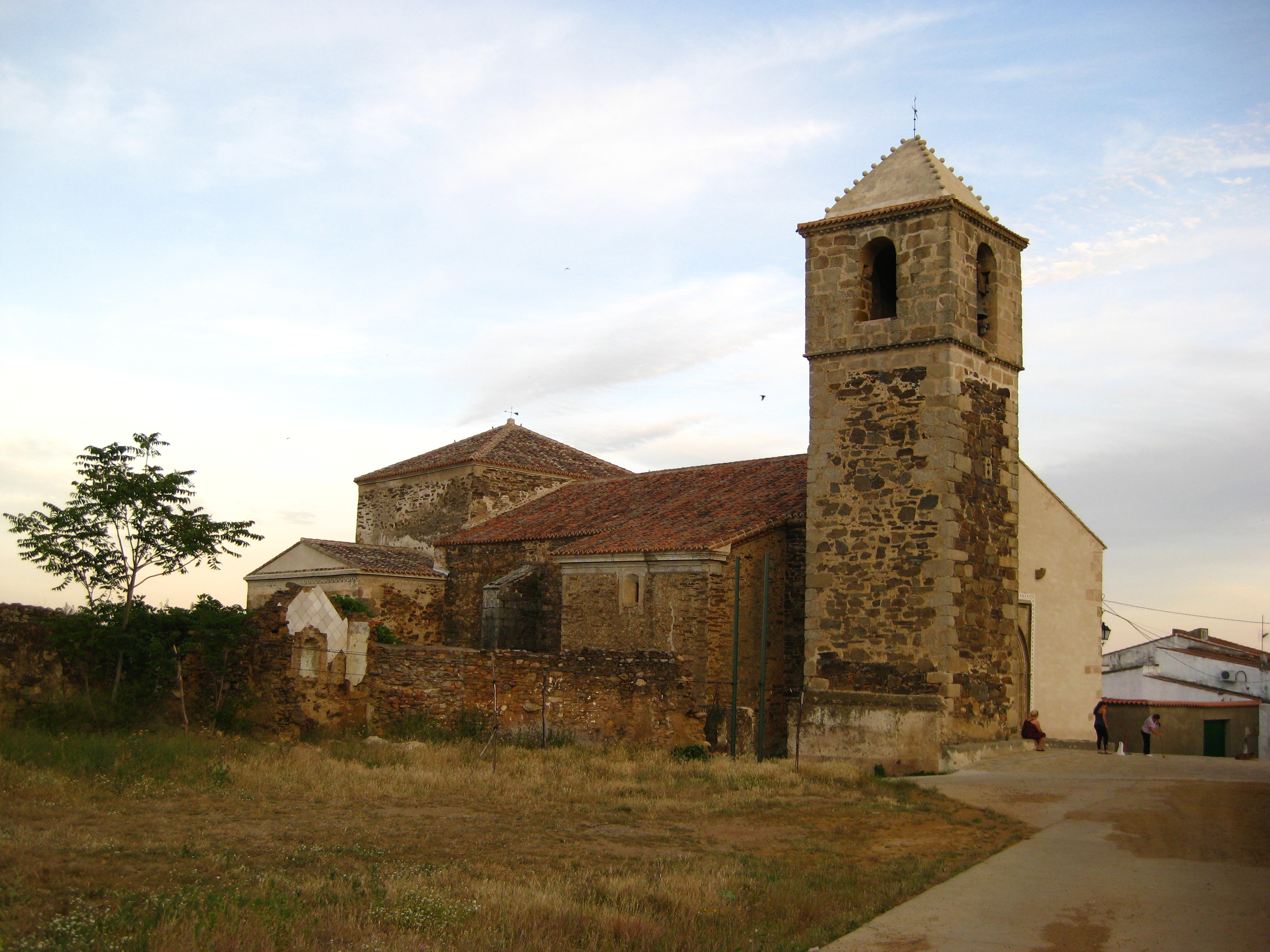

- Flag Coat of arms
- Interactive map of Casas de Millán, Spain
- Country: Spain
- Autonomous community: Extremadura
- Province: Cáceres
- Municipality: Casas de Millán

Area
  - Total: 152 km^{2} (59 sq mi)

Population (2025-01-01)
  - Total: 536
  - Density: 3.53/km^{2} (9.13/sq mi)
- Time zone: UTC+1 (CET)
  - Summer (DST): UTC+2 (CEST)

Casas de Millán (Spanish pronunciation: [ˈkasas ðe miˈʎan]) is a municipality located in the province of Cáceres, Extremadura, Spain. According to the 2006 census (INE), the municipality has a population of 720 inhabitants.

== See also ==
- List of municipalities in Cáceres
