= Harry W. Crosby =

American historian and photographer (1926–2024)

Harry Crosby
- Born: 10 June 1926
- Died: 12 September 2024 (aged 98)
- Education: Occidental College
- Children: Robbin

Harry W. Crosby (June 10, 1926 – September 12, 2024) was an American historian and photographer.

== Life and career ==
Crosby was born on June 10, 1926. His parents moved to La Jolla in 1935. He graduated from La Jolla High School in 1944, and studied math and science at Occidental College in Los Angeles, completing a double major in pre-med and psychology. After twelve years as a teacher of secondary-level science, mostly chemistry, he took up photography, and in 1967, was hired as a photographer to illustrate the book The Call to California for the Commission of the Californias, commemorating California's bicentennial. Following the route of the Portolá expedition of 1769 to make photos to illustrate a text derived from diaries of the trekkers, Crosby rode 600 miles on muleback on remote trails. Since then, he has continued to do primary research and to write extensively on the history and cave paintings of Baja California and the early history of Alta California.

Crosby's field research, writing, photography, and advocacy of the Great Mural cave paintings of Baja helped the region to be named a UNESCO World Heritage Site in 1993. While early archeological studies pegged the age of the rock art in Baja at around 1,000 years old, Crosby long contended that the murals were far older. His views were vindicated in 2022 with the publication of a scientific paper detailing the results of an extensive carbon-dating study conducted by a team of geoscientists and archeologists from Australia, Mexico, and Argentina. The study concluded that the Great Murals in central Baja dated as far back as 11,000 years—to the end of the last Ice Age and the estimated arrival of the first humans on the Baja peninsula. The study showed that the cave paintings were created and maintained for thousands of years, ending 550 years ago with the arrival of Spanish conquistadors and Jesuit missionaries in Baja California.

His books include: The Cave Paintings of Baja California: Discovering the Great Murals of an Unknown People (Copley Books, 1975, reissued by Sunbelt Publications, San Diego, 1997); Gateway to Alta California: The Expedition to San Diego, 1769 (Sunbelt, 2004), which was a finalist for the 2003 Southern California Booksellers Association award; and Antigua California: Mission and Colony on the Peninsula Frontier, 1697-1768 (University of New Mexico Press, 1996), which won the 1995 Caroline Bancroft History Prize from the Denver Public Library. Some of Crosby's early photography is collected in the book Tijuana 1964: A Photographic and Historic View (SDSU Press, 2000); and his only novel is Portrait of Paloma (Sunbelt, 2001).

Crosby died on September 12, 2024, at the age of 98. His son was the late Robbin Crosby, best known for his tenure as guitarist of the rock band Ratt.

== Bibliography ==
- Harry W. Crosby (April 1984). The Cave Paintings of Baja California. Copley Books. ISBN 978-0-913938-27-0.
- Harry W. Crosby (1989). Doomed to Fail: Gaspar de Portolá's First California Appointees. SCERP and IRSC publications. ISBN 978-0-925613-00-4.
- Harry W. Crosby (1994). Antigua California: Mission and Colony on the Peninsular Frontier, 1697-1768. UNM Press. ISBN 978-0-8263-1495-6.
- Harry W. Crosby (8 October 2015). Californio Portraits: Baja California's Vanishing Culture. University of Oklahoma Press. ISBN 978-0-8061-5258-5.
