= Misión San Fernando Rey de España de Velicatá =

18th-century Spanish mission in Baja California, Mexico

- Location in Baja California Location in Mexico
- Location: San Quintín Municipality, Baja California, Mexico
- Coordinates: 29°58′16″N 115°14′12″W
- Patron: Ferdinand III of Castile
- Founded: 14 May 1769
- Founded by: Junípero Serra
- Founding Order: Franciscans
- Native tribe: Cochimí

Another mission bearing the name San Fernando Rey de España is located in the Mission Hills neighborhood of Los Angeles, California.

Mission San Fernando Velicatá (Spanish: Misión San Fernando Rey de España de Velicatá) was a Spanish mission located about 56 km (35 mi) southeast of El Rosario in Baja California, Mexico. The mission was founded in 1769 by Franciscan missionary Junípero Serra and was the only mission founded by Franciscan missionaries in what is now Baja California.

== History ==
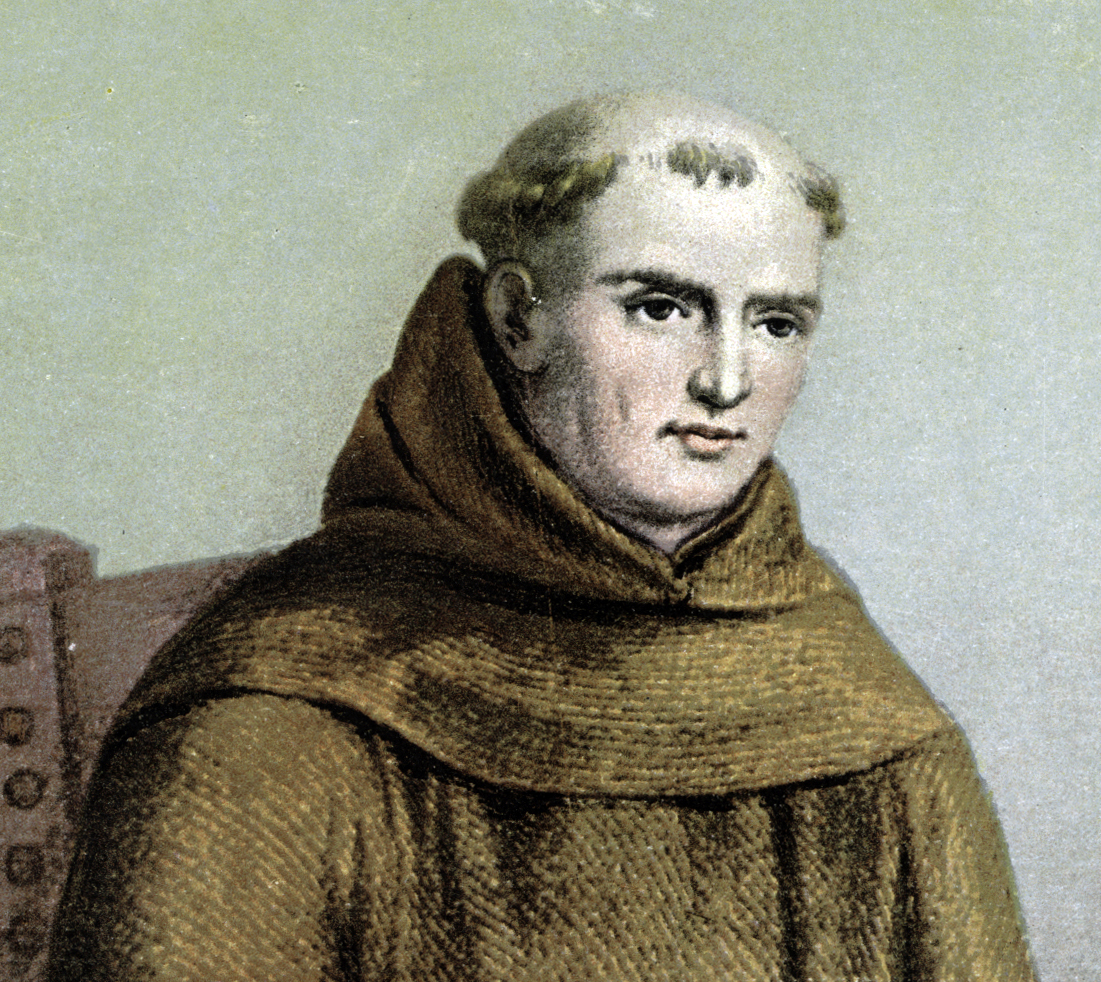
Junípero Serra, the mission's founder

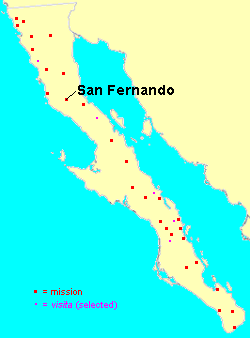
Location of Mission San Fernando among the Spanish missions in Baja California

The site for the future mission was identified by the Jesuit missionary-explorer Wenceslaus Linck in 1766. After the Jesuits were replaced by the Franciscans in 1768, the latter were charged with extending Spanish control far to the north, into Alta California. Mission San Fernando, at the Cochimí settlement of Velicatá on the route north, was established by Junípero Serra during the early stages of the Portolá expedition, on May 14, 1769, the day of Pentecost. This would be Father Junipero Serra's first mission before moving north to Alta California.

In the 1770s, under the Franciscans and then after 1773 under their Dominican successors, the mission quickly reached its peak and went into decline as epidemics decimated the native population. The missionaries were no longer permanently resident at the site after about 1818.

== Present day ==
A few ruined walls and stone foundations survive at the site as well as petroglyphs and some remains of pictograms. An aqueduct and a small dam can be seen just to the west of the mission ruins.

== See also ==
- Spanish missions in Baja California

== Bibliography ==
- Aviles, Brian A.; Hoover, Robert L. (Summer 1997). "Two Californias, Three Religious Orders and Fifty Missions: A Comparison of the Missionary Systems of Baja and Alta California" (PDF). Pacific Coast Archaeological Society Quarterly. 33 (3).
- Sauer, Carl O.; Meigs, Peveril (September 30, 1927). "Site and Culture at San Fernando Velicatá". University of California Publications in Geography. 2 (9). Berkeley: University of California Press (published 1929): 271–302 – via Internet Archive.
- Vernon, Edward W. (2002). Las Misiones Antiguas: the Spanish Missions of Baja California, 1683-1855. Santa Barbara, California: Viejo Press. OCLC 432959321.
- Johnson, Earl (1978). "Rock Art of Velicatá". In Meighan, Clement W.; Pontoni, V. L. (eds.). Seven Rock Art Sites in Baja California. Socorro, New Mexico: Ballena Press – via Internet Archive.
- Aschmann, Homer (1967). The Central Desert of Baja California: Demography and Ecology. Riverside, California: Manessier Publishing Company – via Internet Archive.
- Serra, Junípero (1955). Tibesar, Antonine (ed.). Writings of Junípero Serra. Vol. I. Baltimore, Maryland: Academy of American Franciscan History – via HathiTrust.
