= Misión San Francisco Borja =

18th-century Spanish mission in Baja California, Mexico

Misión San Francisco Borja de Adac
- Location in Baja California Location in Mexico
- Location: San Quintín Municipality; Baja California, Mexico
- Coordinates: 28°44′40″N 113°45′15″W
- Patron: Francis Borgia, 4th Duke of Gandía
- Founded: 1762
- Founded by: Wenceslaus Linck
- Founding Order: Jesuits
- Native tribe(s) Spanish name(s): Cochimí
- Current use: Museum

Misión San Francisco Borja de Adac was a Spanish mission established in 1762 by the Jesuit Wenceslaus Linck at the Cochimí settlement of Adac, west of Bahía de los Ángeles. The mission was named after Francis Borgia, 4th Duke of Gandía.

== History ==
Before becoming a mission, the future site of San Borja served as a visita or subordinate mission station for Misión Santa Gertrudis. The construction of buildings was begun in 1759. A stone church was completed during the Dominican period, in 1801.

The mission was abandoned in 1818, as the native population in this part of the peninsula disappeared. Structures and ruins survive.

== Preservation ==
As of 2016 an 8th generation family is still caring for the structures on their property. They provide tours and share knowledge.

== See also ==
- Missions in Baja California
- List of Jesuit sites
