= Misión Santa Gertrudis =

18th-century Spanish mission in Baja California, Mexico

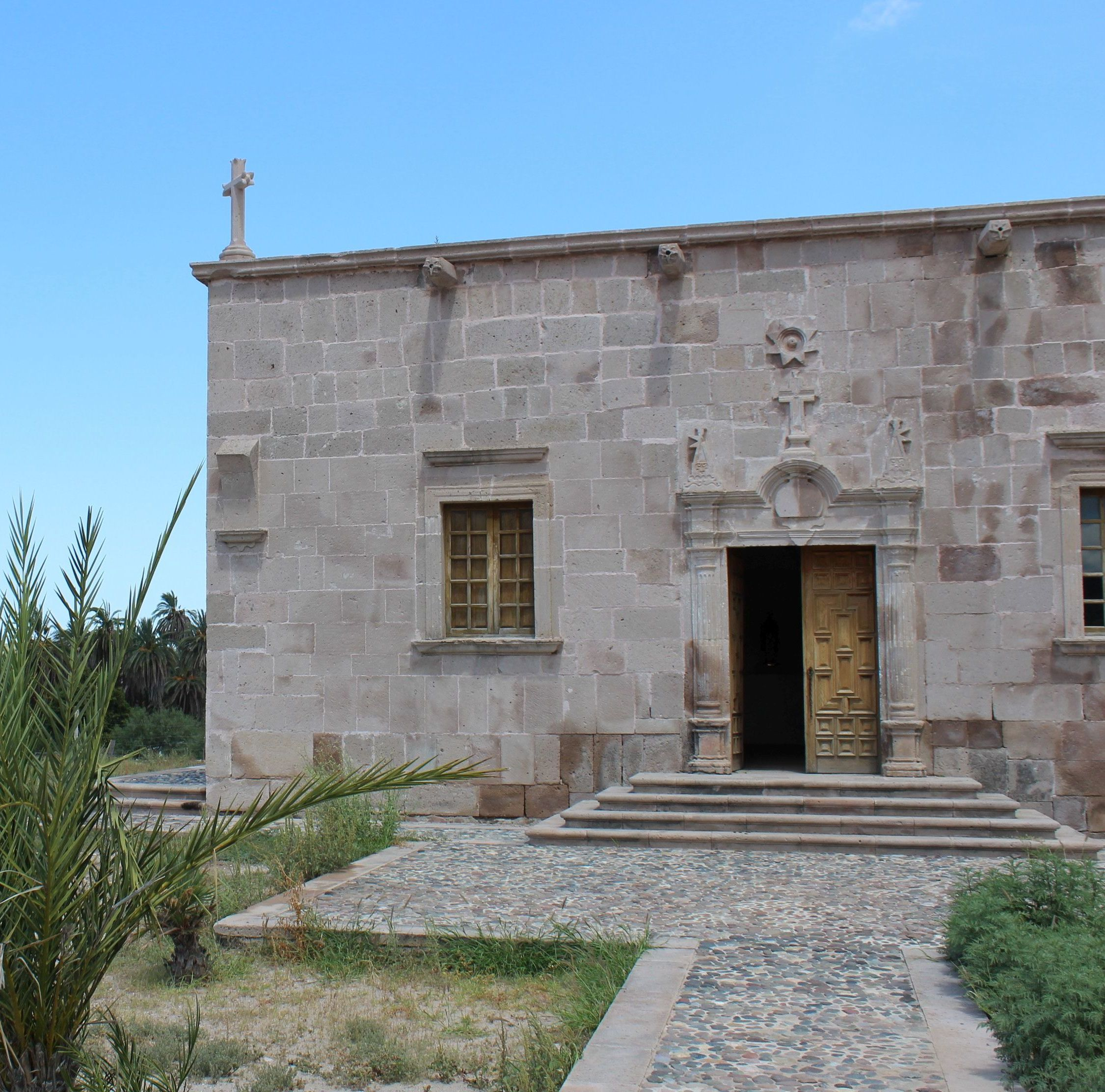

- Location in Baja California Location in Mexico
- Location: Loreto Municipality, Baja California Sur, Mexico
- Coordinates: 28°3′4″N 113°5′7″W
- Patron: Gertrude the Great
- Founded: 1752
- Founding Order: Jesuits
- Native tribe(s) Spanish name(s): Cochimí

Mission Santa Gertrudis (Spanish: Misión Santa Gertrudis), originally to be called Dolores del Norte, was a Spanish mission established by the Jesuit missionary Georg Retz in 1752 in what is today the Mexican state of Baja California. It is located about 80 km (50 mi) north of San Ignacio, Baja California Sur.

== History ==
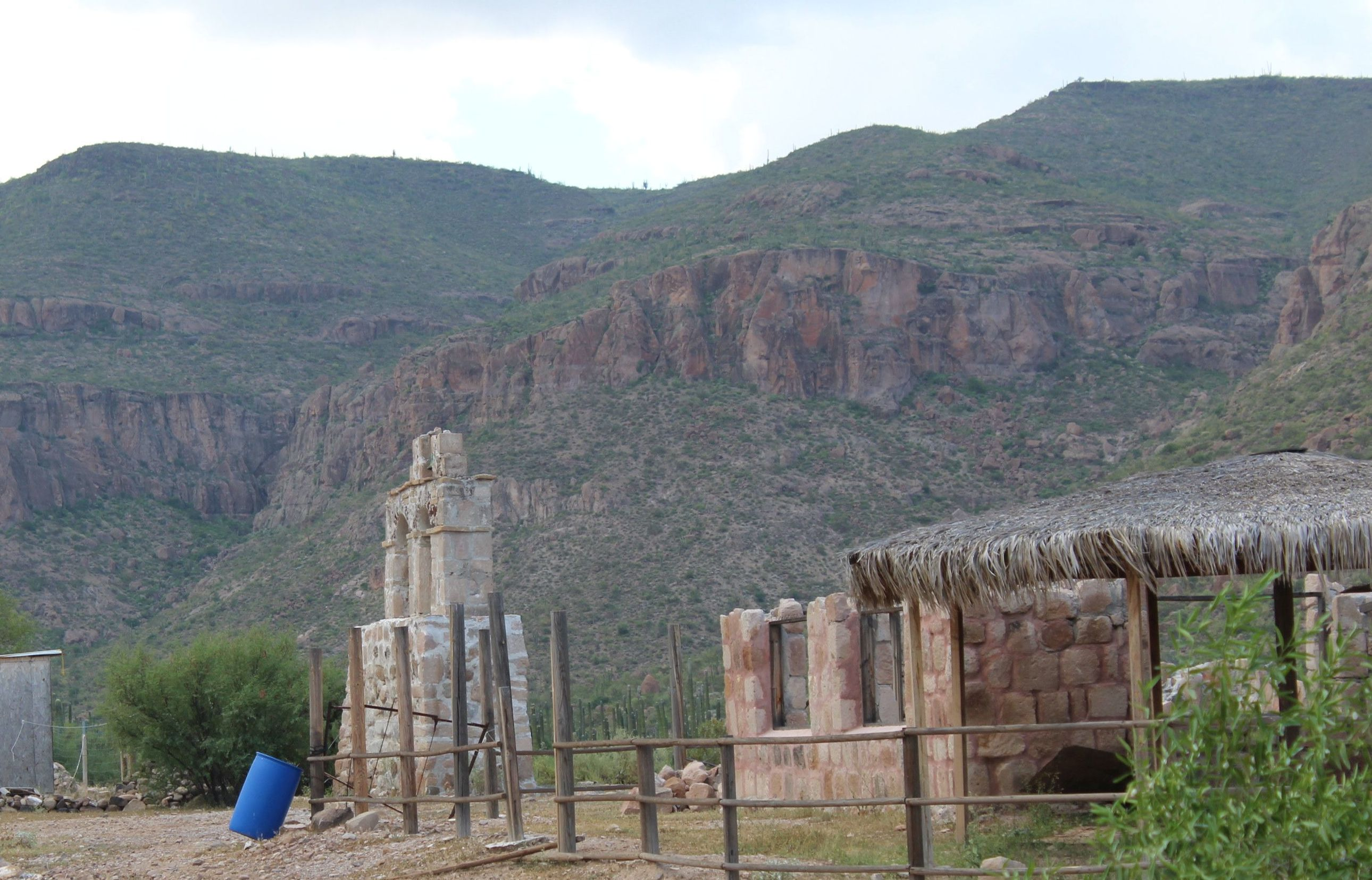
View of the mission grounds.

The future mission site was discovered by the missionary-explorer Fernando Consag, and work at the site was begun a year before the formal founding of the mission. Consag's sponsors for establishing this mission were the Marquis de Villapuente and his wife Dona Gertrudis de la Peña after whom the mission was named.

Assisted by Andrés Comanji, Consag discovered a spring as well as ancient rock paintings a mere three kilometers from the site of the mission. He enlisted the aid of the Cochimi to transport water from the spring of Santa Gertrudis and used it to establish vineyards for sacramental wine production. These vines became the basis for the contemporary vineyards of Baja California.

== Architecture ==
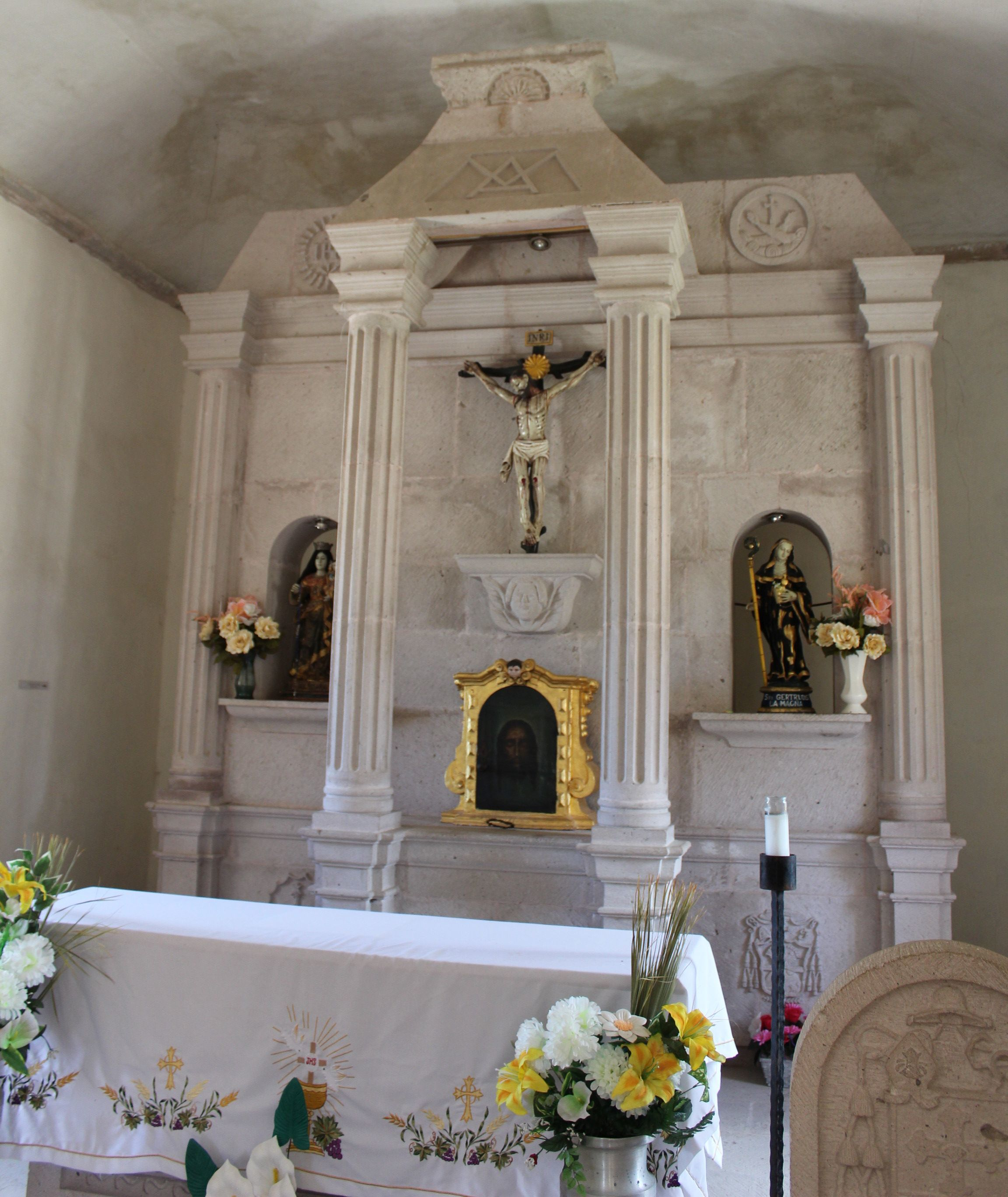
The altarpiece.

The architecture of the mission is reminiscent of the medieval styles of the country of origin of Retz, with carved stone. The beautiful church doors are flanked by finely decorated obelisk style columns.

The mission was finally abandoned in 1822. The church was extensively renovated in 1997, substantially altering its historical character.

== Ecology ==
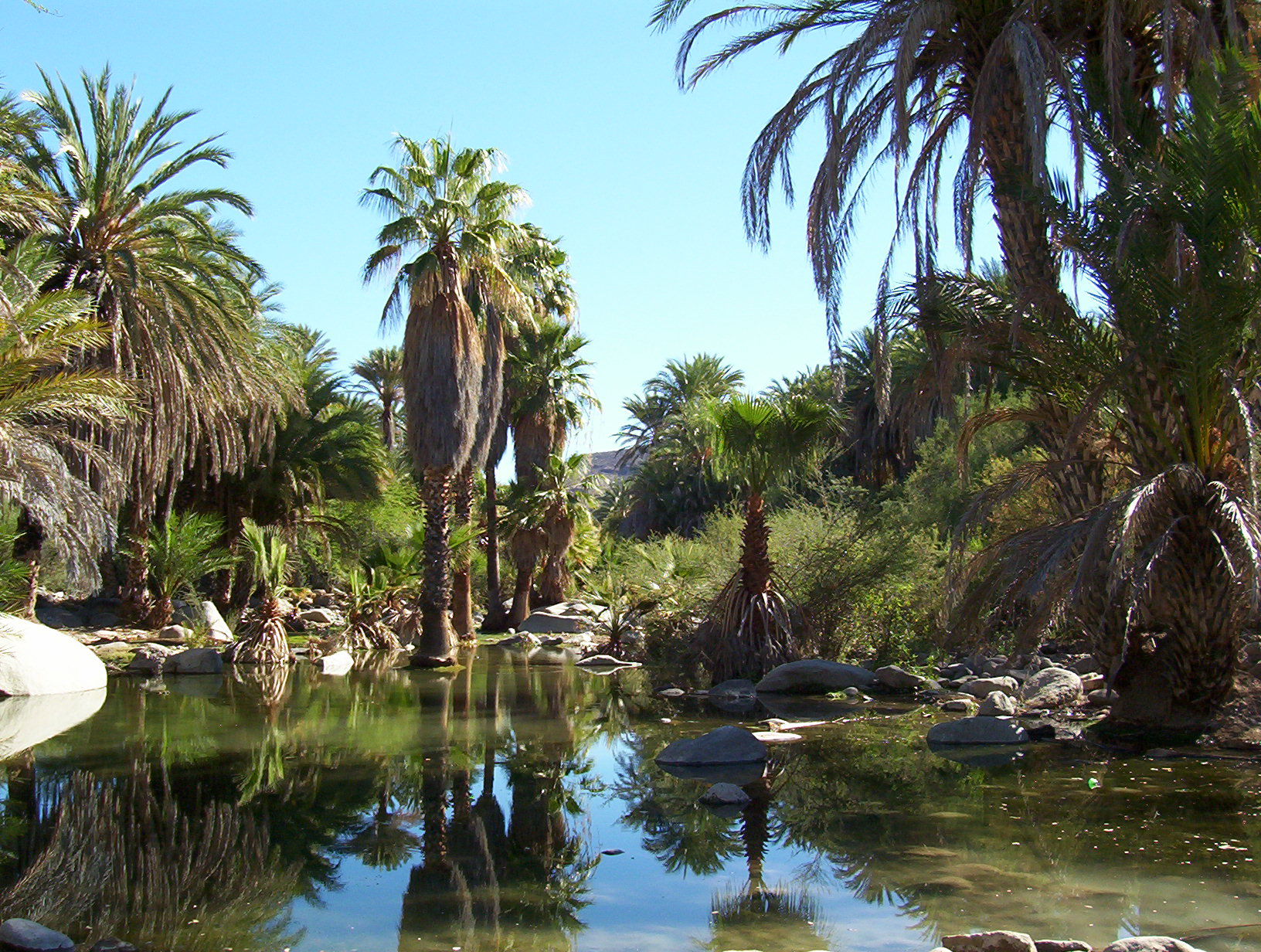
Oasis de Santa Gertrudis

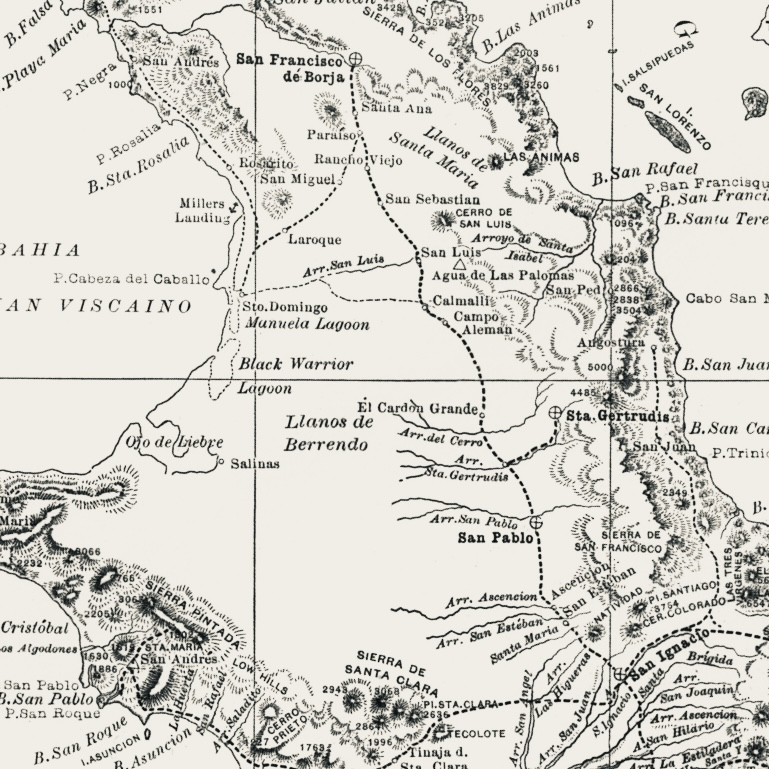
Detail of a map of central Baja California peninsula showing Santa Gertrudis and nearby arroyo watercourses

The area surrounding the old mission, called Oasis de Santa Gertrudis, is one of a number of oasis systems associated with Spanish missions in Baja California. The Santa Gertrudis site is classified as interior mountain mid-peninsula oasis, and is considered to be on the smaller side relative to the 183 other identified oases on the Baja California peninsula. Baja has no perennial rivers so what mesic habitats exist are "small riparian environments" sustained wholly by springs, seeps, human-mediated oases, wetlands, and seasonal ponds (pozas or tinajas). Water is inconsistently available in Baja generally (due to unpredictable rain events) and at Santa Gertrudis specifically. Biologists from San Diego State University who visited the site in 1990 described it as "thickly vegetated, wide, funnel-shaped, rocky arroyo which narrows at its eastern end at the western foot of the Sierra Santa Agueda".

The mission took advantage of an existing spring to sustain the settlement, and created reservoirs and an irrigation ditch (sometimes called an acequia or zanja) "in many places as much as six feet deep...cut in the sandstone to conduct water from a spring several hundred yards above the mission" to water fields and orchards. Writing in the mid-20th century, Homer Aschmann said the spring had failed but parts of ditch remained visible. However, researchers in 2013 found that the Santa Gertrudis spring had a "steep, short descent" in relation to the rest of the watershed in the immediate area. The spring, in combination with the water-management structure and the imported perennial food species introduced during the Jesuit–Dominican–Franciscan mission era from 1751 to 1822, continue to support an agroforestry system populated by a diverse array of perennial food plants. The 1990 SDSU assessment found the historic water system "to be in miserable shape" with the oasis pools heavily damaged by livestock.

The agricultural prospects of the isolated location with low annual rainfall were always somewhat poor, and the site was never self-sufficient, but the combination of the spring and the fact that "numerous Indians could only be converted if they were not removed from their home territory" led the Spanish missionaries to lay out grain fields, fruit orchards and vineyards at the location. At the height of population and prosperity during the mission era, Santa Gertrudis may have supported about 100 associated rancherías. However, the site continually imported staple foods, including "flour, corn, beans, rice, chick-pea, lentil, sugar," and hunting (deer) and foraging (hearts of agave) remained a major source of calories for residents of the settlement. By the 1830s and 1840s, the only remaining agricultural production was "from the few surviving fruit trees." Some local farmers currently grow vegetables for sale.

The settlement oases of the Baja California are considered biodiverse habitats in part because of "more than three centuries of human activities". Like many exemplars of the North American Palm Oasis habitat type, the overstory is dominated by indigenous Washingtonia filifera, Washingtonia filifera var. robusta and introduced date palms. Other plants present in the system include acacia, banana, fig, guava, mango, mulberry, pomegranate, prickly pear, olive, tamarind, tepeguaje, and white sapote. Of 21 species of cultivated plant known to have been introduced to the Californias by Spanish missionaries, 16 are still present at Oasis de Santa Gertrudis. Santa Gertrudis oasis is in close proximity to the nearby Valle de los Cirios wildlife protection area. According to ethnobotanists Rafael de Grenade and Gary Paul Nabhan, the Baja mission oasis ecosystems generally support local biodiversity through "highly interactive, though not truly mutualistic relationships...providing food resources to temporary and permanent resident species, ecosystem structure for nesting and habitat sites, shade for understory species and organic matter that alters soil composition and moisture. Grapevines, pomegranate bushes and fig trees as understory introduced species also provide food and habitat resources as well as contribute to the agroecosystem structure and function." Santa Gertrudis had lower levels of species diversity compared to other Baja mission oases, which may be due to systems of land tenure and "conflicts over land ownership". A study of bee biodiversity on the Baja California peninsula found "a relatively high proportion of rare species (singletons) at each assemblage, so we would expect great losses of species if either oases or deserts undergo severe degradation processes (e.g., habitat loss and landscape fragmentation)."

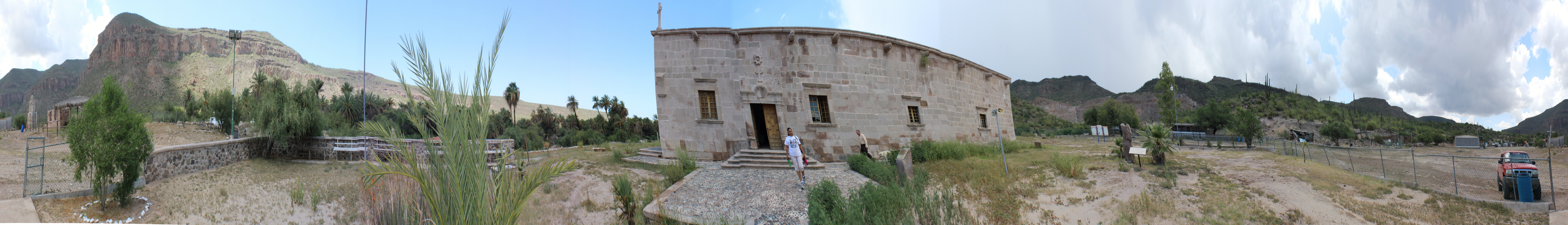
Panorama of the mission

== See also ==
- Mission San Borja Hot Springs
- Spanish missions in California
- List of Jesuit sites
