= Cochimí =

Pre-Columbian inhabitants of the central part of the Baja California peninsula

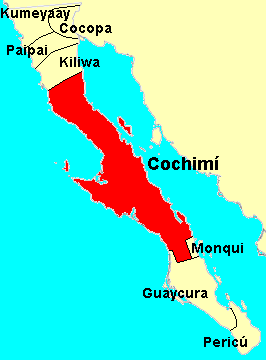
A map of the historical Cochimí territory.

The Cochimí were the indigenous inhabitants of the central Baja California peninsula, from El Rosario in the north to San Javier in the south. Information on Cochimí customs and beliefs has been preserved in brief observations by explorers and more extensive writings of the Jesuits (Aschmann 1959; Laylander 2000; Mathes 2006). Particularly important and detailed are the works of Miguel Venegas (1757, 1979) and Miguel del Barco (1973).

== History ==
The Cochimí were first encountered by Spanish seaborne explorers during the sixteenth century, including Ulloa, Cabrillo, Vizcaíno, and others. Sporadic encounters continued until the Jesuits established missions on the peninsula in the late seventeenth century. Eusebio Francisco Kino made an abortive foundation at San Bruno, to the north of Loreto, in 1683-1685. Juan María de Salvatierra began the first successful mission in 1697 at Loreto among the Monqui, who were southern neighbors of the Cochimí. This was quickly followed by Francesco Maria Piccolo's Cochimí mission at San Javier in 1699. Over the next seven decades, the frontier of Jesuit control over the Cochimí gradually extended northward, with missions at Mulegé (1705), Comondú (1708), La Purísima (1720), Guadalupe (1720), San Ignacio (1728), Santa Gertrudis (1751), San Borja (1762), and Santa María (1767). After the Spanish crown expelled the Jesuits from Baja California in 1768, the Franciscans under Junípero Serra established an additional mission at San Fernando Velicatá (1769) on their way north to Alta California. The Franciscans' successors in Baja California, the Dominicans, created the final new mission among the Cochimí at El Rosario (1774). Decimated by epidemics of Old World diseases, the Cochimí population declined, until sometime in the nineteenth or possibly the early twentieth century their language and traditional culture became extinct.

== Culture ==
The Cochimí were hunter-gatherers, without agriculture or metallurgy. Pottery-making may have reached the northern Cochimí before Spanish contact (Rogers 1945). Their material culture was generally simple, but it suited their arid environment and mobile lifestyle. The highest level of social organization was the autonomous local community, and inter-community conflicts appear to have been frequent. Among the unusual cultural traits noted for the Cochimí and some of their neighbors were the second harvest of the pitahaya, the maroma, wooden tablas, and human-hair capes:

- The fruit of pitahaya cactus provided a highly valued but short-lived seasonal food resource. Subsequent to the pitahaya harvest, Baja Californians winnowed undigested pitahaya seeds from their own dried excrement and then roasted and ate this "second harvest".
- Another unusual food trait was the maroma. A valued morsel of meat was tied with a string, swallowed, then pulled back up and passed to the next person in a circle of consumers, until the meat finally disintegrated.
- Tablas were wooden tablets with painted designs and/or drilled holes, used in religious ceremonies. Some of these artifacts have been found archaeologically (Massey 1972; Hedges 1973; Meigs 1974).
- Capes made from donated human hair were worn by shamans on ceremonial occasions (Meigs 1970).

== Language ==
The Cochimí spoke a set of dialects or closely related languages that have been classified in a variety of ways. The most prominent division, between Northern Cochimí and Southern Cochimí, has generally been put to the south of San Ignacio (Mixco 1978, 1979, 2006; Laylander 1997). At one time designated "Peninsular Yuman", Cochimí bears an evident relationship to the Yuman languages of northern Baja California, southern California, and western Arizona. Mauricio J. Mixco (1978, 2006) reassessed this relationship and judged it to be too distant for Cochimí to be included within the Yuman family proper. He placed Cochimí as a sister language to the Yuman family, thus forming the Yuman–Cochimí family.
