= Alfredo García =

Alfredo García may refer to:

- Alfredo García-Baró (born 1972), Cuban sprinter
- Alfredo García Green (born 1953), Mexican politician
- Alfredo García-Heredia (born 1981), Spanish golfer and European tour player

== See also ==
- Bring Me the Head of Alfredo Garcia, a 1974 U.S.–Mexican motion picture
