= Ensenada Blanca =

Ensenada Blanca, Baja California Sur
- City
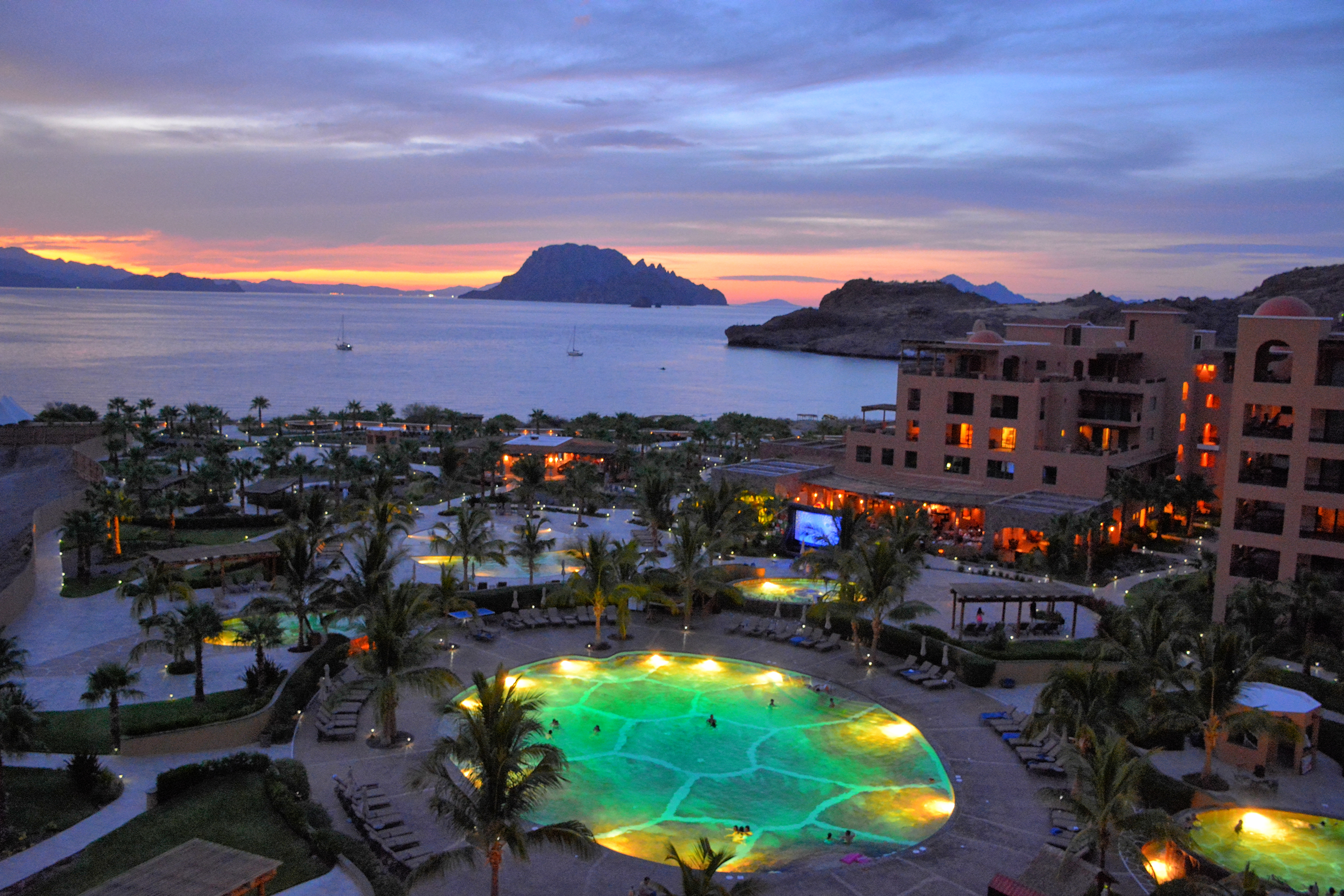
- Villa del Palmar at the Islands of Loreto
- Nickname: The Gateway to the Sea of Cortés
- Location in Mexico
- Coordinates: 25°43′34″N 111°14′50″W
- Country: Mexico
- State: Baja California
- Municipality: Loreto
- Founded: 1916
- Time zone: UTC−8 (PST)
  - Summer (DST): UTC−7 (PDT)

Ensenada Blanca (Spanish for 'White Cove') is a community of Loreto Municipality, in Baja California Sur state, Mexico.

It is located about 45 km south of the city of Loreto.

== Population ==
Ensenada Blanca had a 2010 census population of 255 inhabitants. It is the second-largest community in Loreto Municipality, after the municipal seat of Loreto.
