= Loreto Municipality, Baja California Sur =

Municipality in the Mexican state of Baja California Sur

Coordinates: 26°00′46″N 111°20′36″W

Loreto
- Municipality
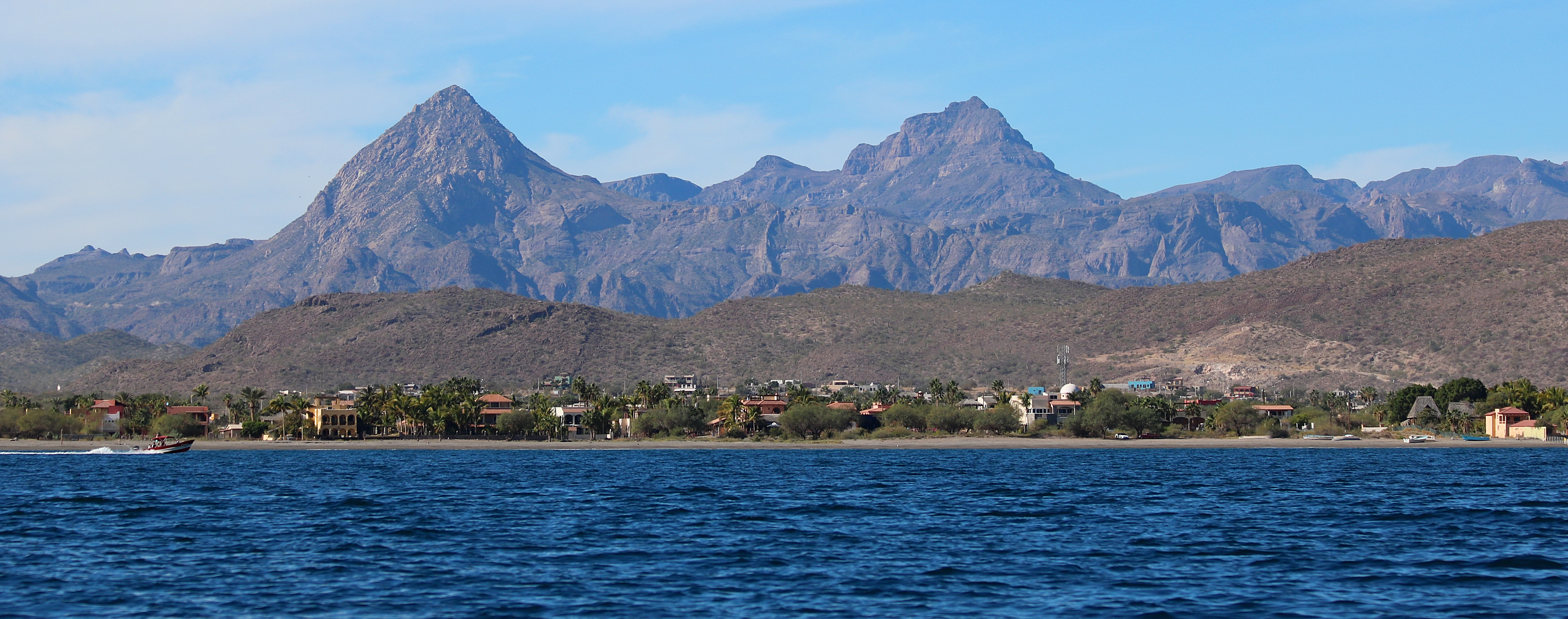
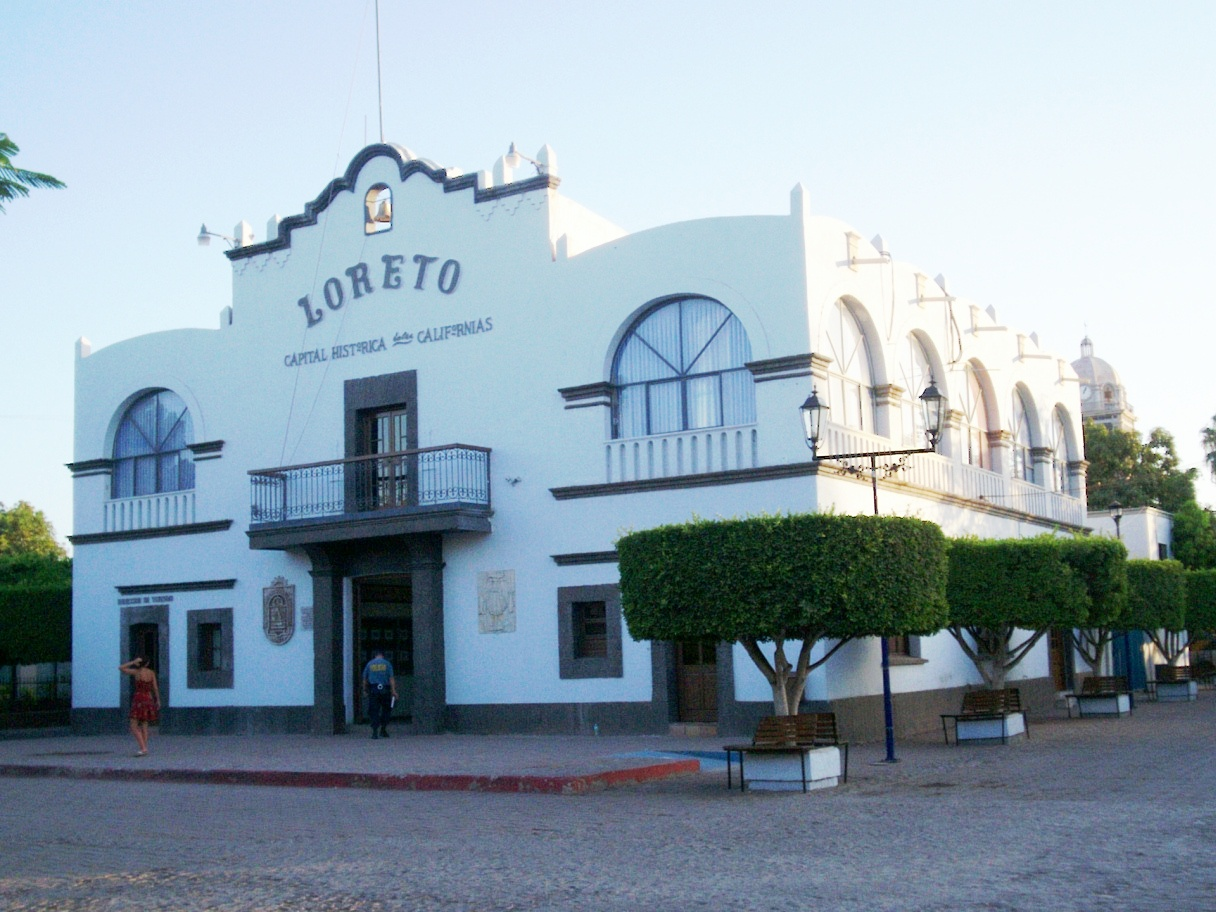
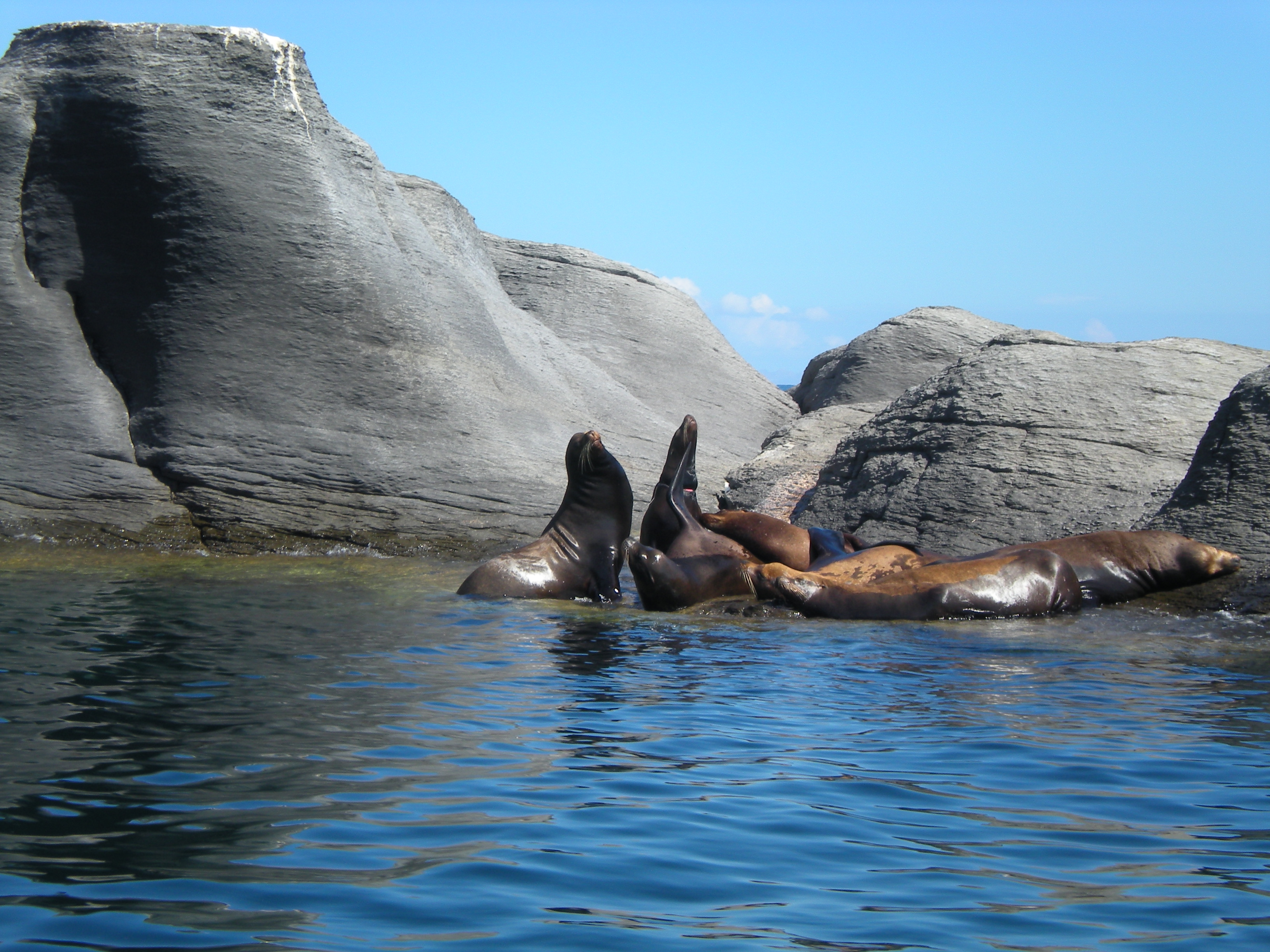
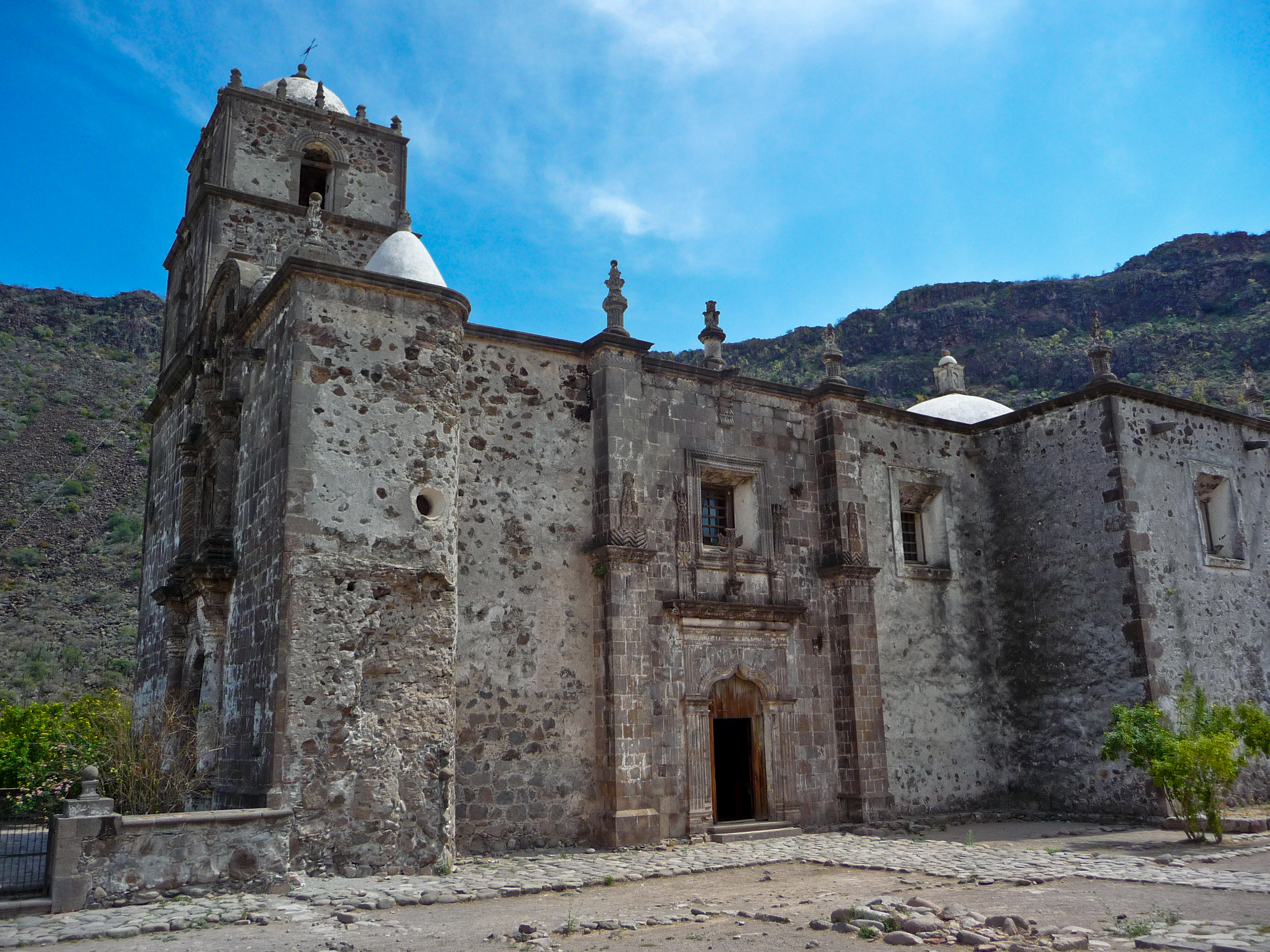
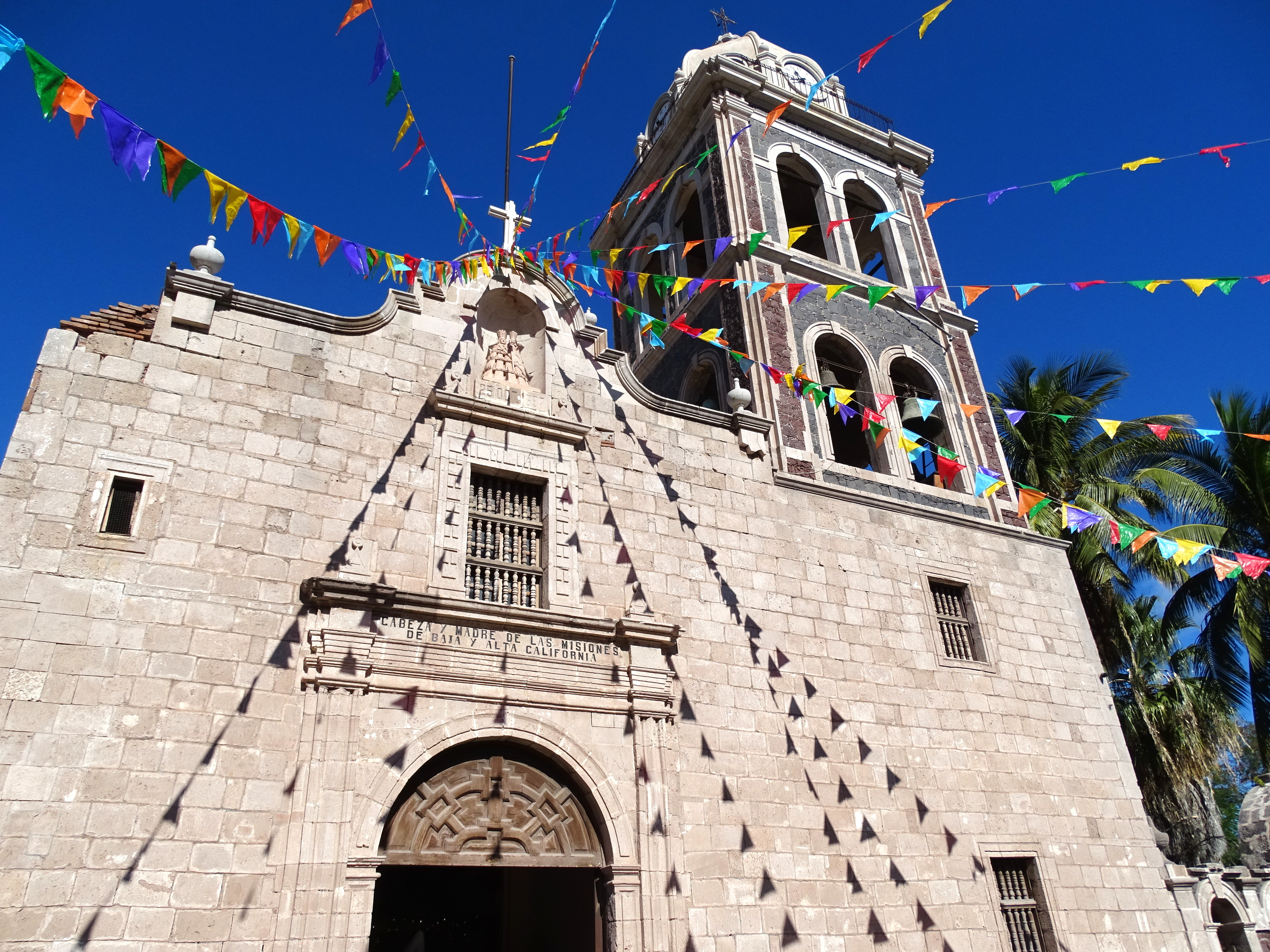
- Top: Panoramic view of Sierra de la Giganta from Loreto Bay; Middle: Loreto, Coronado Island; Bottom: Mission San Francisco Javier of Viggé-Biuandó, Mission Our Lady of Loreto Conchó

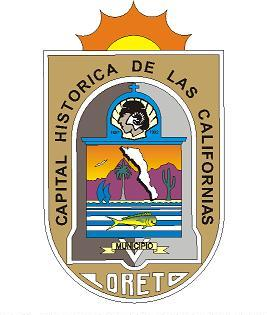
- Coat of arms

- Location of Loreto in Baja California Sur.
- Country: Mexico
- State: Baja California Sur
- Municipal seat and largest city: Loreto

Government
  - Mayor: Paola Margarita Cota Davis (PAN)

Area
  - Total: 4,418.98 km^{2} (1,706.18 sq mi)

Population (2020)
  - Total: 18,052
  - Density: 4.08/km^{2} (10.6/sq mi)
  - Seat: 16,311
- Time zone: UTC−07:00 (Zona Pacífico)

Loreto (Spanish pronunciation: [loˈɾeto]) is a municipality in the Mexican state of Baja California Sur. It was created in 1992 from the partition of the neighboring Comondú Municipality. The municipal seat is in the town of Loreto, which was the former capital of Las Californias during Spanish colonial times.

The 2020 census reported a population of 18,052, about 94% of whom lived in the town of Loreto. The municipality has an area of 4,311 km^{2} (1,664 sq mi).

== Demographics ==
As 2020, the city of Loreto with a population of 16,311 concentrates 94% of the municipal population. There are other 136 small communities, which the largest are Ligüí (248 hab.), Ensenada Blanca (227 hab.), Puerto Agua Verde (210 hab.), San Javier (155 hab.) and Nopoló (103 hab.).

Historical population
Year	Pop.	±%
1995	9,986	—
2000	11,812	+18.3%
2005	11,839	+0.2%
2010	16,738	+41.4%
2015	18,912	+13.0%
2020	18,052	−4.5%

== Sister City ==
- Ventura, California (United States)

== See also ==
Alfredo Garcia Green, first municipal president of Loreto.
