= San Javier, Baja California Sur =

- Town
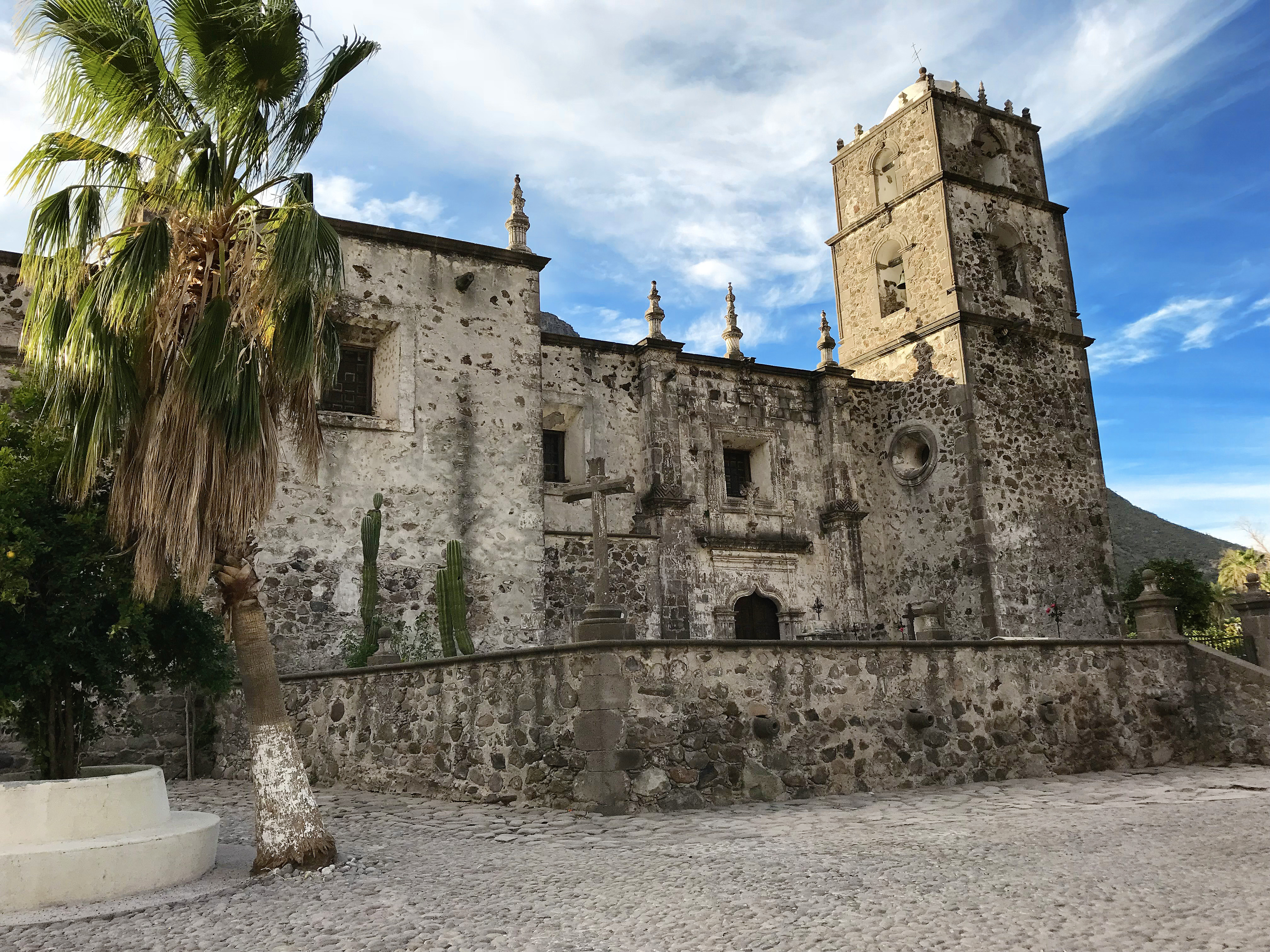
- Misión San Francisco Javier de Viggé-Biaundó

- Location in Mexico San Javier (Mexico)
- Coordinates: 25°51′40″N 111°32′37″W
- Country: Mexico
- State: Baja California Sur
- Municipality: Loreto

Population (2020)
  - Total: 155
- Time zone: UTC-8 (Northwest US Pacific)
  - Summer (DST): UTC-7 (Northwest)

San Javier is a town in Loreto Municipality, Baja California Sur. Located in Western Mexico, the village had a population of 155 inhabitants at the census of 2020. San Ignacio is home to Misión San Francisco Javier de Viggé-Biaundó.

== Transportation ==
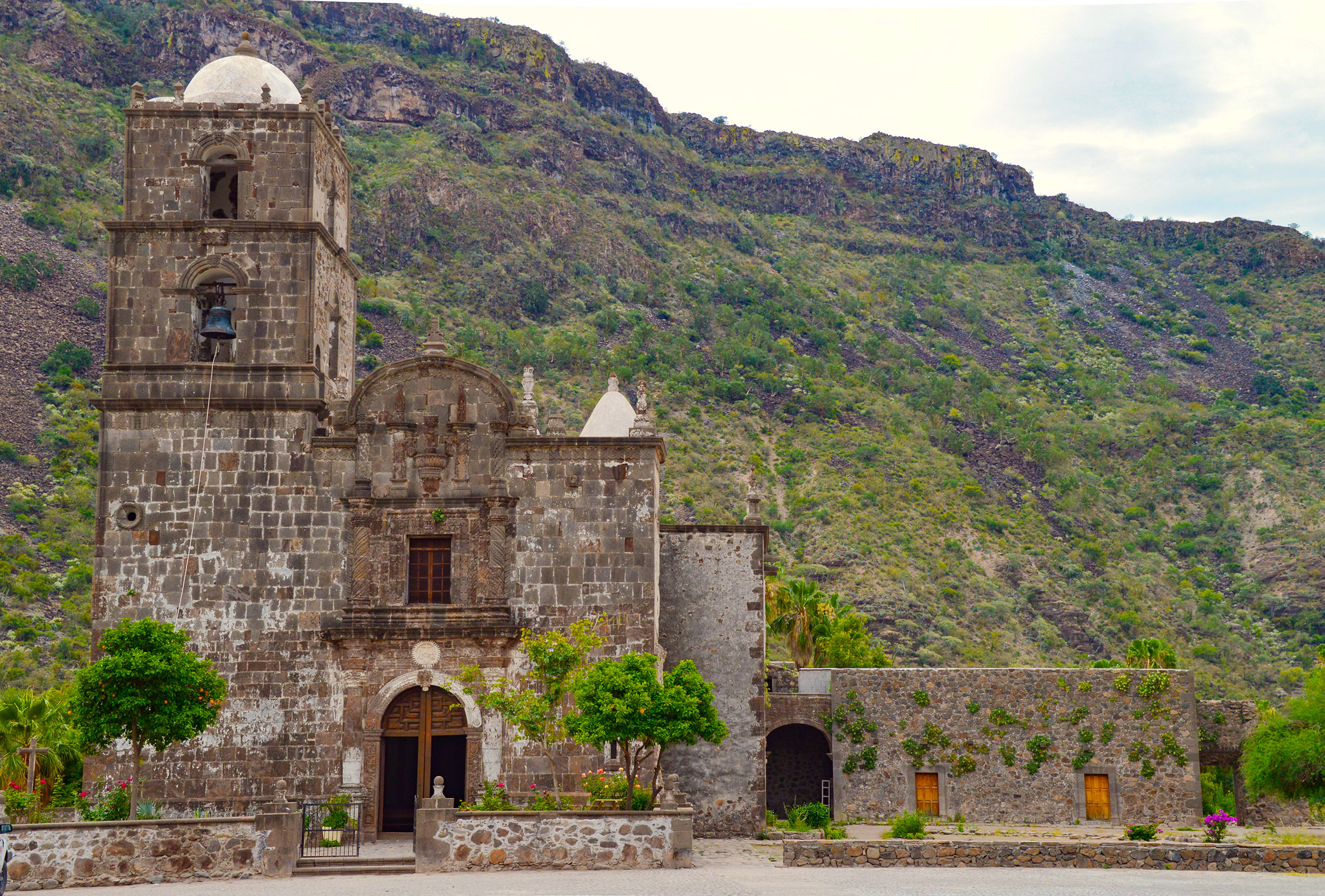
Misión San Francisco Javier de Viggé-Biaundó, built 1744–58.

It is approximately 36 km southwest of Loreto on a paved road.
