= Alfredo García Green =

Mexican politician

1st Municipal president of Loreto
- In office April 1993 – April 1996
- Preceded by: None
- Succeeded by: Ramón Davis Drew

Personal details
- Born: 29 December 1953 (age 72) Baja California Sur
- Party: National Action Party
- Occupation: Businessman, Politician, Public servant

Alfredo García Green (born 29 December 1953) is a Mexican politician affiliated with the National Action Party (PAN). He was the first municipal president of Loreto, Baja California Sur, following the municipality's 1992 creation, and the state's party president. García Green is the son of Consuelo Green Garayzar and stepson of Francisco Larrinaga. He has worked with the environmental NGO "Grupo Ecologista Antares", which is involved in conservation efforts in the Loreto region.

== Career ==
Before entering politics, García Green owned an auto parts store. In 1993, he was elected the municipal president of Loreto and served his full three-year term. He was one of the few municipal presidents to avoid a major financial upheaval during office without getting any public debt (the only one in the state during that term) and left the office to his successor without any financial trouble. During his term, he applied innovation in public services in order to improve the city deficient services (waste collection, water supply, municipal taxes registration system, street cleaning, street pavement). He worked with the NGO "Grupo Ecologista Antares" in order to promote a national park in the Loreto area, which was finally created in July 1996 by presidential decree. He had problems with the public workers' union (which members worked for the then ruling Partido Revolucionario Institucional party) and with Governor of Baja California Sur, Guillermo Mercado Romero, who denied central government grants to the city of Loreto.

From 1999 to 2002, García Green was the President of the Partido Acción Nacional State committee in Baja California Sur. He then served as the Chief in Baja California Sur of the Office of Housing Institute for the Workers (INFONAVIT) from 2002 to 2007. After that, he was the Chief of BMO, S.A. DE C.V. in Loreto.
