= Loreto, Baja California Sur =

- Town
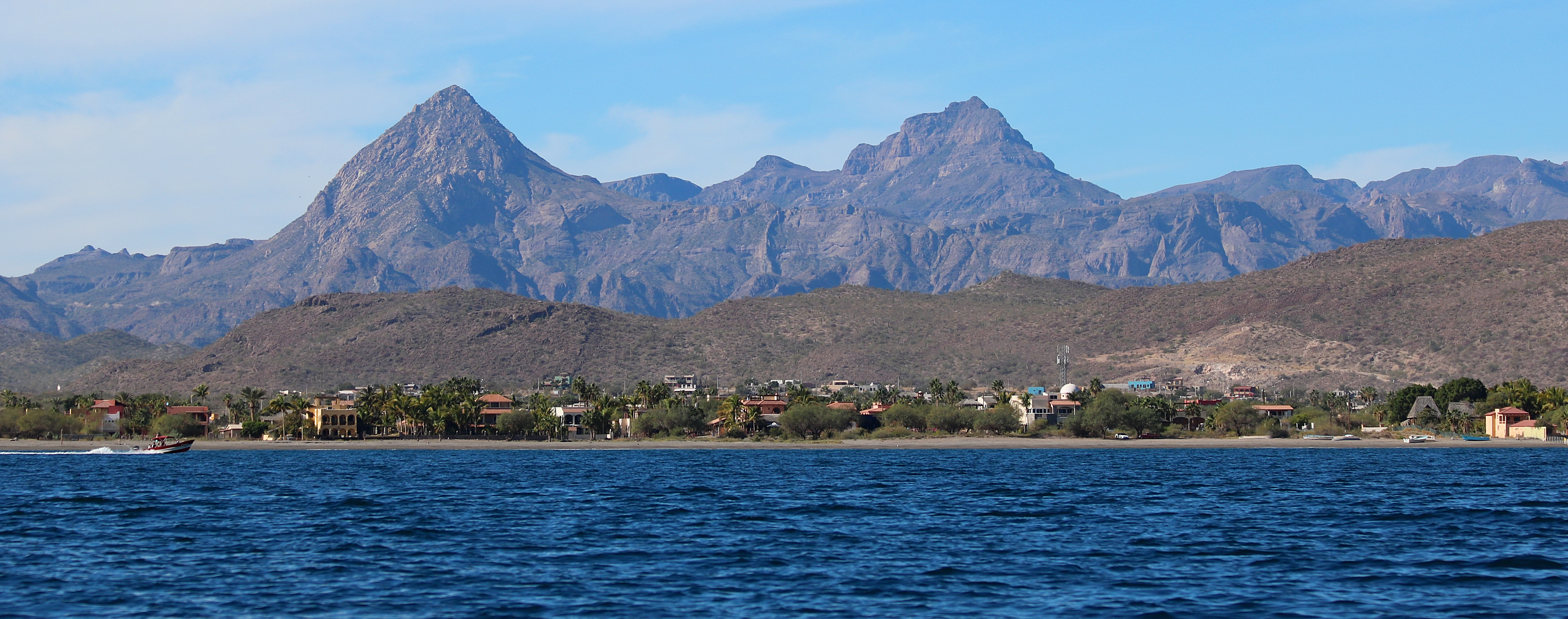
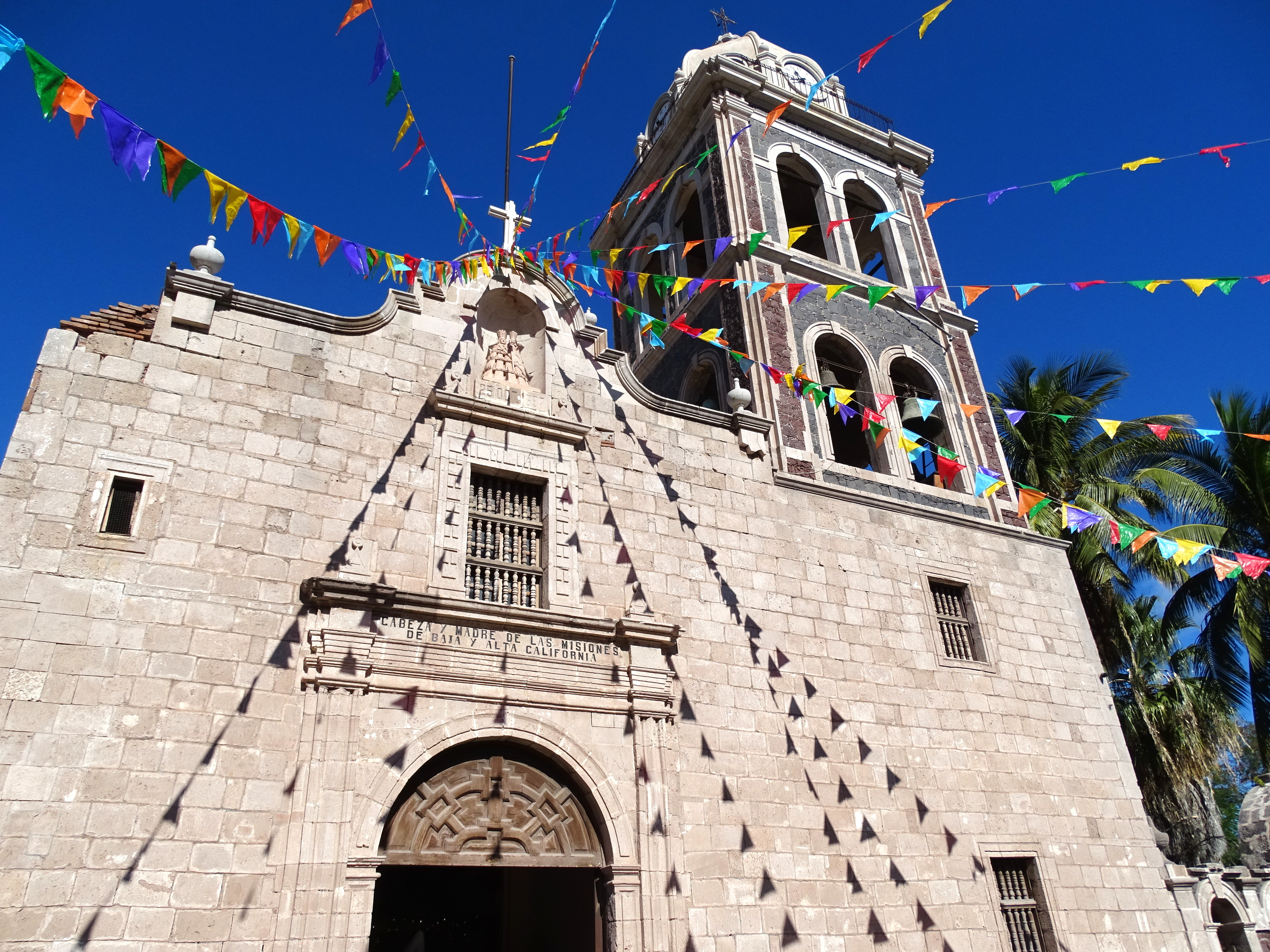
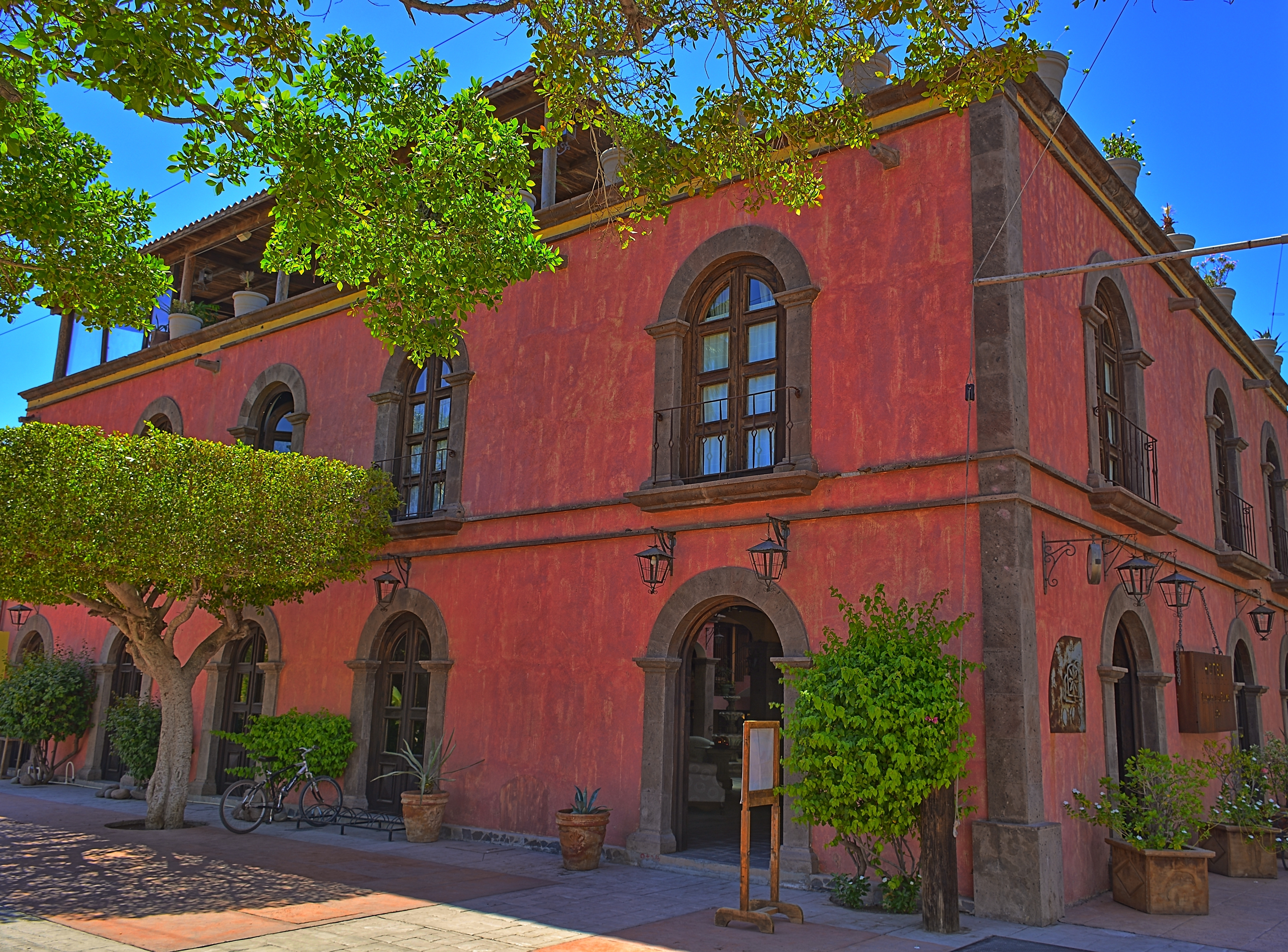
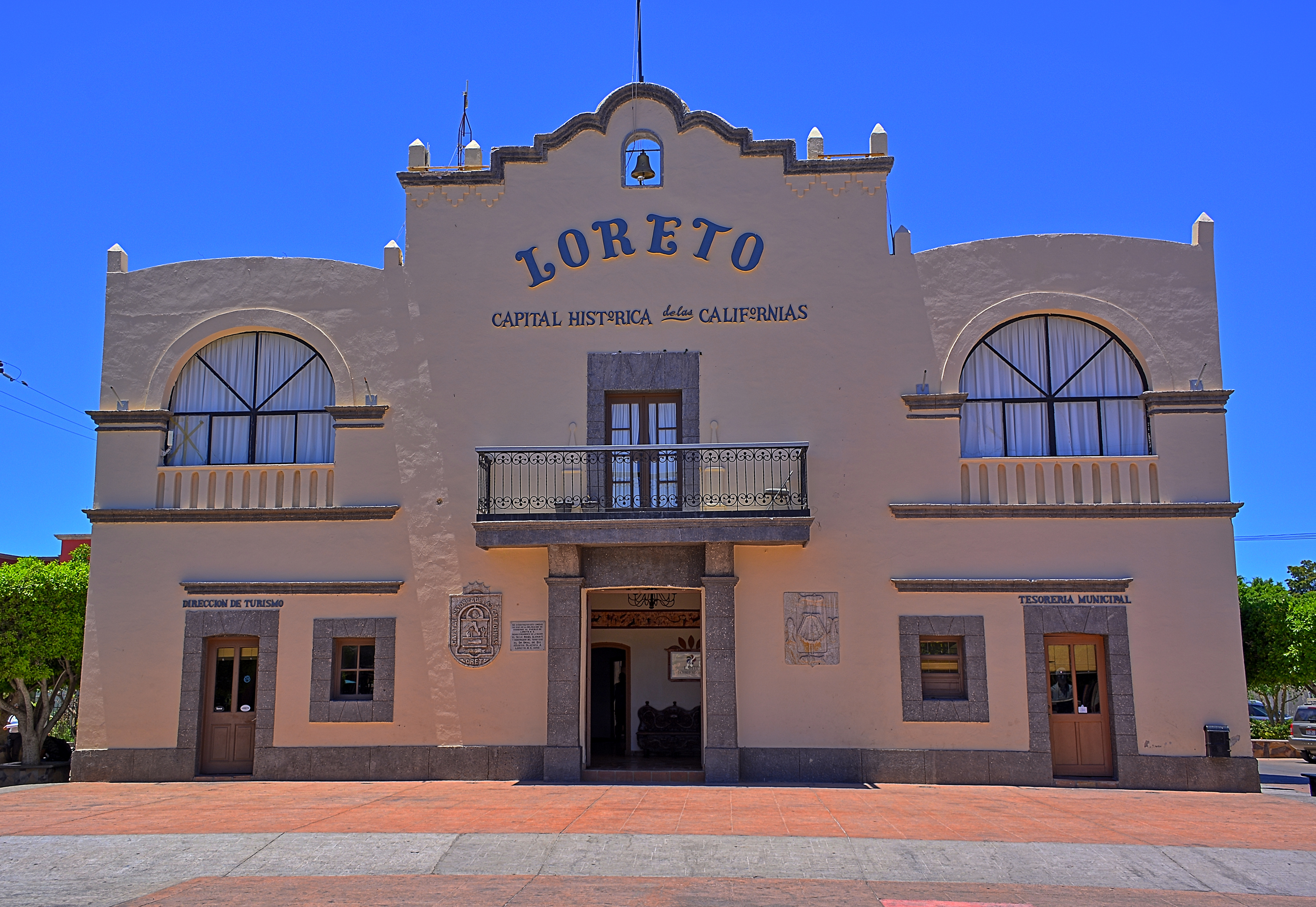
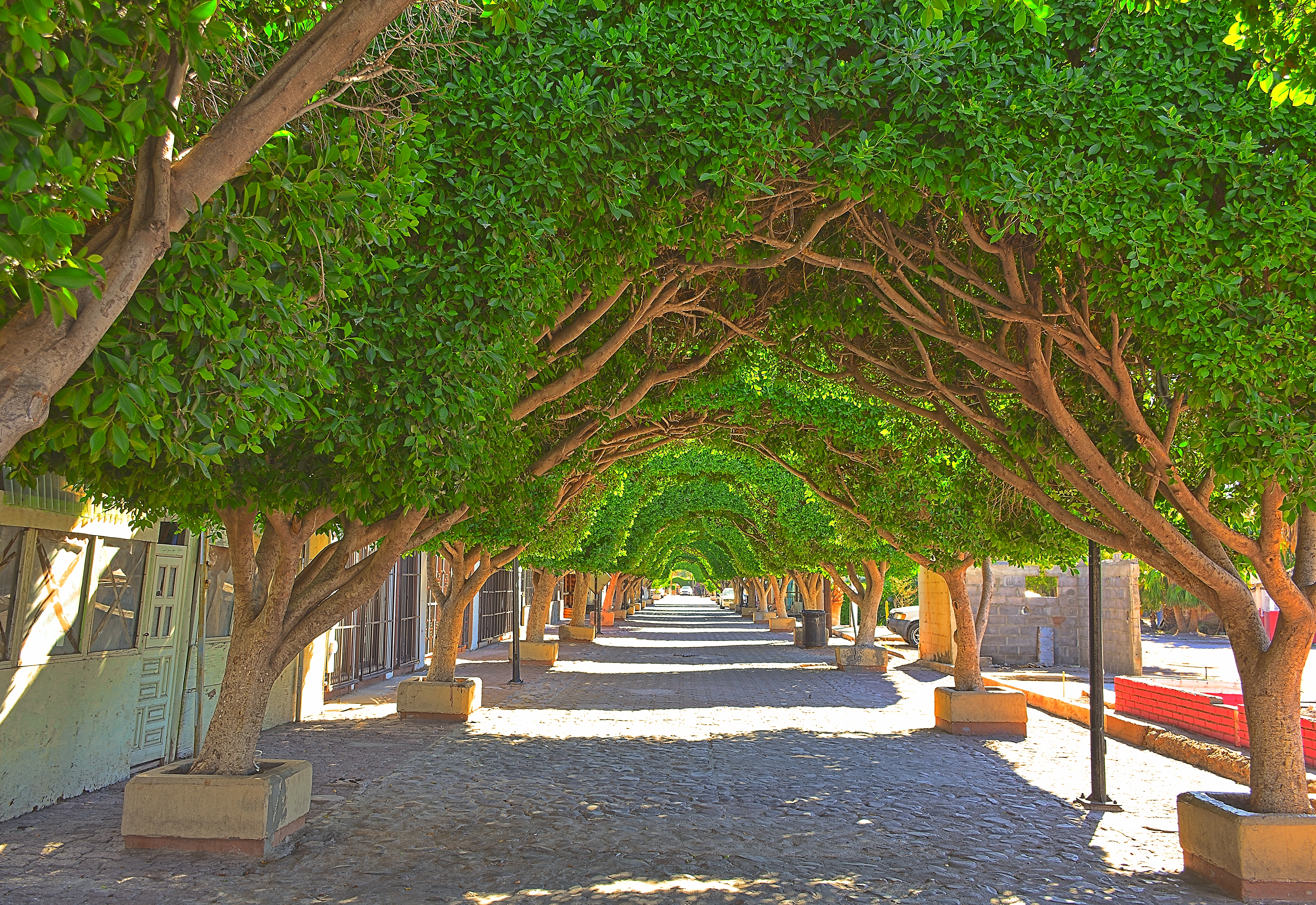
- Top: view of Loreto from the Gulf of California; middle: Misión de Nuestra Señora de Loreto Conchó (left) and Posada de las Flores (right); bottom: City Hall (left) and downtown (right).

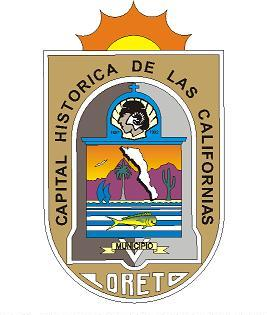
- Coat of arms

- Location of Loreto in Mexico Loreto, Baja California Sur (Mexico)
- Coordinates: 26°00′46″N 111°20′36″W
- Country: Mexico
- State: Baja California Sur
- Municipality: Loreto Municipality
- Founded: October 25, 1697
- Founded as: Real de Loreto
- Founder: Juan María de Salvatierra

Government
  - Mayor: Arely Arce Peralta
- Elevation: 3 m (9.8 ft)

Population (2020)
  - Total: 16,311
  - Demonym: Loretano
- Time zone: UTC−07:00 (Zona Pacífico)
- Postal code: 23880
- Area code: 613
- Website: www.loreto.gob.mx

Loreto is a city and municipal seat of Loreto Municipality, Baja California Sur, on the West Coast of Mexico. Located on the Gulf of California, the city had a population of 16,311 inhabitants in 2020. Loreto is a regional economic and cultural center, as well as a major tourist destination on the Baja California Peninsula.

Loreto was founded in 1697, when Juan María de Salvatierra founded Misión de Nuestra Señora de Loreto Conchó. The city served as the capital of Province of the Californias until 1777, when the capital moved to Monterey, California. Loreto continued to serve as the capital of Baja California until 1829. The city grew rapidly in the 20th century and is today a major tourist destination and regional hub.

== History ==
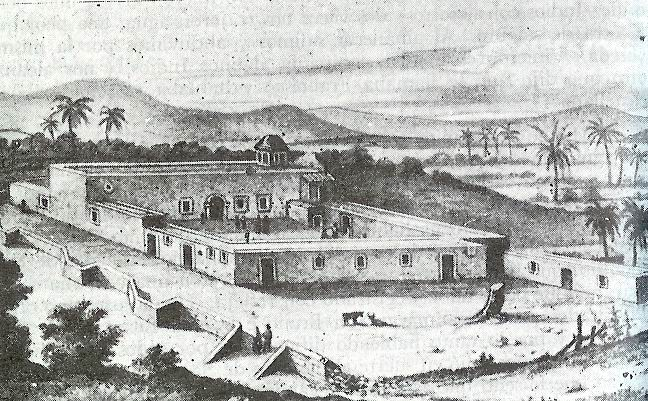
Misión de Nuestra Señora de Loreto Conchó was founded in 1697 by Juan María de Salvatierra.

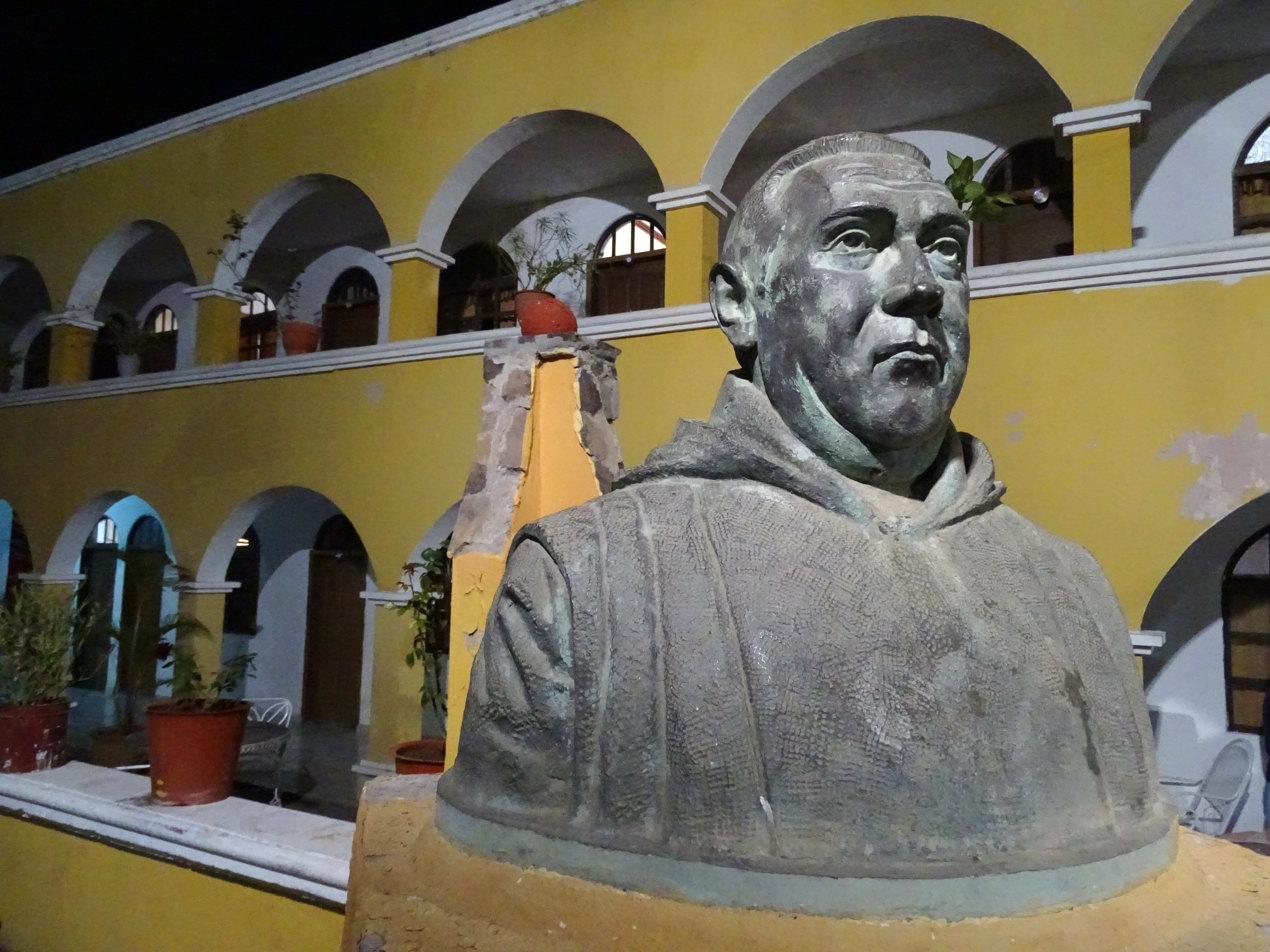
Historic center of Loreto.

Loreto was the first Spanish colonial settlement of the Viceroyalty of New Spain on the Baja California Peninsula.

The town was founded in 1697 by Jesuit missionaries, who found a steady spring of fresh water on this site, as the Misión Nuestra Señora de Loreto. The Jesuits were expelled in 1767, and control of the Baja California missions was given to the Franciscans.

In 1769, the Franciscans were ordered to turn over the Baja missions to the Dominican Order and accompany the expedition of Gaspar de Portolá to establish new missions in the unexplored northern frontier that became Alta California. The expedition departed from Loreto on March 24, 1769.

The town served as the capital of the province of Las Californias from its founding until the capital was moved to Monterey on February 3, 1777. In 1768, the province had been split into Alta California (today's U.S. state of California) and Baja California. At first, the two provinces continued with a single governor. Later, the town became the headquarters for the Lieutenant Governor of California Viejo (the province of Baja California).

The Municipality was created in 1992 and Loreto citizens elected their first Mayor (Municipal President) in 1993. The Federal Electoral Institute, as of February 3, 2008, recorded 9,073 registered voters for the Municipality of Loreto.

== Geography ==
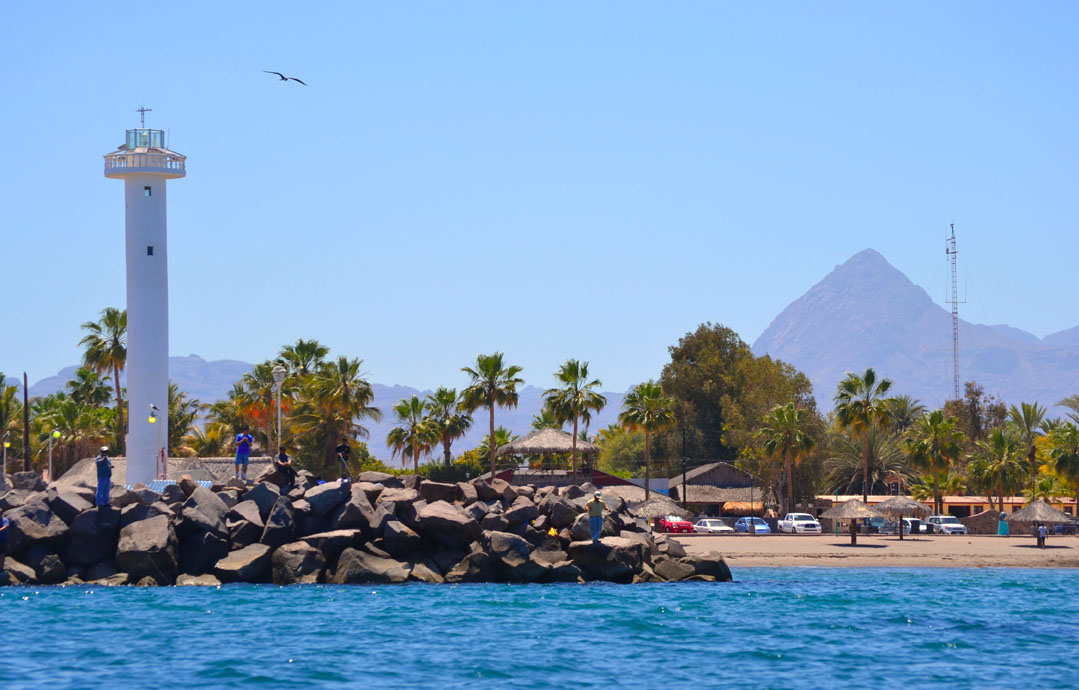
View of the lighthouse and the Sierra de la Giganta from the Gulf of California.

Loreto is located on the east coast of the Baja California Peninsula, at 26º00'46" N 111º20'36" W. It is bordered on the east by the Gulf of California, on the west by the Transpeninsular Highway, and on the south by the Arroyo Loreto, a dry creek bed that only fills with water after a heavy rainfall. The city is built on relatively flat land with an average elevation of 10 meters (33 ft) above sea level. "La Giganta" Mountain Range ("Sierra de la Giganta") lies to the west, extending along the center of the state of Baja California Sur, parallel to the gulf coast.

The geology and topography of the Loreto region, extending from Bahía Concepción to Agua Verde, is a coastal belt consisting "mainly of a narrow belt of ridges, valleys, and pediments adjacent to the escarpment, low- to moderate-elevation ranges transverse to the coast, and narrow coastal plains".

The city is a tourist resort, catering mostly to American travelers, with daily flights from California to Loreto International Airport. Many American tourists enjoy fishing in "pangas" for "dorado" (Mahi-mahi or Dolphin Fish). Local restaurants willingly prepare the daily catch of the tourists. Loreto has a museum that coexists alongside the historic, but still active, parish. Loreto has active sister city relationships with the California cities of Hermosa Beach, Cerritos, and Ventura.

=== Climate ===
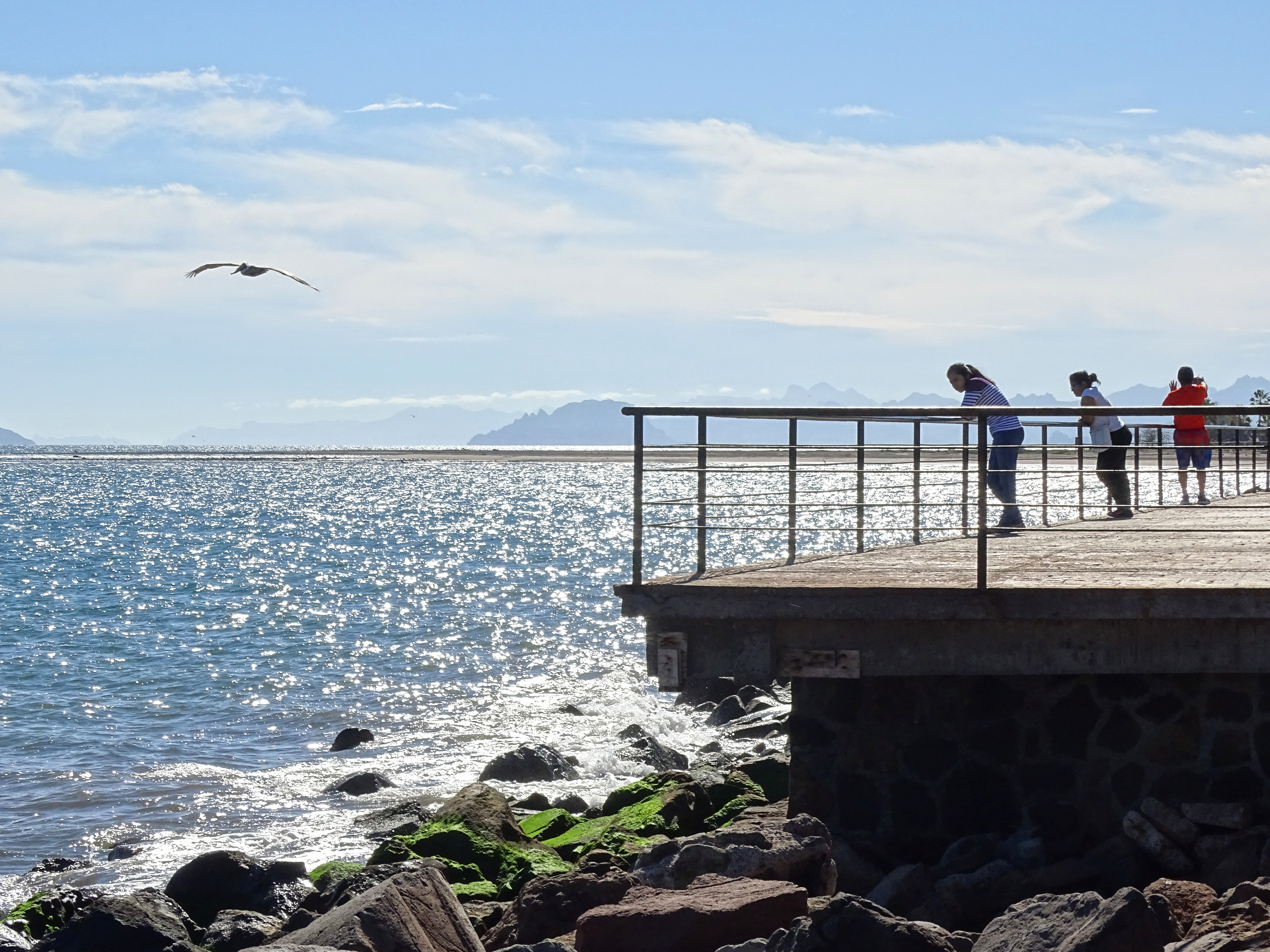
View of the Gulf of California from the Malecón de Loreto.

Loreto has a hot arid climate (Köppen BWh), which is humid with abundant sunshine. The median temperature is 24.4 °C (75.9 °F). The temperatures are hot from June through October. Summer days have highs around 34 °C (93.2 °F) with high humidity. According to the National Meteorological Service, Loreto's highest official temperature reading of 44.2 °C (111.6 °F) was recorded on June 2, 2006; the lowest temperature ever recorded was 0.0 °C (32 °F) on December 15, 1987. In spring season, the temperatures are moderate and temperate. Autumn and winter months are usually windy.

From January to March, winds blow from the northwest (night hours) and the north (day hours), the rest of the year, the winds blow usually from the west. Loreto's yearly rainfall is low; averaging about 160 mm (6.3 in), with exceptionally large interannual variability even for an arid region. The wettest months are August and September, when there are occasional short-lived rainfalls. One concern for Loreto is the Pacific hurricane season, which runs from June 1 to November 30, and sometimes causes heavy rainfall and floods in the area. The last time the town area was hit by a hurricane was on September 2 and 3, 2006, when Hurricane John hit the Baja California Peninsula.

Climate data for Loreto, Baja California Sur (1991–2020)
Month	Jan	Feb	Mar	Apr	May	Jun	Jul	Aug	Sep	Oct	Nov	Dec	Year
Record high °C (°F)	31.0 (87.8)	34.6 (94.3)	37.0 (98.6)	39.5 (103.1)	45.0 (113.0)	44.2 (111.6)	44.0 (111.2)	44.0 (111.2)	46.0 (114.8)	41.0 (105.8)	39.0 (102.2)	36.5 (97.7)	45.0 (113.0)
Mean daily maximum °C (°F)	24.4 (75.9)	25.4 (77.7)	27.7 (81.9)	30.0 (86.0)	32.9 (91.2)	35.7 (96.3)	36.6 (97.9)	36.8 (98.2)	35.7 (96.3)	33.4 (92.1)	28.9 (84.0)	24.6 (76.3)	31.0 (87.8)
Daily mean °C (°F)	18.2 (64.8)	18.9 (66.0)	20.7 (69.3)	23.0 (73.4)	25.8 (78.4)	29.5 (85.1)	31.6 (88.9)	32.0 (89.6)	30.7 (87.3)	27.4 (81.3)	22.8 (73.0)	18.7 (65.7)	24.9 (76.8)
Mean daily minimum °C (°F)	11.9 (53.4)	12.3 (54.1)	13.7 (56.7)	16.0 (60.8)	18.7 (65.7)	23.2 (73.8)	26.7 (80.1)	27.3 (81.1)	25.8 (78.4)	21.5 (70.7)	16.7 (62.1)	12.8 (55.0)	18.9 (66.0)
Record low °C (°F)	2.0 (35.6)	3.0 (37.4)	4.5 (40.1)	6.5 (43.7)	10.0 (50.0)	11.0 (51.8)	14.5 (58.1)	16.0 (60.8)	16.0 (60.8)	11.5 (52.7)	7.0 (44.6)	0.0 (32.0)	0.0 (32.0)
Average precipitation mm (inches)	9.0 (0.35)	5.4 (0.21)	0.4 (0.02)	0.5 (0.02)	0.2 (0.01)	2.2 (0.09)	6.7 (0.26)	40.8 (1.61)	91.8 (3.61)	23.9 (0.94)	5.7 (0.22)	9.2 (0.36)	195.8 (7.71)
Average precipitation days (≥ 0.1 mm)	1.9	1.5	0.6	0.5	0.3	0.4	2.0	3.4	3.9	1.3	1.5	1.7	19.0
Average relative humidity (%)	68	67	66	65	66	65	64	64	69	66	66	68	66
Mean monthly sunshine hours	238	254	286	276	303	324	348	352	313	291	237	250	3,472
Source 1: Servicio Meteorológico Nacional (humidity 1981–2000)
Source 2: Ogimet (sun 1991–2020)

== Demographics ==
Historical population
Year	Pop.	±%
2005	10,283	—
2010	14,724	+43.2%
2015	18,535	+25.9%
2019	20,385	+10.0%

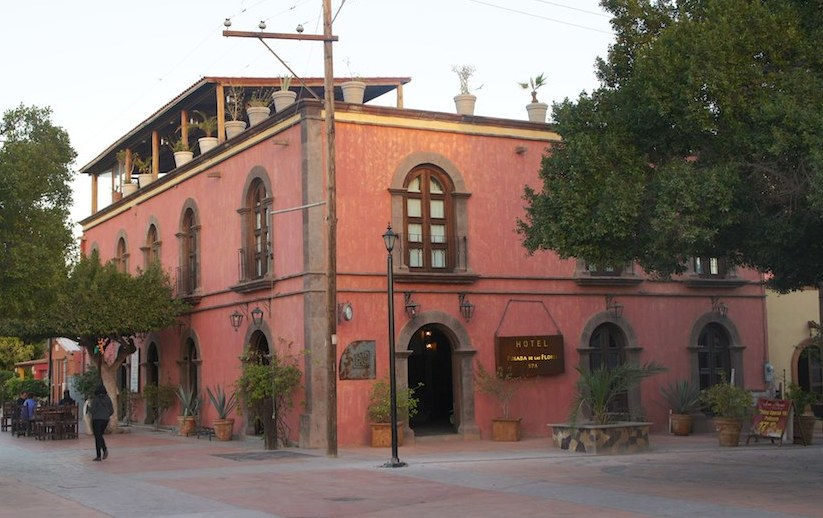
Hotel Posada de las Flores.

According to INEGI, the 2015 city population was 18,535 people with 2565 households, with 77.67% male and 22.32% female householders. The population is young: 29.75% are from 0 to 14 years of age, 19.19% from 15 to 24, and only 6.42% are 60 years of age or older. For every 100 females there are 102.5 males, and for every 100 females age 18 and over, there are 100.5 males. The Municipality of Loreto (which includes Nopoló, Puerto Escondido, San Javier and the rest of the little villages from the coast and mountains) has a population of 21,071 people.

Due to Loreto's small population and low immigration, large families are characteristic, and residents often have the same last name, a phenomenon also found in other state localities. The two largest families are the "Davis", predominating in the east of the city, along the beach ("Calle Davis" is a street with this last name), and the "Murillo", predominating in the south along the Arroyo Loreto, in the neighborhood known as "barrio del Muro", named after the retaining wall built to hold flood waters from the creek. Other large families are the Amador, the Arce, the Cota, the Higuera, the Romero and the Villalejo.

== Culture ==
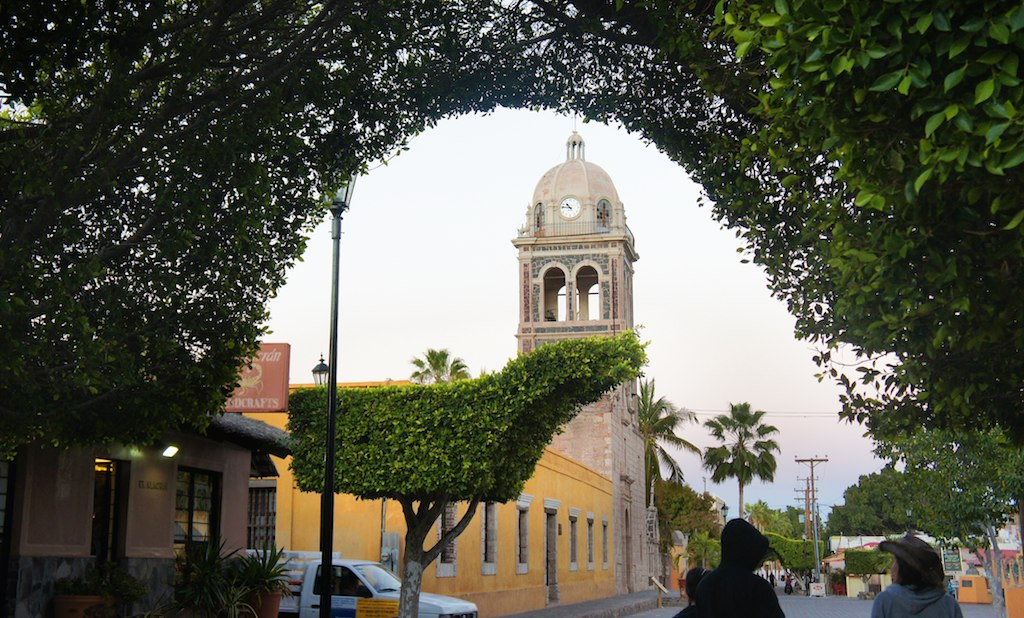
Misión de Nuestra Señora de Loreto.

There are seven buildings in Loreto from the 18th to 20th century that are considered historical monuments by the federal government; the most important is the Mission of our Lady of Loreto at the start of El Camino Real ("The Royal Road"), an historic corridor that follows north along the ancient route of the Spanish missions, to its ending in Sonoma, California, USA. In the neighboring town of San Javier are five historical buildings, most importantly the Mission of Saint Francis Xavier (Misión de San Francisco Javier), the best preserved mission in the peninsula. The ruins of Mission of San Bruno, the first mission of Baja California, founded in 1683 by Jesuit missionary explorer Padre Eusebio Kino. It was ordered abandoned by the Spanish Crown two years later. It is located 20 kilometers north of Loreto.

The Jesuit Missions Museum (Museo de las Misiones Jesuíticas) is located beside the Mission of our Lady of Loreto. It has a collection of religious art, weapons and tools from the 17th and 18th centuries that were used in the Spanish missions in Baja California.

In the "La Giganta" mountains ("Sierra de la Giganta"), there are cave paintings in canyons and rock shelters. The nearest sites to Loreto are "Cuevas Pintas" (15 km to the west) and "La Pingüica" (60 km to the north). Some of the cave paintings from the indigenous groups of Baja California have been added to UNESCO's list of world heritage sites.

== Tourism ==
=== Events ===
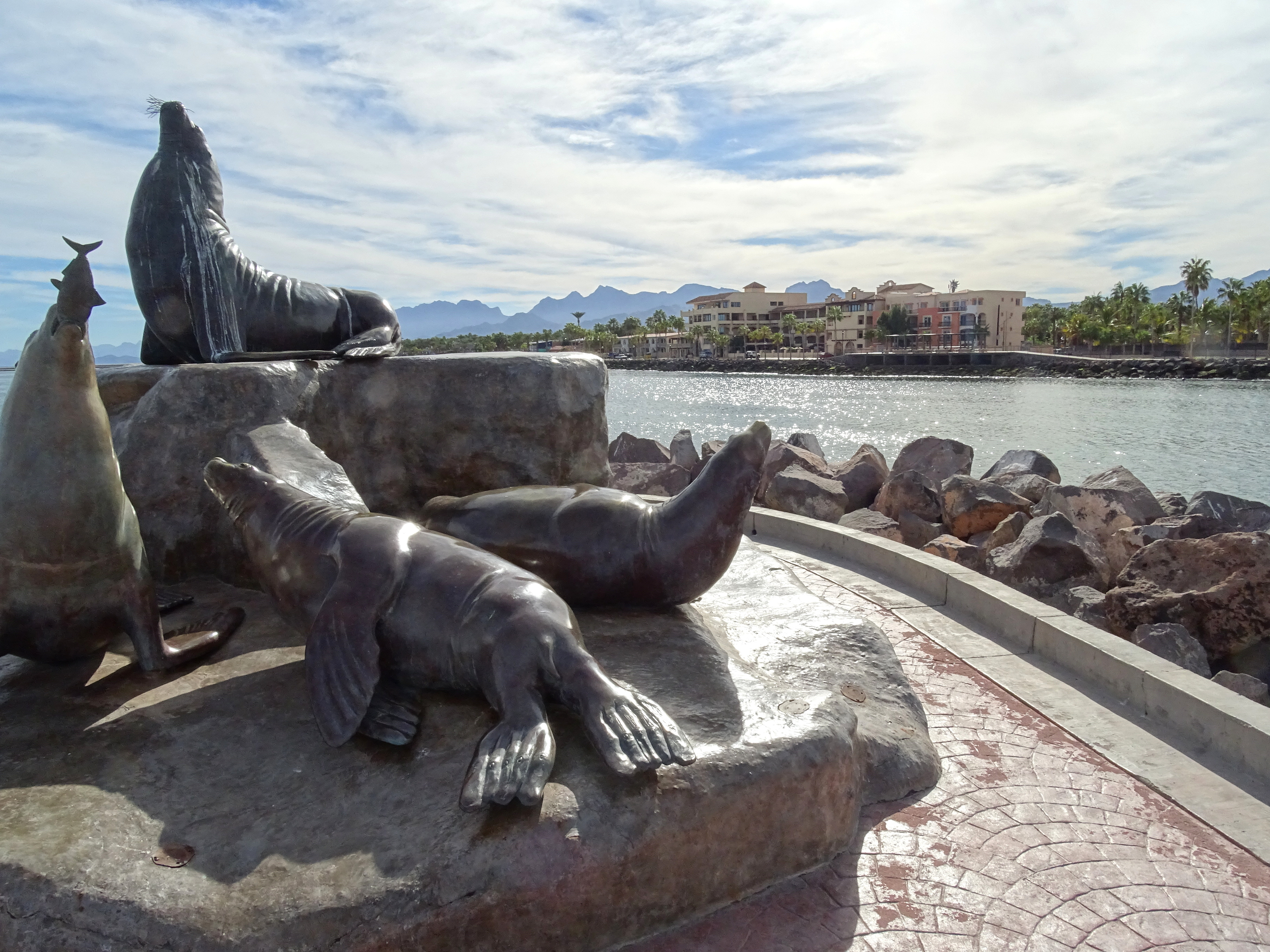
Malecón de Loreto.

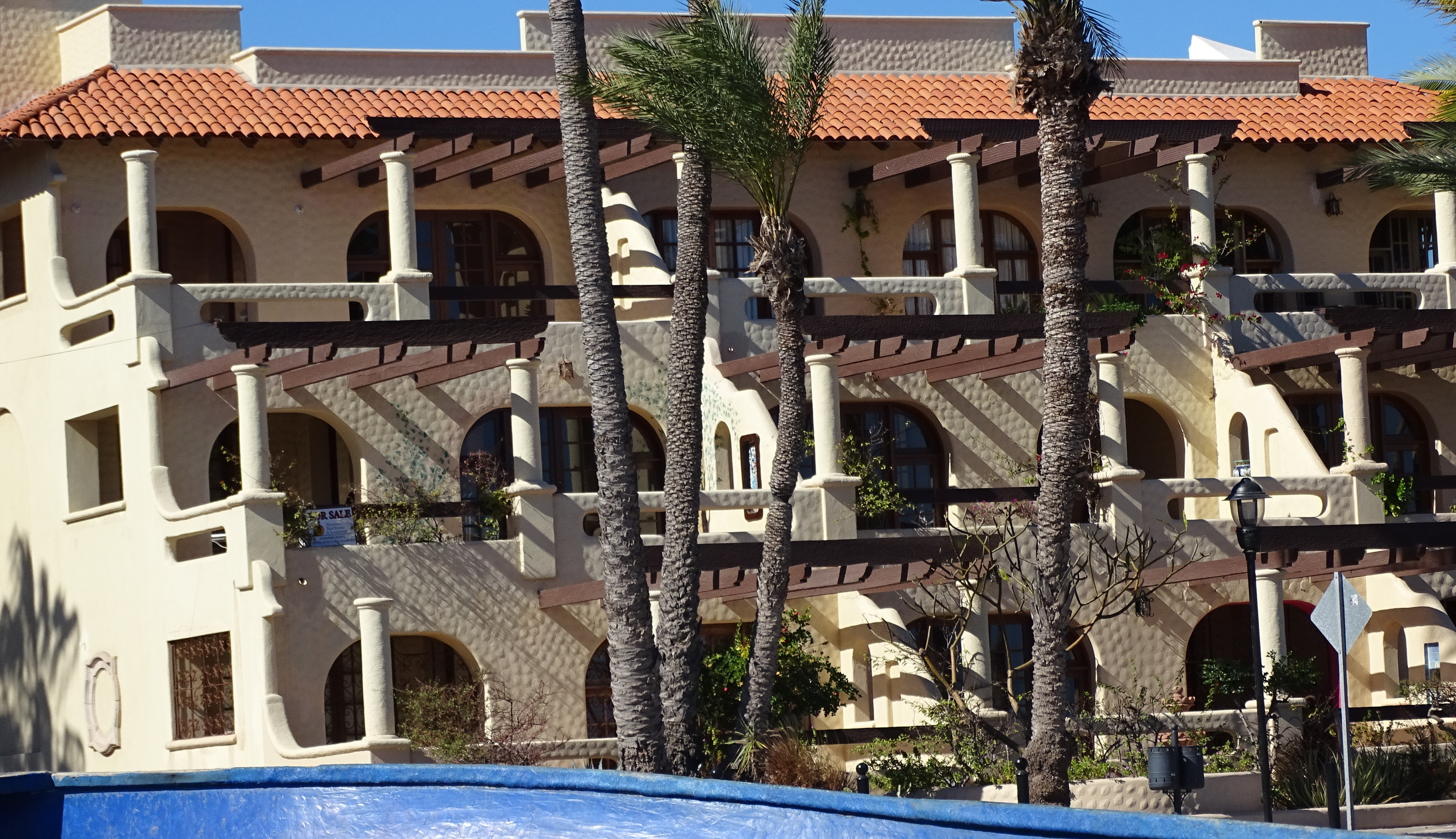
Hotel by the Loreto marina.

- Fiestas de la Virgen de Loreto. The Our Lady of Loreto Festivities are celebrated on September 8. It's a series of religious, civic and cultural events.
- Fiestas de la Fundación de Loreto. The foundation of the city is celebrated from October 19 to 25. It's one of the most important cultural events in the state.
- Fiestas de San Javier. The festivities from December 1 to 3 are in honor of Saint Francis Xavier, patron saint from the neighbor town of San Javier. These festivities attract a lot of pilgrims from the peninsula.
- Loreto 400. An off-road racing event that takes place in September. The course is a classic desert offroad race which route includes Comondú, San Javier and the old towns of La Giganta mountain range.
- Loreto 300 milles. Off-road racing event. December.
- Torneo de las Mision Fishing Charity Tournament that started in 1993. The 2007 edition will be July 12–14.
- Loreto Dorado International Fishing Tournament. Takes place in July.
- Copa Dorado Tournament. State tournament in September.
- Governor's Cup Fishing Tournament. May.

=== Recreation ===
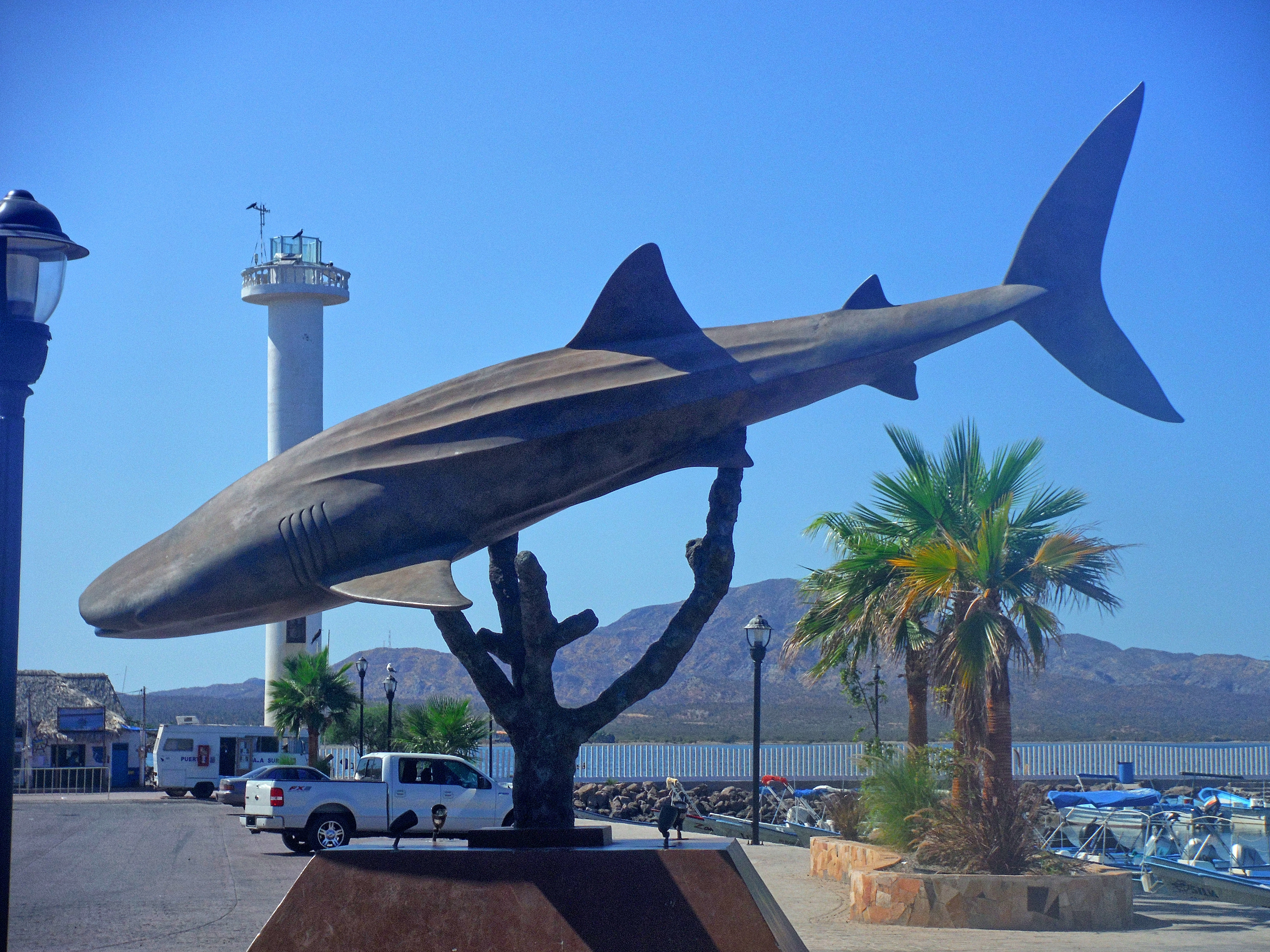
Public art on the Malecón de Loreto.

Fishing

Loreto has a reputation as an excellent sport fishing location. This is its main tourist attraction, as well as the main source of employment in the area, thus linking Loreto's economy closely to fishing. There are two well-defined fishing seasons: summer features "dorado" and species like marlin (black marlin, Atlantic blue marlin, striped marlin) and sailfish, which are ideal for fly fishing; winter fishing features "yellow tail" (jurel) and other species that usually are deep in the sea rocks. In addition to these seasonal species, Loreto's waters are home to other species like snapper and seabass, which are found all year long. Thanks to this abundance, Loreto has been home of several IGFA records. The two "foundations" of Loreto's sport fishing are the "dorado" and the "yellow tail" (Seriola lalandi dorsalis). The dorado is the emblematic species of Loreto's warm waters, its season beginning in late May, peaking from July to September, and ending in November, with two important tournaments, in July and September. The yellow tail is one of the strongest species; its season begins in November, peaks from March to April, and comes to an end in late May.

== Government ==
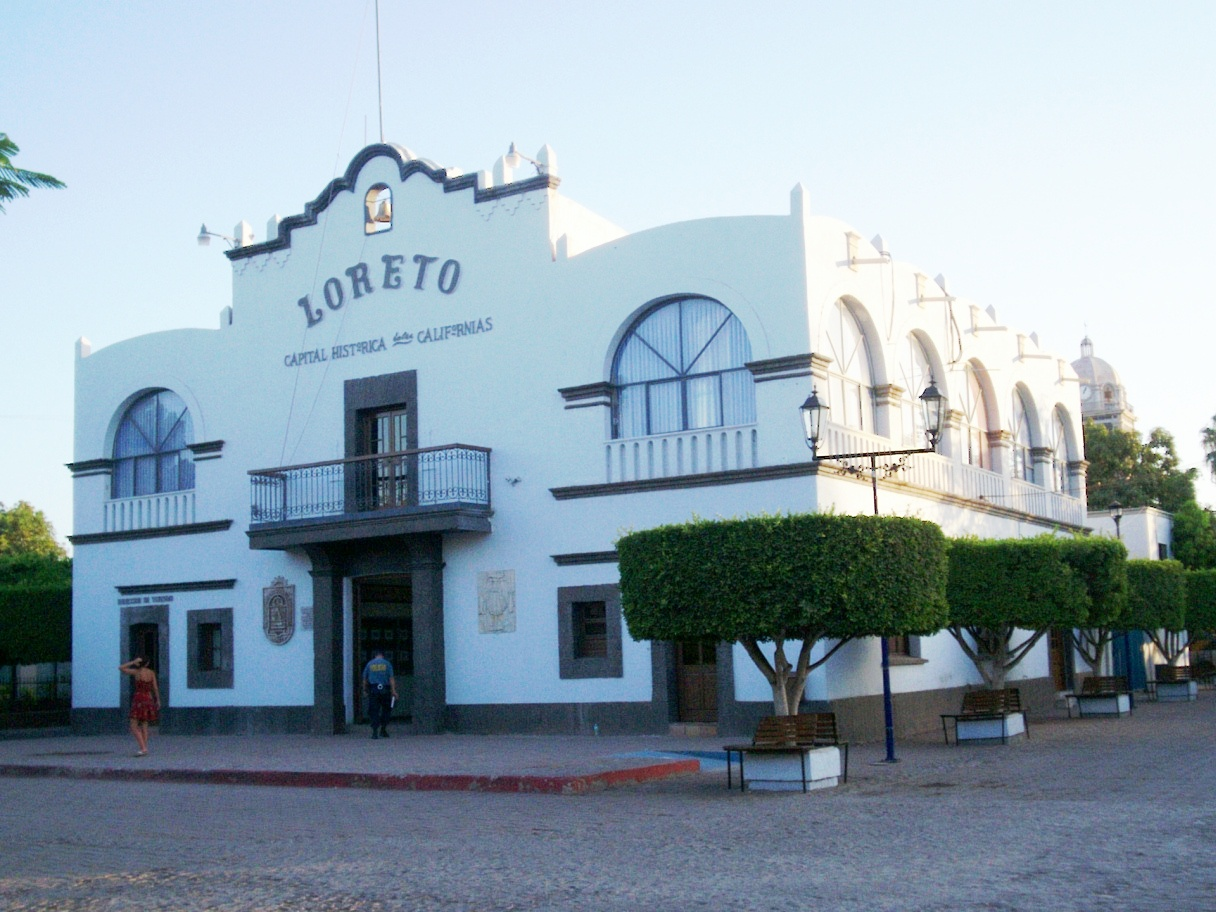
Seat of Loreto Municipality.

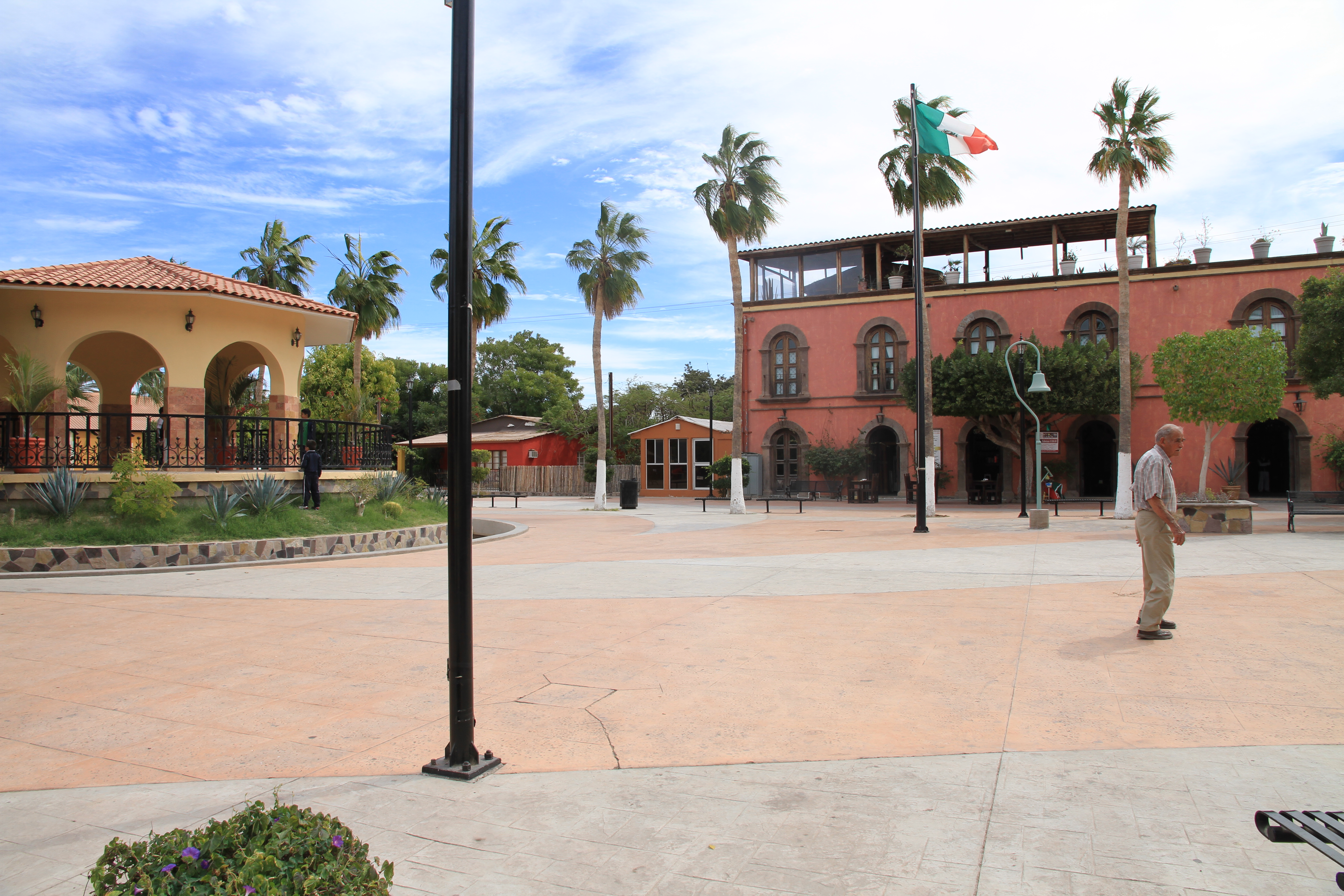
The Plaza Cívica de Loreto.

The city of Loreto is the seat of the Municipality of Loreto, which is governed by a City Council (Ayuntamiento), consisting of a Mayor or Municipal President (Presidente Municipal), a Syndic (Síndico), and six City Councilors (Regidores), all eight elected by direct popular vote for a mandatory single term limit of three years. The Mayor is a voting member of the council, and as head of the public municipal administration is directly responsible for actual implementation of the City Council's decisions, somewhat analogous to a City Manager. The Mayor of Loreto is Darryn Murphy, whose term runs until April 2021.

The Syndic (or Trustee), also a voting member, is responsible for the legal representation of both the council itself and of the municipal government more generally, and monitors municipal assets and supervises public servants conduct, similar to a US Inspector General.

The other six City Councilors are voting members whose principal function is analysis and overall direction, rather than direct implementation of the council's decisions. The Mayor is represented at the community action level by seven subdelegates (Subdelegados Municipales), who are appointed by the City Council to perform certain functions: presently serving are Agua Verde, San Javier, Ligüi, Colonia Zaragoza, San Nicolás, Tembabiche, and San Juan.

Mayors of Loreto
Years	Name	Political Party
2014–2018	Prof. Arely Arce Peralta	PAN
2011–2014	Jorge Alberto Avilés Pérez	PRI
2008–2011	Prof. Yuan Yee Cunningham	PRD
2005–2008	Rosalía Romero de Aguiar (2007–2008); Rodolfo Davis Osuna (2005–2007)	PAN
2002–2005	Lic. Homero Davis Castro	PAN
1999–2002	Lic. Antonio Verdugo Davis	PRI
1996–1999	Ramón Davis Drew	PRI
1993–1996	Alfredo García Green	PAN

== Education ==
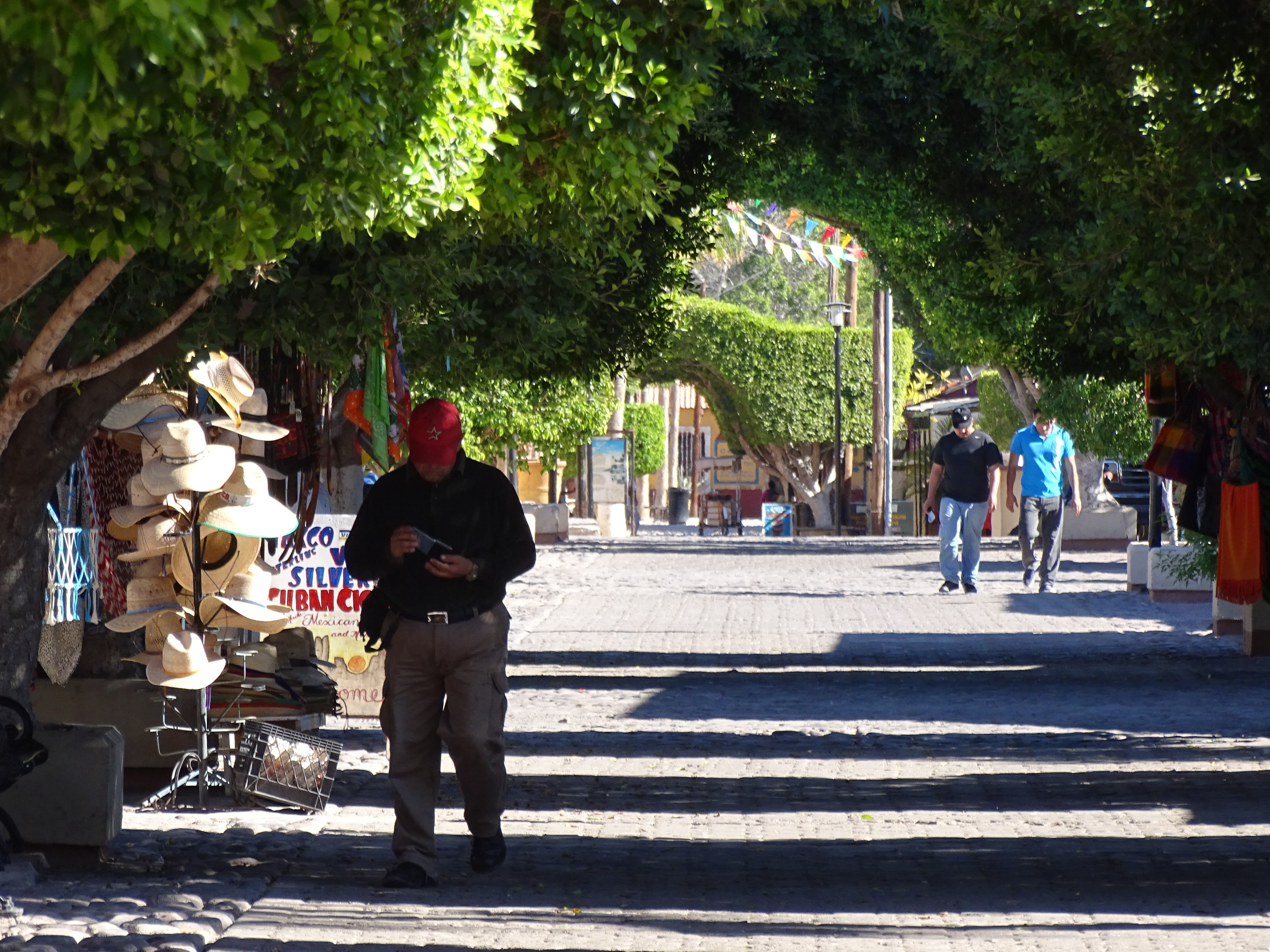
Tree-covered walkways in downtown

The city has two public schools of superior studies:

- The Regional Center of Normal Education "Marcelo Rubio Ruiz" (CREN) is an undergraduate school of education that offers two bachelor's degree programs in education and in special education.
- The Autonomous University of Baja California Sur (UABCS) Loreto campus offers two bachelor's degree programs in alternative tourism and in political science and public administration.

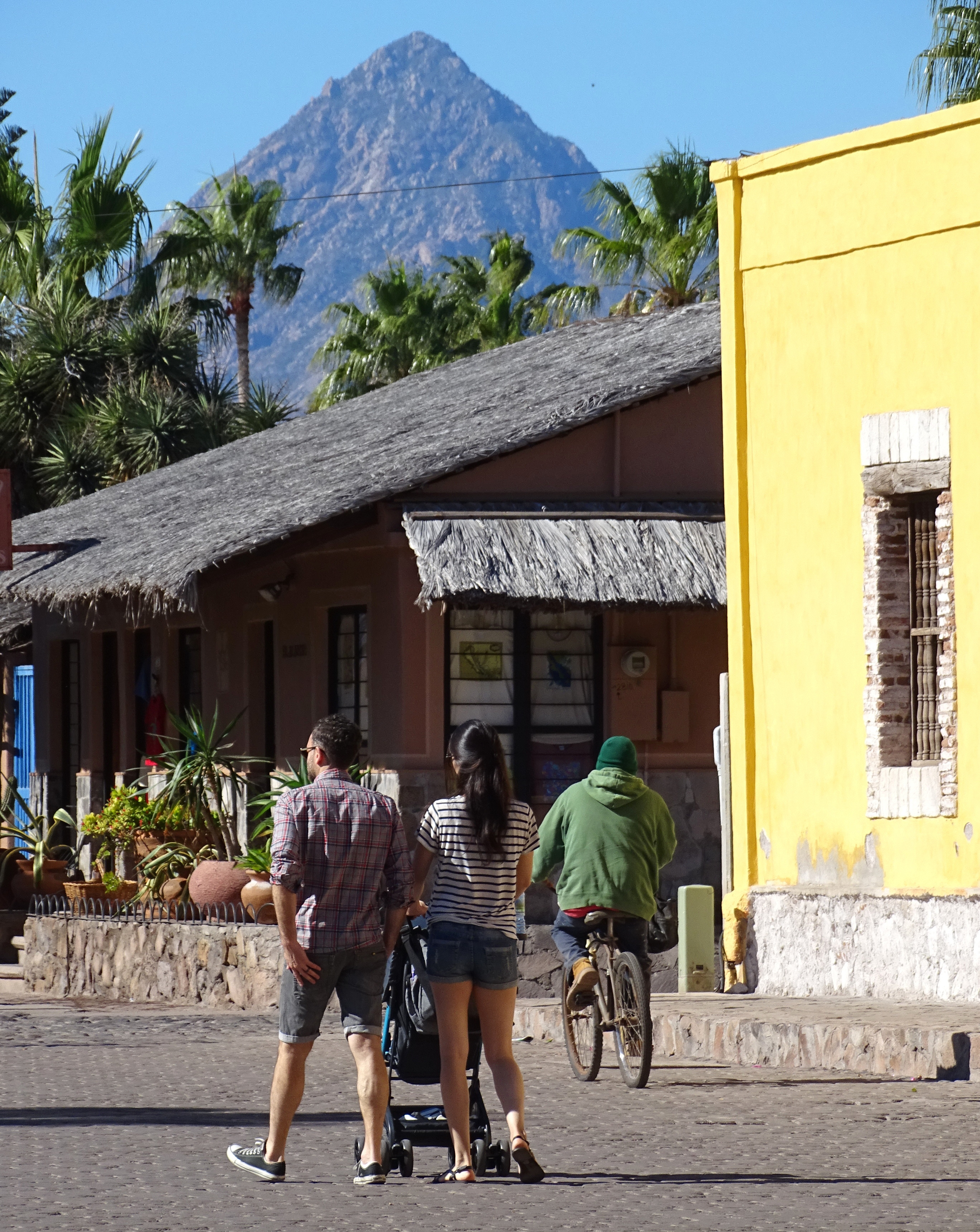
View of Sierra de la Giganta from Loreto.

The Catholic private school Colegio Calafia offers one associate degree in commerce

High school students (10th to 12th grade) are served by two public schools:

- Centro de Estudios de Bachillerato
- Colegio de Bachilleres (former Preparatoria Federal por Cooperación "Manuel Davis Ramírez")

Middle school students (7th to 9th grade) are served by two public schools:

- Escuela Secundaria Estatal "Benito Juárez"
- Escuela Secundaria Estatal "Modesto Sánchez Mayón"

Elementary school students (1st to 6th grade) are served by six public schools and one catholic private school. There are five kindergarten schools. Boarding School Number 8 (Albergue Escolar Número 8 "General Venustiano Carranza") serves children from the mountain villages who attend school, away from their homes and families. It serves approximately sixty five students.

== Transport ==
The city is served by Loreto International Airport, offering domestic flights on carriers Volaris and Calafia. It is also one of the few places to get aviation fuel in the Baja area. International service is currently provided by Alaska Airlines and Horizon Air to Los Angeles. Beginning in 2015, WestJet has also offered seasonal weekly direct flights to Calgary. American Airlines has announced seasonal service to both Phoenix PHX and Dallas Ft. Worth DFW starting in 2021
