= Territorial evolution of Mexico =

Territorial evolution of Mexico from 4 October 1824 to 8 October 1974

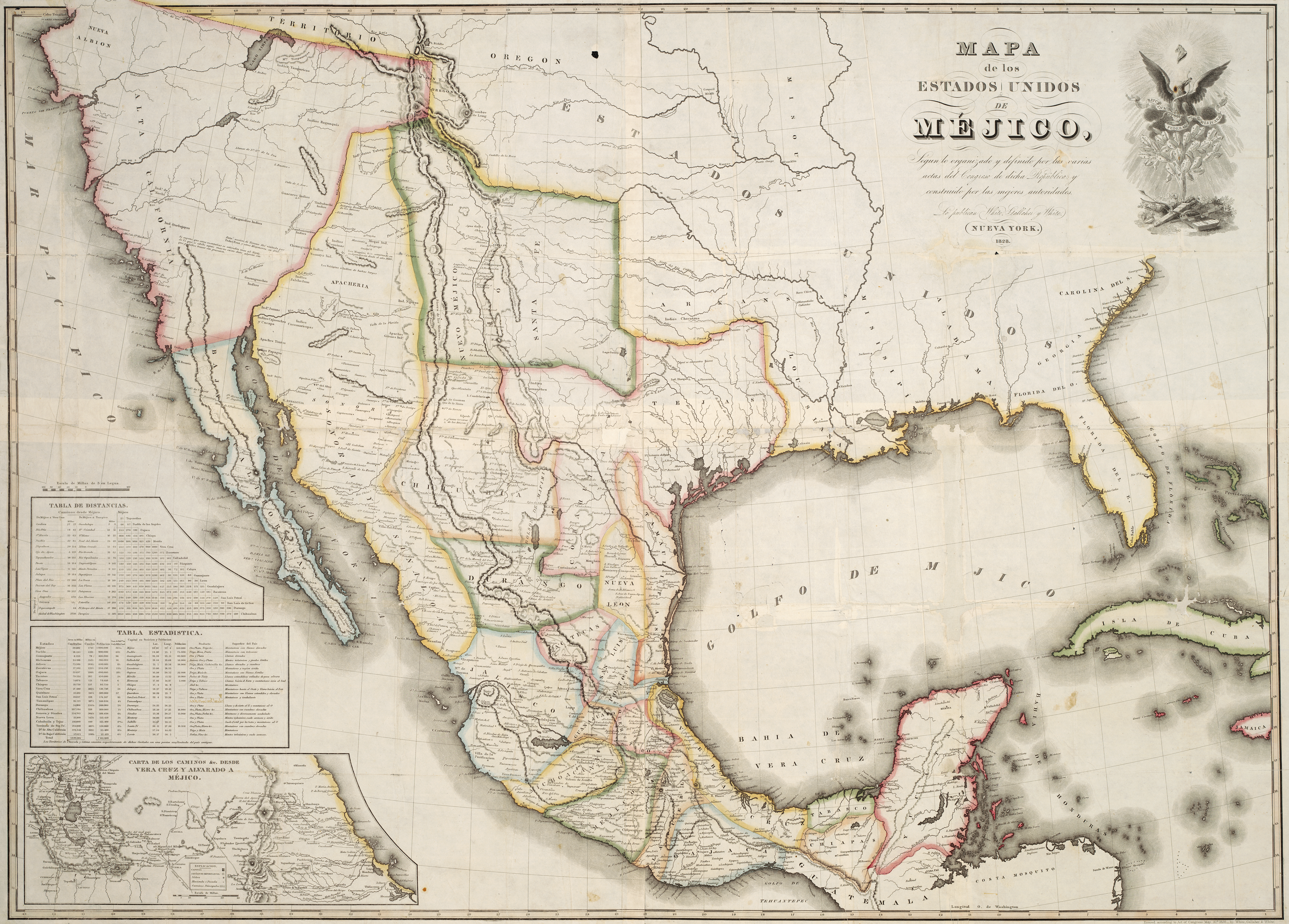
Map of Mexico in 1828

Mexico has experienced many changes in territorial organization during its history as an independent state. The territorial boundaries of Mexico were affected by presidential and imperial decrees. One such decree was the Law of Bases for the Convocation of the Constituent Congress to the Constitutive Act of the Mexican Federation, which determined the national land area as the result of integration of the jurisdictions that corresponded to New Spain, the Captaincy General of Yucatán, the Captaincy General of Guatemala and the autonomous Kingdoms of East and West. The decree resulted in the independence from Spain.

== Organizations ==
=== Subdivision by intendancies ===
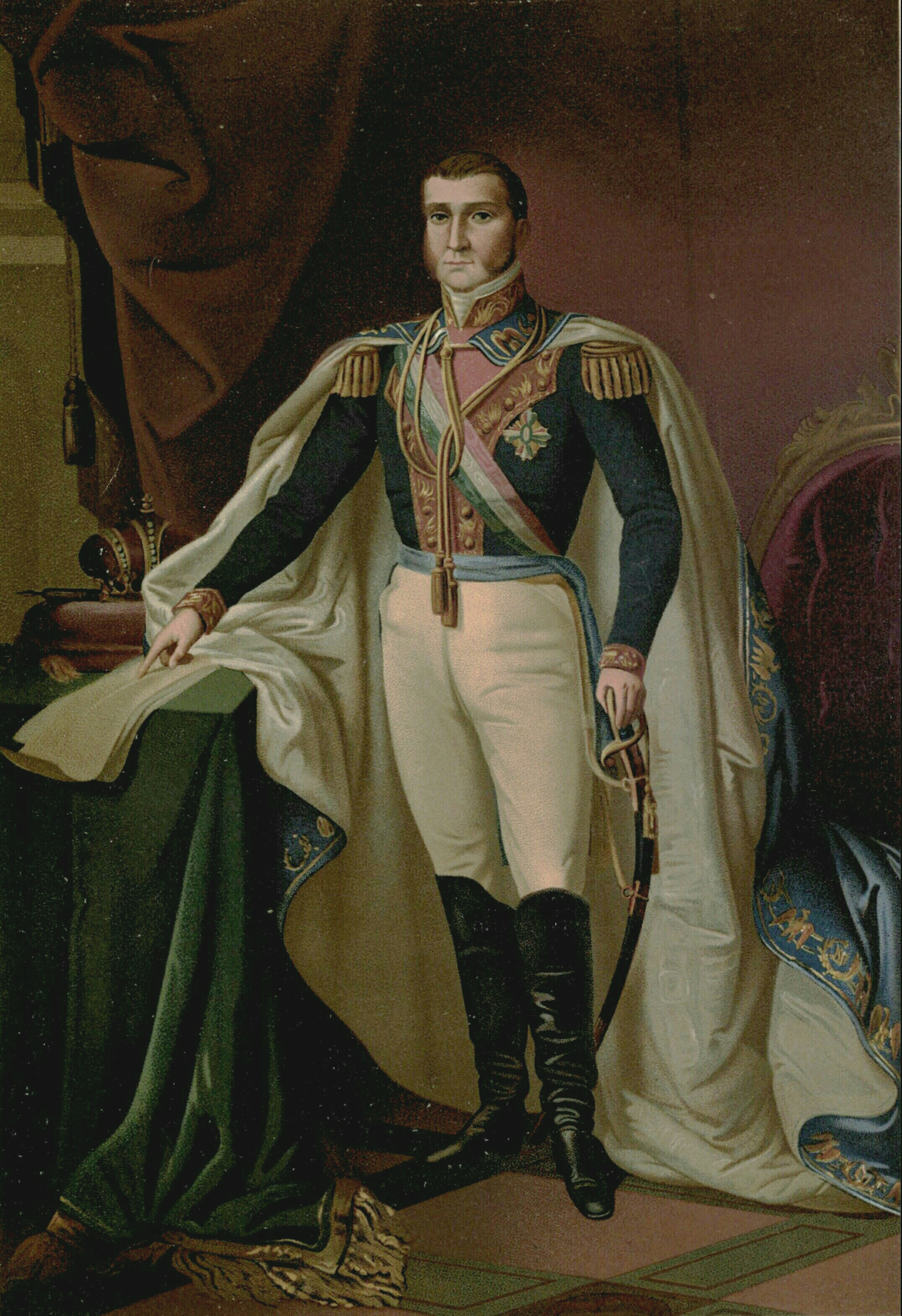
Agustín de Iturbide, first Emperor of Mexico.

During the period of the Independence of Mexico, part of the territorial organization of New Spain was integrated into the new nation of the Mexican Empire. Added to this were the Captaincy General of Yucatán and the Captaincy General of Guatemala (whose annexation was a strategy to counteract the Spanish crown). This yielded Mexico's largest land area as an independent nation.

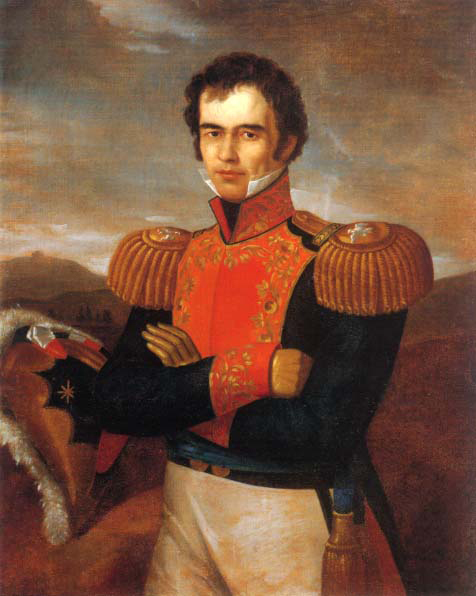
Guadalupe Victoria, First President of México.

=== Subdivision by state and territory ===
During the structuring of the Republic, territorial and legal changes reaffirmed the Catholic Church's status as the only religion for Mexicans. The new nation developed a popular and representative federal republic that recognized the sovereignty of the States constituting the federal union.

=== Subdivision by department ===
The liberal government of Antonio López de Santa Anna, influenced by conservatives, ratified the Seven Laws by presidential decree, establishing a new territorial court and replacing the federal states by departments whose governors and legislators would be selected by the President. This break from federalism brought Mexico its most turbulent and unstable era.

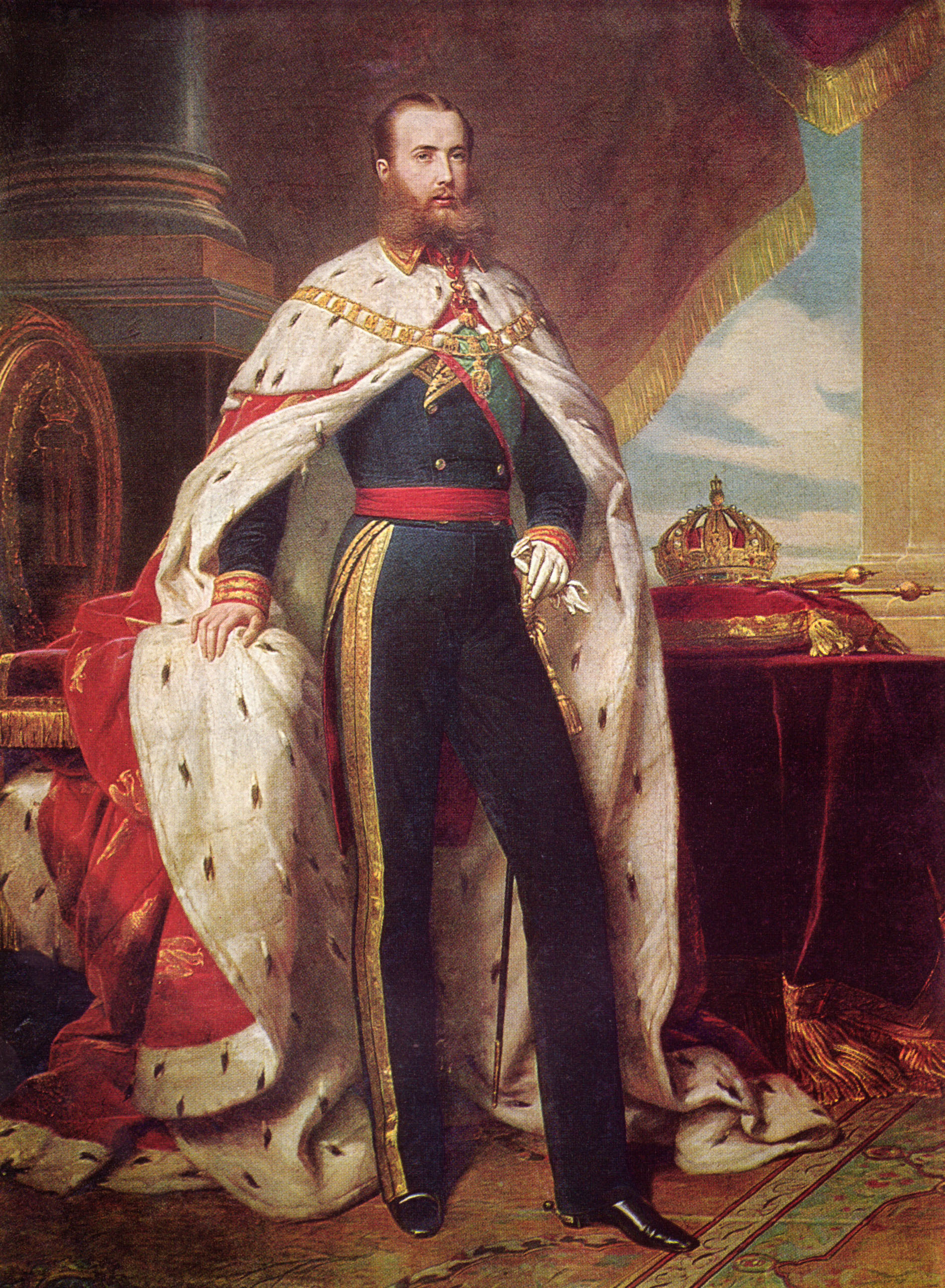
Maximilian I, Last Emperor of Mexico.

During the Second Mexican Empire, Emperor Maximilian I of Mexico made a new division of national territory.

Territorial divisions throughout Mexican history were generally linked to political change and programs aimed at improving the country's economic and social development. On 3 March 1865, one of the most important decrees of the government of Maximilian, the first division of the territory of the new Empire, was issued and published in the Journal of the Empire on 13 March. The reorganization was accomplished by Manuel Orozco y Berra (1816–1881) and was made according to the following rules:

- The total land area of the country will be divided into at least fifty departments.
- Whenever possible, natural features will be used for boundaries.
- The surface area of each department will take into account the terrain, weather, and all elements of production, so that (eventually) the departments will hold an equal number of inhabitants.

This division was of great importance because geographical features and projected development were taken into account for the delimitation of the jurisdictions. The territorial division of the Second Mexican Empire was used for a short period because the Empire was overthrown in early 1867 with the execution of Maximilian I. The Federal Republic, and its former divisions, were restored in that year.

=== Clarifications ===
Several of the former borders of the states and territories in northern Mexico remain unclear. The northern border of Sonora, for example, is described in various ways, either as the Gila River or the Colorado River. The list of acts is not affected by this confusion, but the associated maps contain the following uncertainties and omissions:

- The territorial extent of the Santa Fe de Nuevo México Territory
- The exact date that the division between Durango and Chihuahua stopped being a straight line
- Several minor adjustments to the border with the United States, including the Chamizal dispute, are not specified
- The Republic of Baja California and Republic of Sonora – proclaimed by the American William Walker in 1854, were never more than a declaration and are not shown on maps.
- The following maps do not show the separation of Zacatecas (in 1835) and Tabasco (in 1841–1842), which never became independent republics and were never proclaimed as such.
- The maps do not show the claim of Mexico on part of the former British Honduras, presently known as Belize.

== Territorial evolution of Mexico ==
=== Timeline ===
==== 1821–1824 ====
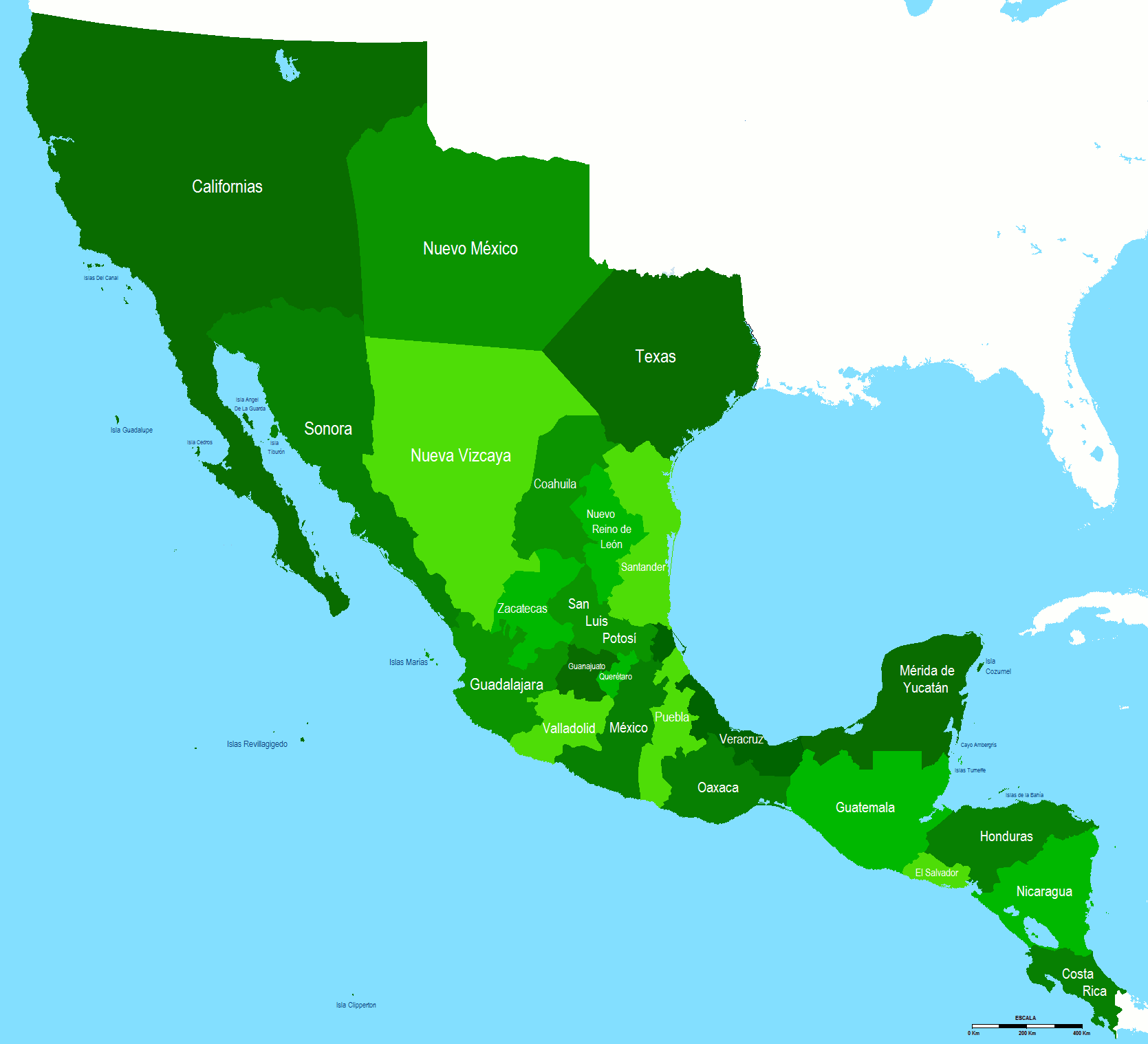
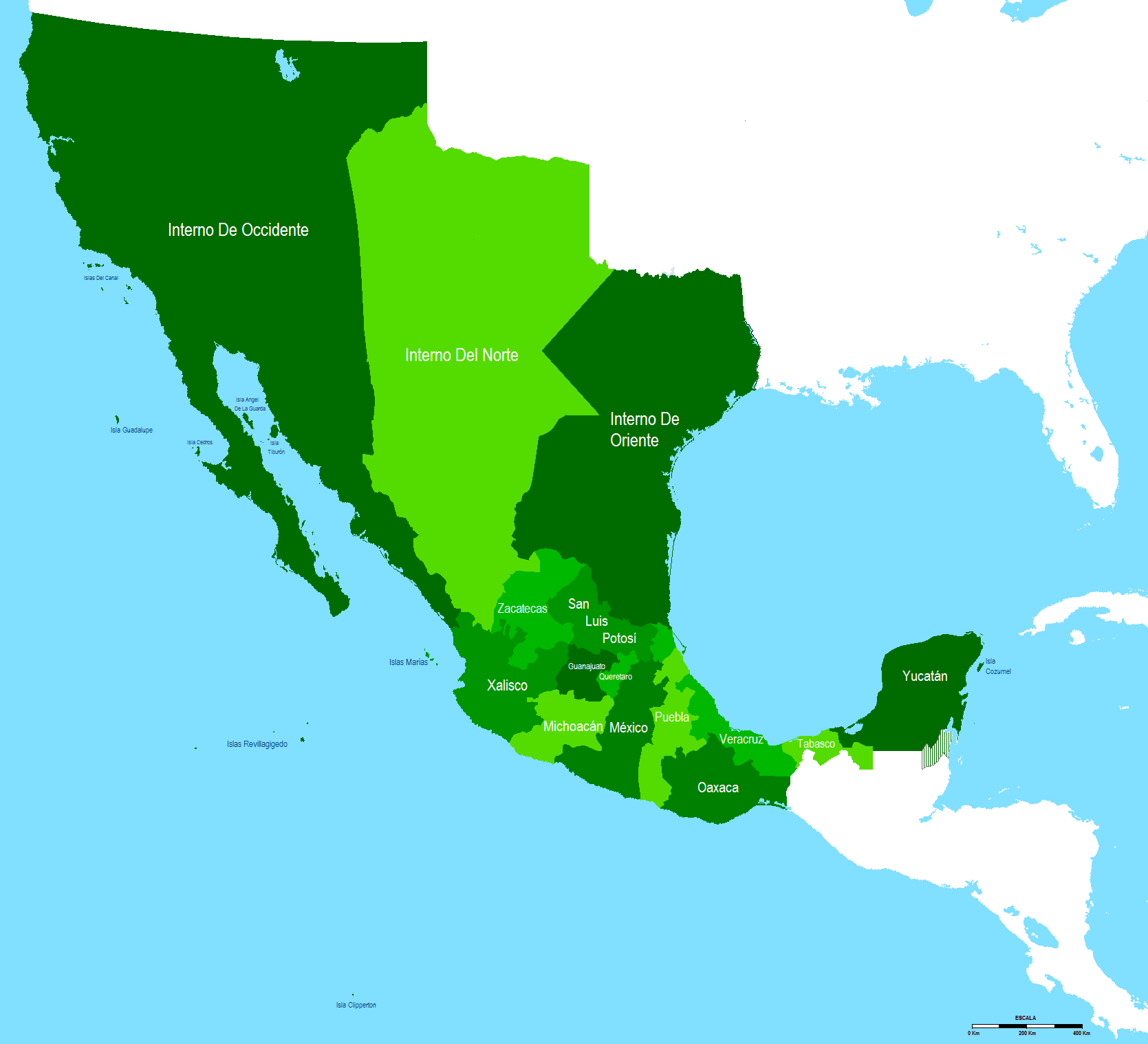
From Independence to the Constitution of 1824
Map	Date	Description
	September 28, 1821	The 24 intendencies of the First Mexican Empire were: Las Californias; México; Nuevo México; Texas; Nueva Vizcaya; Coahuila; Nuevo Reino de León; Nuevo Santander; Sonora; Zacatecas; San Luis Potosí; Guanajuato; Querétaro; Puebla; Guadalajara; Oaxaca; Mérida de Yucatán; Valladolid; Veracruz; Guatemala; El Salvador; Honduras; Nicaragua; Costa Rica
	May 21, 1823	Territorial organization under the interim government of Mexico after the establishment of the Republic on May 21, 1823, and before the decree of the Constitutive Act of the Mexican Federation on January 31, 1824 – the period between the end of the First Mexican Empire and the creation of the Federal Republic of the United Mexican States. After the end of the empire, the Central American provinces decided not to be part of Mexico. Chiapas (part of Guatemala) was not yet part of Mexico, while the region of Soconusco proclaimed its independence from Mexico on 24 July 1824, and was formally annexed by the Federal Republic of Central America on August 18, 1824.

==== 1824–1857 ====
From the Constitution of 1824 to the Constitution of 1857
Map
Date
Description

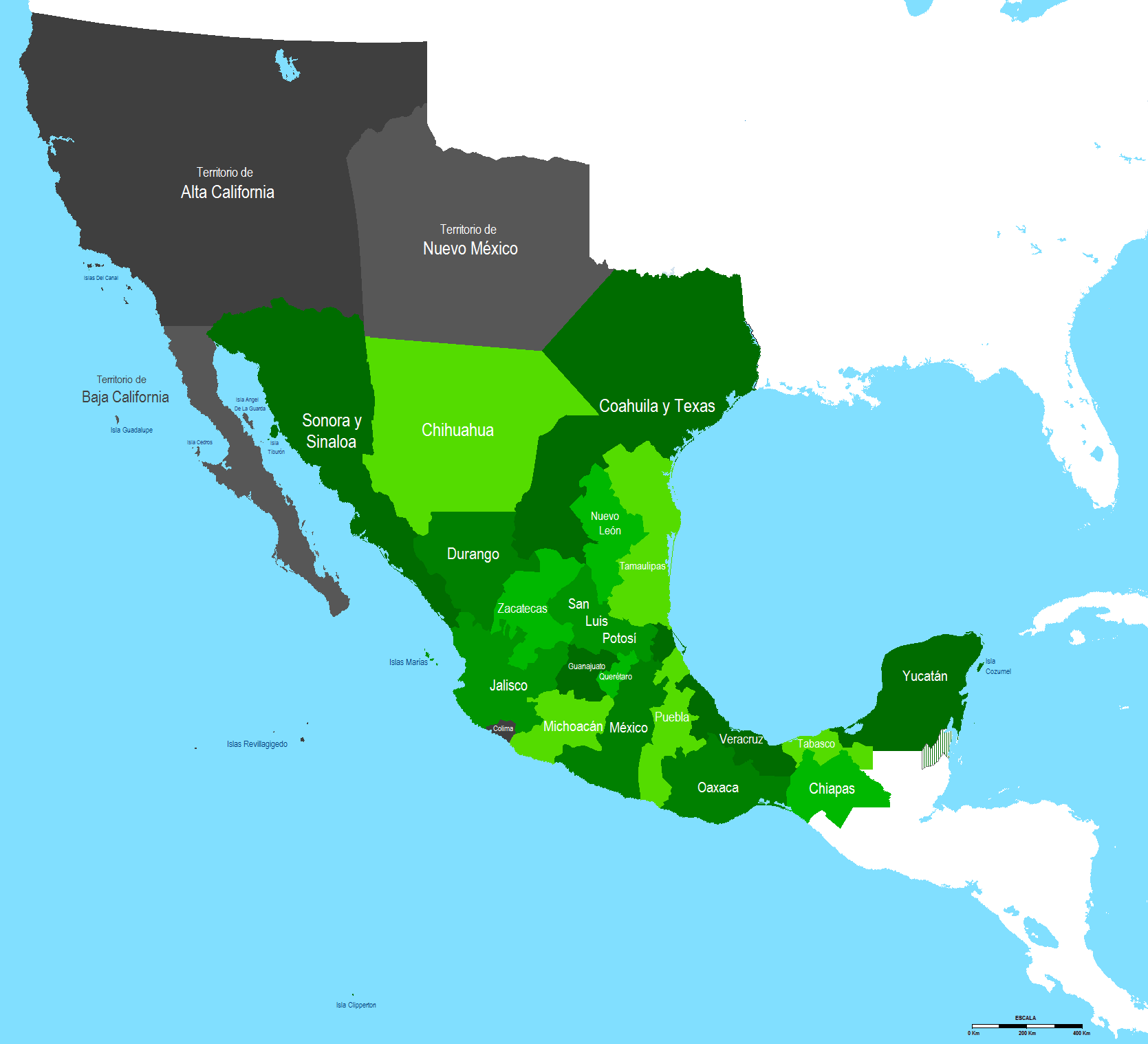

October 4, 1824
The Constitution of 1824 officially established the United Mexican States.

The Constitution organized the country into 19 states and four territories. The order of the states is determined by the date of accession to the federation, listed in the order in which the constitutional congress of the state was established. The 19 founding states were:

Order	Name	Date of Admission to Federation	Installation date of the Congress
1	México	1823-12-20	02-03-1824
2	Guanajuato	1823-12-20	25-03-1825
3	Oaxaca	1823-12-21	01-07-1823
4	Puebla	1823-12-21	19-03-1824
5	Michoacán	1823-12-22	06-04-1824
6	San Luis Potosí	1823-12-22	21-04-1824
7	Veracruz	1823-12-22	09-05-1824
8	Yucatán	1823-12-23	20-08-1823
9	Jalisco	1823-12-23	14-09-1823
10	Zacatecas	1823-12-23	19-10-1823
11	Querétaro	1823-12-23	17-02-1824
12	Sonora y Sinaloa	1824-01-10	12-09-1824
13	Tabasco	1824-02-07	03-05-1824
14	Tamaulipas	1824-02-07	07-05-1824
15	Nuevo León	1824-05-07	01-08-1824
16	Coahuila y Texas	1824-05-07	15-08-1824
17	Durango	1824-05-22	08-09-1824
18	Chihuahua	1824-07-06	08-09-1824
19	Chiapas	1824-09-14	05-01-1825

The four federal territories were:

Alta California
Baja California Territory
Colima Territory
Nuevo México Territory

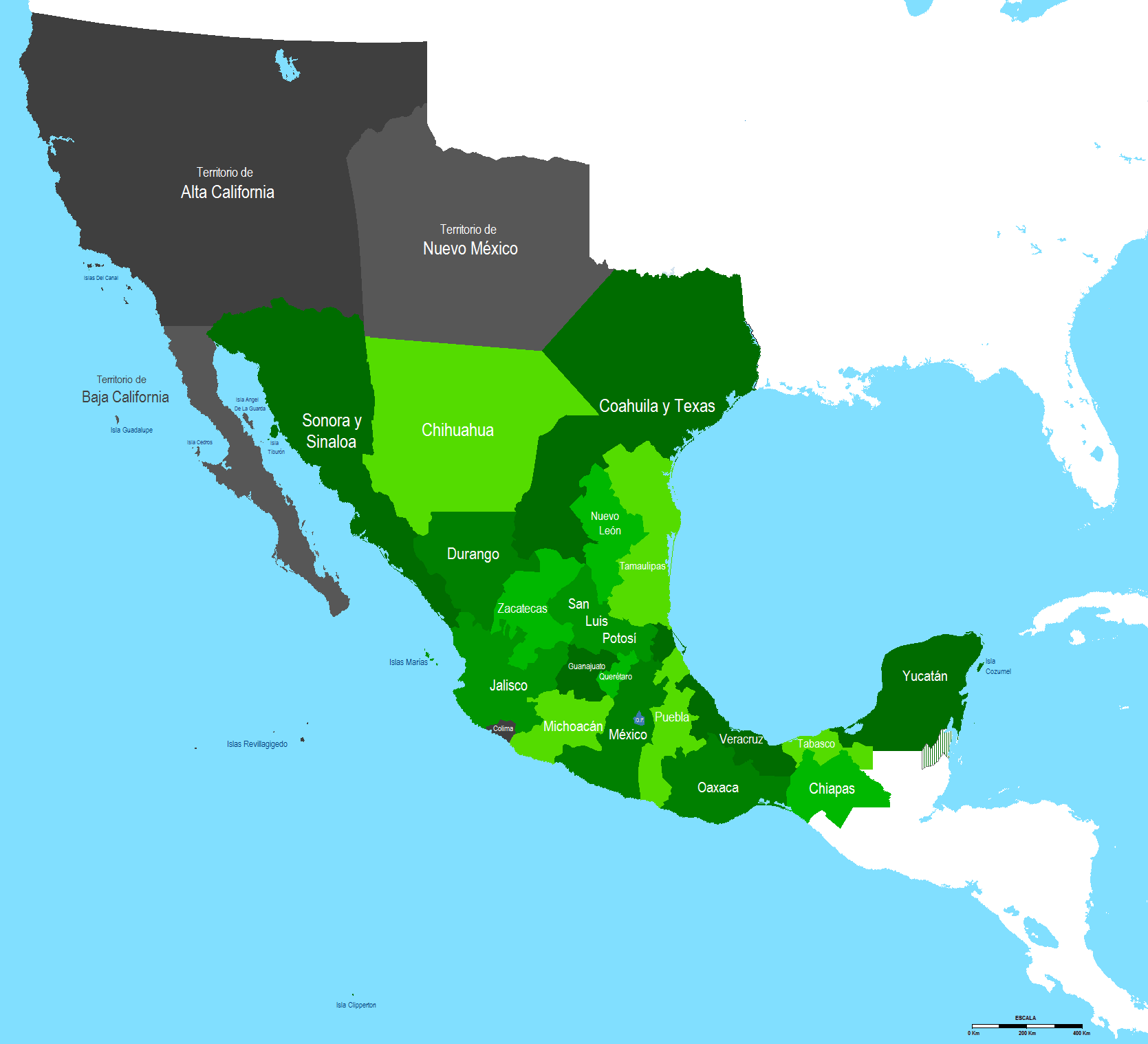

November 18, 1824
The Federal District was established around the City of Mexico, separating it from the State of Mexico. The Federal District was originally a perfect circle with an area of 220 square kilometres (85 sq mi), centered on the Zócalo (Constitution Square). In 1854, Antonio López de Santa Anna enlarged the Federal District's area to 1,700 square kilometres (660 sq mi), before it was reduced to the current 1,479 square kilometres (571 sq mi) between 1898 and 1902, during the rule of Porfirio Díaz. This map shows only the current area of the Federal District.

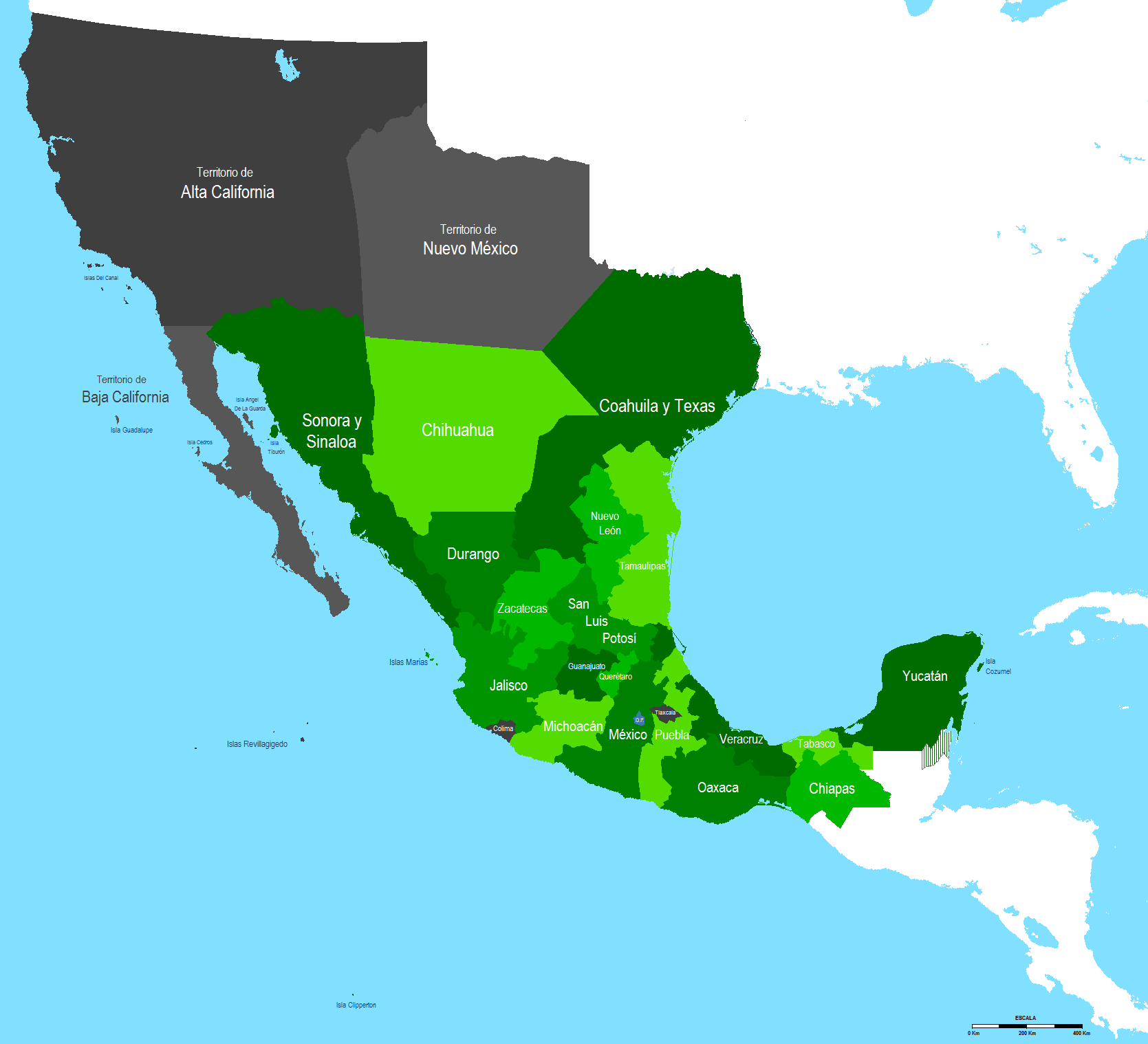

November 24, 1824
The Tlaxcala Territory was created out of part of the state of Puebla.

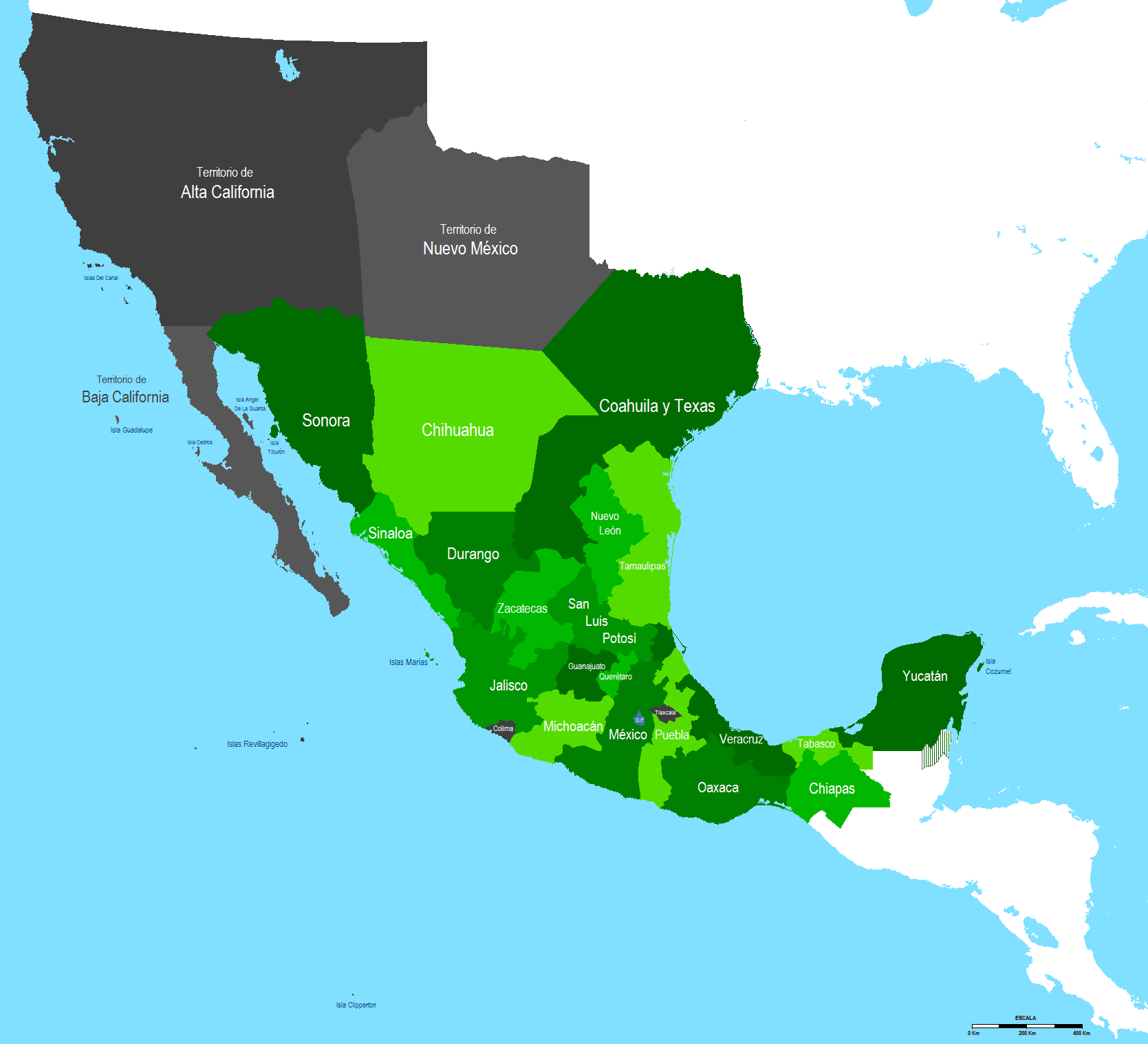

October 14, 1830
Sonora and Sinaloa became separate states.

Created as a state.

Order	Name	Date of Admission
20	Sinaloa	14-10-1830

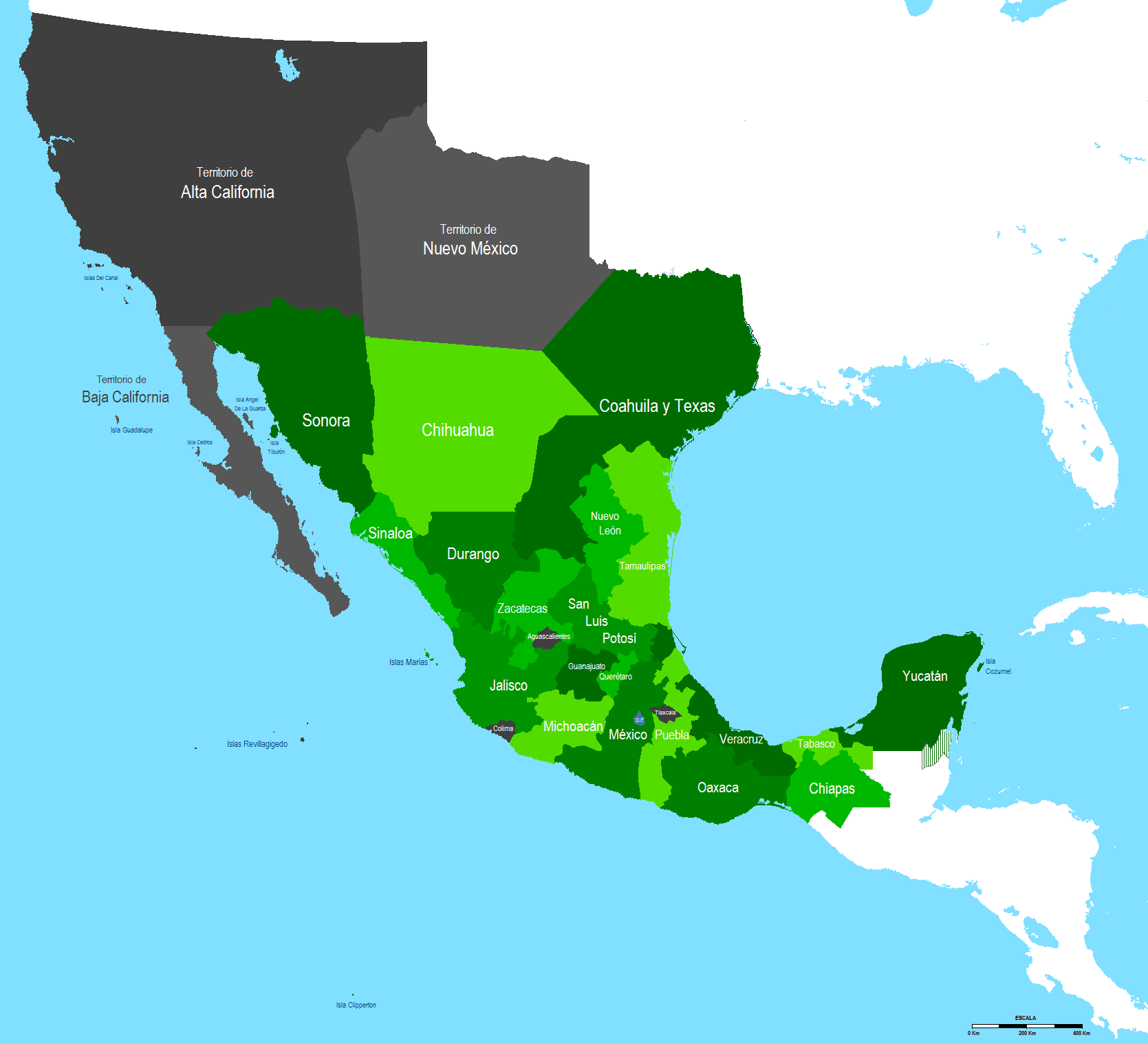

May 23, 1835
The Aguascalientes Territory was created out of part of the state of Zacatecas.

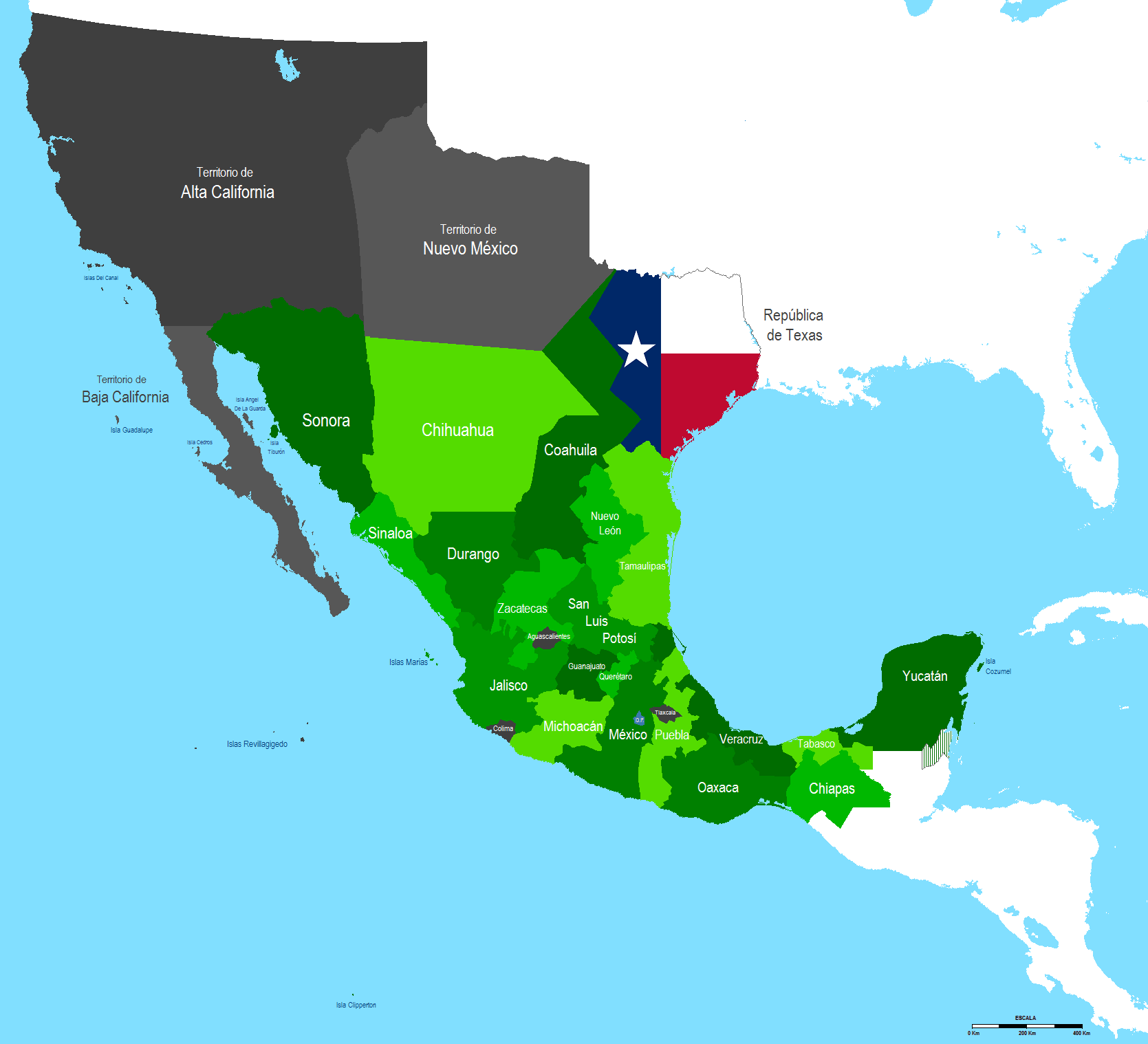

April 21, 1836
The region of Texas of the state of Coahuila y Texas declared its independence. The rest of the state was named Coahuila. The Treaties of Velasco ended the Texas Revolution on May 14, 1836, with the creation of the independent Republic of Texas.

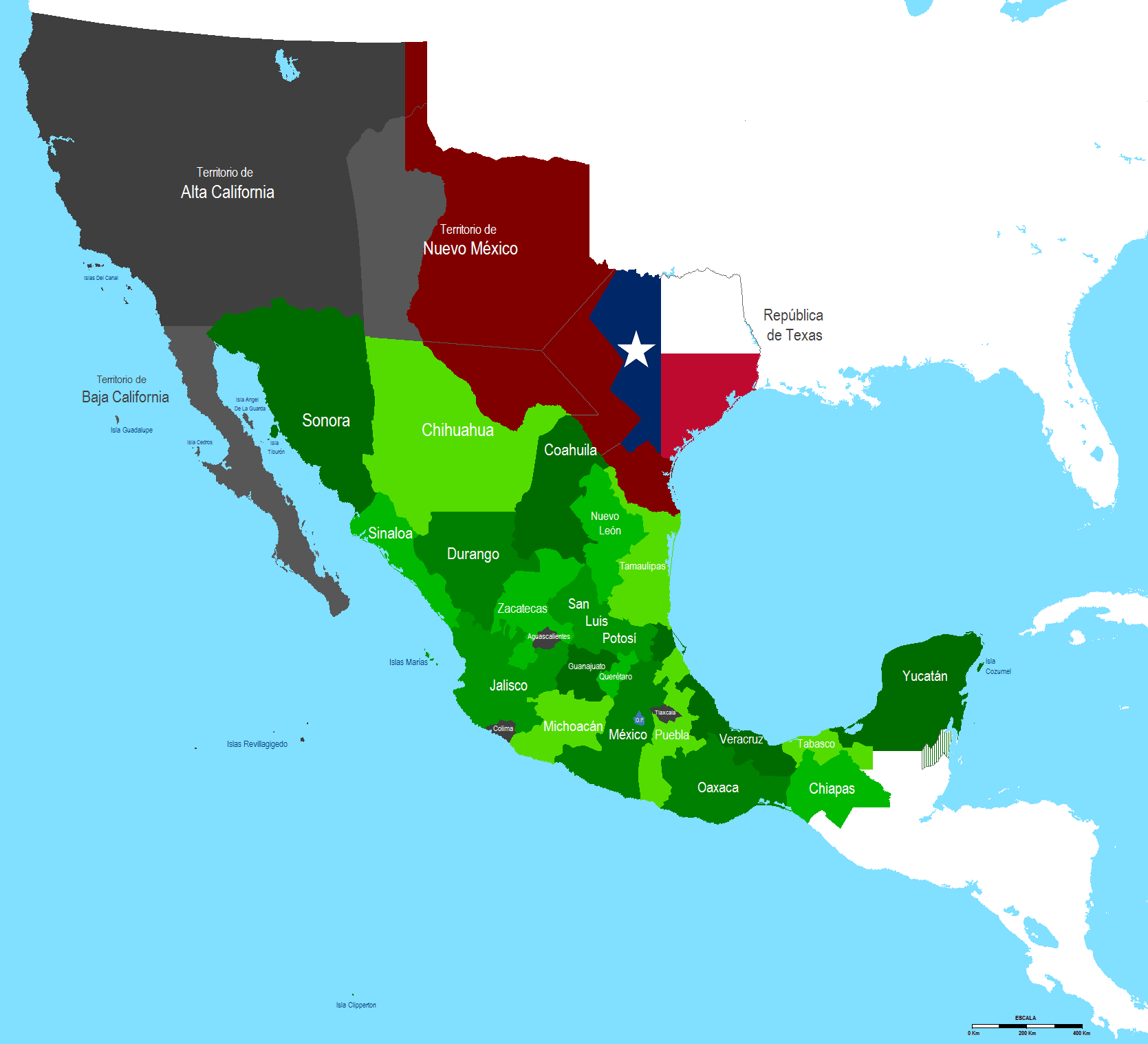

1837
Texas published a map claiming the Rio Grande as its border with Mexico and not the Nueces River, the border since the Spanish colonial era. The Mexican Congress rejected the Treaties of Velasco signed by Antonio López de Santa Anna, arguing that Santa Anna had no authority to grant independence to Texas.

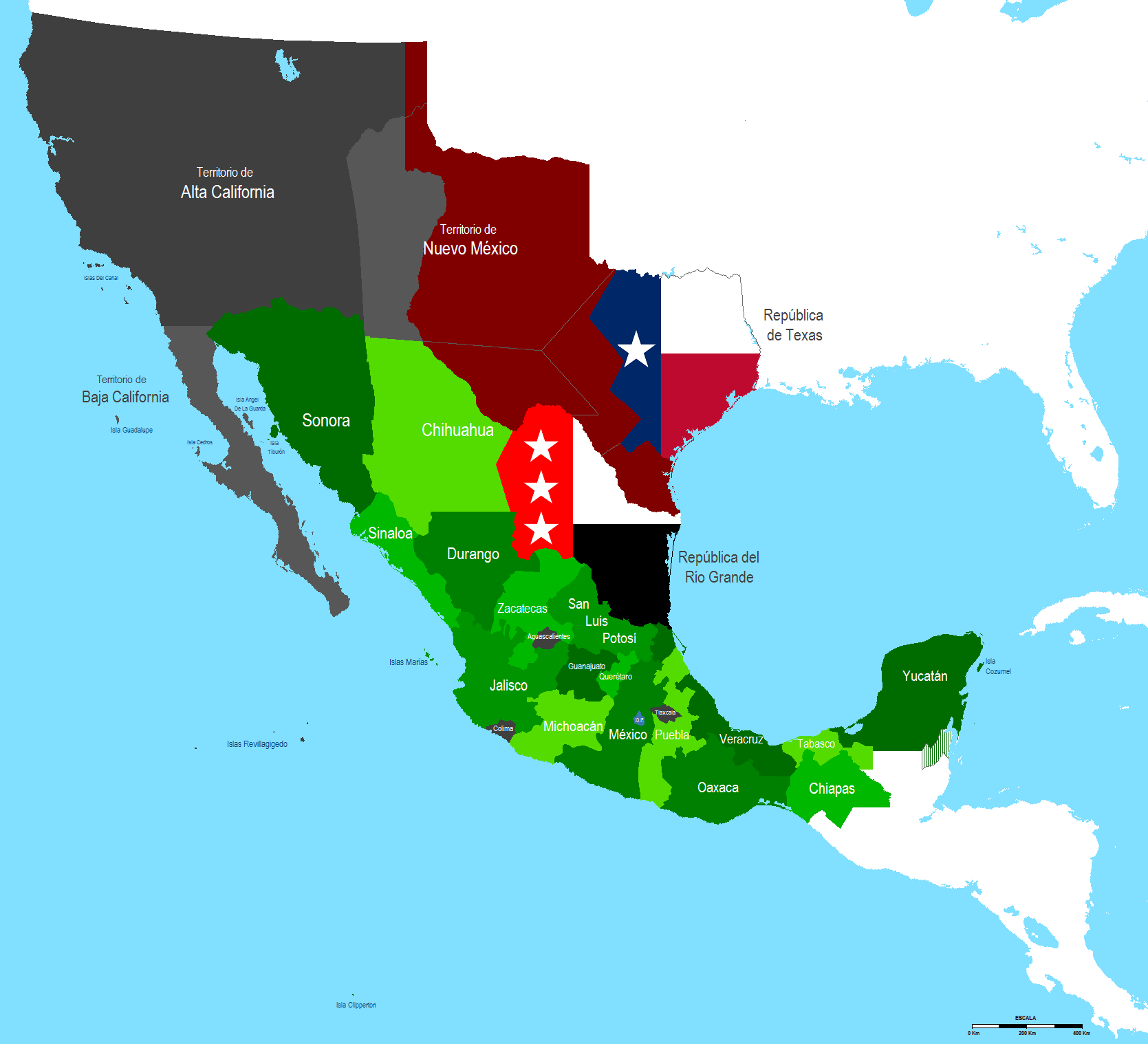

January 17, 1840
The states of Coahuila, Nuevo León and Tamaulipas declared their independence from Mexico as the Republic of the Rio Grande, which also took the eastern part of the state of Chihuahua. However, the border with Texas was never determined: the Republic claimed the Nueces River as its northern border, while Texas continued to claim the Rio Grande as its southern border.

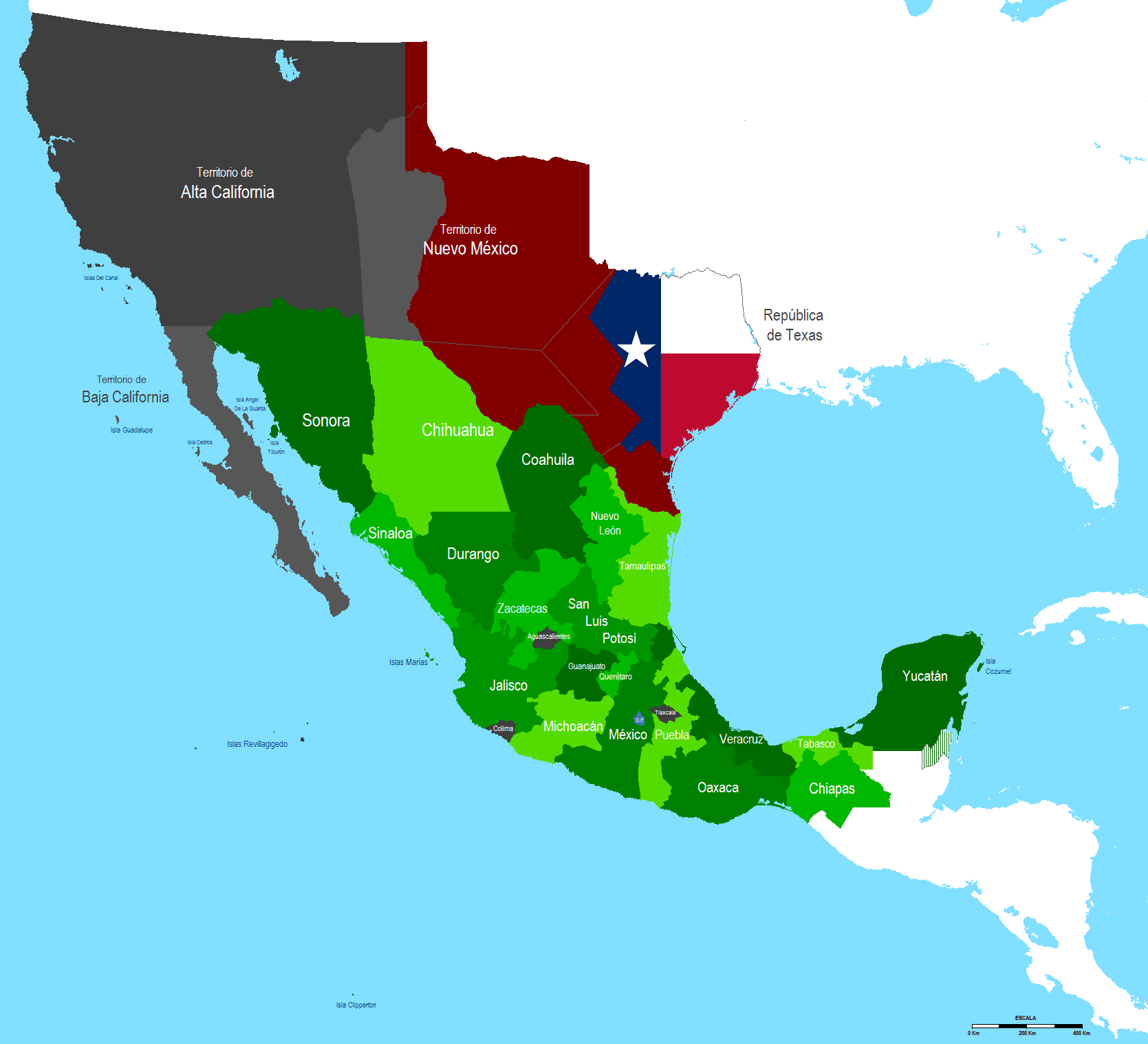

November 6, 1840
The Republic of the Rio Grande returned to Mexico after a brief and unsuccessful war for independence. Coahuila was allowed to keep the part of Chihuahua taken by the Republic as compensation for the loss of Texas.

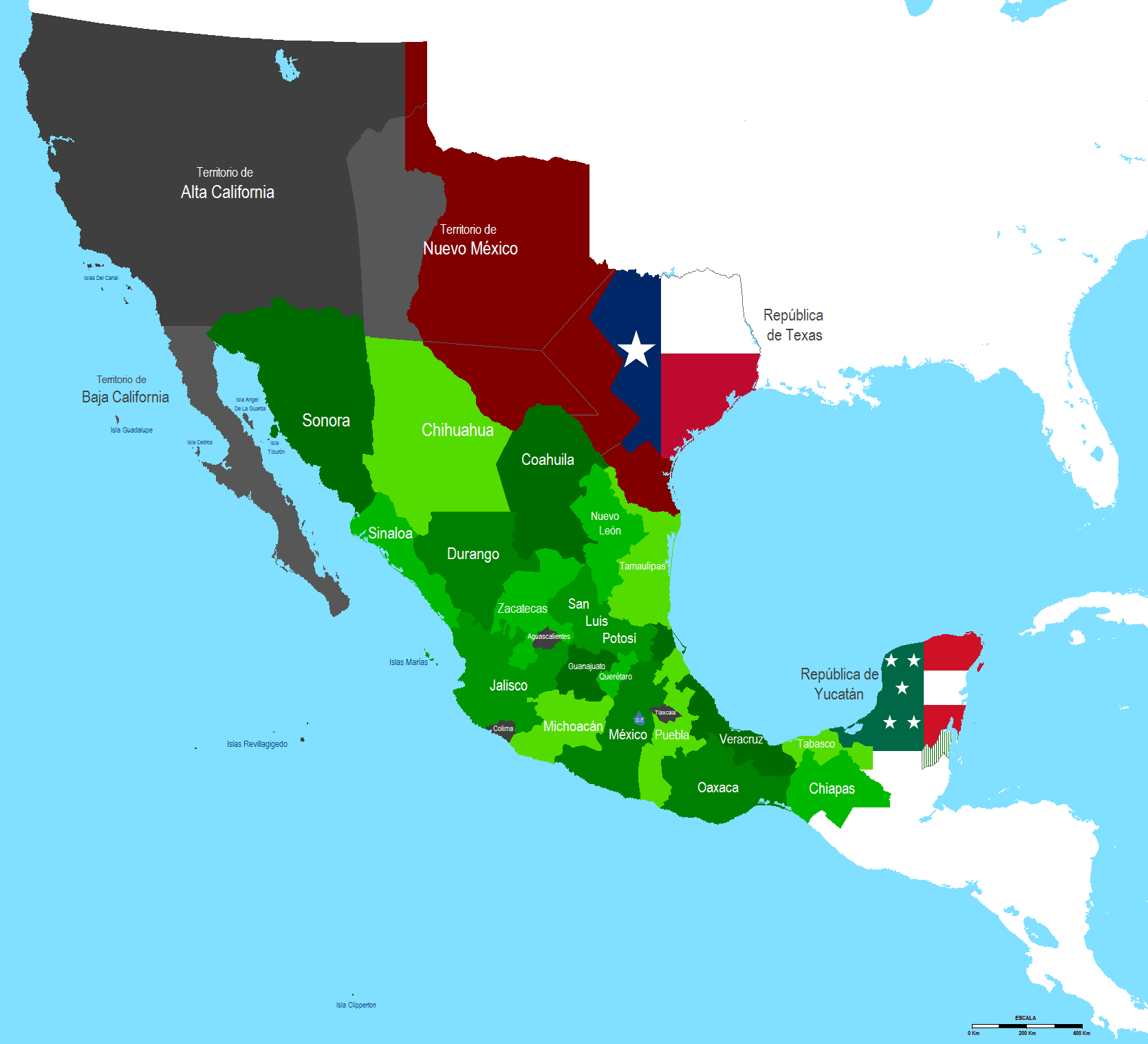

October 1, 1841
On February 12, 1840, Yucatán sent a report to the central government demanding the restoration of federalism as a form of government to combat poverty in the country. The act demanded the re-establishment of the Mexican Constitution of 1824. On October 1, 1841, the local Chamber of Deputies enacted the Declaration of Independence of the Yucatán Peninsula, thus establishing the second Republic of Yucatán.

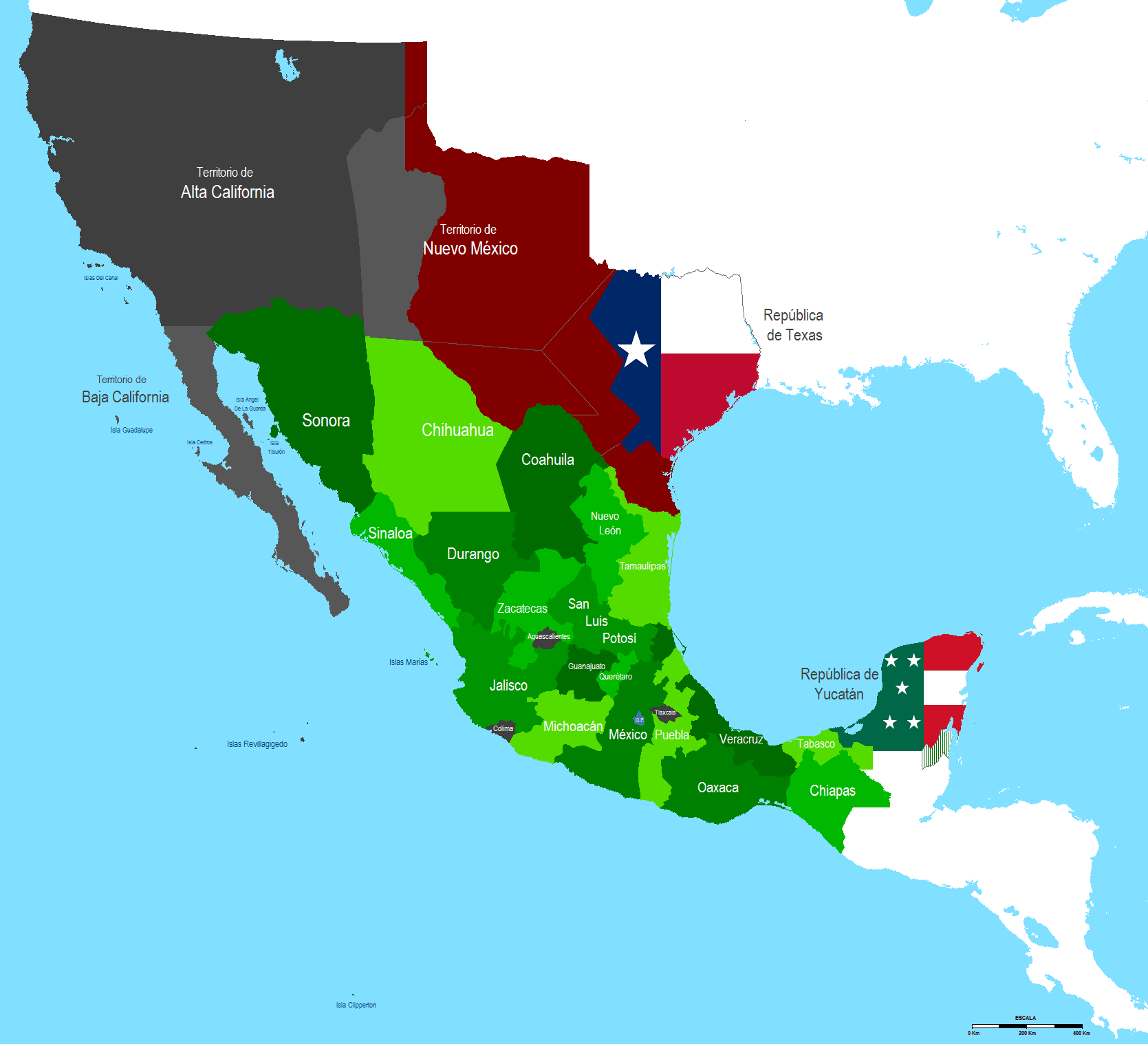

September 11, 1842
The region of Soconusco was annexed by Mexico as part of the state of Chiapas, following the dissolution of the Federal Republic of Central America.

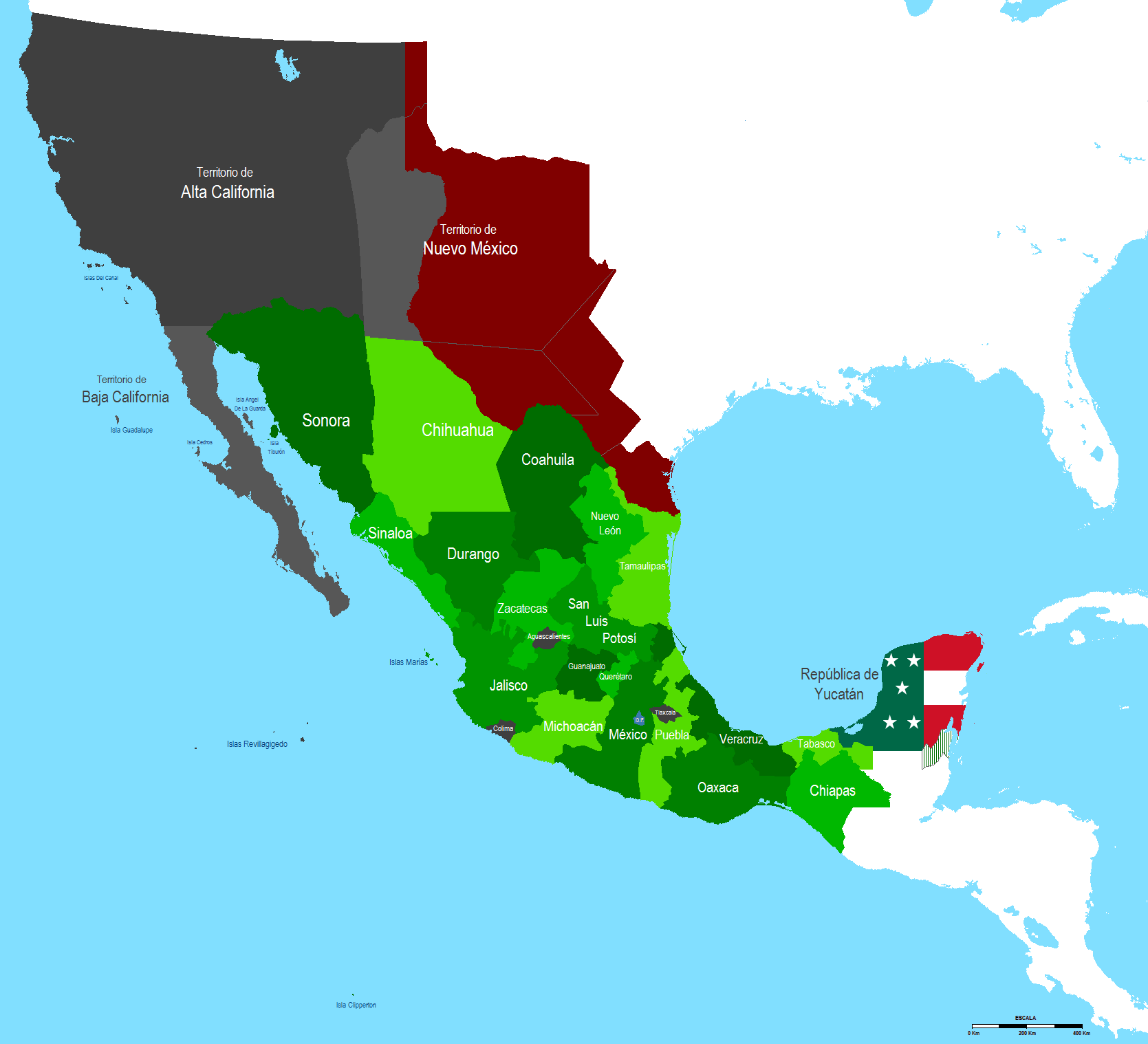

December 29, 1845
The U.S. annexed the Republic of Texas and admitted it to the Union as the State of Texas. Mexico did not accept the annexation, while also continuing to claim the Nueces River as its border with Texas. The dispute ultimately provoked the Mexican–American War, which began on April 25, 1846.

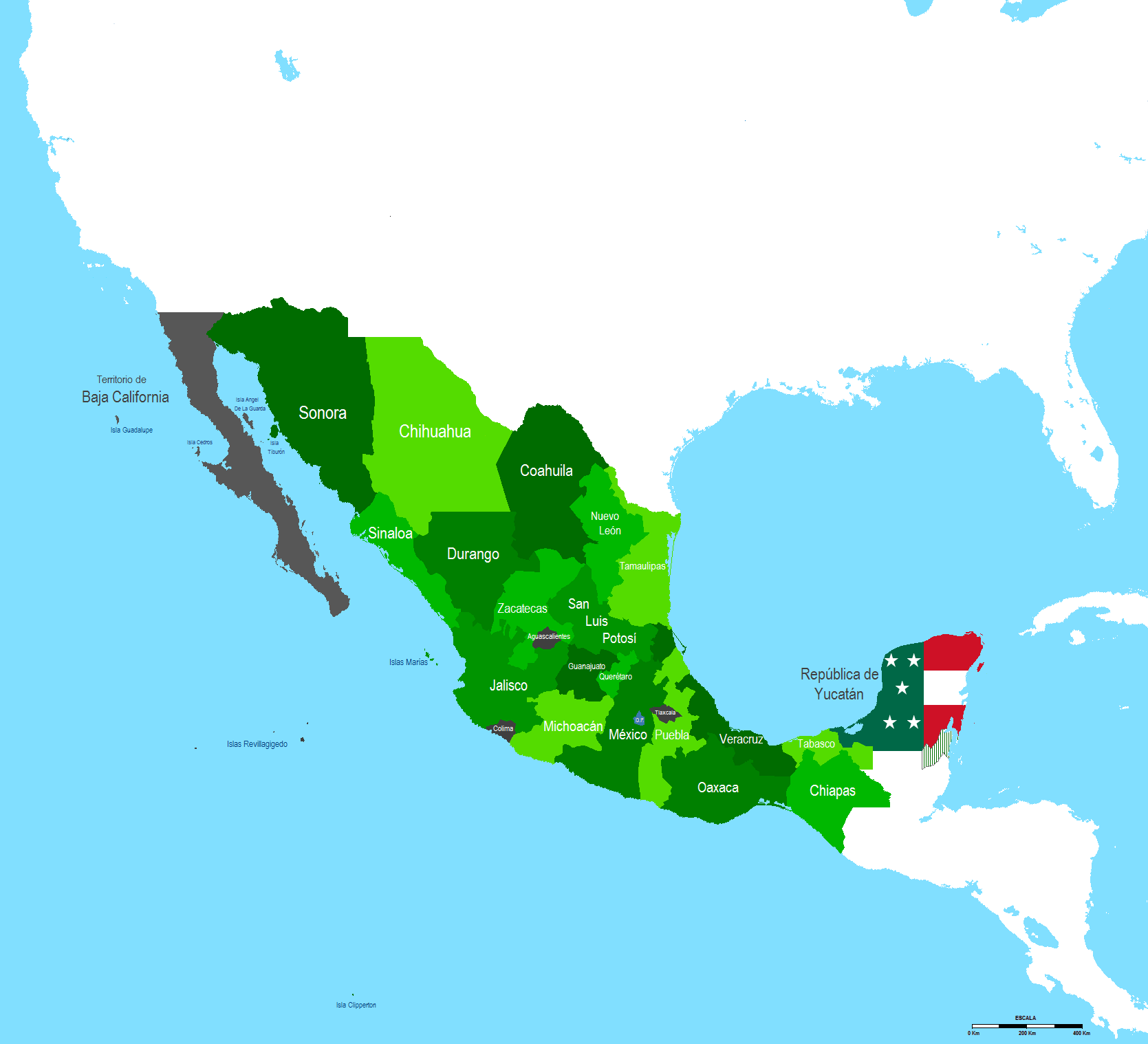

February 2, 1848
The Treaty of Guadalupe Hidalgo officially ended the Mexican–American War, forcing large territorial concessions by Mexico. All claims over Texas were abandoned, while the Rio Grande was established as the permanent border between the countries, thus giving portions of the states of Chihuahua, Coahuila, and Tamaulipas to the United States.

In addition, the U.S. received what is now known as the Mexican Cession, equivalent to the territories of Alta California and Santa Fe de Nuevo México. Including Texas, Mexico ceded an area of approximately 2,500,000 square kilometres (970,000 sq mi) – by its terms, around 55% of its former national territory.

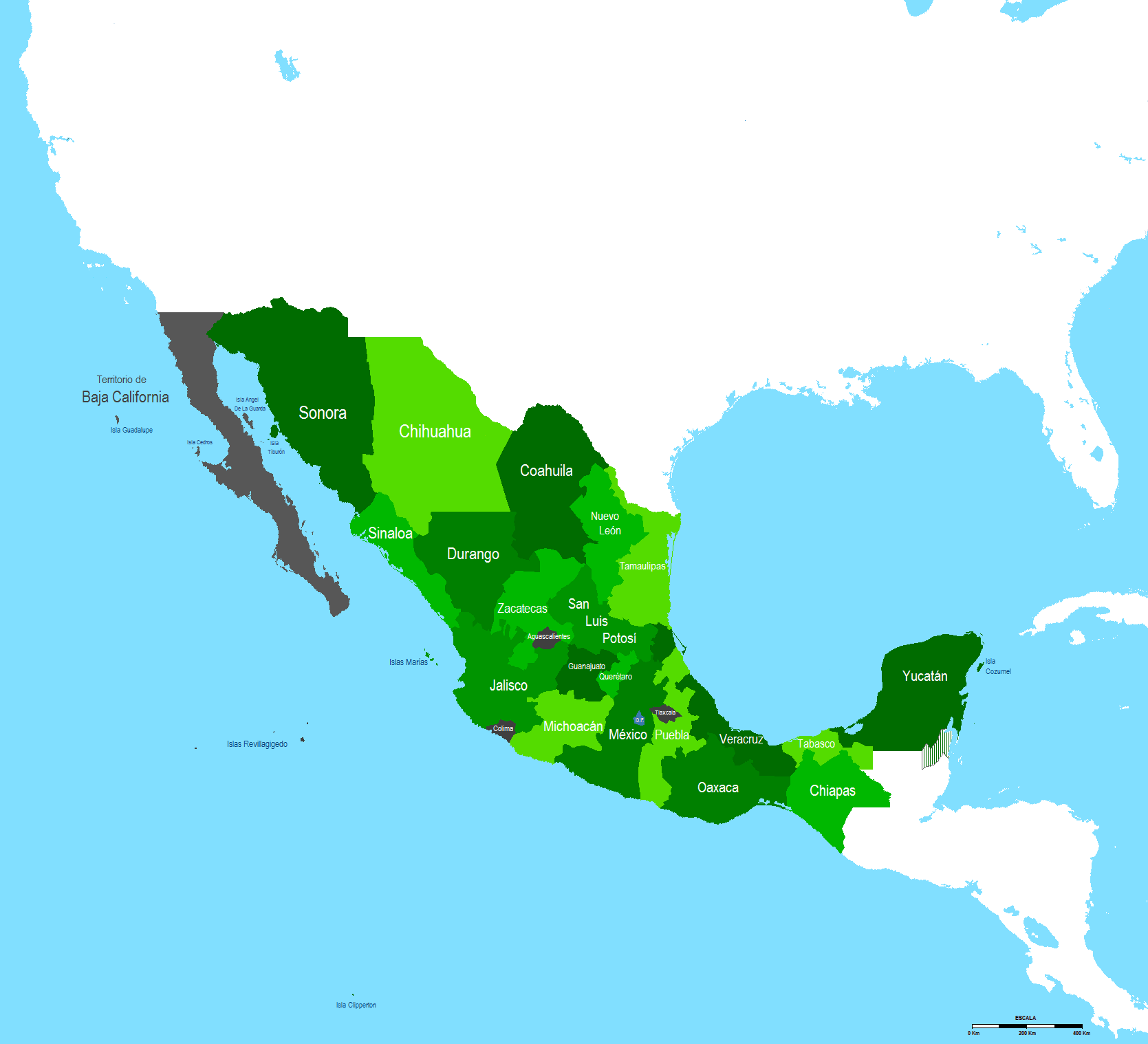

August 17, 1848
On August 22, 1846, interim president José Mariano Salas re-enacted the Constitution of 1824. Two years later, during the government of José Joaquín de Herrera, Yucatán reunited with Mexico.

A decisive factor for the reunion was the Caste War, which forced Yucatán to seek outside help.

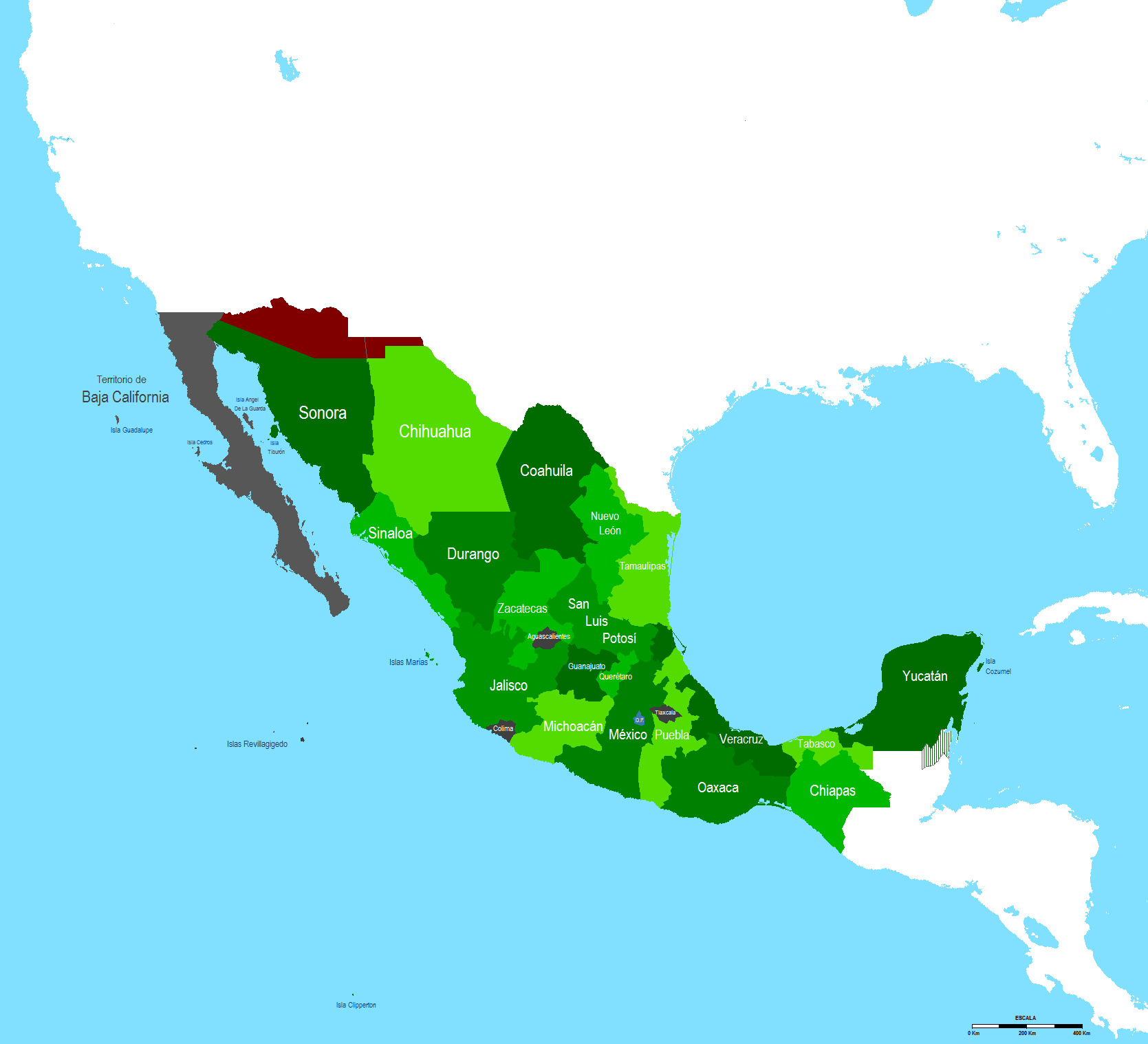

December 30, 1853
On December 30, 1853, Antonio López de Santa Anna signed a treaty with James Gadsden, the U.S. Ambassador to Mexico, which involved the sale of an area of 76,845 square kilometres (29,670 sq mi) from the states of Sonora and Chihuahua to the United States for $10 million. This treaty became known as the Gadsden Purchase (and as Venta de la Mesilla in Mexico).

The treaty was ratified by the United States Senate on April 25, 1854, and signed by U.S. President Franklin Pierce. Final approval by the Mexican Congress took place on June 8, 1854.

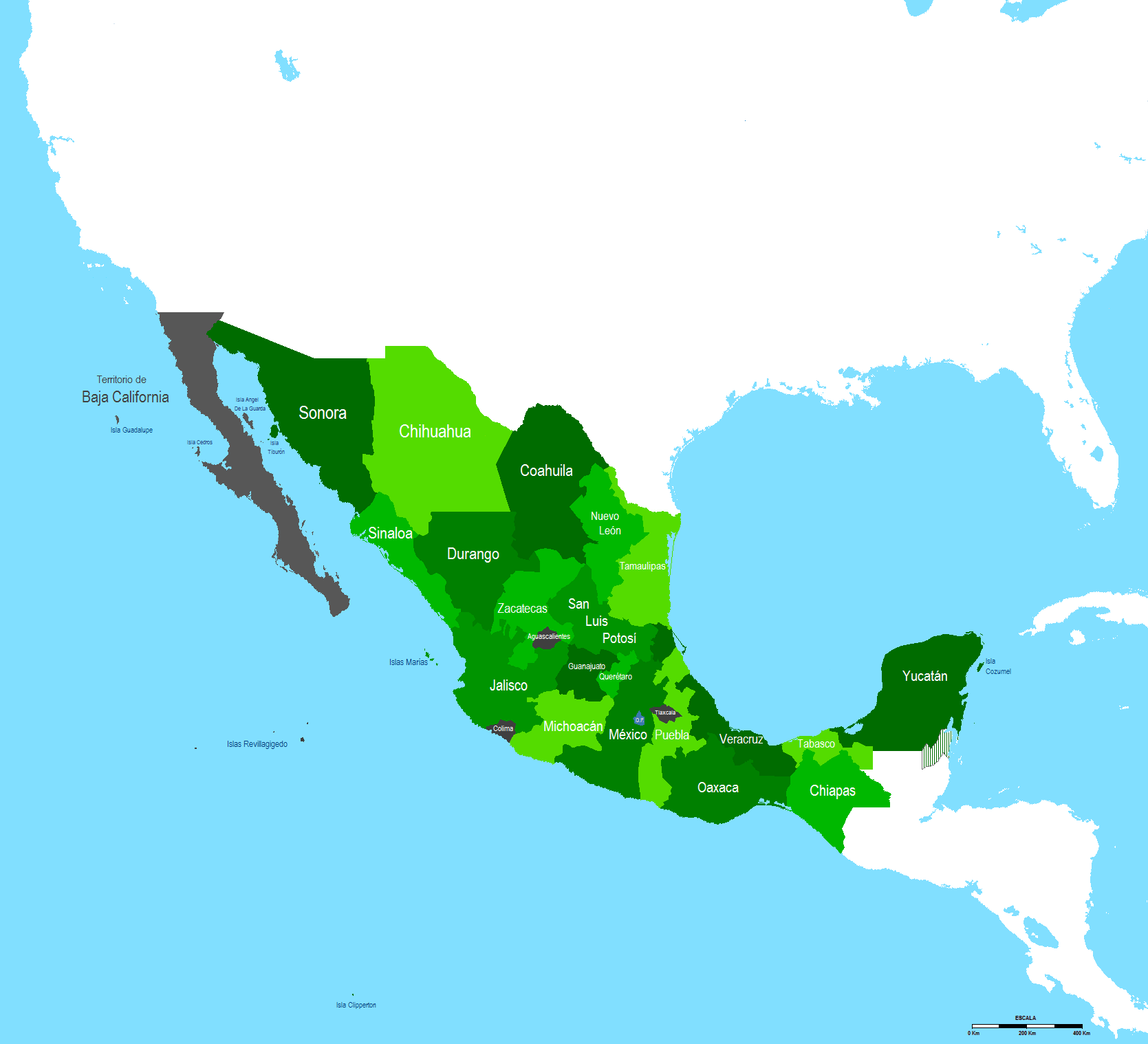

April 25, 1854
After the United States Senate approved the Gadsden Purchase on April 25, 1854, the sale became official.

Mexican people angered by the sale proclaimed the Plan of Ayutla, which finally ended the political career of Santa Anna.

==== 1857–1917 ====
From the Constitution of 1857 to the Constitution of 1917
Map
Date
Description

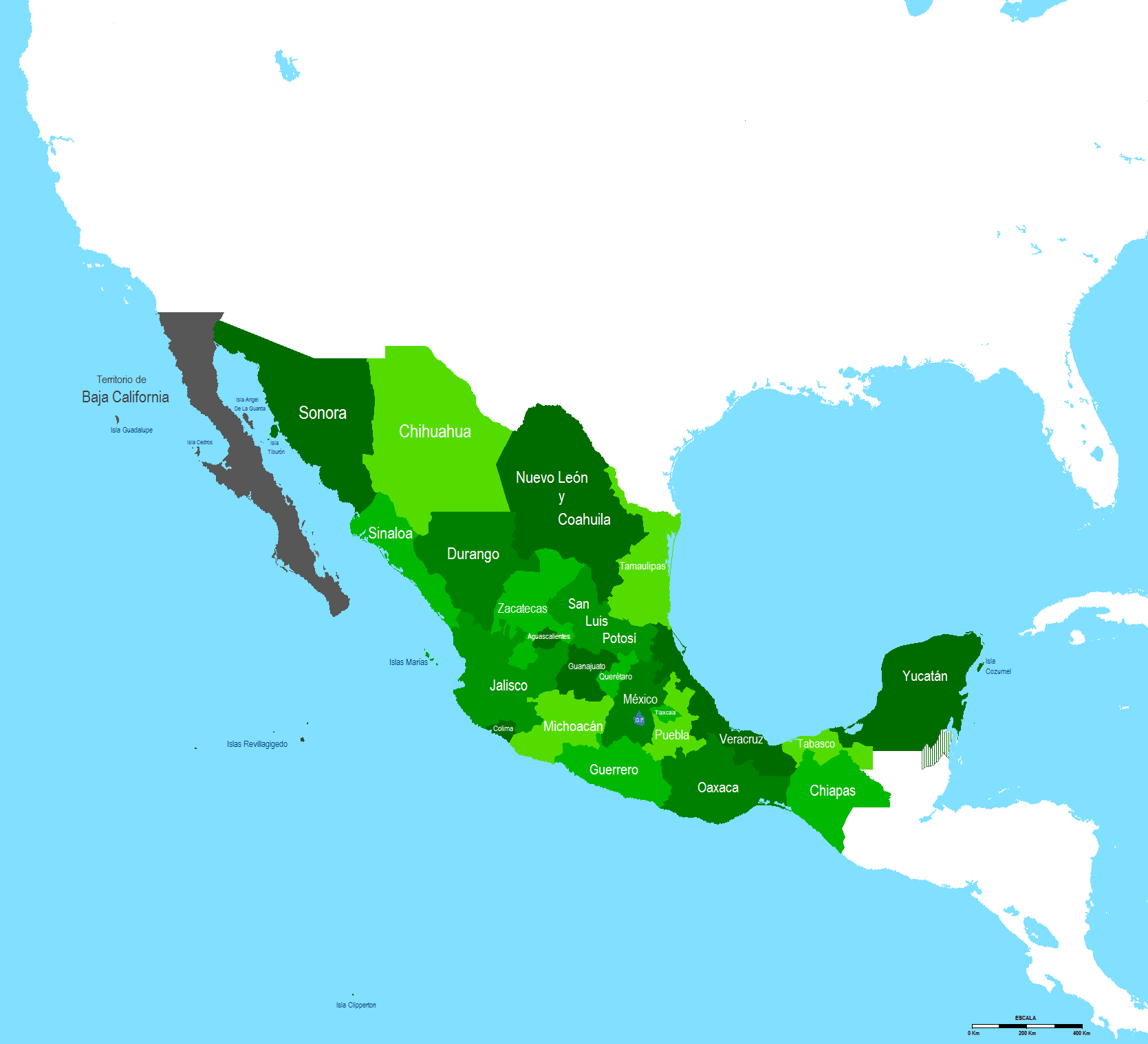

February 5, 1857
The Federal Constitution of the United Mexican States of 1857 approved the reorganization of the national territory. Nuevo León merged with Coahuila, adopting the name of the latter. Also confirmed were the creation of a new state and the admission of 3 of the 4 territories as free states of the federation.

Created as a state.

Order	Name	Date of Admission	Installation date of the Congress
21	Guerrero	27-10-1849	30-01-1850

Admitted as stated:.

Order	Name	Date of Admission	Installation date of the Congress
22	Tlaxcala	09-12-1856	01-06-1857
23	Colima	09-12-1856	19-07-1857
24	Aguascalientes	05-02-1857

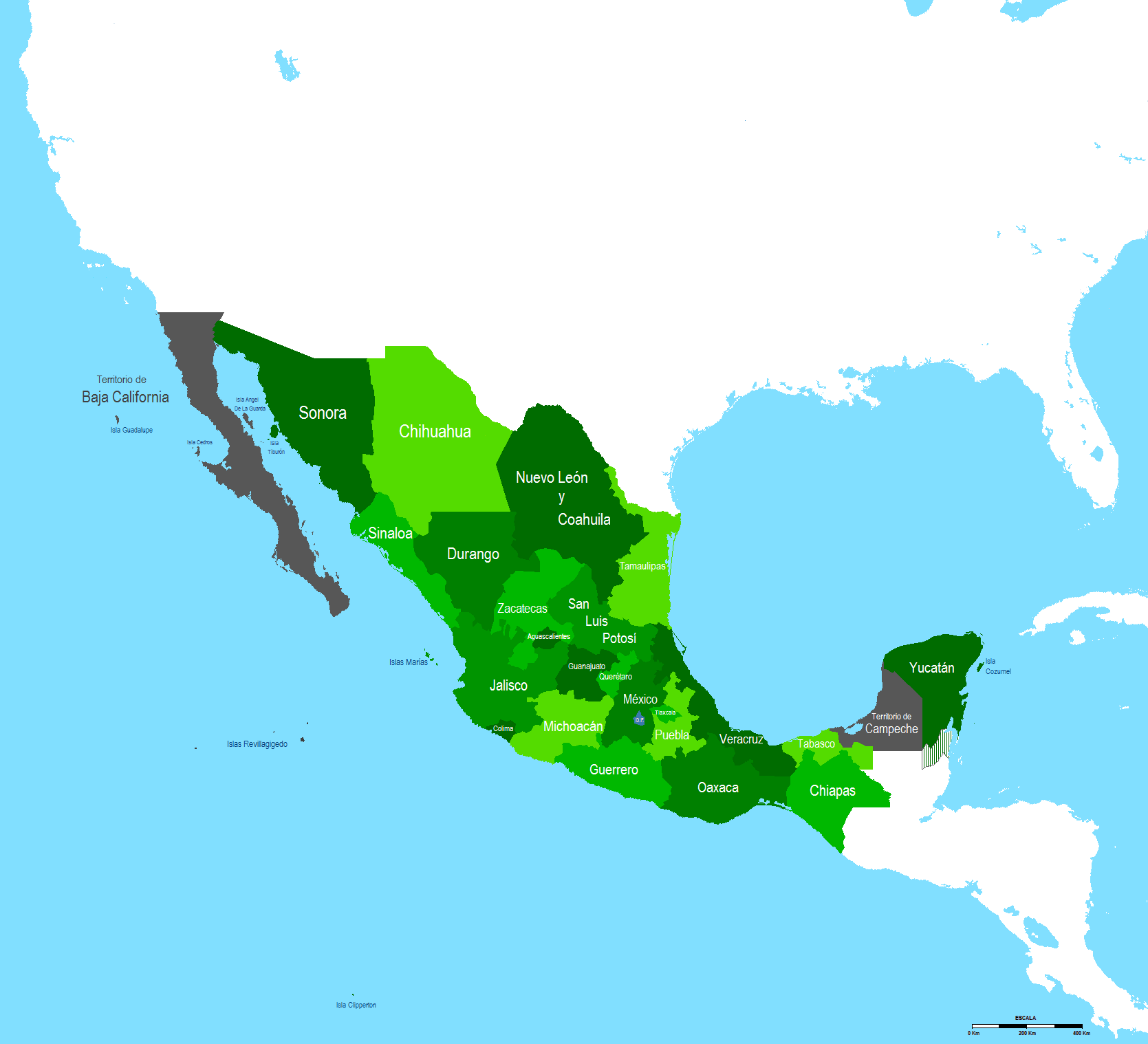

May 3, 1858
The Campeche District was separated from the state of Yucatán, creating the Campeche Territory.

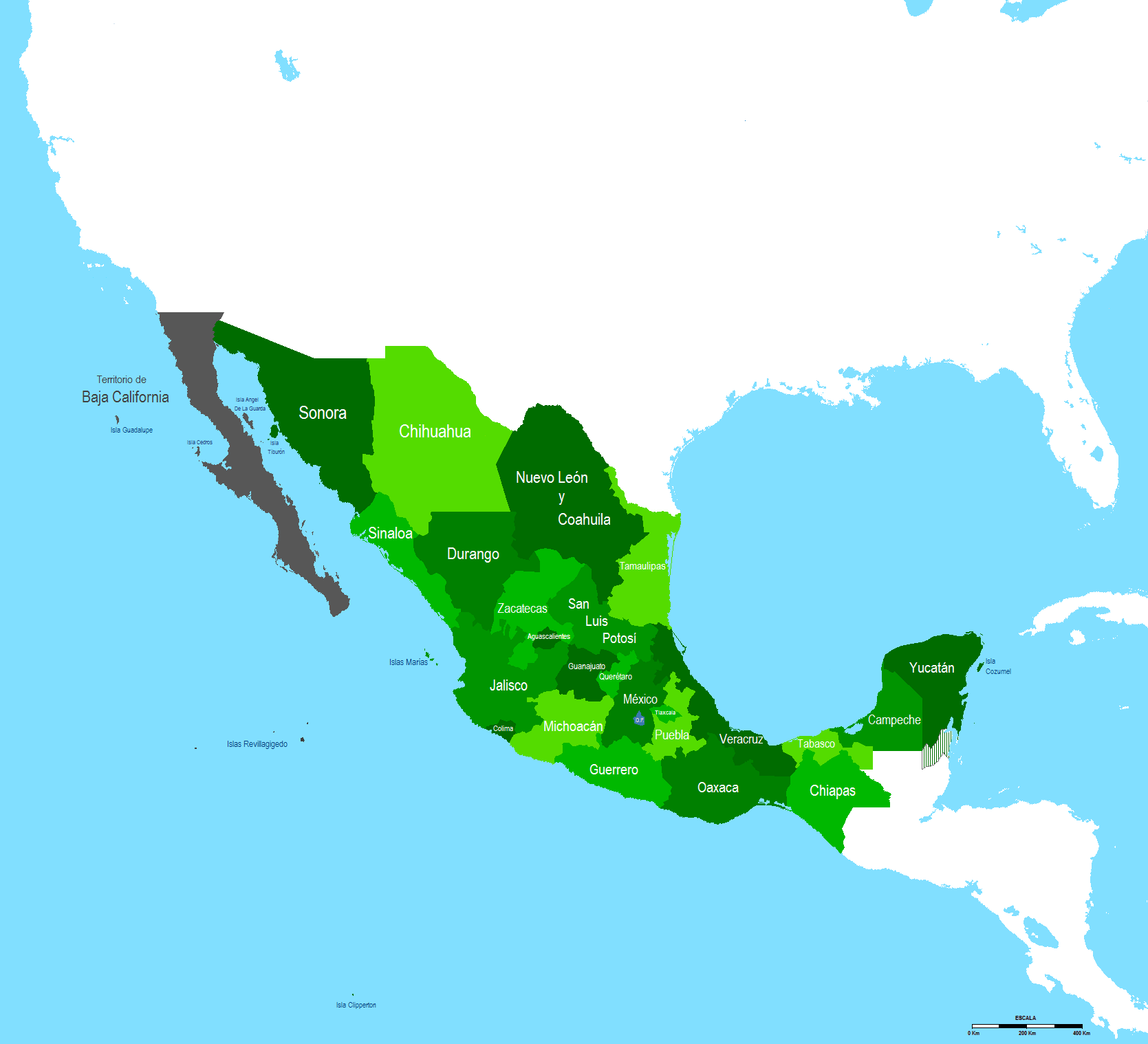

April 29, 1863
Admitted as a state:

Order	Name	Date of Admission	Installation date of the Congress
25	Campeche	29-04-1863

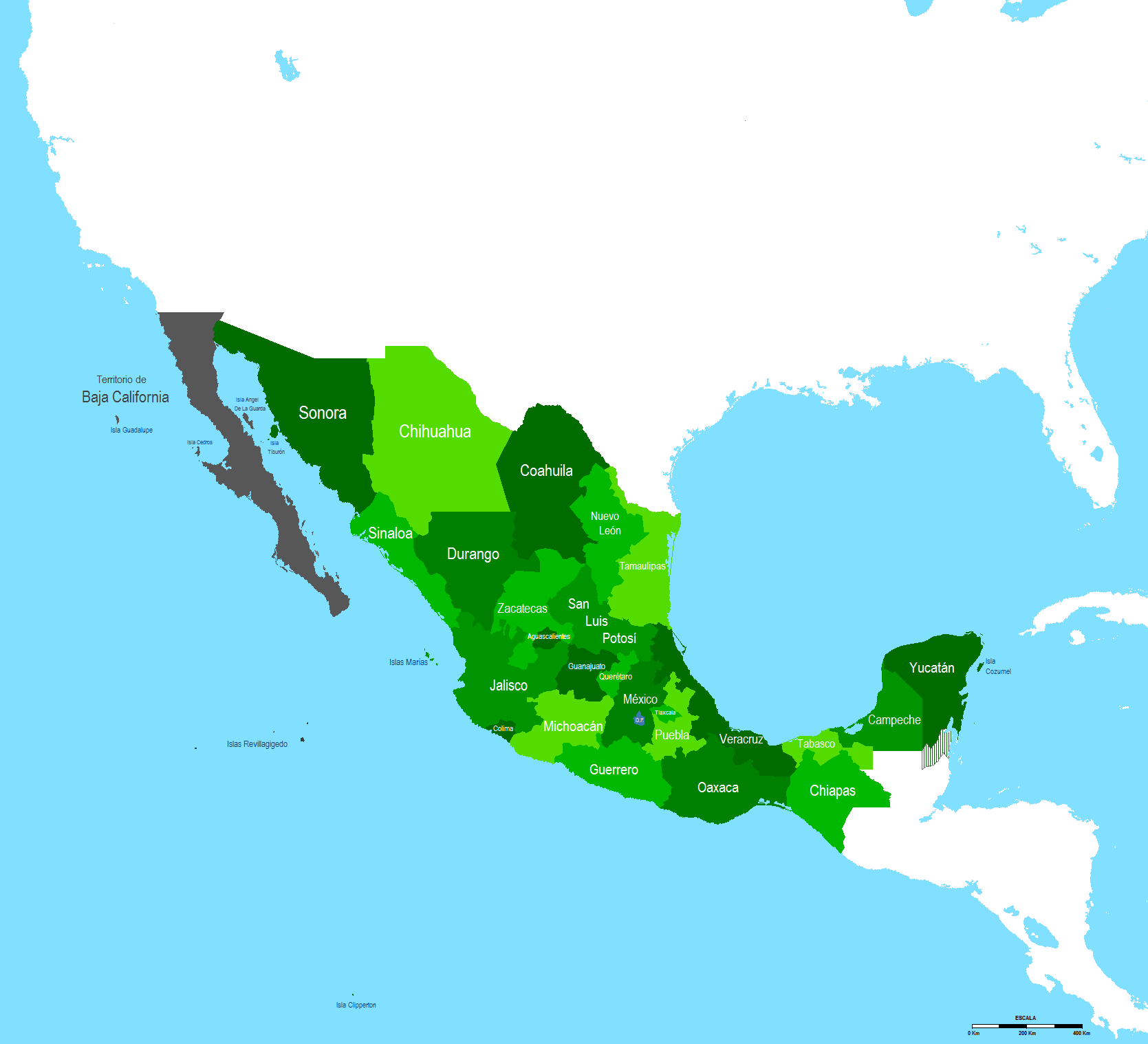

February 26, 1864
President Benito Juárez, at Saltillo, decreed the separation of Coahuila and Nuevo León as 2 free and sovereign states, as they were before 1857.

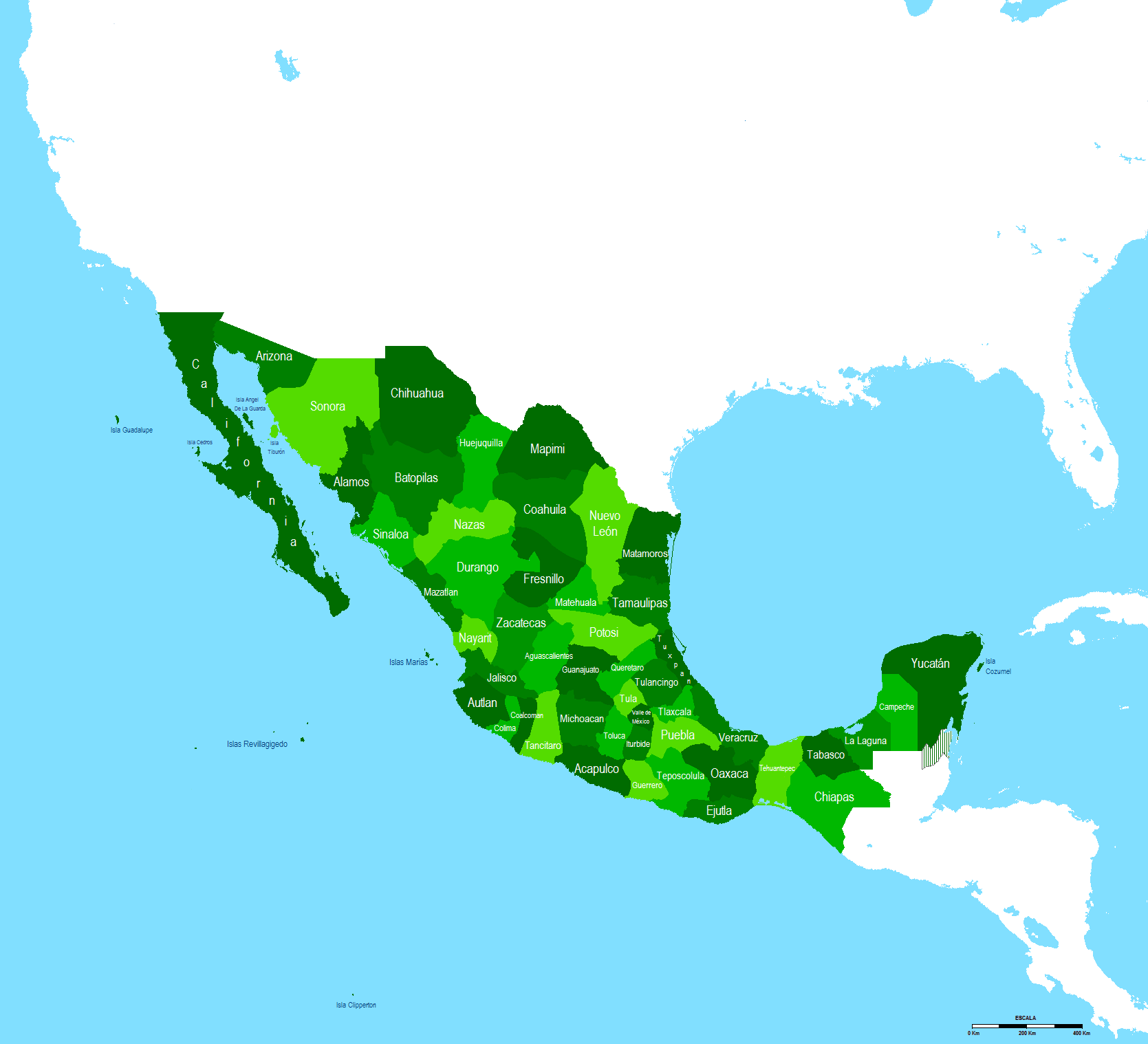

March 3, 1865
On October 3, 1863, conservative Mexicans and the Catholic Church, which were unhappy with the government of Benito Juárez and the constitution of 1857, offered the crown of Mexico to the Austrian archduke Maximilian von Habsburg. On March 3, 1865, he decreed the first division of the territory of the new Empire, which was published in the Journal of the Empire on March 13 of that year.

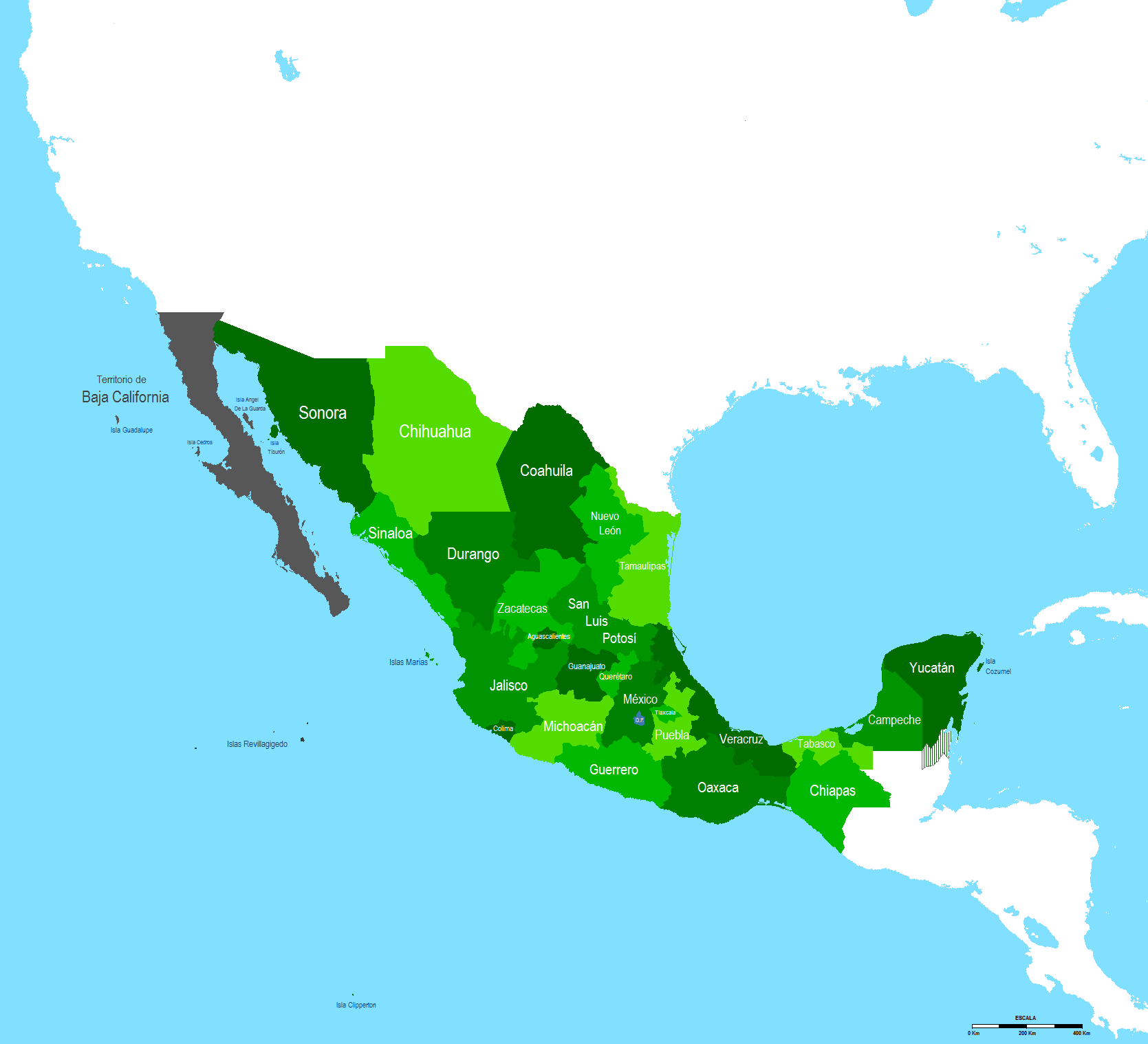

July 15, 1867
Emperor Maximilian was executed.

On 15 July 1867, President Benito Juárez entered the city of Mexico, formally restoring the Federal Republic.

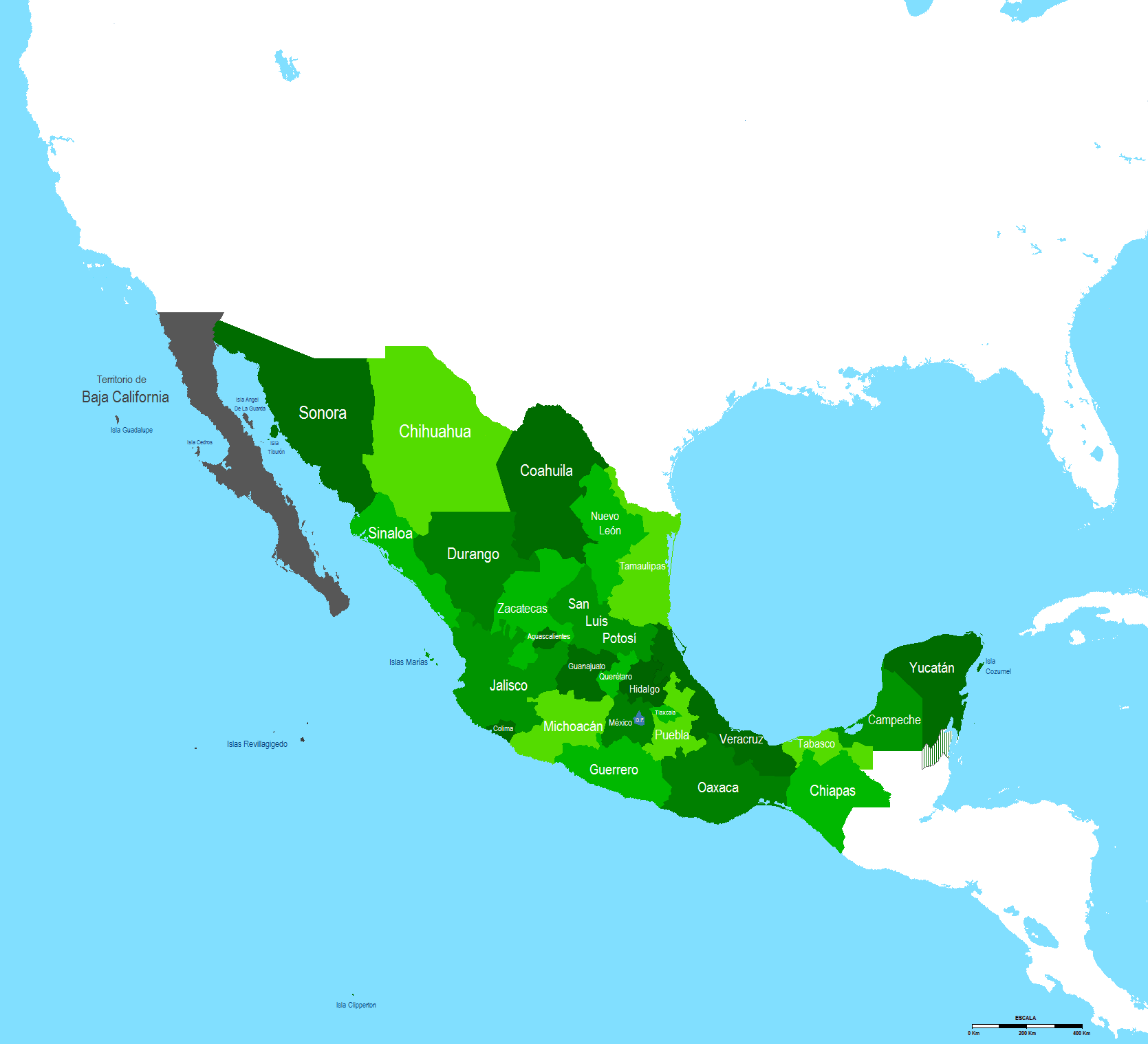

January 16, 1869
By decree of President Benito Juárez and with unanimous approval of Congress, with parts of the State of Mexico

Created as a state.

Order	Name	Date of Admission	Installation date of the Congress
26	Hidalgo	16-01-1869	16-05-1869

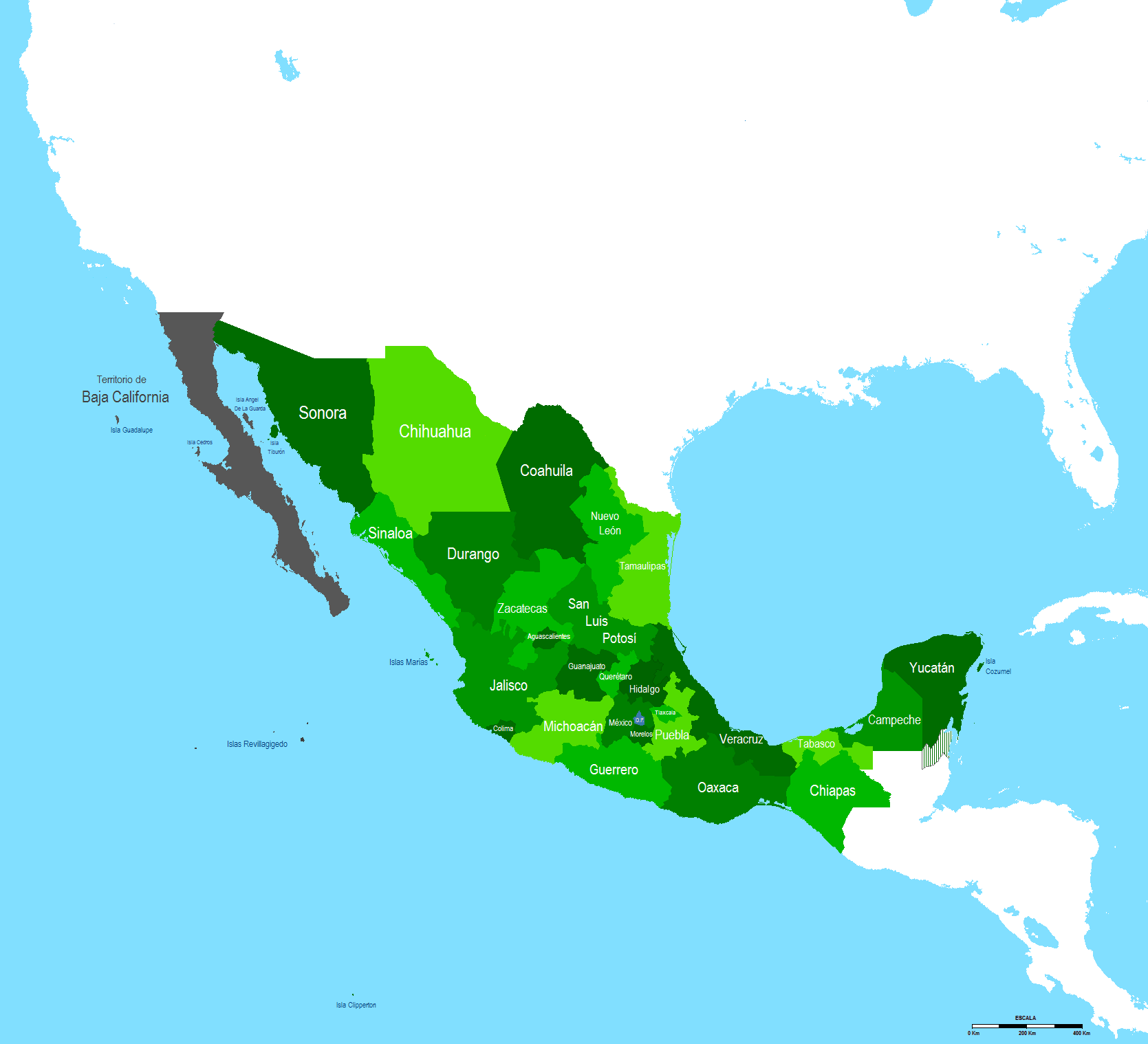

April 17, 1869
By decree of President Benito Juárez and with unanimous approval of Congress, with parts of the Mexico

Created as a state.

Order	Name	Date of Admission	Installation date of the Congress
27	Morelos	17-04-1869

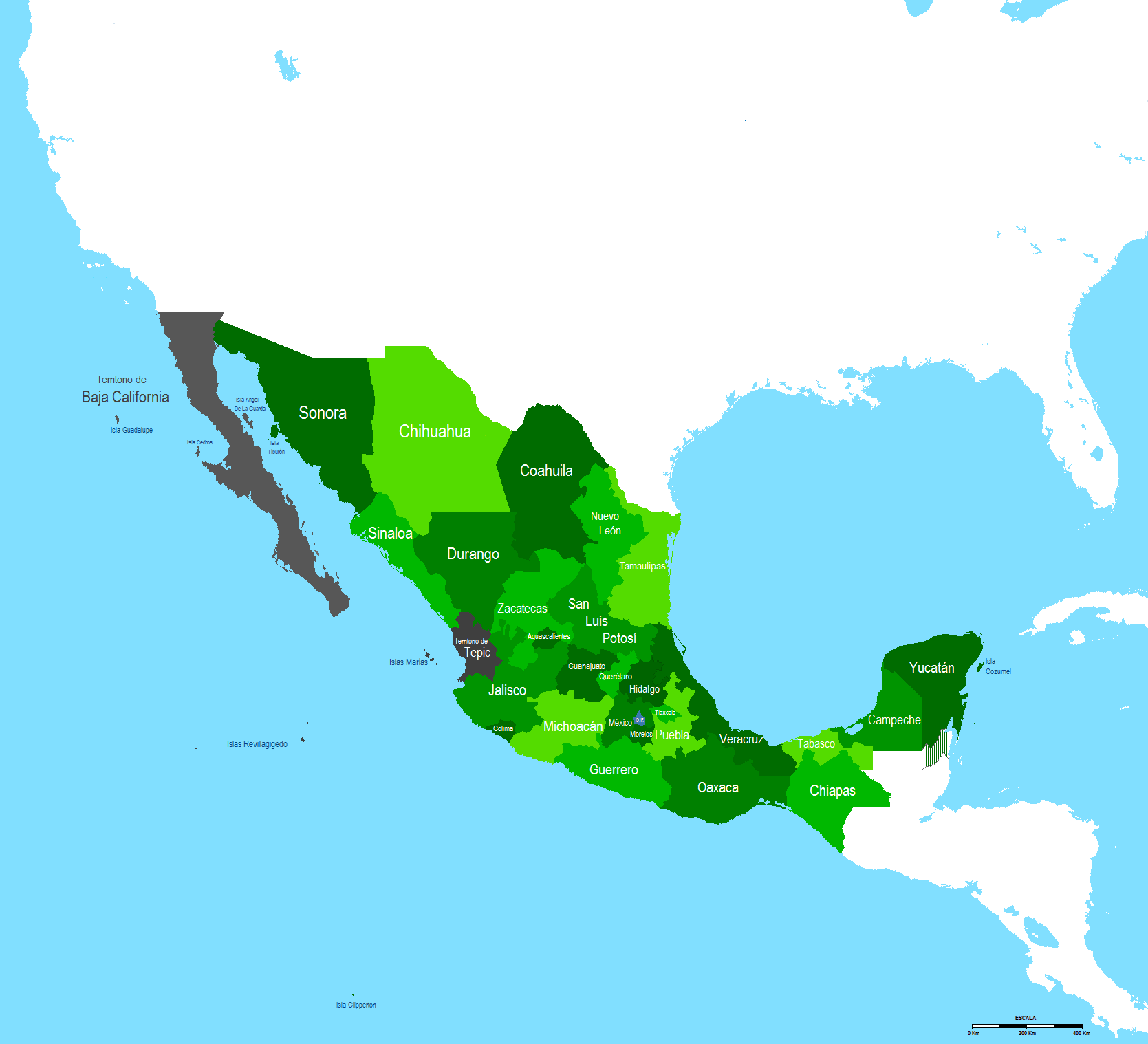

December 12, 1884
By decree of President Manuel González, the Tepic Territory was created, separating from the state of Jalisco.

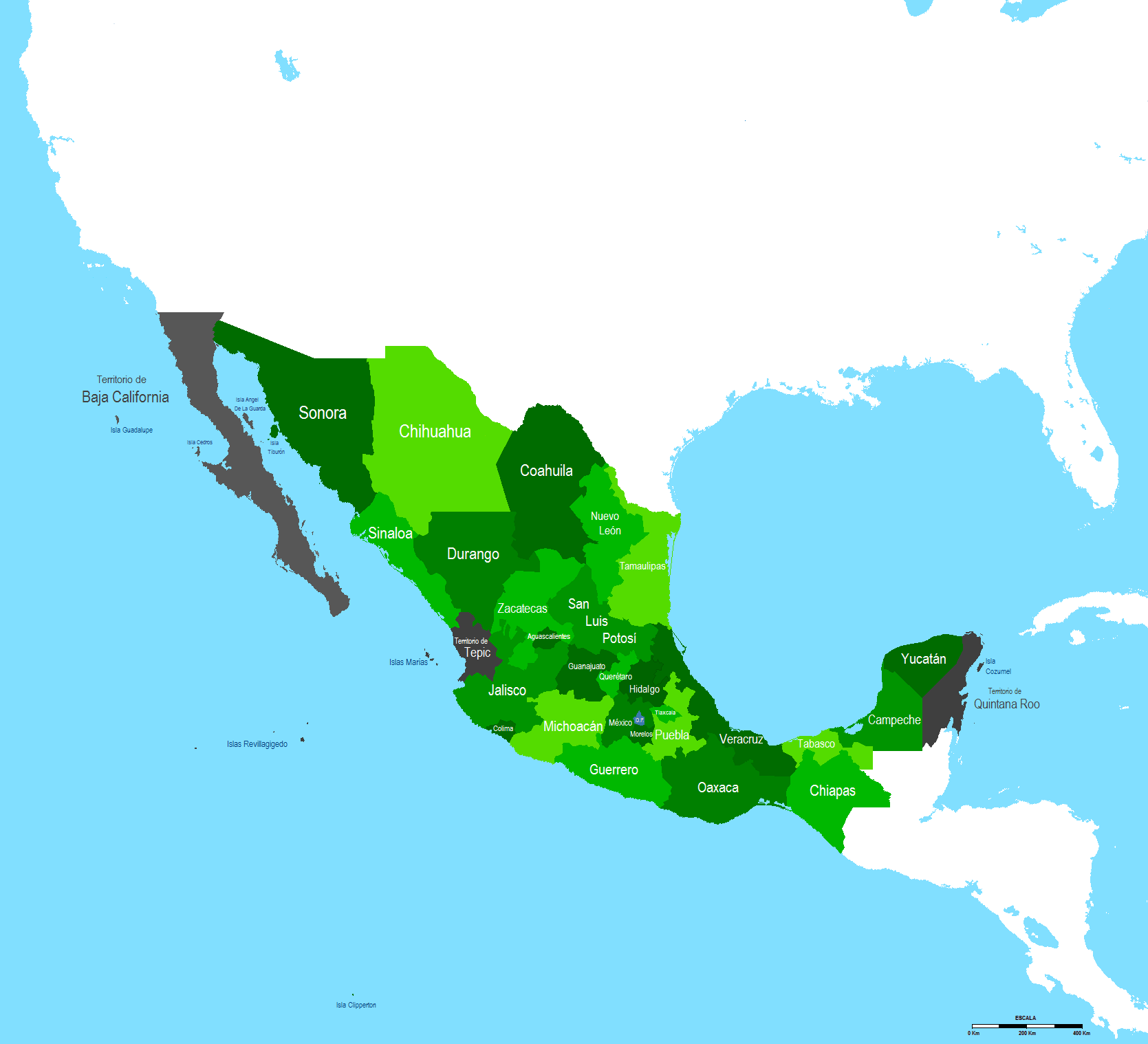

November 24, 1902
Britain and Mexico, in 1893, agreed on the Rio Hondo as the border between Mexico and British Honduras, which was finalized in 1897. By decree of President Porfirio Díaz, the Quintana Roo Territory was created, separating from the state of Yucatán.

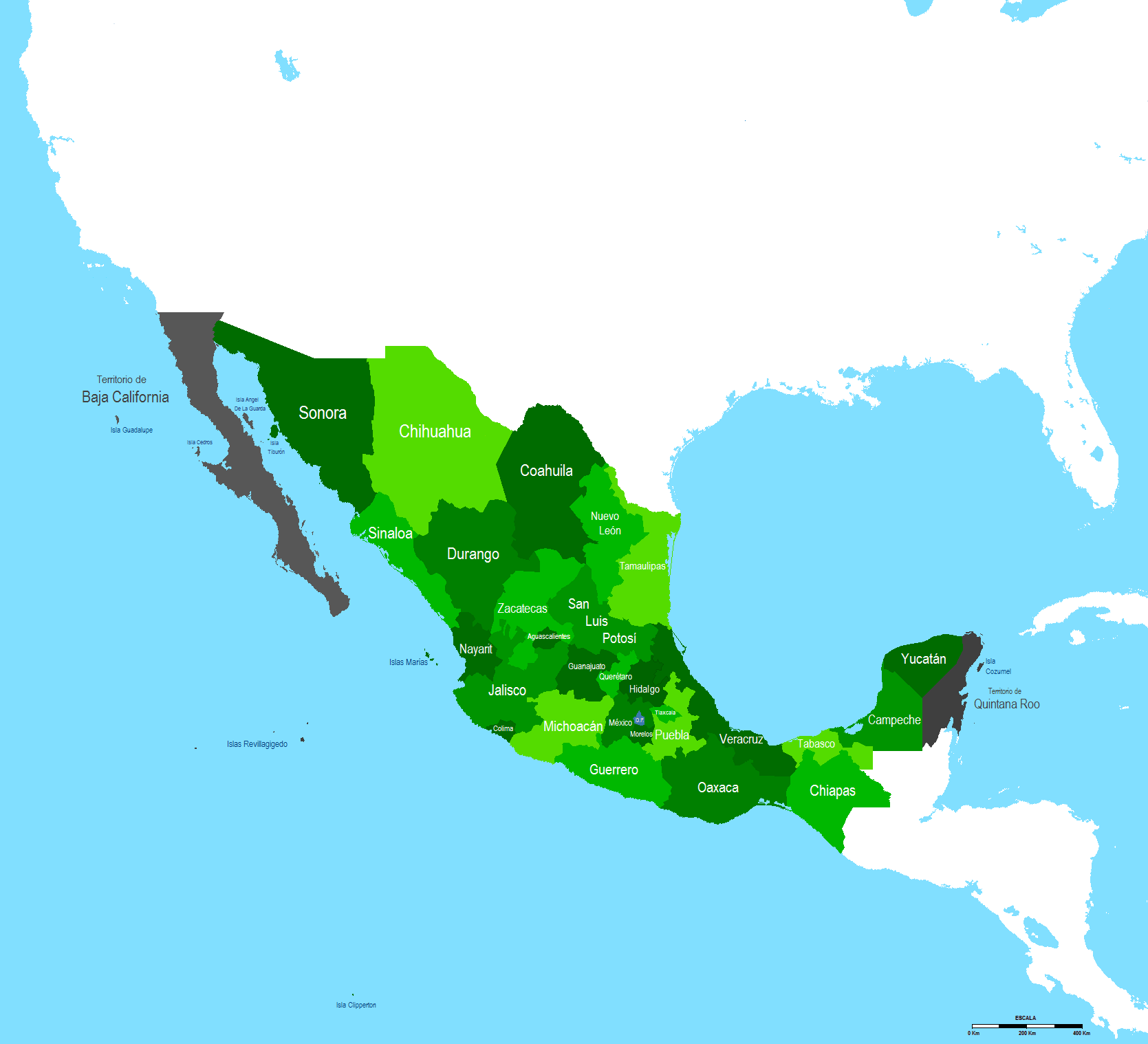

January 26, 1917
The Tepic Territory was admitted as the state of:

Order	Name	Date of Admission	Installation date of the Congress
28	Nayarit	26-01-1917

==== 1917–present ====
From the Constitution of 1917 to present
Map
Date
Description

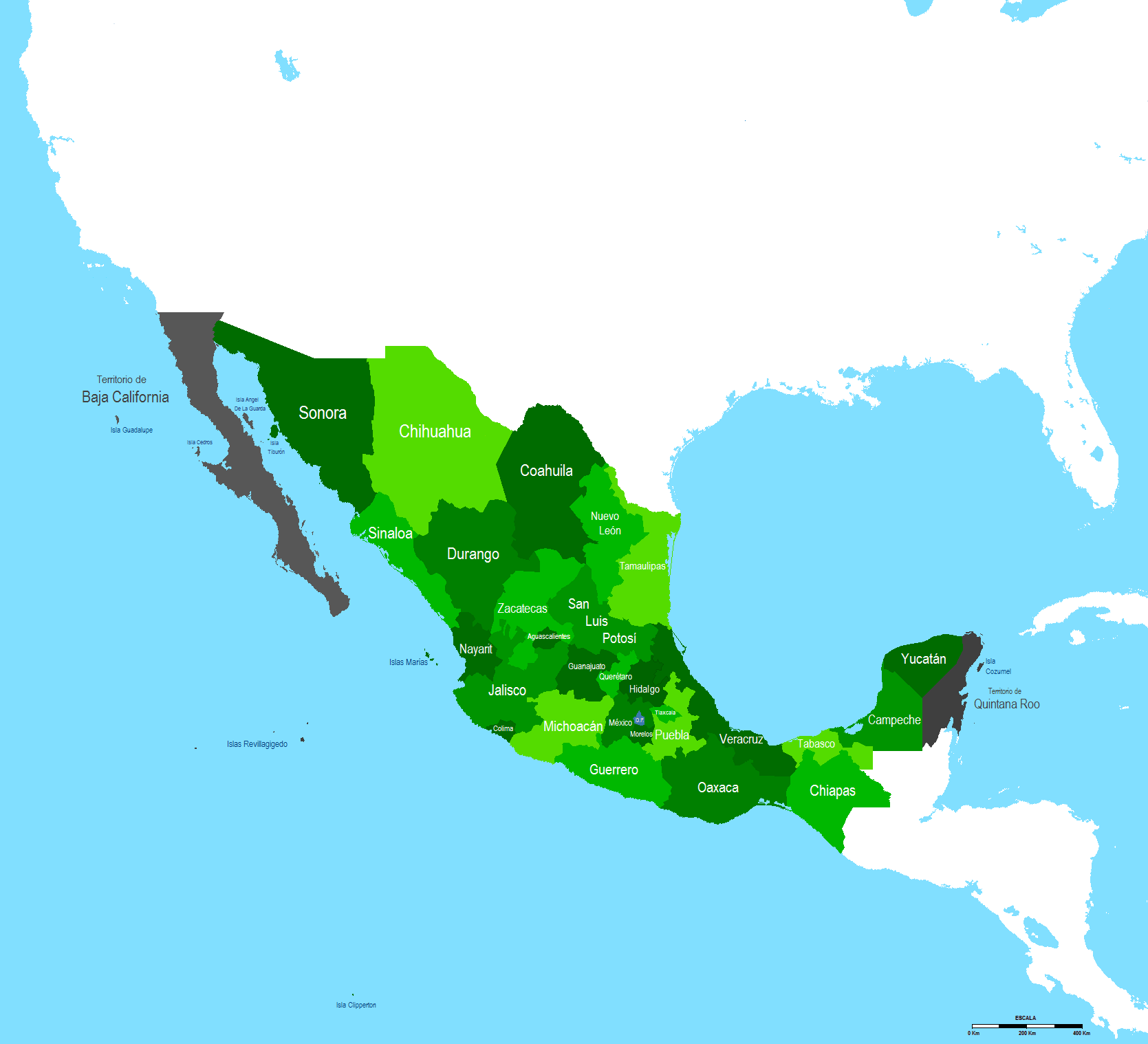

February 5, 1917
As a result of the Mexican Revolution, the Political Constitution of the United Mexican States of 1917 was enacted. The constitution ratified many social demands dating to the beginning of the Revolution, and was the first constitution in history to include so-called social rights. The admission of the state of Nayarit to the federation was ratified.

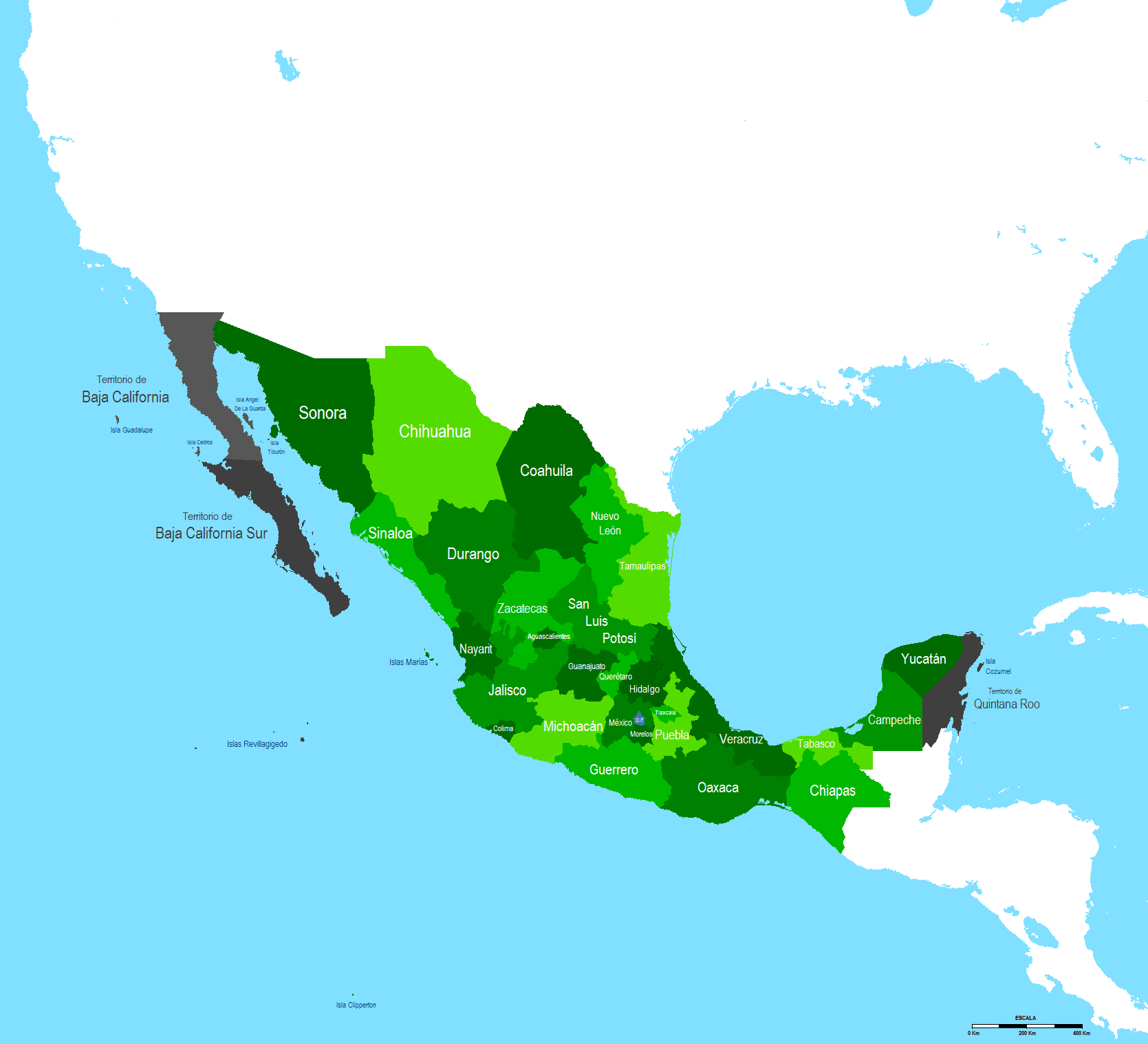

December 30, 1930
On December 30, 1930, Congress and local legislatures approved the amendments to the Constitution, which created the North Territory of Baja California and the South Territory of Baja California, divided at the 28th parallel. They were published in the Official Gazette of the Federation on February 7, 1931.

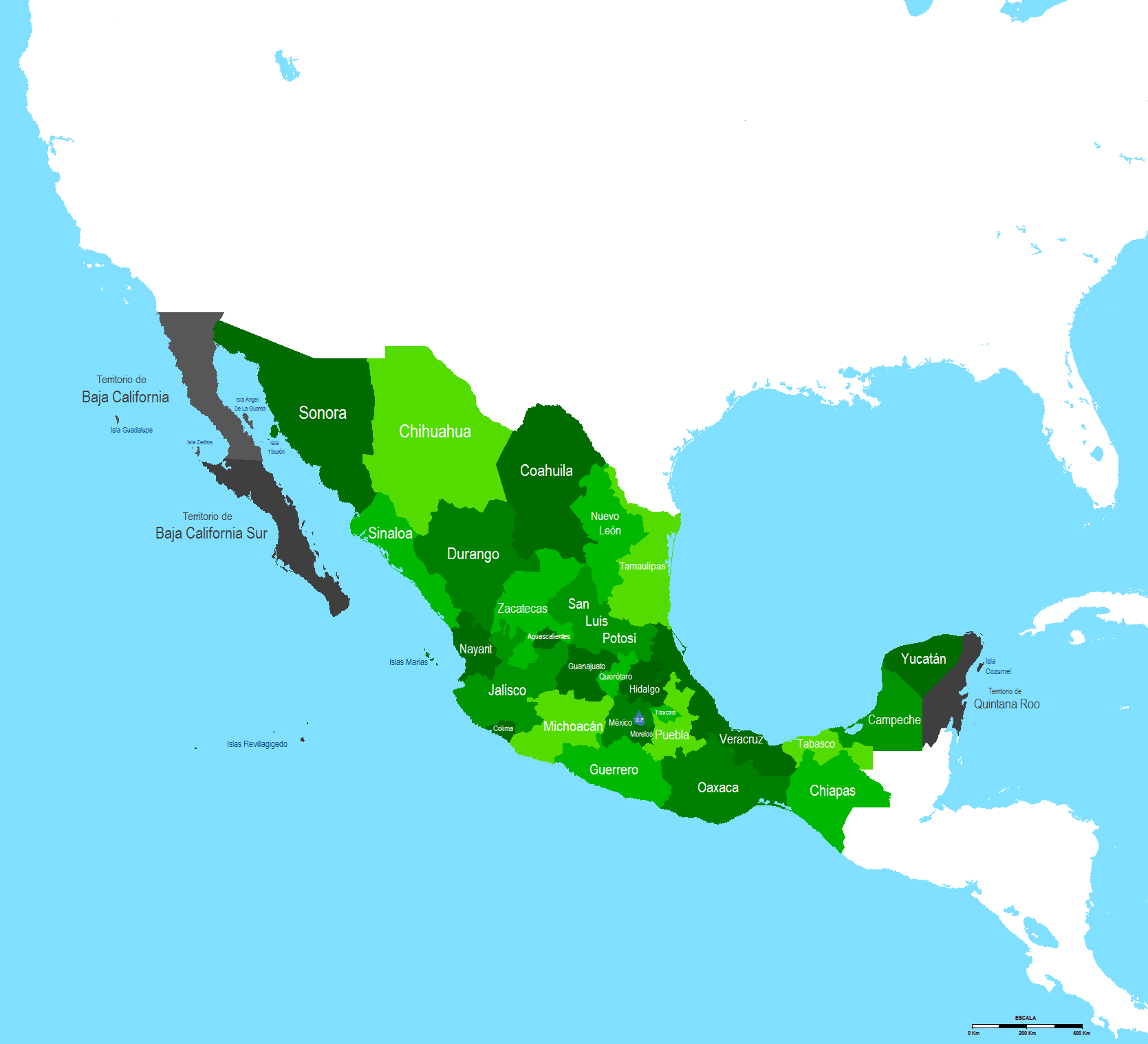

January 28, 1931
Victor Emmanuel III of Italy handed down his verdict in favor of France for the possession of Clipperton Island, also known as Isla de la Pasion, by which Mexico lost the sovereignty of that atoll.

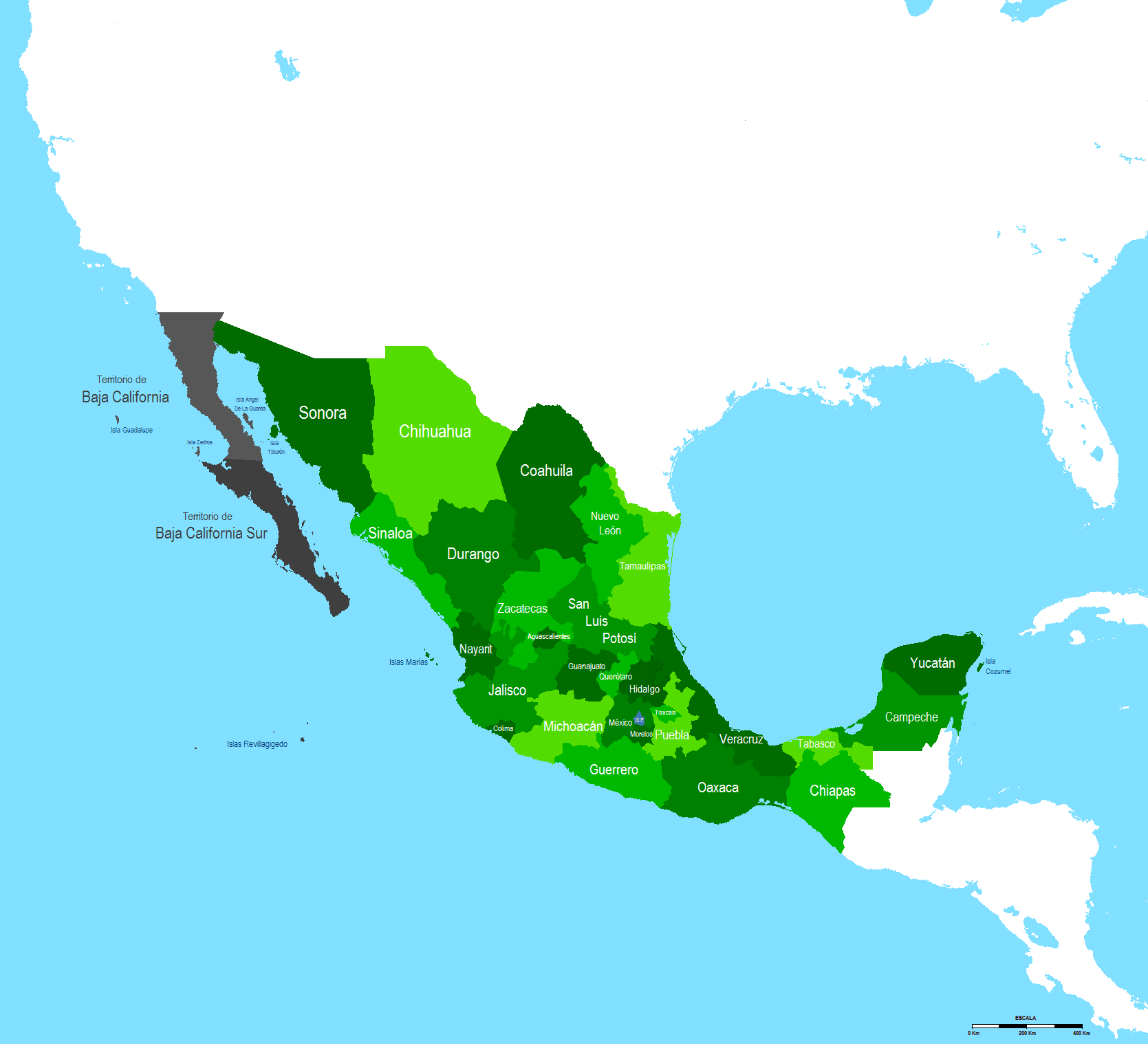

December 14, 1931
President Pascual Ortiz Rubio declared the annexation of the Quintana Roo Territory to the states of Yucatán and Campeche, giving as an excuse that the territory, not being economically self-sufficient, was a huge outflow for the federation.

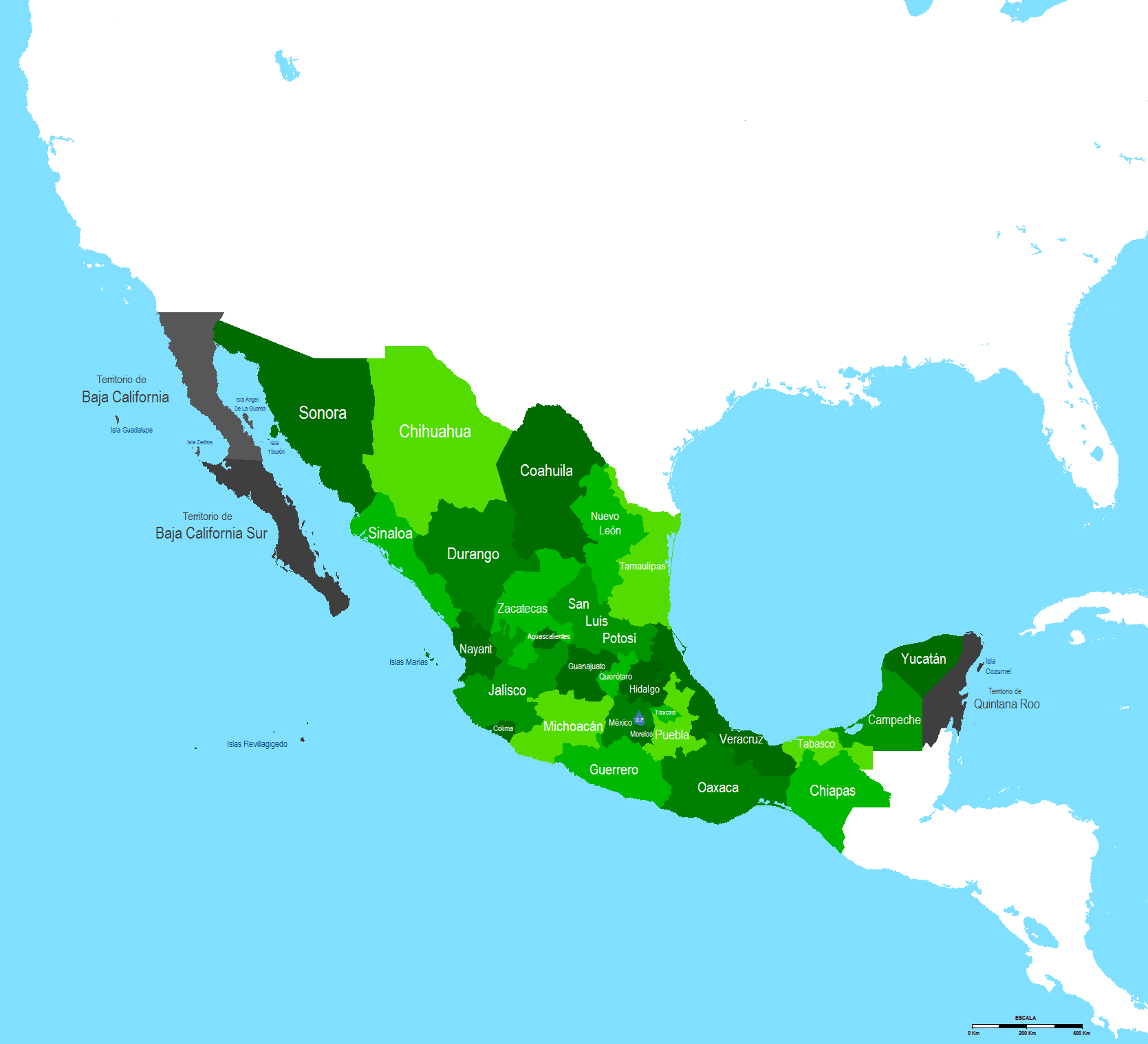

January 11, 1935
President Lázaro Cárdenas issued a decree published in the Official Journal on January 16, 1935, by which the Federal Territory of Quintana Roo was reconstituted.

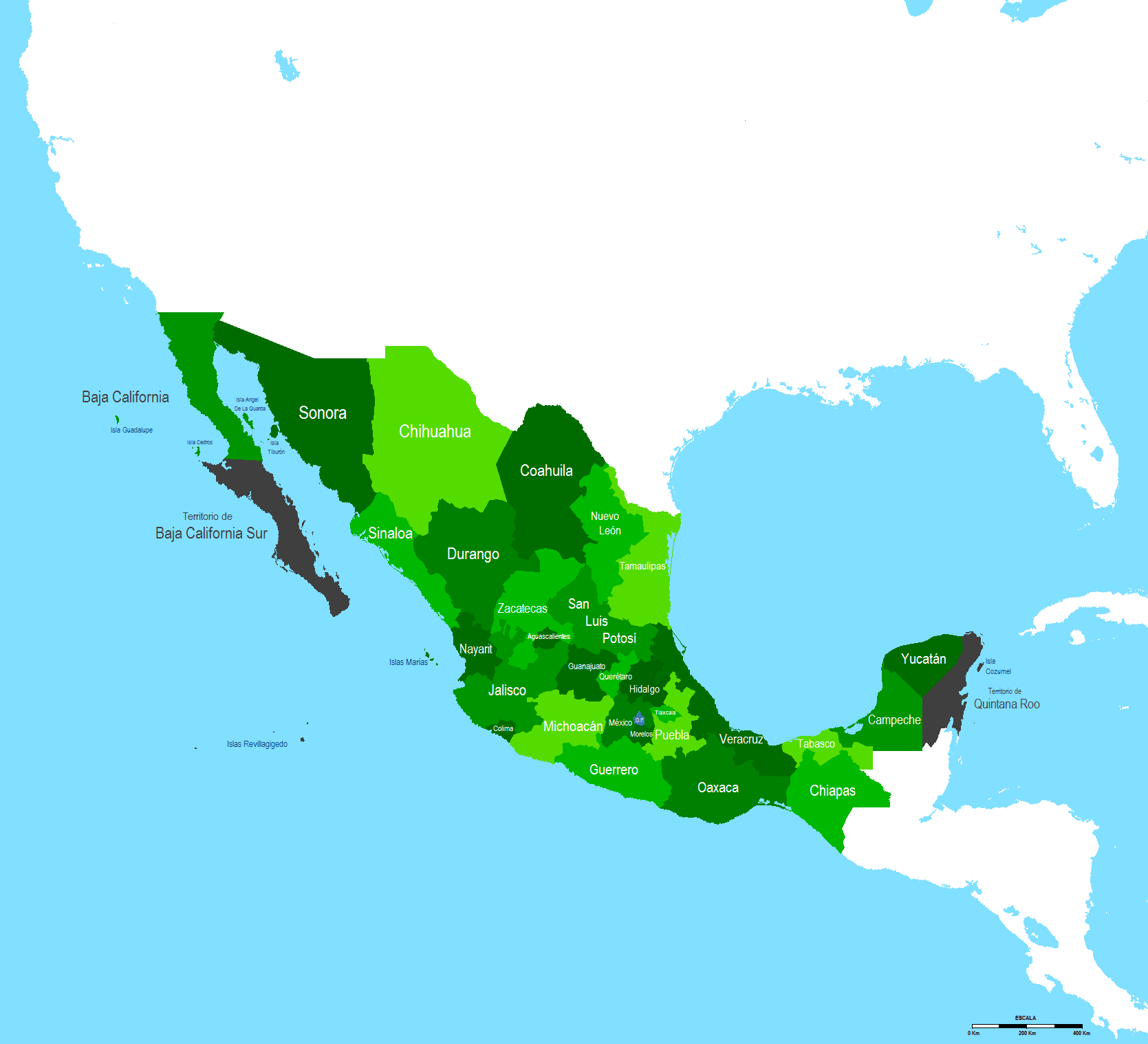

January 16, 1952
President Miguel Alemán Valdés announced on September 1, 1951, that the North Territory of Baja California, due to its population and its economic ability to survive, satisfied the conditions required by the Constitution to be admitted as a free and sovereign state .

The North Territory of Baja California was admitted as the state of.

Order	Name	Date of Admission
29	Baja California	16-01-1952

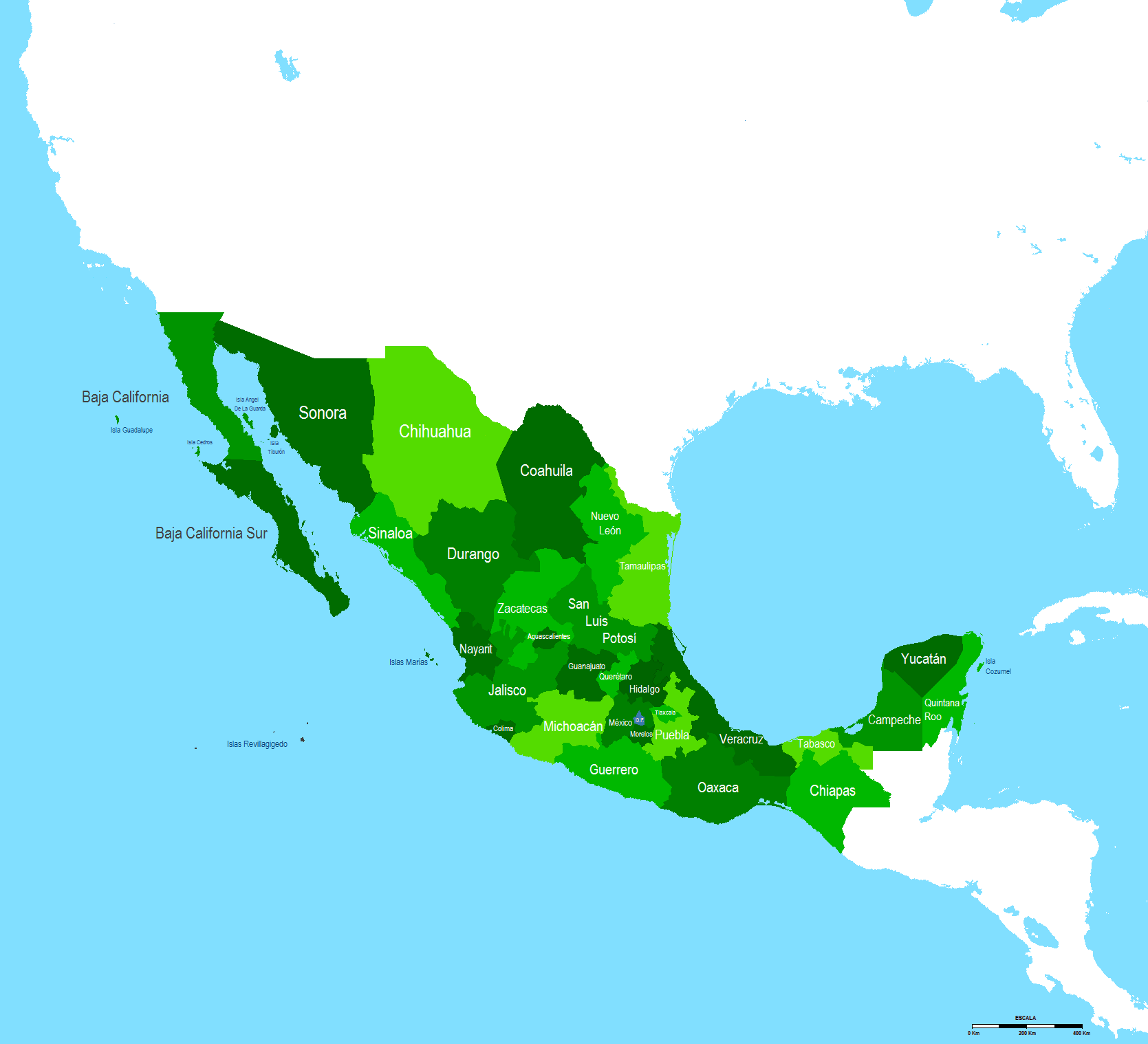

October 8, 1974
President Luis Echeverría Álvarez sent to the Congress of Mexico a bill for the Quintana Roo Territory and the South Territory of Baja California to be elevated to the category of states.

Following the approval of state legislatures, on October 8, 1974, the decree, giving Mexico its current configuration, was published in the Official Gazette of the Federation.

The South Territory of Baja California and the Quintana Roo Territory were admitted as the states of:.

Order	Name	Date of Admission	Installation date of the Congress
30	Quintana Roo	08-10-1974	25-11-1974
31	Baja California Sur	08-10-1974	25-03-1975

Mexico–United States International Boundary and Water Commission
International Boundary and Water Commission

The Banco Convention of 1905 resulted in many exchanges of bancos (land surrounded by bends in the river that became segregated from either country by a cutoff, often due to rapid accretion or avulsion of the alluvial channel) between the two nations, most often in the Lower Rio Grande Valley. Under the treaty, the following transfers involving Texas occurred from 1910 – 1976:

Year	# Bancos	Acres to USA	Acres to Mexico	Year	# Bancos	Acres to USA	Acres to Mexico
1910	57	5357.1	3101.2	1942	1	63.3	0
1912	31	1094.4	2342.8	1943	4	482.9	100.5
1928	42	3089.9	1407.8	1944	14	253.7	166.2
1930	31	4685.7	984.3	1945	16	240.9	333.5
1931	4	158.4	328.7	1946	1	185.8	0
1932	2	159.7	0	1949	2	190.2	182.0
1933	1	0	122.1	1956	1	508.3	0
1934	1	278.1	0	1968	1	0	154.6
1939	1	240.2	0	1970	21	449.8	1881.8
1940	2	0	209.5	1976	6	49.2	0
1941	6	224.5	246.9	Total	245	17,712 acres (71.68 km^{2})	11,662 acres (47.19 km^{2})

1910 – November 24, 2009

In 1927, under the same 1905 Convention, the U.S. acquired two bancos from Mexico at the Colorado River border with Arizona. Farmers Banco, covering 583.4 acres (2.361 km^{2}), a part of the Cocopah Indian Reservation at 32°37′27″N 114°46′45″W, was ceded to the U.S. with controversy. Fain Banco (259 acres (1.05 km^{2})) at 32°31′32″N 114°47′28″W also became U.S. soil.

The Rio Grande Rectification Treaty of 1933 straightened and stabilized the 155 miles (249 km) of river boundary through the highly developed El Paso-Juárez Valley. Numerous parcels of land (174) were transferred between the two countries during the construction period, 1935 – 1938. At the end, each nation had ceded an equal area of land (2,560.5 acres (10.362 km^{2})) to the other. The Chamizal Treaty of 1963, which ended a hundred-year dispute between the two countries near El Paso, Texas, transferred 630 acres (2.5 km^{2}) from the U.S. to Mexico in 1967. In return, Mexico transferred 264 acres (1.07 km^{2}) to the U.S.

The Boundary Treaty of 1970 transferred 823 acres (3.33 km^{2}) of Mexican territory to the U.S., in areas near Presidio and Hidalgo, Texas, to build flood control channels. In exchange, the U.S. ceded 2,177 acres (8.81 km^{2}) to Mexico, including five parcels near Presidio, the Horcon Tract containing the little town of Rio Rico, Texas, and Beaver Island near Roma, Texas. The last of these transfers occurred in 1977. On November 24, 2009, the U.S. ceded 6 islands in the Rio Grande to Mexico, totaling 107.81 acres (0.4363 km^{2}). At the same time, Mexico ceded 3 islands and 2 cuts to the U.S., totaling 63.53 acres (0.2571 km^{2}). This transfer, which had been pending for 20 years, was the first application of Article III of the 1970 Boundary Treaty.

== The Centralist Republic ==
=== The Seven Constitutional Laws ===
The Centralist Republic with the separatist movements generated by the dissolution of the Federal Republic. Area in rebellion Area claimed by the Republics of Texas and the Rio Grande Area not in rebellion

By the law of October 3, 1835, the centralist system was introduced in the country. The entities that formed the Republic lost their freedom, independence, and sovereignty, becoming entirely subordinate to the central government.

The Seven Constitutional Laws were enacted on December 30, 1836. The sixth discussed the territorial configuration in its first and second articles. Shortly thereafter, the Eighth Organic Base—a separate statute from the Seven Laws—was enacted. The first article stipulated that the country would be composed of many departments, corresponding to the previously existing states, except that:

1. Coahuila and Texas were separated into two different departments
2. Colima Territory would be integrated into the Michoacán Department
3. Tlaxcala Territory would be integrated into the Mexico Department
4. The Federal District was eliminated

Accordingly, the new territorial division was composed of 24 departments. That initial territorial composition was regarded as final until 30 June 1838, by law of that date. This period created a great political instability that began with regional problems and conflicts between the central entity and the states of the country. Rebellions were raised in several places, among which the following were particularly distinguished:

- Zacatecas was the first state to declare itself against centralism in the so-called 1835 Revolt in Zacatecas, which was quickly extinguished. As punishment for this rebellion, part of the territory of Zacatecas was split off and turned into the Aguascalientes Territory
- The Texas region of the state of Coahuila and Texas declared its independence from Mexico on October 2, 1835, forming the Republic of Texas
- Coahuila, Nuevo León, and Tamaulipas declared themselves independent of Mexico on January 17, 1840, as the Republic of the Rio Grande. The Republic was never truly independent, since the rebels were quickly overthrown. The Republic was dissolved on 6 November 1840
- Yucatán, which had joined the federation under the condition of a Federated Republic, declared its independence in 1840 (officially on October 1, 1841). This historic event resulted in the birth of the second Republic of Yucatán, which returned permanently to the nation in 1848
- On 13 February 1841, Tabasco declared itself as an independent state from Mexico, due to conflicts with the new centralized system. But on 2 December 1842, it was returned to back to Mexico itself.

On August 22, 1846, due to the war with the United States, the Federal Constitution of the United Mexican States of 1824 was restored. There remained the separation of Yucatán, but 2 years later, Yucatán definitively rejoined Mexico.

=== The Basis for Administration of the Republic ===
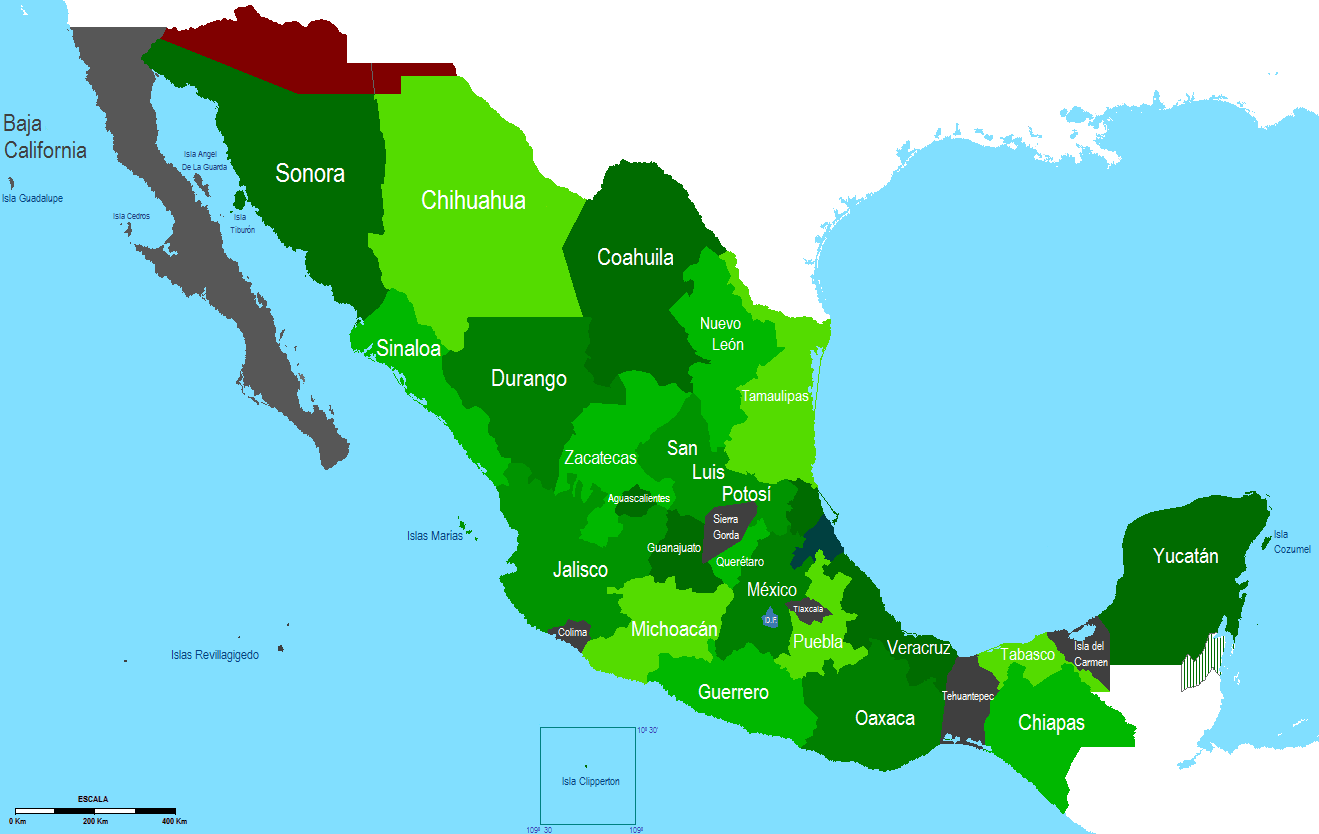
Map of Mexico between 1853 and 1856 during the Basis for the Administration of the Republic until the promulgation of the Constitution of 1857.

A change in the governance of the country was determined by the Decree of 22 April 1853, which, from that moment, recognized the Basis for the Administration of the Republic as the fundamental law for the reorganization of government. In this precept, in the first and second articles, the Section of Internal Governance, the independence and sovereignty of states were abolished, although the name "states" was retained. In the third article, districts, cities, or towns that had been separated from the states and divisions to which they belonged were returned to their original conditions. This excluded Aguascalientes, which continued to be considered a district of Zacatecas. In a statement by the Ministry of War, on September 21, 1853, it was decided that states would instead be called "departments". Changes in the territorial division, according to the code above, were established according to several decrees:

1. May 29, 1853, establishing the Tehuantepec Territory, its capital city at Minatitlan
2. October 16, 1853, establishing the Isla del Carmen Territory
3. December 1, 1853, establishing the Sierra Gorda Territory, its capital city at San Luis de la Paz
4. December 1, 1853, adding Tuxpan District to the Veracruz Department
5. December 10, 1853, redesignating Aguascalientes District as Aguascalientes Department
6. February 16, 1854, created, despite the centralist system, a kind of Federal District
7. July 20, 1854, approving the Treaty of Mesilla, which amended the border with the United States of America through the loss of territory of Chihuahua and Sonora.

=== Plan of Ayutla ===
The Plan of Ayutla was a political statement proclaimed on March 1, 1854, in Ayutla, Guerrero, and was intended to end the presidency of Antonio López de Santa Anna. The plan was revised in Acapulco on 11 March 1854, by changing its second article to respect, in principle, the territorial division and to create a representative from each department and territory.

The Provisional Organic Statute (known as the Lafragua Code) was promulgated on May 15, 1856. It provided the legal basis for governing the country in the period between the Plan of Ayutla and Federal Constitution of the United Mexican States of 1857. That document left open a later choice for federalism or centralism, but encouraged federalism because it called the entities that formed the Republic States. Thus, in its 2nd article, it retained the previous territorial division, and determined the existence of 22 states, the District of the capital, and 6 territories.

The Constitution of 1857 was drafted during the presidency of Ignacio Comonfort, who was sworn in on February 5, 1857. The Constitution contained the essence of the 1824 document (i.e., the federal character of the state and the democratic system of representative and republican government), but established freedom of religion and ended the domain of the Catholic Church as the sole and official religion of the country. It set out, in Article 43, the parties making up the federation – 24 states, 1 federal territory, and the Federal District known as the Valley of Mexico (today Mexico City). The territories of Sierra Gorda, Tehuantepec, and Isla del Carmen, and Nuevo León as an independent state, disappeared (Nuevo León was later restored).
