= List of Mexican states by date of statehood =

The 31 states of the United Mexican States.

This is a list of Mexican states by date of statehood, that is, the date when each state was accepted by Congress of the Union as a free and sovereign state of the United Mexican States.

== Background ==
The effective independence of Mexico reached on September 27, 1821, does not meant the independence of the states, because Mexico was the only Latin American country which became independent from Spain as a monarchy. After the fall of the Mexican Empire, the Federal Republic was established on July 12, 1823.

Although 18 of the 19 founder states can be considered official members of the federation since the enactment of the Constitutive Act of the Mexican Federation on January 31, 1824; eleven of them were ratified as states before the enactment and some of the others were included as three states (the internal States of North, Western and Eastern).^{6} ^{7} Tamaulipas, Tabasco and Chiapas were ratified after the enactment of the act.^{8}

All the later admission dates were set by law or decree of congress, except for Chiapas, whose admission was determined by its own people in a referendum.

== List ==
This list does not account the secession of several states during the establishment of the Centralist Republic and the territorial changes made during the civil and foreign wars.

#	State		Admission^{1}	Preceding Entity^{2}
1	Mexico	México	December 20, 1823	Intendancy of México, then Province of México
2		Guanajuato	December 20, 1823	Intendancy of Guanajuato, then Province of Guanajuato
3		Oaxaca	December 21, 1823	Intendancy of Oaxaca, then Province of Oaxaca
4		Puebla	December 21, 1823	Intendancy of Puebla, then Province of Puebla de los Angeles
5	Michoacan	Michoacán	December 22, 1823	Intendancy of Valladolid, then Province of Valladolid
6	San Luis Potosi	San Luis Potosí	December 22, 1823	Intendancy of San Luis Potosí, then San Luis Potosí
7		Veracruz	December 22, 1823	Intendancy of Veracruz, then Province of Veracruz
8	Yucatan	Yucatán^{3}	December 23, 1823	Captaincy General of Yucatán, Intendancy of Yucatán, Province of Mérida de Yucatán and then Republic of Yucatán
9		Jalisco	December 23, 1823	Nueva Galicia, Intendancy of Guadalajara, Province of Guadalajara
10		Zacatecas	December 23, 1823	Nueva Galicia, Intendancy of los Zacatecas, Province of Zacatecas
11	Queretaro	Querétaro	December 23, 1823	Intendancy of México, then Province of Querétaro
12	Sonora	Sonora^{4}	January 10, 1824	Nueva Navarra, Province of Sonora
13		Tabasco	February 7, 1824	Split off from Veracruz and Yucatán
14		Tamaulipas	February 7, 1824	Nuevo Santander, then Province of Santander
15	Nuevo Leon	Nuevo León	May 7, 1824	New Kingdom of León, then Province of New Kingdom of León
16	Coahuila	Coahuila^{5}	May 7, 1824	Nueva Extremadura, then Province of Coahuila
17		Durango	May 22, 1824	Nueva Vizcaya, then Province of Nueva Vizcaya
18		Chihuahua	July 6, 1824	Nueva Vizcaya, then Province of Nueva Vizcaya
19		Chiapas	September 14, 1824	Captaincy General of Guatemala, then Province of Guatemala
20		Sinaloa	October 14, 1830	Split off from Estado de Occidente
21		Guerrero	October 27, 1849	Formed from parts of México, Puebla and Michoacán
22		Tlaxcala	December 9, 1856	Territory of Tlaxcala
23		Colima	December 9, 1856	Territory of Colima
24		Aguascalientes	February 5, 1857	Territory of Aguascalientes
25		Campeche	April 29, 1863	Territory of Campeche, split off from Yucatán
26		Hidalgo	January 16, 1869	Split off from México
27		Morelos	April 17, 1869	Split off from México
28		Nayarit	January 26, 1917	Territory of Tepic
29		Baja California	January 16, 1952	North Territory of Baja California
30		Quintana Roo	October 8, 1974	Territory of Quintana Roo, split off from Yucatán
31		Baja California Sur	October 8, 1974	South Territory of Baja California

== Notes ==
1. The order of the states admitted the same day was determined by the day of the installation of its congress.
2. The intendancies were created in 1776 under the Viceroyalty of New Spain. The provinces were created as part of the territorial administration of the Mexican Empire.
3. Yucatán joined to the federation as the Federated Republic of Yucatán (Spanish: República Federada de Yucatán).
4. Sonora joined to the federation along with Sinaloa as Estado de Occidente, also recognized as Sonora y Sinaloa.
5. Coahuila joined to the federation along with Texas as Coahuila y Tejas.
6. Estado Interno del Norte (north) was formed with Durango, Chihuahua and Nuevo México. Estado Interno de Oriente (eastern) was formed with Coahuila, Nuevo León and Texas. Estado Interno de Occidente (western) was formed with Sonora y Sinaloa. Only the Western State was finally ratified in the Constitution of 1824 and the other two states were divided in different states and federal territories.
7. The Mexican Federation was finally composed of 19 states, the Federal District and the federal territories of Alta California, Baja California, Santa Fe de Nuevo México, Colima and Tlaxcala.
8. Tamaulipas and Tabasco were included in the act as a state, but congress ratified its admission on February 7.

== See also ==
- Ranked list of Mexican states
- List of states of Mexico
- Territorial evolution of Mexico
