= Antonio Rivas Mercado =

Mexican architect and engineer

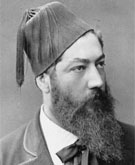
- Born: 26 February 1853; Tepic Territory, Mexico
- Died: 3 January 1927 (aged 73); Mexico City, Mexico
- Occupation: Architect
- Spouse: Matilde Castellanos Haaf
- Children: María Emilia Rivas Mercado; Alicia Rivas Mercado; Antonio Rivas Mercado; Antonieta Rivas Mercado; Mario Rivas Mercado Castellanos; Amelia Rivas Mercado
- Buildings: Teatro Juárez
- Projects: Monumento a la Independencia

Antonio Rivas Mercado (26 February 1853 – 3 January 1927) was a Mexican architect, engineer and restorer. He is considered the preeminent Mexican architect of the late 19th century and early 20th century. His most famous project was the design of the Independence Column in downtown Mexico City. He was the director of the Academy of San Carlos from 1903 to 1912.

== Early life and education ==
Rivas Mercado was born in Tepic in the then Territory of Tepic, on 26 February 1853. His parents decided to send him to study in Europe at the age of 10. Eventually, he studied Fine Arts and Architecture at the École des Beaux-Arts in Paris.

== Career ==
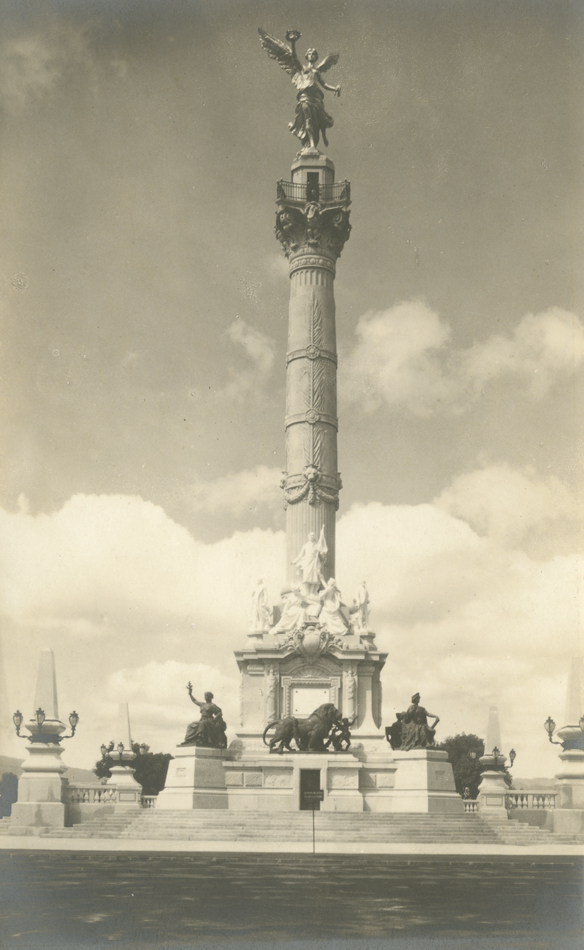
Monumento a la Independencia, Mexico City (1910)

Rivas Mercado returned to Mexico City in 1879 to practise as an architect and teach at the Schools of Engineering and Architecture (today part of the National Autonomous University of Mexico).

Among Rivas Mercado's various projects figure the house that eventually became the Wax Museum of Mexico City; the restoration of haciendas of historical importance such as the Hacienda of Tecajete in the State of Hidalgo, and Chapingo in the State of Mexico; the customs building in Tlatelolco; the restoration of several government buildings including the facade of the Town Hall in Mexico City; and his own house in Mexico City, now preserved as a historical building.

The Teatro Juárez in Guanajuato began construction in 1873 under architect José Noriega. Following construction interruptions, the project was taken up by Rivas Mercado and Alberto Malo in 1893. Previously a purely Neoclassical project, it gained an Eclectic style under the new architects. The Neoclassical exterior and Moorish Revival and Art Nouveau interiors are a clear reflection of Rivas Mercado's eclectic architectural style.

In 1902 he was commissioned by President Porfirio Díaz to design and build the Independence Column on occasion of the 100th anniversary of the beginning of the Mexican War of Independence. The project, which he realised in collaboration with sculptor Enrique Alciati, was finished in 1910, the same year as the anniversary.

Between 1884 and 1910, Rivas Mercado was a Federal Deputy representing Guanajuato.

Rivas Mercado was Director of the Escuela Nacional de Bellas Artes in Mexico City from 1903 to 1912. He instituted new methods of study and design and is said to have modified the curriculum of the "Architecture and Civil Engineering" major in order to make two different ones out of it. During his tenure he funded Diego Rivera's scholarship to study painting in Europe.

President Venustiano Carranza commissioned Rivas Mercado to renovate the Military Academy annex of Chapultepec Castle to better accommodate a presidential residence. Shortly after his work on Chapultepec Castle, he moved back to Paris. However, he returned to Mexico in 1926 and died a few months later in Mexico City, aged 74.

=== Gallery of projects ===
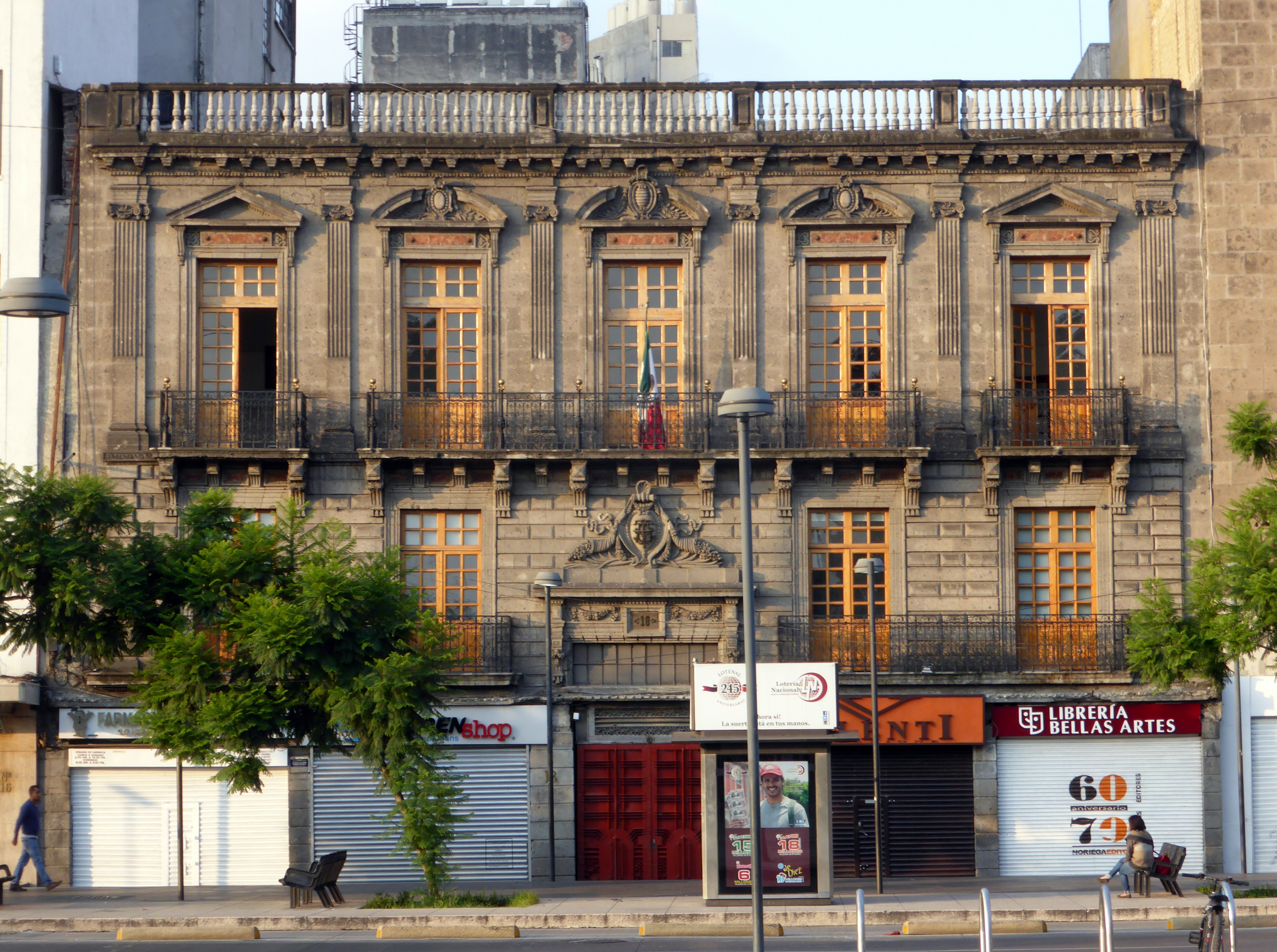
Torres Adalide House,
Mexico City (1884)

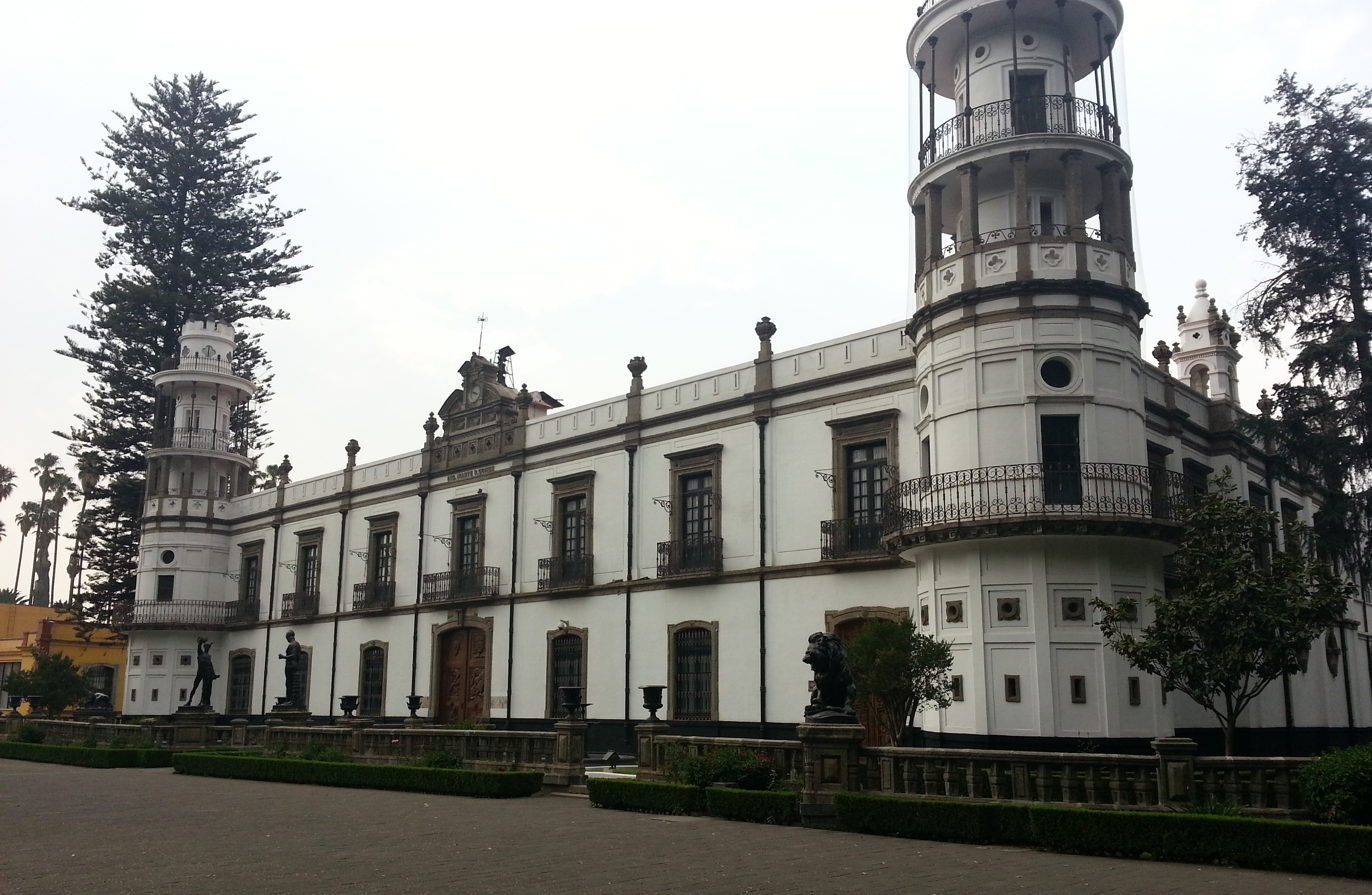
Renovation of the Hacienda de Chapingo (now the Chapingo Autonomous University),
Texcoco (1896)

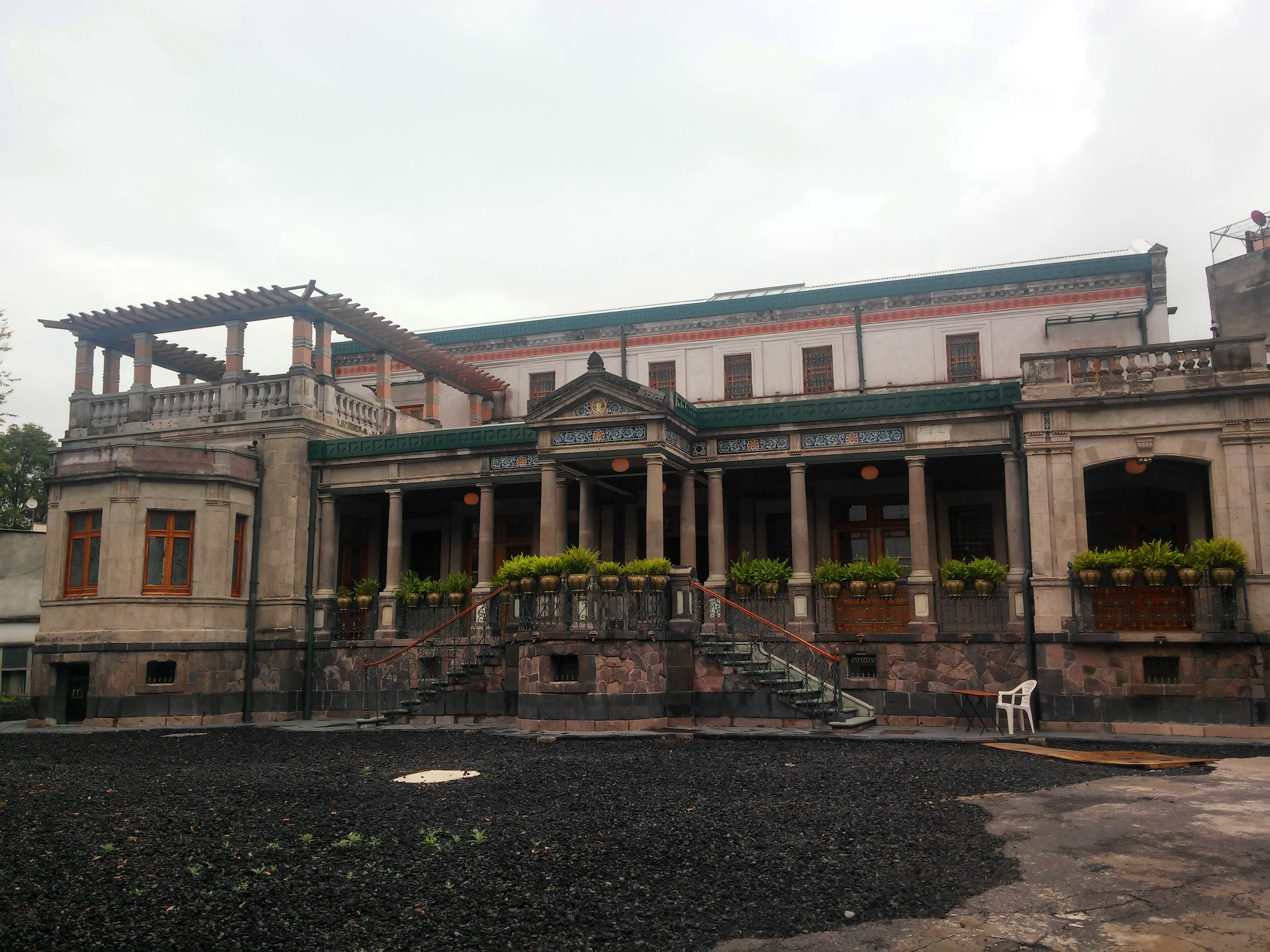
Rivas Mercado House
(now an architecture museum),
Mexico City (1897)

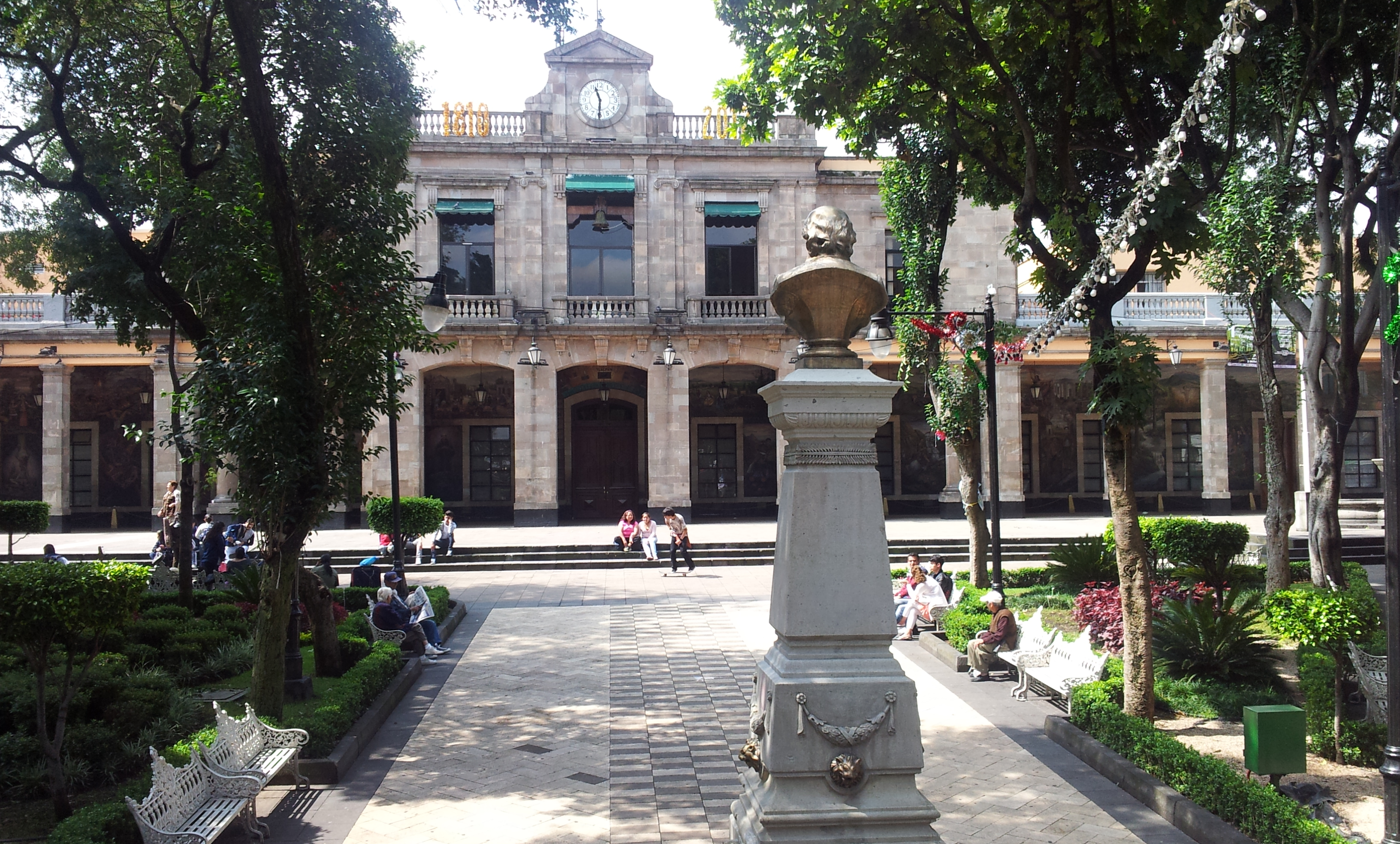
Tlalpan Municipal Palace,
Mexico City (1902)

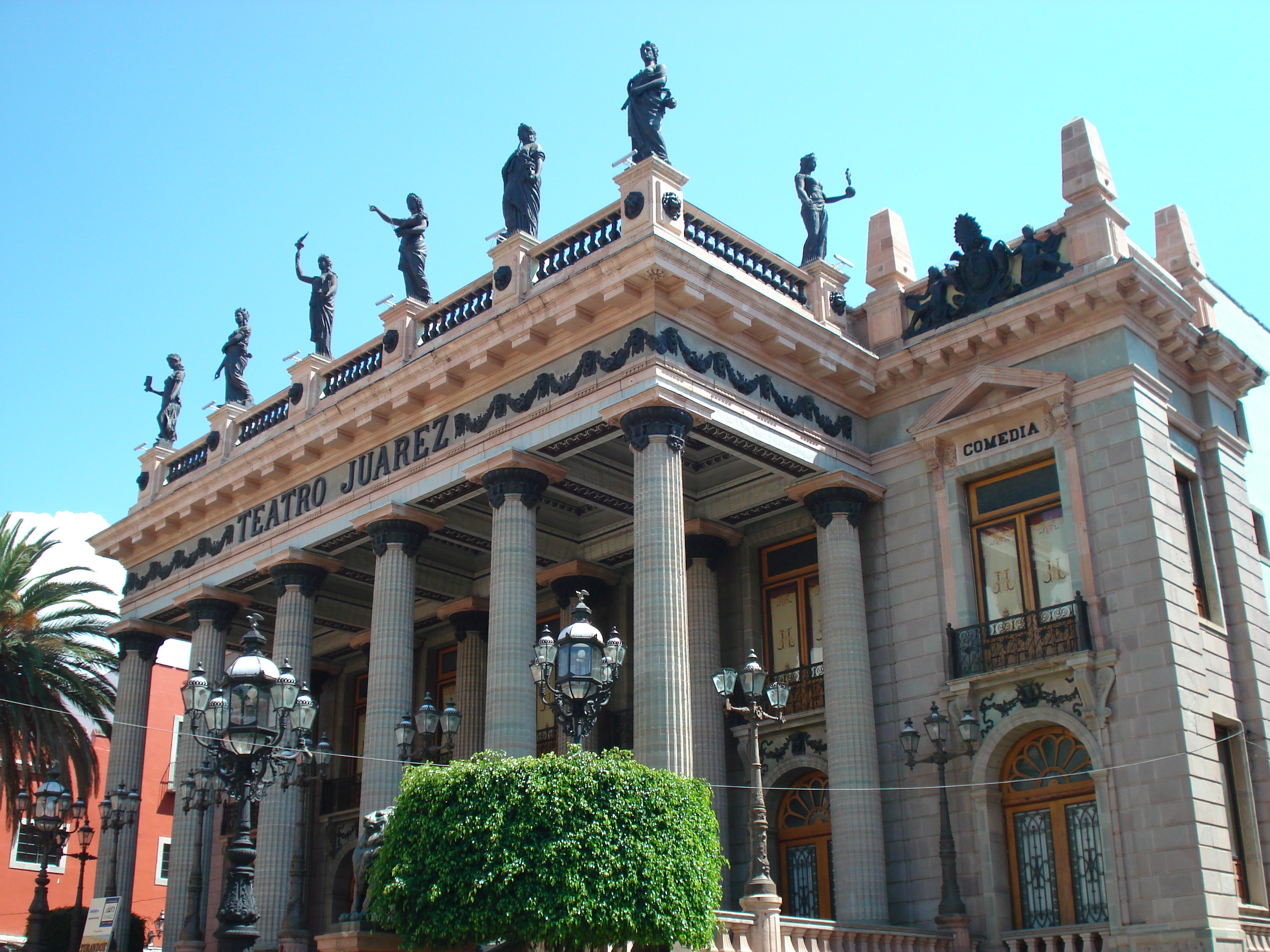
Portico and interiors of the
Teatro Juárez,
Guanajuato City (1903)

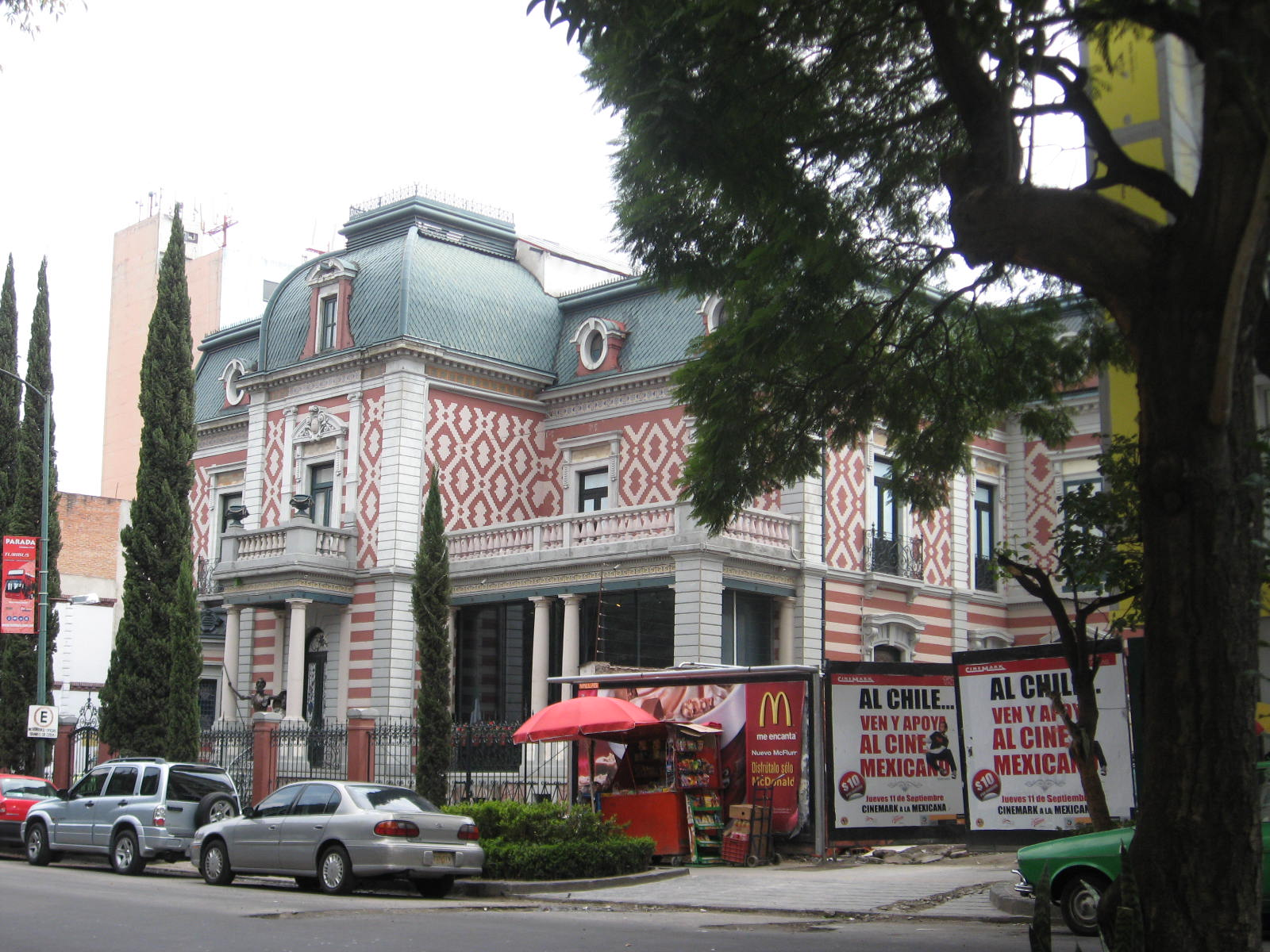
Macías Casterona House (currently the Wax Museum),
Mexico City (1904)

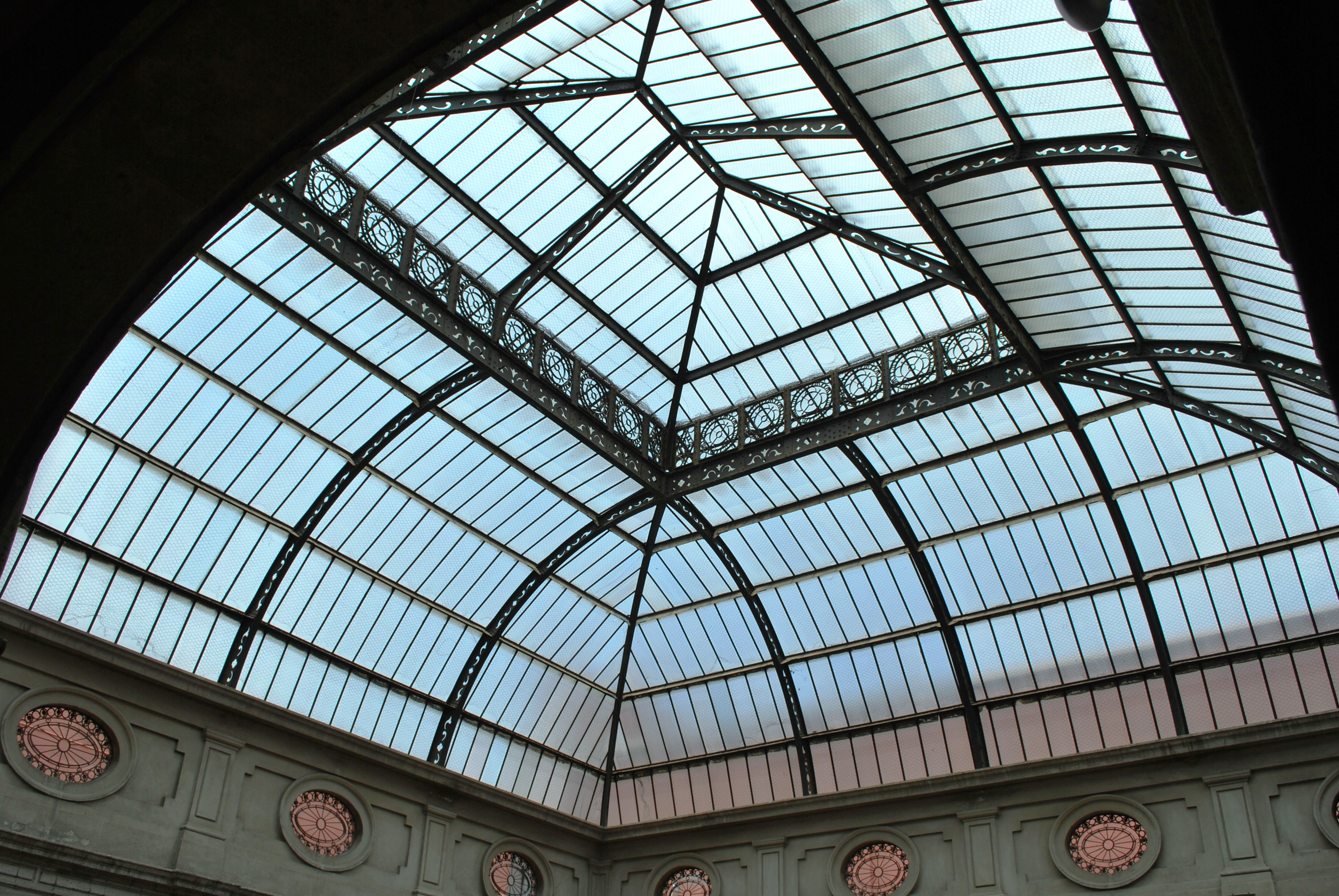
Roof of the Academy of San Carlos,
Mexico City (1913)

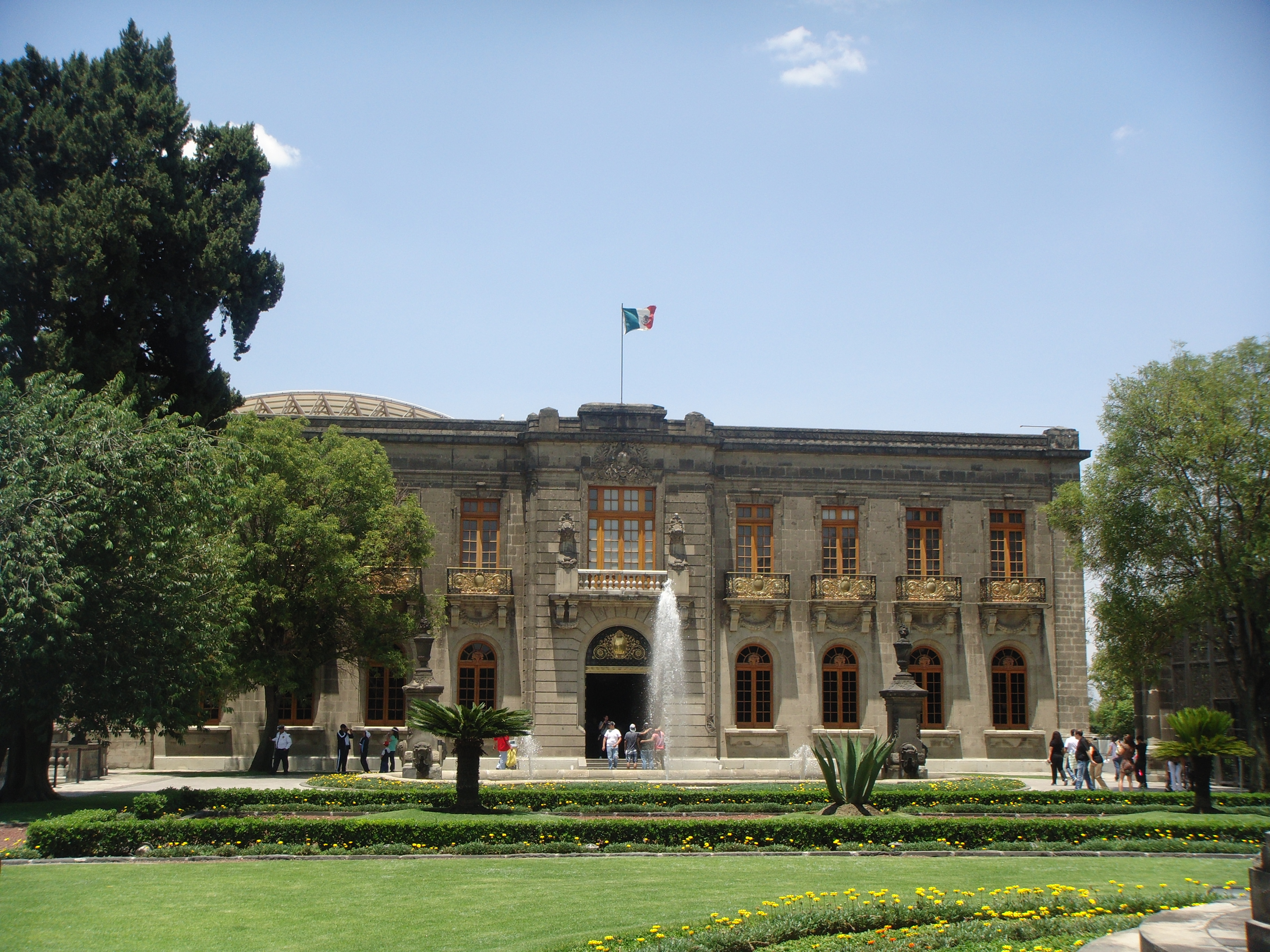
West façade and interiors of Chapultepec Castle,
Mexico City (1920)

== Personal life ==
He was the father of Antonieta Rivas Mercado.

On 26 February 2019, Google celebrated what would have been Mercado's 166th birthday with a Google doodle.

== See also ==
- Architecture of Mexico
- Científico
