= Tlaxcala (disambiguation) =

Tlaxcala is a Mexican state.

Tlaxcala may also refer to:

- Tlaxcala (city), the capital city of the Mexican state of Tlaxcala and seat of the municipality
  - Tlaxcala Municipality
- Tlaxcala Territory 1824–1857
- Tlaxcala (Nahua state), the pre-Columbian city and state

== See also ==
- Tlaxcaltec, a Nahua people who live in the Mexican state of Tlaxcala
- San Esteban de Nueva Tlaxcala, a Tlaxcalan municipality in what is now the Mexican state of Coahuila
