= Carmen Territory =

Mexican federal territory (1853–1857)

Carmen Territory Territorio del Carmen
- Territory of Mexico
- 1853–1857
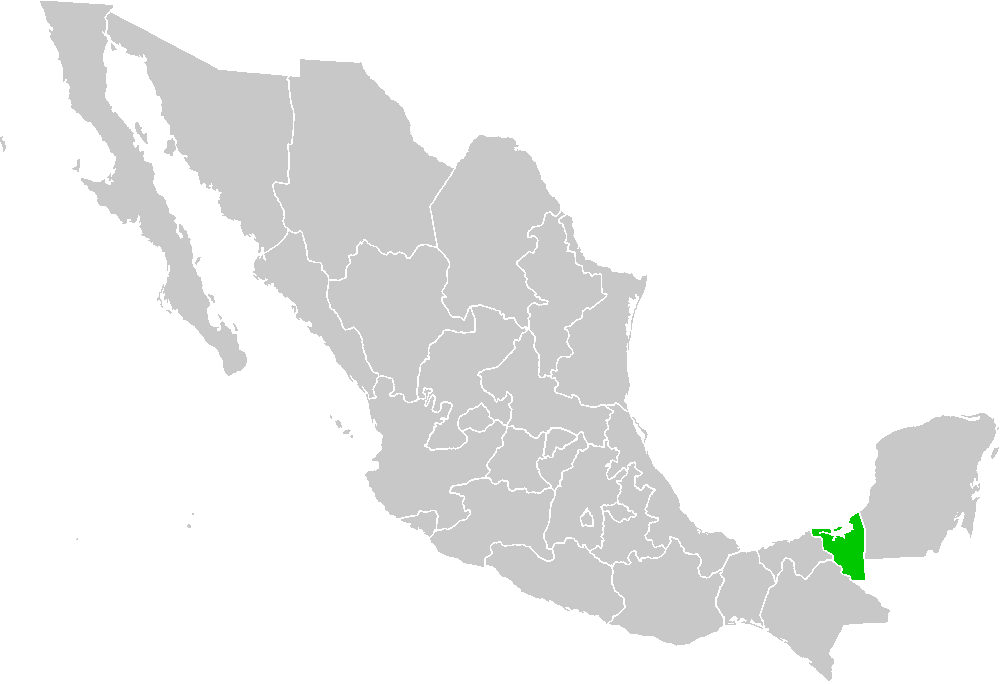
- Location of the Carmen Territory (green) in Mexico.
- Capital: Villa del Carmen
- Area
  - Total: 20,000 km^{2} (7,700 sq mi)
  - Type: Territory of Mexico
- History
  - Established: 23 November 1853
  - Dissolution: 16 September 1857
Preceded by	Succeeded by
Tabasco; Yucatán	Tabasco; Campeche Territory

The Carmen Territory (Spanish: Territorio del Carmen) was a federal territory of Mexico that existed between 1853 and 1857.

== History ==
The territory was established by President Antonio López de Santa Anna and consisted of Isla del Carmen off the west coast of the Yucatán Peninsula and the surrounding area. The state of Yucatán had to cede part of its land to form the territory. The creation of the territory was primarily motivated by a desire to diminish the political power of Yucatán, as evidenced by the two independence movements in this region in previous decades.

With the proclamation of the Constitution of 1857, two years after the fall of Santa Anna, the territory was dissolved. It was divided between the state of Tabasco and the newly created territory of Campeche and Isla del Carmen.
