= Tepic (disambiguation) =

Tepic is the capital and largest city of the western Mexican state of Nayarit.

Tepic may also refer to:

- Tepic Territory, a former federal territory of Mexico 1884–1917, became the state of Nayarit
- Tepic Municipality, a municipality in the Mexican state of Nayarit
- Milenko Tepić (born 1987), Serbian professional basketball player
