= Campeche Territory =

Mexican federal territory (1858–1862)

Territory of Campeche and Isla del Carmen Territorio de Campeche e Isla del Carmen
- Territory of Mexico
- 1858–1862
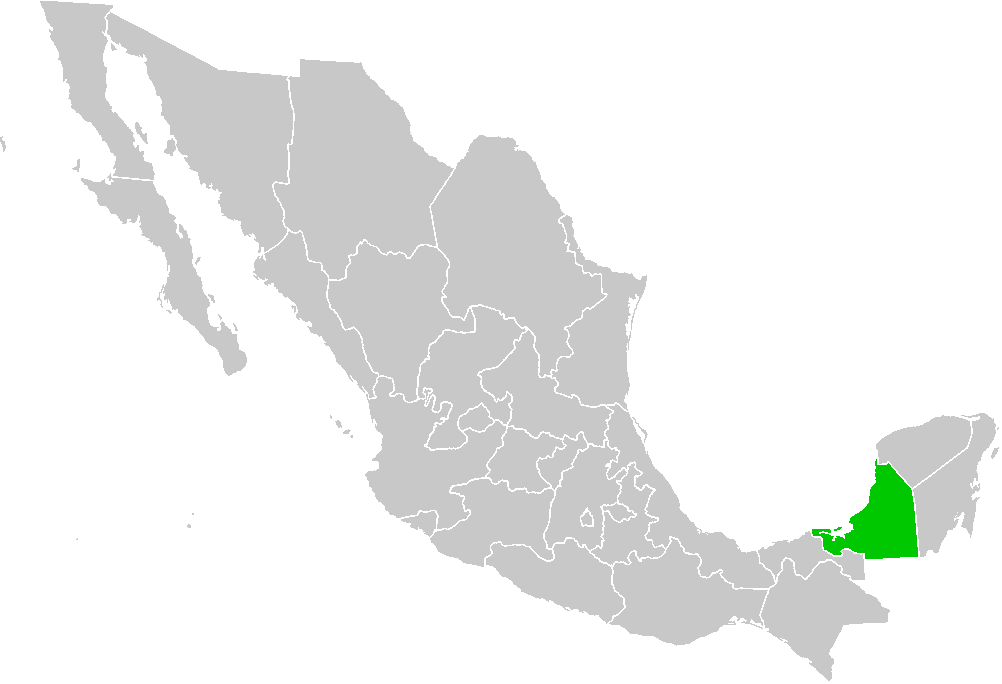
- Location of the Territory of Campeche and Isla del Carmen (green) in Mexico.
- Capital: San Francisco de Campeche
  - Type: Territory of Mexico
- History
  - Established: 3 May 1858
  - Dissolution: 19 February 1862
Preceded by	Succeeded by
Carmen Territory	Campeche

The Campeche Territory, officially the Territory of Campeche and Isla del Carmen (Spanish: Territorio de Campeche e Isla del Carmen) was a federal territory of Mexico that existed between 1858 and 1862.

== History ==
The territory was established by President Félix Zuloaga who, wanting to appease secessionist sentiments and resolve part of the problem caused by the Caste War that covered the Yucatán Peninsula, decreed its creation on 29 January 1858, consisting of the districts of Campeche and Isla del Carmen. However, this was ratified only on 3 May of the same year.

On 18 May 1858, the Governing Board of Campeche and Isla del Carmen was formed, which recorded in an act the desire to become a state of Mexico. This was fulfilled on 19 February 1862, although it was only recognized as such by the other federal entities on 29 April 1863.
