= Teatro Juárez =

Historic theater in Guanajuato, Mexico

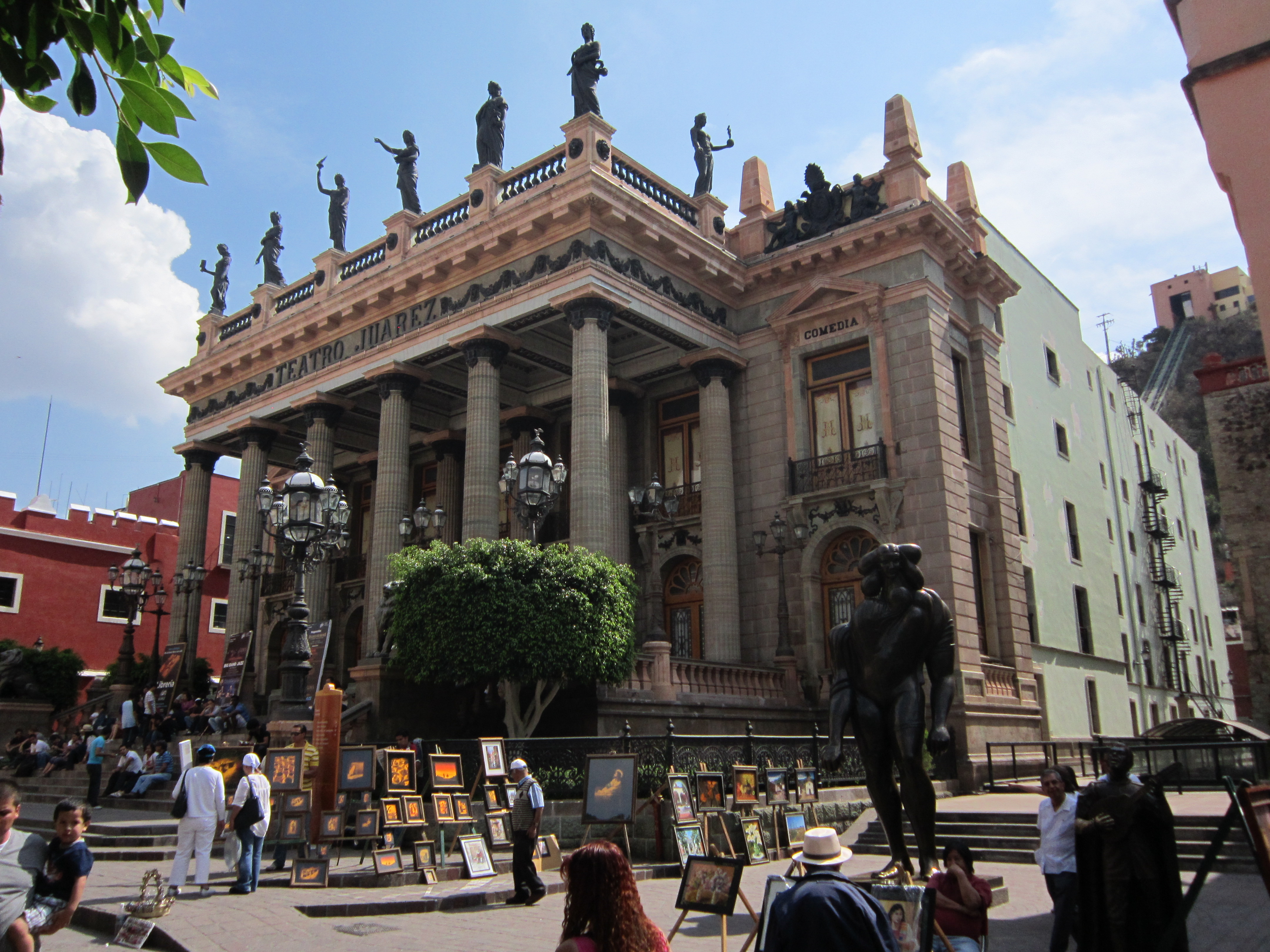
- Interactive map of Teatro Juárez
- Address: Plazuela de Cata No. 1 Guanajuato; Mexico
- Coordinates: 21°0′56.44″N 101°15′10.47″W
- Owner: City of Guanajuato
- Capacity: 902
- Current use: Music, theater and dance performance

Construction
- Opened: 27 October 1903
- Architects: José Noriega (original design), Antonio Rivas Mercado y Alberto Malo (finished construction)

The Teatro Juárez is a historical 19th century theater located in the Mexican city of Guanajuato. It was built from 1872 to 1903 from a design by architect José Noriega and by order of General Florencio Antillón. The building was completed by architect Antonio Rivas Mercado and engineer Alberto Malo, who implemented refurbishments that significantly changed the exterior and interior aspect.

The peak of its popularity was towards the end of the 19th century until the start of the Mexican Revolution, being an important center of artistic activity where the most famous artist of the time appeared.

The Teatro Juárez has been the main venue of the Festival Internacional Cervantino since 1972.

== History ==
The Teatro Juarez was built on lands formerly occupied by the Emporio Hotel, demolished in 1872, and before that by the San Diego de Alcalá convent of the Discalced Franciscan monks, demolished in 1861. Construction of the theater started in 1873.

The original design of the portico by architect José María Noriega was later modified by Antonio Rivas Mercado.

It was inaugurated on October 27, 1903, by president Porfirio Díaz. The opening performance was Verdi's Aída, presented by the company of Italian impresario Ettore Drog, and directed by Giorgio Polacco and Napoleón Sieni.

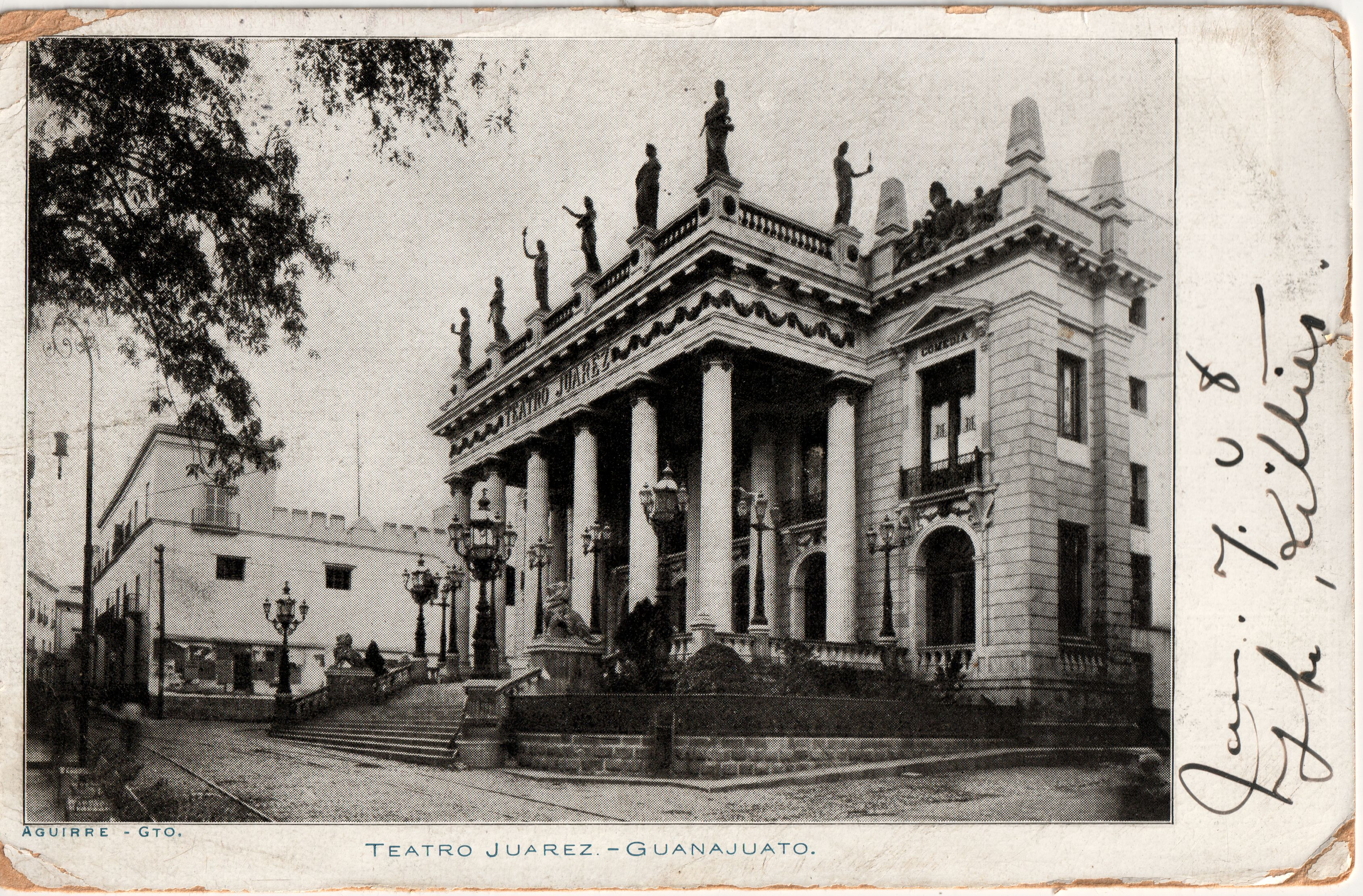
The theater in about 1907

== Architecture ==
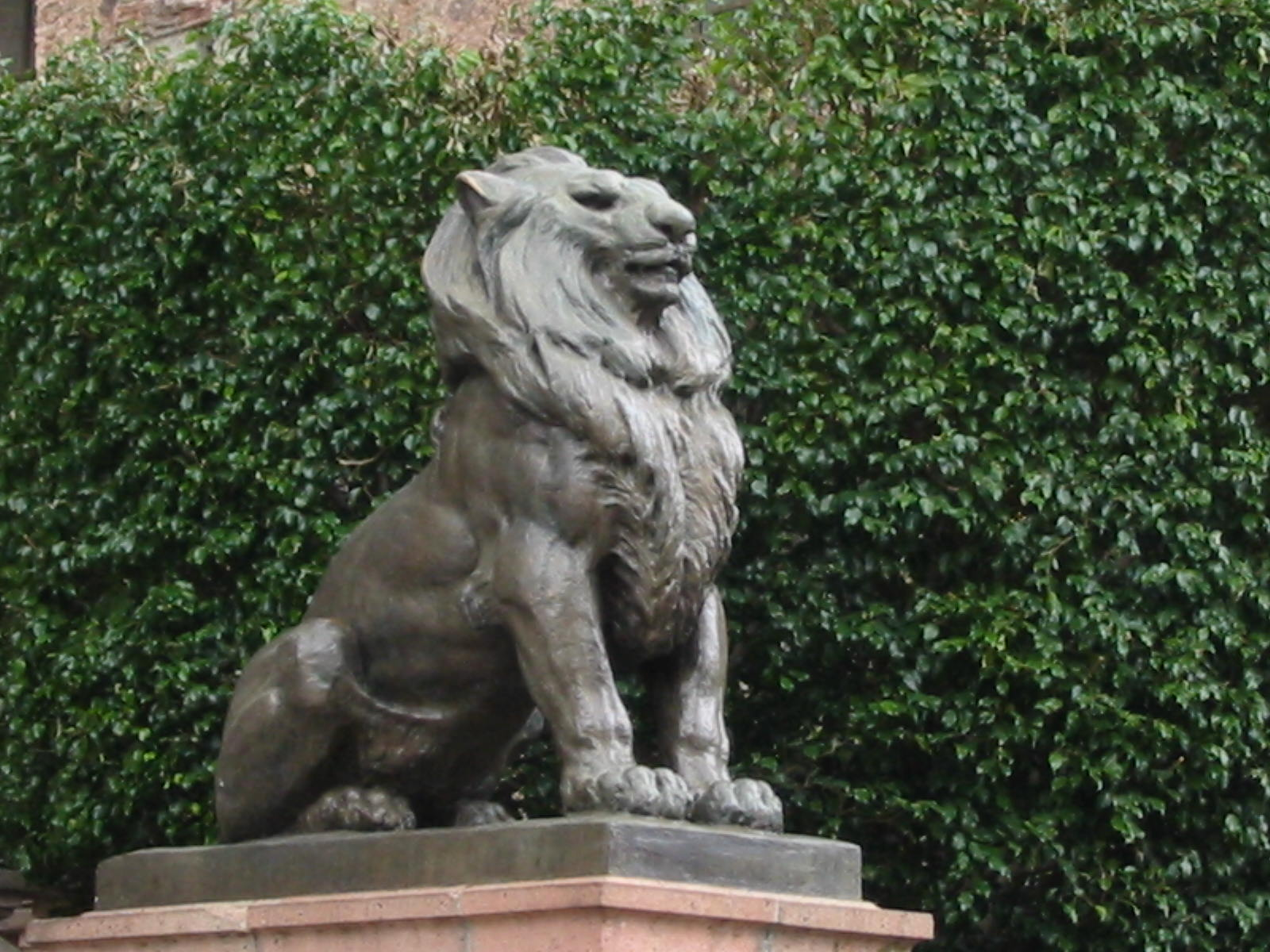
Bronze lion next to the entrance.

The theater is a notable example of Mexican Neoclassical architecture from the nineteenth century, but also presents eclectic elements such as the classic Doric columns and the Oriental style of the interior design. The entrance features several lampposts in front of a staircase and flanked by two bronze statues of lions by sculptor Jesús Fructuoso Contreras.

Bronze statues of the classical muses are installed on the roof above the entrance. The statues are 3.5m high and were ordered from Ohio. Due to a long delay in delivery, it was decided to install only eight of the nine muses, although the missing one, Erato, might be represented in Urania's globe.

== Performances and events ==
In October 1999 the world premiere of the final version of the opera The Visitors by Carlos Chávez took place in the Teatro Juárez during the Festival Cervantino. Conducted by José Areán with stage direction by Sergio Vela, the opera was performed with its original English libretto and its final title.

== See also ==
- List of buildings in Guanajuato City
