= Antonieta =

- Theatrical release poster
- Directed by: Carlos Saura
- Written by: Jean-Claude Carrière; Carlos Saura
- Produced by: Pablo Buelna
- Starring: Isabelle Adjani; Hanna Schygulla
- Cinematography: Teodoro Escamilla
- Edited by: Pablo González del Amo
- Music by: José Antonio Zavala
- Distributed by: Gaumont Distribution
- Release dates: 21 October 1982 (Spain); 11 November 1982 (Mexico); 26 January 1983 (France)
- Running time: 108 minutes
- Countries: France; Mexico; Spain
- Language: Spanish
- Box office: Pts 38,274,776

Antonieta is a 1982 film by Spanish director Carlos Saura, starring Isabelle Adjani and Hanna Schygulla. The film, a Mexican-Spanish French co production, was based on a novel by Andrés Henestrosa. The plot centers on the life of Antonieta Rivas Mercado, a Mexican writer who killed herself inside Paris' Notre Dame in 1931.

== Plot ==
Anna, a modern day Parisian psychologist, is researching the cases of women who committed suicide in the 20th Century. She becomes fascinated by the story of Antonieta Rivas Mercado, a Mexican writer and social activist who committed suicide inside Notre Dame Cathedral in Paris. To find more about Antonieta's story, Anna travels to Mexico and interviews people who knew her. She receives her first clues about Antonieta's life from Juana, a Mexican librarian who frames the life of Antonieta Rivas Mercado within a stormy period of Mexico's history, the political turmoil of the 1910s-1920s.

Antonieta's personal life was as dark and dramatic as that of her era. She was the daughter of a famous architect and as a child she posed for the golden angel atop the famous Column of Independence in Mexico City.

Vargas, a poet, now a middle-aged man, recounts for Ana the life of Antonieta when he met her and they were friends. The story moves back and forth between present and past.

As a young woman, Antonieta married but later left her husband and fell madly in love with the painter Manuel Rodríguez Lozano. The painter was married and Antonieta's feelings remained unrequited because Manuel was homosexual. Their Platonic relationship lasted for several years during which she wrote him many love letters, later published in a book.

Leon, a Mexican historian, further illustrates Antonieta's life for Anna. Still in love with the painter, Antonieta meets José Vasconcelos, a Mexican intellectual who is running for President of the country on the platform of offering education to the masses. Antonieta, is drawn to the idealistic politician, becoming Vasconcelos' lover and closest advisor.

After Vasconcelos is politically defeated, she accompanies him in exile to Paris. They have lost their political idealism. She begs him to tell her if he still needs her. He replies that, really no one needs anyone, only God. Antonieta commits her last dramatic act, by pressing a pistol to her heart in the pews of Notre Dame.

== Cast ==
- Isabelle Adjani - Antonieta Rivas Mercado
- Hanna Schygulla - Anna
- Ignacio López Tarso - Vargas
- Carlos Bracho - José Vasconcelos
- Gonzalo Vega - Manuel Rodríguez Lozano
- Héctor Alterio - León
- Diana Bracho - Juana

== Production ==
Antonieta was originally a project of the director and editor Rafael Castanedo, who had the Mexican actress Diana Bracho in mind for the role of Antonieta Rivas Mercado. The project was delayed because Castanedo was unable to find financing to make the film. Margarita López Portillo, the director of Radio, Televisión y Cinematografía, took over the project reshaping it as a co-production with Spain inviting renowned Spanish director Carlos Saura to direct the film. German actress Hanna Shygulla was cast as the journalist investigating Antonieta's suicide. Jean-Claude Carriere, Luis Buñuel's script writer, was assigned the adaptation of the story. Diana Bracho was still in the project, but López Portillo decided to cast Isabelle Adjani in the leading role. Diana Bracho was given a small role instead.

== DVD release ==
Antonieta was released on DVD on October 11, 2005 by Vanguard Cinema.
