= Antonieta Rivas Mercado =

Mexican writer and feminist (1900–1931)

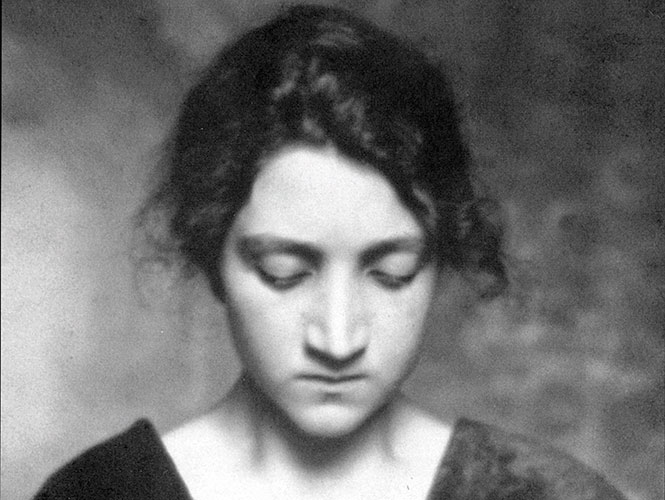
- Born: April 28, 1900; Mexico City, Mexico
- Died: February 11, 1931 (aged 30); Paris, French Third Republic
- Spouse: Albert Edward Blair (m. 1918)
- Children: Donald Antonio Blair (1919–2011)
- Parent(s): Antonio Rivas Mercado (father); Cristina Matilde Castellanos Haff (mother)

María Antonieta Rivas Mercado Castellanos (April 28, 1900 – February 11, 1931) was a Mexican intellectual, writer, feminist, and arts patron.

== Biography ==
Rivas Mercado was born as the second of four children (Alicia, Antonieta, Mario, and Amelia) of the notable architect Antonio Rivas Mercado and his wife Cristina Matilde Castellanos Haff. Around 1910, during the Mexican Revolution, her parents separated, and her mother moved together with Antonieta's older sister Alice to Paris, where they stayed until their return to Mexico in 1915.

Antonio Rivas Mercado refused to let his wife move back into the family's house, as a result of which Antonieta had to assume more responsibility at home. With her father's permission, at the age of 18, she married British-born, American-raised engineer Albert Edward Blair, and gave birth to their son Donald Antonio (Tonito) on September 9, 1919. During the time the young family lived in a ranch in the state of Durango, there were periods when Antonieta Rivas sought separation from Blair, but he did not consent, as a result of which she was sometimes depressed.

Rivas Mercado eventually moved to Mexico City and unsuccessfully tried to file for divorce, and to obtain support for her son. In 1927, her father died, and Antonieta became responsible for the care of her parents' house and her siblings. She financed and promoted cultural projects of considerable relevance; for example, she financed and became principally involved in the foundation of the Teatro Ulises, that broke with commercial theater in the Mexico of the time. Thanks to her encouragement, literary lounges were formed, and the Orquesta Sinfónica of Mexico City was formed. It was said that knowing Antonieta Rivas Mercado helped open the cultural doors in Mexico.

Rivas Mercado wrote for the magazine Los Contemporáneos and the Spanish periodical El Sol. She fell hopelessly in love with her friend, the painter Manuel Rodríguez Lozano, an affection that was not reciprocated. In 1929, she had an affair with the politician José Vasconcelos, and later supported his electoral campaign. However, this love affair also proved to be fruitless, since Vasconcelos was married. In 1931, Antonieta followed Vasconcelos to Paris and, when rejected, shot herself at the altar of Notre Dame de Paris.

== Cultural depictions ==
In 1982, she was portrayed by Isabelle Adjani in Antonieta, which was directed Carlos Saura.

In November 2010, to celebrate the bicentennial of the Mexican Independence, the opera Antonieta by Mexican composer Federico Ibarra, was presented at the Teatro Flores Canelo, Centro Nacional de las Artes in Mexico City. Mexican mezzo-soprano Lidya Rendón starred as Antonieta, in a staging by Antonio Morales and Rosa Blanes Rex, conducted by Enrique Barrios.
