= Morelos Territory =

Mexican territory (1914–1917)

The territory within Mexico.

The Morelos Territory (Spanish: Territorio de Morelos) was a federal territory of Mexico that existed between 1914 and 1917. It was created by the decree of 17 June 1914 issued by the Congress of the United Mexican States which amended articles 43 and 44 of the Constitution of 1857, with the territory the same as the state of Morelos; the decree also created the territories Bravo and Jiménez.

After the promulgation of the new constitution on 5 February 1917, Morelos was elevated back to the status of a state of the federation.
