= Bravo Territory =

Mexican territory (1914–1917)

The Bravo Territory (Spanish: Territorio del Bravo) was a federal territory of Mexico that existed between 1914 and 1917. It was created by the decree of 17 June 1914 issued by the Congress of the United Mexican States which amended articles 43 and 44 of the Constitution of 1857, with the districts of Galeana, Bravos, and a fraction of the district of Iturbide, from the state of Chihuahua; the capital was Ciudad Juárez. The decree also created the territories of Jiménez and Morelos.

With the promulgation of a new constitution on 5 February 1917, the territory was reintegrated into the state of Chihuahua.
