= Colima Territory =

Mexican federal territory (1824–1857)

Colima Territory Territorio de Colima
- Territory of Mexico
- 1824–1857
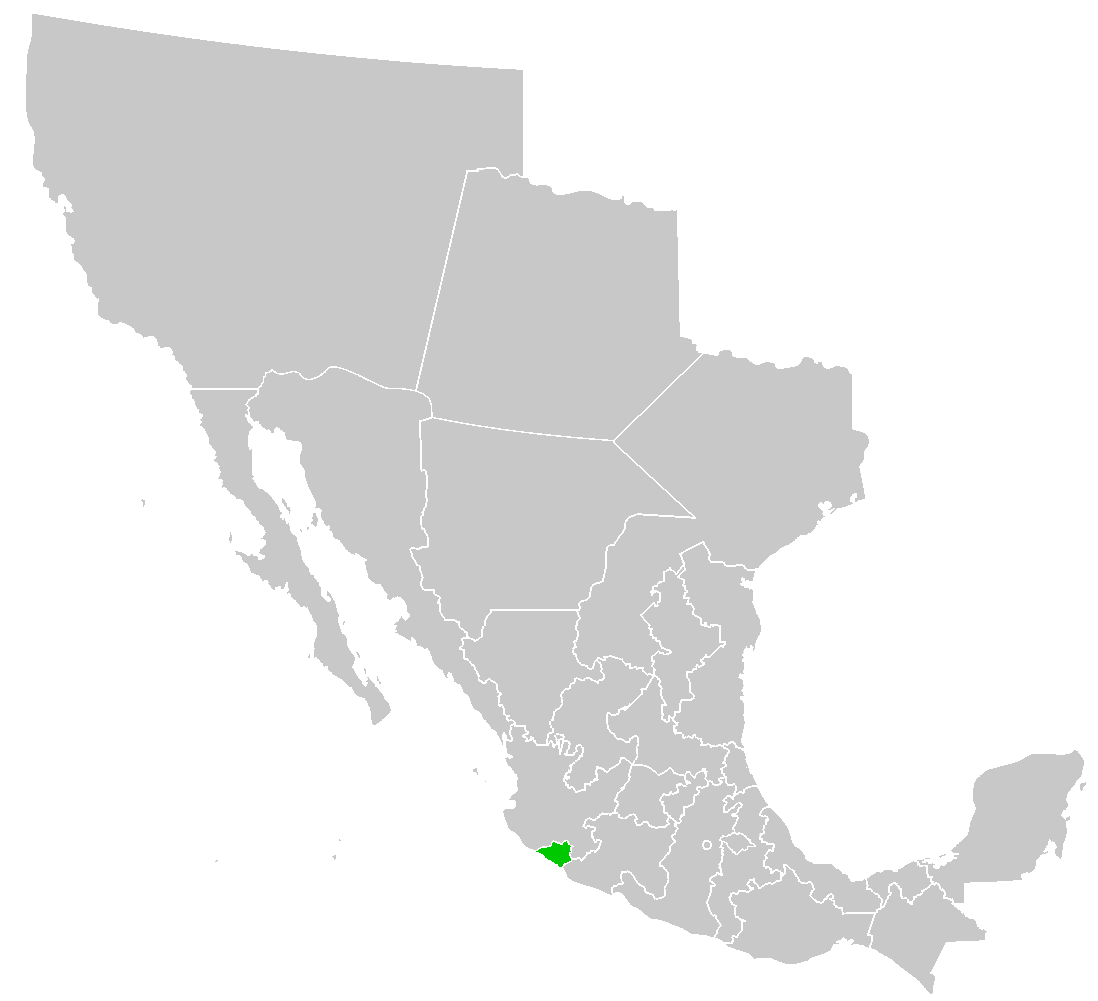
- Location of the Colima Territory (green) in Mexico.
- Capital: Colima
- Government
  - Type: Territory of Mexico
- Territorial governor
  - 1852–1857: Manuel Álvarez Zamora (last)
- History
  - Established: 4 October 1824
  - Statehood: 9 December 1857
Preceded by	Succeeded by
Intendancy of Guadalajara	Colima

The Colima Territory (Spanish: Territorio de Colima) was a federal territory of Mexico that existed between 1824 and 1857, when it was granted statehood within the United Mexican States as Colima.

== History ==
Colima was a part of the Intendancy of Guadalajara (formerly the province of Nueva Galicia) until the Mexican Declaration of Independence in 1821. With the fall of the short-lived First Mexican Empire, the provinces began to draft constitutions to form a federation, the United Mexican States. On 20 June 1823, Colonel Anastacio Brizuela, commander of the 21st division of the Southern Militia, agreed with the city council of the city of Colima and the residents of this town to separate from the Intendancy of Guadalajara. With the promulgation of the First Federal Constitution of Mexico in 1824, Colima received the status of federal territory, thus formally separating from the Intendancy of Guadalajara, which joined the federation as a state with the name of Jalisco. Finally in 1857, with the promulgation of the Second Federal Constitution of Mexico, Colima was integrated as a "free and sovereign state."

== See also ==
- Territorial evolution of Mexico
