= Territories of Mexico =

Former type of political division in Mexico

The territories of Mexico are part of the history of 19th and 20th century independent Mexico. The country created territories (territorios) for areas too lightly populated to be states (estados), or for political reasons.

== List of territories ==
The 1824 Constitution of Mexico defined four territories. Seven others were created later in the 19th and early 20th centuries.

Date	Territory	Change	Legal source
4 October 1824	Alta California Territory	Created	1824 Constitution of Mexico
4 October 1824	Baja California Territory	Created	1824 Constitution of Mexico
4 October 1824	Colima Territory	Created	1824 Constitution of Mexico
4 October 1824	Nuevo México Territory	Created	1824 Constitution of Mexico
24 November 1824	Tlaxcala Territory	Created from parts of Puebla.	
23 May 1835	Aguascalientes Territory	Created from parts of Zacatecas.	
3 May 1858	Campeche Territory	Created from Campeche District of Yucatán.	
12 December 1884	Tepic Territory	Created from parts of Jalisco.	By decree of President Manuel González
16 January 1902	Territory of Quintana Roo	Created from part of Yucatán.	By decree of President Porfirio Díaz
4 July 1914	Bravo Territory	Created from parts of Chihuahua	
4 July 1914	Jiménez Territory	Created from parts of Chihuahua	
4 July 1914	Morelos Territory	Created from Morelos	
30 December 1930	North Territory of Baja California	Created from Baja California Territory	By decree of President Pascual Ortiz Rubio
30 December 1930	South Territory of Baja California	Created from Baja California Territory	By decree of President Pascual Ortiz Rubio

== Maps ==
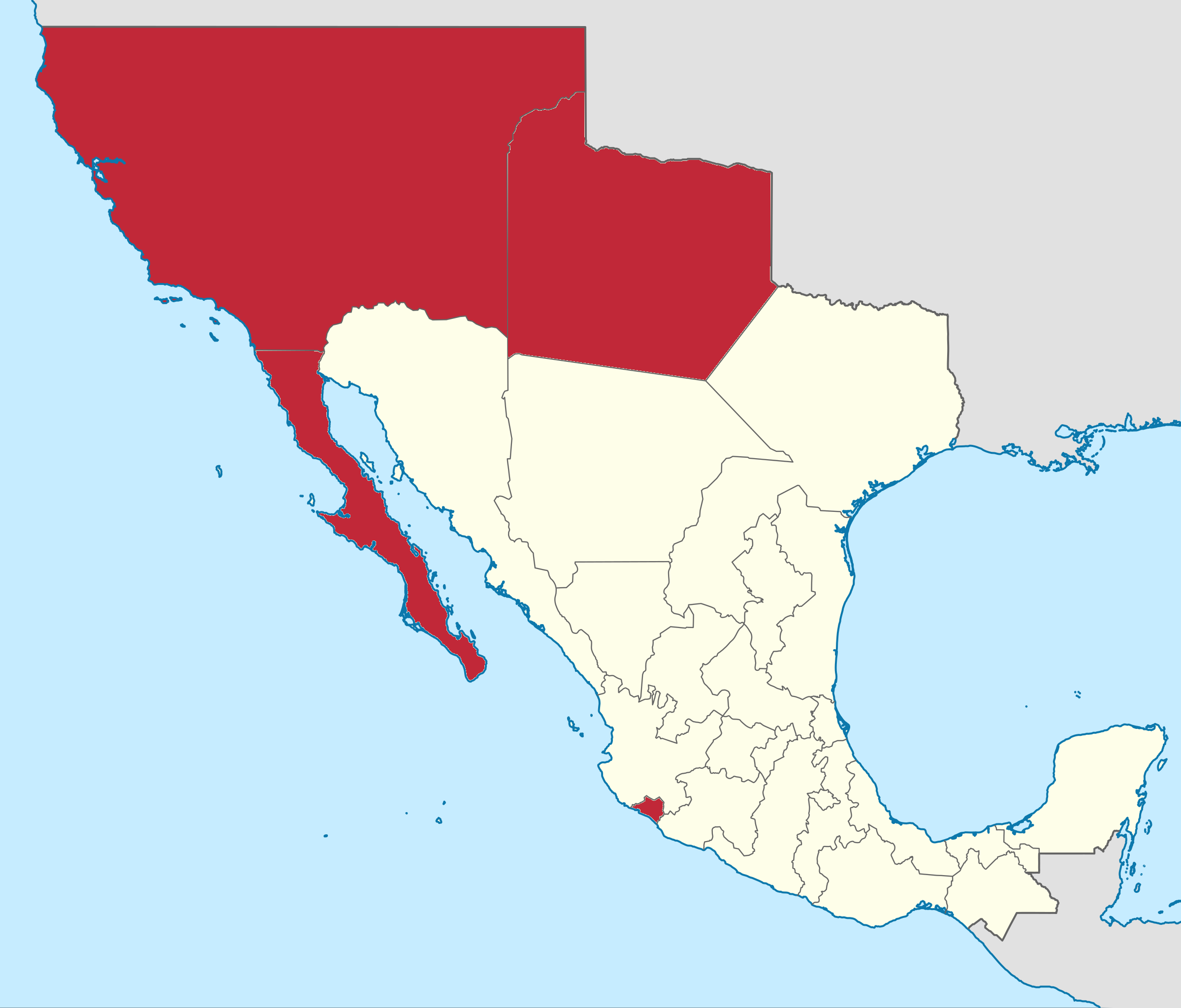
The territories of Mexico in 1824 (red).

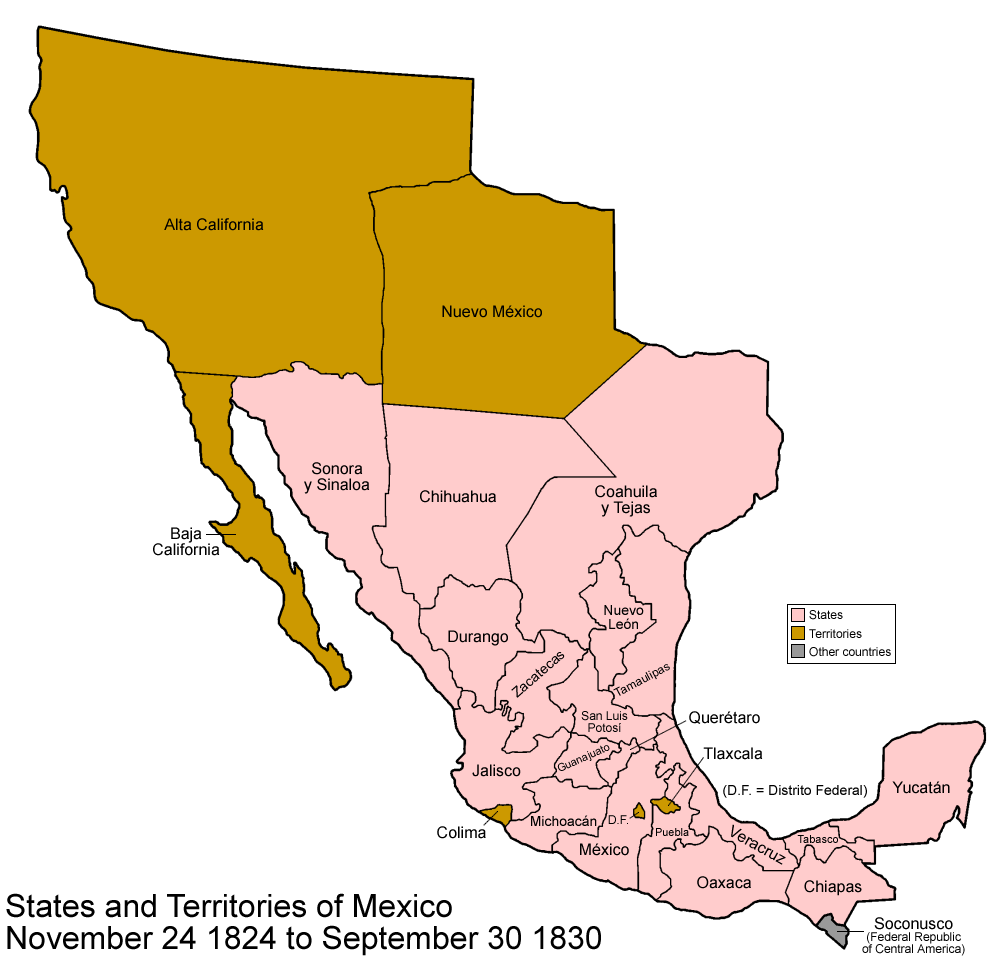
The territories of Mexico in 1830 (brown).

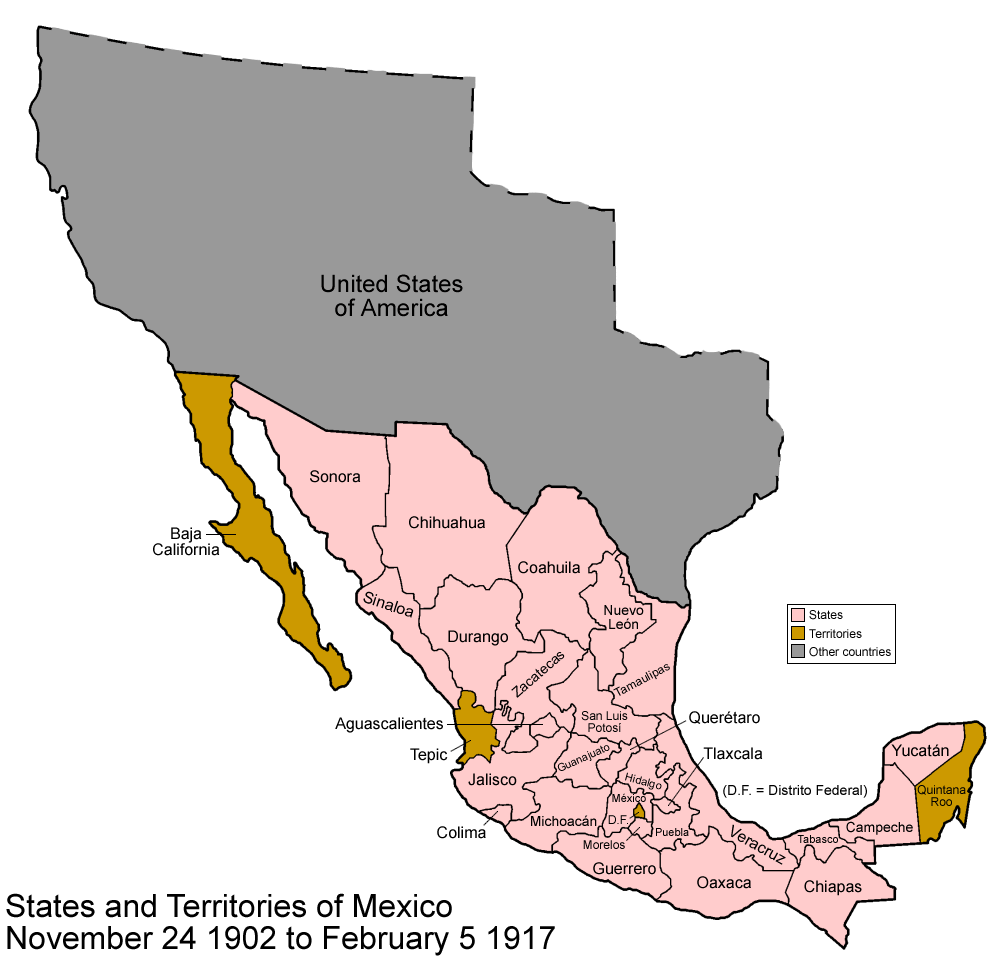
The territories of Mexico in 1902 (brown).

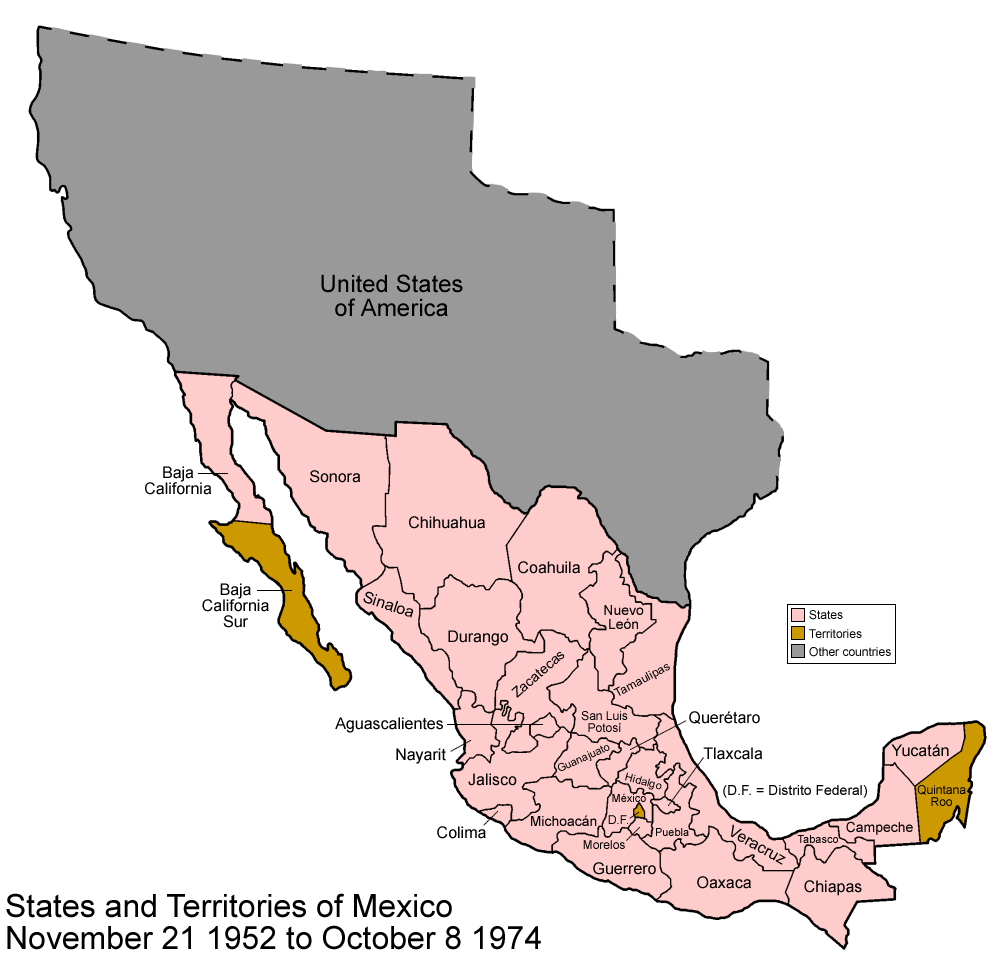
The territories of Mexico in 1952 (brown).

== See also ==
- Territorial evolution of Mexico
