= Aguascalientes Territory =

Mexican federal territory (1835–1857)

Coordinates: 22.016667°N 102.35°W

Aguascalientes Territory Territorio de Aguascalientes
- Territory of Mexico
- 1835–1857
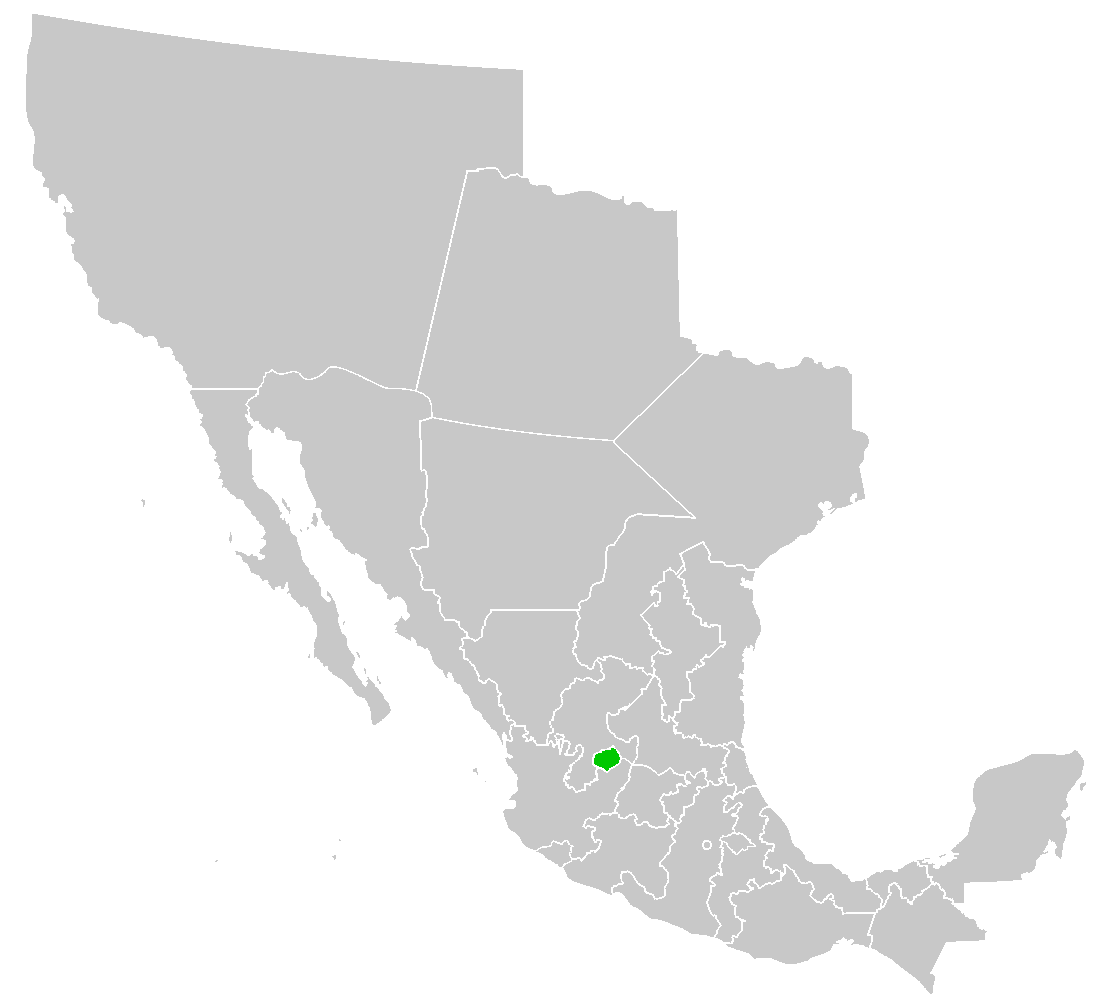
- Location of Aguascalientes Territory in Mexico
- Capital: Aguascalientes City
- Historical era: First Mexican Republic; Centralist Republic of Mexico; Second Federal Republic of Mexico
  - Established: 23 May 1835
  - Disestablished: 3 October 1857
- Today part of: Aguascalientes

Aguascalientes was a federal territory of Mexico, lasting from 1835 and 1857.

== History ==
In 1834 President Antonio Lopez de Santa Anna was taking measures against federalism and moving the country towards a more centralized system. Politicians in Zacatecas looked askance, as they had been supporters and defenders of the existing system since its implementation in 1824. An order to disband federal militias in early 1835, was taken in Zacatecas as the end of federalism. The citizens took up arms: they disobeyed the government and prepared to face the Mexican Army led by Santa Anna, to whom Congress had given extraordinary powers to appease the Zacatecas rebellion.

The people of Aguascalientes, taking advantage of the situation, sought the emancipation from Zacatecas. When Santa Anna arrived in the city of Aguascalientes on March 22, residents expressed their desire for separation. The president then met with them on May 23, 1835.

On October 3, 1857, Aguascalientes became a state of Mexico.

== Bibliography ==
- Evolución jurídico-política de Aguascalientes en México (PDF). Senado de la República, UNAM. 2010.
