= Jiménez Territory =

Mexican territory (1914–1917)

The Jiménez Territory (Spanish: Territorio de Jiménez) was a federal territory of Mexico that existed between 1914 and 1917. It was created by the decree of 17 June 1914 issued by the Congress of the United Mexican States that amended articles 43 and 44 of the Constitution of 1857, with the districts of Arteaga, Andrés del Río, Mina, Jiménez, and its capital, Hidalgo del Parral, from the state of Chihuahua; the decree also created the territories of Bravo and Morelos.

After the promulgation of a new constitution on 5 February 1917, the territory was reintegrated into the state of Chihuahua.
