= Mexico Department =

Mexican department (1835–1846; 1853–1856)

The department with its districts in 1837.

The Mexico Department (Spanish: Departamento de México) was a department during both periods of the Centralist Regime of Mexico in the 19th century, first existing between 1835 and 1846, and again between 1853 and 1856.

== History ==
The Mexico Department was created on 23 October 1835 as a move prior to the replacement of the federal system in place since 1824 for the centralist system, which was formally implemented through the Seven Laws promulgated on 30 December 1836. The department consisted of what was the State of Mexico, the federal district and the Tlaxcala Territory; its capital was Mexico City. It dissolved on 22 August 1846, when it returned to the federal system and the departments became states again.

With the ascension of Antonio López de Santa Anna to power, the federal states lost their autonomy and became departments again, confirmed with the decree of 22 April 1853; the established organization was short lived, since on 1 March 1854 the Plan of Ayulta dictated a repeal of centralism, though the Centralist Regime lasted until 15 May 1856, when the departments were supplanted by the previous states.

== See also ==
- Territorial evolution of Mexico
