= Territory of Quintana Roo =

Mexican federal territory (1902–1974)

Territory of Quintana Roo Territorio de Quintana Roo
- Territory of Mexico
- 1902–1974
- Location of the Territory of Quintana Roo (red) in Mexico.
- Capital: Santa Cruz de Bravo (1902–1913); Payo Obispo (1915–1974)
- Area
  - 1902: 50,844 km^{2} (19,631 sq mi)
- Government
  - Type: Territory of Mexico
- Territorial governor
  - 1971–1974: David Gustavo Gutiérrez (last)
- History
  - Established: 16 January 1902
  - First suppression: 10 June 1913
  - First reestablishment: 28 June 1915
  - Second suppression: 14 December 1931
  - Second reestablishment: 11 January 1935
  - Statehood: 8 October 1974
Preceded by	Succeeded by
Yucatán	Quintana Roo

The Territory of Quintana Roo (Spanish: Territorio de Quintana Roo) was a federal territory of Mexico that existed intermittently between 1902 and 1974, when it was granted statehood within the United Mexican States as Quintana Roo.

== History ==
The territory was created on 16 January 1902 by decree of President Porfirio Díaz and its first political leader was General José María de la Vega. The territory was named after an early Mexican patriot, Andrés Quintana Roo. Its capital was the city of Santa Cruz de Bravo, and it covered an area of 50,844 km². The main motivation for creating the territory, among other factors, was so that the Mexican Federal Army could confront the indigenous Maya people in the Caste War of Yucatán, and pacify the region.

A decade later and in the midst of the Mexican Revolution, Yucatecan politicians alleged that the creation of Quintana Roo had been the product of the dictatorial regime of Porfirio Díaz and proposed that the territory be returned to them. In this way, on 10 June 1913 Venustiano Carranza (First Chief of the Constitutional Army), pressured by peninsular economic and political interests, decreed the reintegration of the territory into Yucatán.

After the events that occurred in 1915, in which Abel Ortiz Argumedo revolted in Yucatán with the intention of creating a new republic, added to the opposition of the indigenous Maya in this region, Carranza ordered that the territory be reestablished on 28 June of the same year. Once the uprising in Yucatán was defeated, General Salvador Alvarado was sent to Santa Cruz de Bravo in order to calm the belligerent spirits of the Maya, who demanded the withdrawal of troops and the restitution of their lands; he gave them the town and the surrounding area. The Maya, then fearful of being target of attacks of this type again, destroyed the existing infrastructure and cut themselves off from the outside world. After this they never took up arms again. The capital was then moved to Payo Obispo.

The territory was again suppressed on 14 December 1931 by President Pascual Ortiz Rubio, citing economic limitations in the treasury for its support, and was then annexed by the states of Yucatán (northern zone) and Campeche (southern zone). Due to the discontent of the residents, the Pro-Territory Committee of Quintana Roo was created, which after many protests achieved its restitution on 11 January 1935 under President Lázaro Cárdenas. A year later, its capital Payo Obispo changed its name and became Chetumal.

The economic and population growth that Quintana Roo experienced after the construction of the port of Cancún and the agricultural and agro-industrial development in the south, allowed it to be elevated to the status of a state within the United Mexican States on 8 October 1974.

== See also ==
- Territorial evolution of Mexico

== Bibliography ==
- Lorena Careaga Viliesid; Antonio Higuera Bonfil (2010). Historia Breve de Quintana Roo (PDF) (in Spanish). Fondo de Cultura Económica de México. ISBN 978-607-16-0639-6. Archived from the original (PDF) on 2018-04-17.
