= Tlaxcala Territory =

Mexican territory (1824–1857)

Coordinates: 19°26′N 98°10′W

Tlaxcala Territory in 1824.

Tlaxcala Territory (Spanish: Territorio de Tlaxcala) was a territory of Mexico, from 1824 to 1857. The capital was Tlaxcala City.

The territory was located in East-Central Mexico, in the Altiplano region, with the eastern portion dominated by the Sierra Madre Oriental.

The territory was created on 24 November 1824, with its territory carved from the State of Puebla. Under the Centralist Regime, the territory was a part of the Department of Mexico between 1836 and 1846. On 3 October 1857, the territory became the State of Tlaxcala.

== See also ==
- History of Tlaxcala
- Territories of Mexico
- 1824 Constitution of Mexico
