= 1824 Constitution of Mexico =

Fundamental law of Mexico from 1824 to 1857

Federal Constitution of the United Mexican States
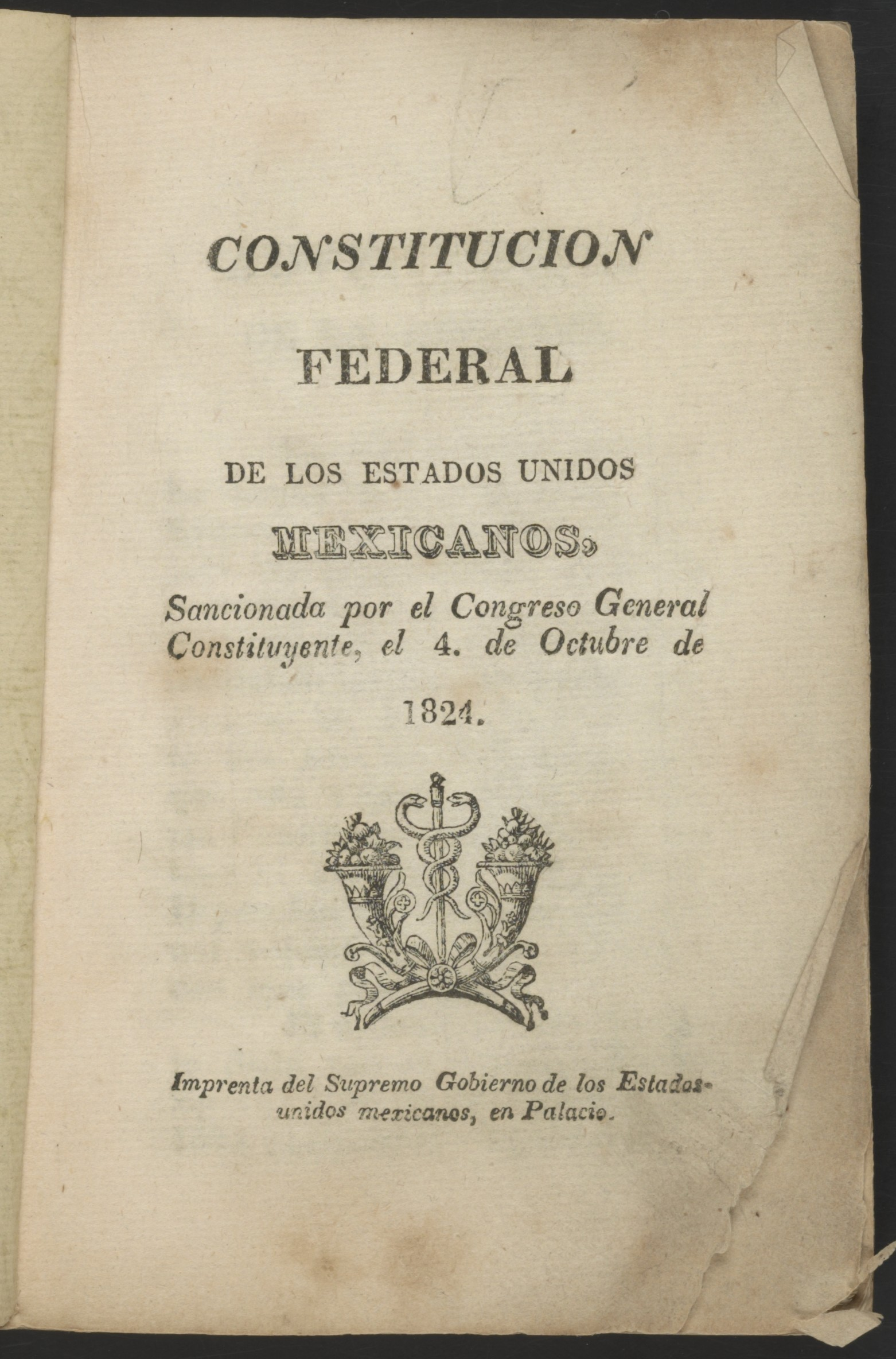
- Original front of the 1824 Constitution
- Created: January 21, 1824
- Ratified: October 4, 1824
- Superseded: by the Federal Constitution of the United Mexican States of 1857
- Location: General Archive of the Nation in the Lecumberri Palace
- Author: General Constituent Congress
- Signatories: General Constituent Congress

The Federal Constitution of the United Mexican States of 1824 (Spanish: Constitución Federal de los Estados Unidos Mexicanos de 1824) was the first constitution of Mexico, enacted on October 4 of 1824, inaugurating the First Mexican Republic.

== Background ==
During the Mexican War of Independence, the liberal dominated Spanish Cortes of Cádiz had included representatives from the colonies, and taken into account many of the colonial grievances which were leading to independence. The consequent liberal Constitution of 1812, was promulgated during the insurgency led by José María Morelos. It established a system of 'provincial deputations' which granted more autonomy to local governments in the colonies while also providing for freedom of speech. The newly liberated Mexican press however simply inflamed anti-Spanish sentiment, Morelos' rebellion continued, and on the pretext of necessity for subduing the rebels, the constitution was suspended in New Spain the same year it was proclaimed, making Mexican liberals lose hope of attaining reform within the colonial system, while not forgetting the local provincial autonomy that they had temporarily been granted.

Mexico finally gained its independence under the Plan of Iguala promulgated by Agustín de Iturbide, which planned for Mexico to be ruled by a member of the Spanish Bourbons, in either a personal union or with a member of the royal family travelling to Mexico to establish a new throne. The Spanish government refused the offer and a popular demonstration led to Iturbide himself assuming the throne. The ill-fated Empire which lasted less than a year, never managed to produce a constitution, and the failure to do so was one of the accusations Iturbide levelled at congress when he controversially dissolved it. The lack of clearly defined powers for congress and the emperor also contributed to the clashes which ultimately produced a successful rebellion against Emperor Iturbide in early 1823. The Empire was abolished and congress established the Supreme Executive Power to serve as a provisional government.

== Supreme Executive Power ==
On the May 21, 1823, elections were announced for a new congress whose term was scheduled to begin on October 31. Rules for the new election were published on June 17. Congressional seats were allocated on a basis of one representative per 50,000 inhabitants, elected by manhood suffrage available to any man over the age of 18, and using the three-tiered system established by the Constitution of 1812, by which voters in each parish chose electors, who then met at the district level and chose electors for the province level, whom in turn finally voted for representatives to be sent to Congress.

The new congress elected in late October was mainly federalist in composition. It first met on November 7, 1823, and soon divided itself into two main factions: the federalists, whose most prominent voice was Miguel Ramos Arizpe, and the centralists, whose most prominent voice was Servando Teresa de Mier. Through the minister of justice, the executive announced to the congress on November 14, that they must now set to work on answering the popular call to establish the government most suited for the nation. A constitutional committee headed by Arizpe, was commissioned with writing a constitutional draft, and on November 22, 1823, delivered the Constitutive Act (Spanish: Acta Constitutativa), with the fifth article declaring that Mexico adopts the republican, federal, popular, representative form of government, and debate on the matter began on December 3.

== Drafting a constitution ==
A committee consisting of Miguel Ramos Arizpe, Juan de Dios Cañedo, Miguel Argüelles, Rafael Mangino, Tomás Vargas, José de Jesús Huerta, and Manuel Crescencio Rejón, submitted an Acta Constitutiva (draft of a constitution) on 20 November. The group completed the draft of the charter in a few days. This was possible because the document was based on the shared Hispanic political theory and practice that Mexicans, the former novohispanos, knew well, since they had played a significant role in shaping it. In the years since Napoleon had invaded Spain in 1808, the political entities that formed the Mexican nation in 1821 had undergone a series of rapid political changes that politicized the majority of the population and led to a vibrant political discourse. The Directioners Constitution of 1812 and its institutions of government were well known; seven proposals for a Mexican constitution had been debated throughout the country in the previous months. The constituent congress, therefore, was filled with educated men with diverse ideas and extensive political experience at the local, state, national, and international levels. A few, like Ramos Arizpe and Guridi y Alcocer, had served in the Cortes in Spain and had participated in the discussions of the Constitution of 1812. In addition, Ramos Arizpe had been working on a federal constitution for some time. Lorenzo de Zavala was president of the congress that approved the constitution.

== Nature of the constitution ==
The Acta Constitutiva submitted by the committee was modelled on the Hispanic Constitution of 1812. Most of its articles were based on the Peninsular document; a few were adopted verbatim from that charter. For example, on the question of sovereignty the Hispanic Constitution stated: "Sovereignty resides essentially in the nation and, therefore, it [the nation] possesses the exclusive right to adopt the form of government that seems most convenient for its conservation and prosperity". Article 3 of the Mexican Acta Constitutiva read: "Sovereignty resides radically and essentially in the nation and, therefore, it [the nation] possesses the exclusive right to adopt by means of its representatives the form of government and other fundamental laws that seem most convenient for its conservation and greater prosperity". Although the deputies relied on their first constitutional experience, the Constitution of 1812, they did not slavishly copy the Hispanic model. Guridi y Alcocer, for example, explained that ever since he had served on the constitutional commission in the Hispanic Cortes he had maintained that sovereignty resided radically in the nation, by which he meant that the nation, as the institutional representative of el Pueblo, could not lose its sovereignty. His principal critics were radical federalists like Juan de Dios Cañedo, deputy from Jalisco, who challenged the need for an article declaring national sovereignty. He asked: that the article be deleted because in a republican federal government each state is sovereign. (...) Therefore, it is impossible to conceive how sovereignty, which is the origin and source of authority and power, can be divided among the many states. [T]hat is why the first constitution of the United States [the Articles of Confederation] (...) does not mention national sovereignty. And, therefore, (...) Article 1 which discusses the nation should not be approved because it is not appropriate in the system we now have.

The Acta, unlike the Hispanic constitution, did not grant exclusive or even preponderant sovereignty to the nation, because the states also claimed sovereignty. Accordingly, Article 6 stated: "Its integral parts are independent, free, and sovereign States in that which exclusively concerns their administration and interior government". The issue of sovereignty remained at heart a question of the division of power between the national and the state governments. It was an issue that would be debated at length in the months to come.

== Struggle among confederalists, federalists, and centralists ==
The proponents of state sovereignty—the confederalists—were challenged by some less radical federalist delegates who argued that only the nation could be sovereign. Because these men stressed the need to endow the national government with sufficient power to sustain national interests, they are often mistakenly considered centralists. Servando Teresa de Mier, their outstanding spokesman, argued that people wrongly considered him a centralist, an error that arose from an unnecessarily restrictive definition of federalism. He indicated that federalism existed in many forms: the Netherlands, Germany, Switzerland and the United States were federations, yet each was different. Mier advocated the establishment of a unique brand of federalism suited to Mexico. He believed that local realities precluded the adoption of the extreme form of federalism—confederalism—championed by states' righters. He declared: "I have always been in favour of a federation, but a reasonable and moderate federation. (...) I have always believed in a medium between the lax federation of the United States, whose defects many writers have indicated, (...) and the dangerous concentration [of executive power] in Colombia and Peru." In his view, Mexico needed a strong federal system because the country required an energetic and decisive national government to lead it during the crucial early years of nationhood, particularly since Spain refused to recognise Mexico's independence and the Holy Alliance threatened to intervene. For these reasons, Mier voted in favour of Article 5, which established a federal republic, while opposing Article 6, which granted sovereignty to the states.

Neither the advocates of states' rights, like Cañedo, nor the proponents of national sovereignty, like Mier, triumphed. Instead, a compromise emerged: shared sovereignty, as advocated by moderate federalists such as Ramos Arizpe. Throughout the debates, he and others argued that although the nation was sovereign, the states should control their internal affairs. The group saw no conflict between Article 3, which declared that sovereignty resided in the nation, and Article 6, which granted sovereignty to the states on internal matters. The moderates were able to forge shifting coalitions to pass both articles. First, they brought Article 3 to a vote. A coalition of the proponents of national sovereignty, the advocates of shared sovereignty, and a few centralists passed the article by a wide margin. To secure passage of Article 6, those favouring approval succeeded in having the question brought to the floor in two parts. The first vote, on the section of Article 6 which indicated that the states were independent and free to manage their own affairs, passed by a wide margin, since the wording pleased all the confederalist/federalist groups, including the one led by Father Mier. Only seven centralist deputies opposed the measure. Then Congress examined the section of Article 6 which declared that the states were sovereign. The coalition divided on this issue: Father Mier and his supporters joined the centralists in voting against the measure. Nevertheless, the proponents of states' rights and those who believed in shared sovereignty possessed enough strength to pass the measure by a margin of 41 to 28 votes.

The states did not just share sovereignty with the national government; they obtained the financial means to enforce their authority. They gained considerable taxing power at the expense of the federal government, which lost approximately half the revenue formerly collected by the viceregal administration. To compensate for that loss, the states were to pay the national government a contingente assessed for each state according to its means. As a result, the nation would have to depend upon the goodwill of the states to finance or fulfil its responsibilities.

== Weak executive branch ==
The constituent congress's decision to share sovereignty, moreover, did not settle the question of the division of power within the national government. Although all agreed on the traditional concept of separation of powers among the legislative, executive, and judicial branches, most congressmen believed that the legislature should be dominant. Recent Hispanic and Mexican experience had fostered a distrust of executive power. Therefore, the earlier Mexican Cortes had established a plural executive, the Supreme Executive Power. Since that body was perceived as subservient to the legislature, neither the provinces nor the Second Constituent Congress bothered to appoint a new executive. The authors of the Acta Constitutiva, however, proposed in Article 16 that executive power be conferred "on an individual with the title of president of the Mexican Federation, who must be a citizen by birth of said federation and have attained at least thirty-five years of age". The proposal led to a heated debate that transcended the former division between states' righters and strong nationalist coalitions. While Cañedo supported Ramos Arizpe in favouring a single executive, others, including Rejón and Guridi y Alcocer, insisted on the need to weaken executive power by establishing a plural executive.

Ramos Arizpe proposed that the president govern with the aid of a council of government. But that was not sufficient to mollify the opposition, which had the majority in congress. The opponents of a single executive presented several counter-proposals. Demetrio Castillo of Oaxaca suggested that a president, a vice-president and an alternate, called designee, should govern. Each would have a vote, but the president would cast the deciding one. Rejón, instead, recommended that three individuals form the Supreme Executive Power; their terms would be staggered so that one member would always possess seniority, but no individual would serve more than three years. Guridi y Alcocer proposed that the executive power be conferred on two persons. He argued that the best solution was to merge the experiences of ancient Rome, Spain, and the United States. Therefore, he urged that the two members of the executive power be backed by two alternates, who might resolve any differences that arose between the two members of the executive.

Article 16 of the Acta Constitutiva was put to a vote on 2 January 1824 at an extraordinary session. It was defeated by a vote of 42 to 25. As a result, the congress did not address Article 17, which dealt with the vice-president. The proposal to establish a president and a vice-president was one of the few instances in which the second constitution of the United States served as a model. The majority did not agree with the proposal because it feared the possibility of one individual dominating Congress through military or popular forces, as Iturbide had done. The commission on the constitution revised the articles on the executive a number of times, but could not obtain support for its proposals.

The fear of provincial disorder also influenced the debate. After Articles 5 and 6 of the Acta Constitutiva had been approved, several provinces decided to implement their right to form their own government. The national administration viewed their actions with concern, particularly because some movements were also anti-European Spaniards. The revolt of 12 December in Querétaro, for example, demanded the expulsion of gachupines (Spaniards who had come to Mexico) from the country. A similar uprising occurred later in Cuernavaca. In both instances, the national government sent forces to restore order.

Then, on 23 December, Puebla declared itself a sovereign, free, and independent state. The authorities in Mexico City immediately concluded that the military commander of the province, General José Antonio de Echávarri, was responsible for the "revolt". Therefore, the government dispatched an army under the command of Generals Manuel Gómez Pedraza and Vicente Guerrero to restore order. The forces of the national government approached the capital city of Puebla at the end of December 1823. After lengthy negotiations, General Gómez Pedraza proposed that, since Congress was about to issue the convocatoria for national and state elections, the leaders of Puebla renounce their earlier action and hold new elections. The Poblanos agreed. The convocatoria was received in Puebla on 12 January 1824. Elections were held throughout the province and a new state government was inaugurated on 22 March 1824.

Although the national government had maintained order in the nation, the revolt led by General Jose María Lobato on 20 January 1824 demonstrated that the plural executive could not act with the unity of purpose and the speed necessary to quell a large scale uprising in the capital. The rebels demanded the dismissal of Spaniards from government jobs and their expulsion from the country. Lobato managed to win support of the garrisons in the capital and the government seemed on the verge of capitulation when the Supreme Executive Power convinced Congress to declare Lobato an outlaw and to grant the executive sufficient power to quell the rebellion.

As a result of the crisis, the majority in Congress eventually decided to establish an executive branch composed of a president and a vice-president. The creation of a single executive, however, did not mean that Congress had accepted a strong presidency. Most Mexicans continued to favour legislative supremacy. The Mexican charter, like the Hispanic constitution, severely restricted the power of the chief executive. The Constitution of 1824 created a quasi-parliamentary system in which the ministers of state answered to the congress. Consequently, the minister of interior and foreign relations acted as a quasi-prime minister.

The creation of a national government did not end the tensions between the provinces and Mexico City. The debate over the location of the country's capital sparked a new conflict. The national elite favoured making the "Imperial City of Mexico" the capital of the republic. The regional elites were divided. During 1823, while discussing the importance of local control, they also emphasised the need to maintain a "centre of unity", that is, a capital. However, a significant number pointedly refused to bestow that honour upon Mexico City. The special committee on the nation's capital recommended to the Constituent Congress on 31 May 1824 that another city, Querétaro, become the capital, and that the territory around it become the federal district. After a heated debate, Congress rejected the proposal to move the capital from Mexico City. Thereafter, the discussion centred on whether or not a federal district should be created. The ayuntamiento and the provincial deputation of Mexico were vehemently against such action. Indeed, the provincial legislature threatened secession and civil war if Mexico City were federalised. Nevertheless, on 30 October Congress voted fifty-two to thirty-one to make Mexico City the nation's capital and to create a federal district.

== Constitution of 1824 ==
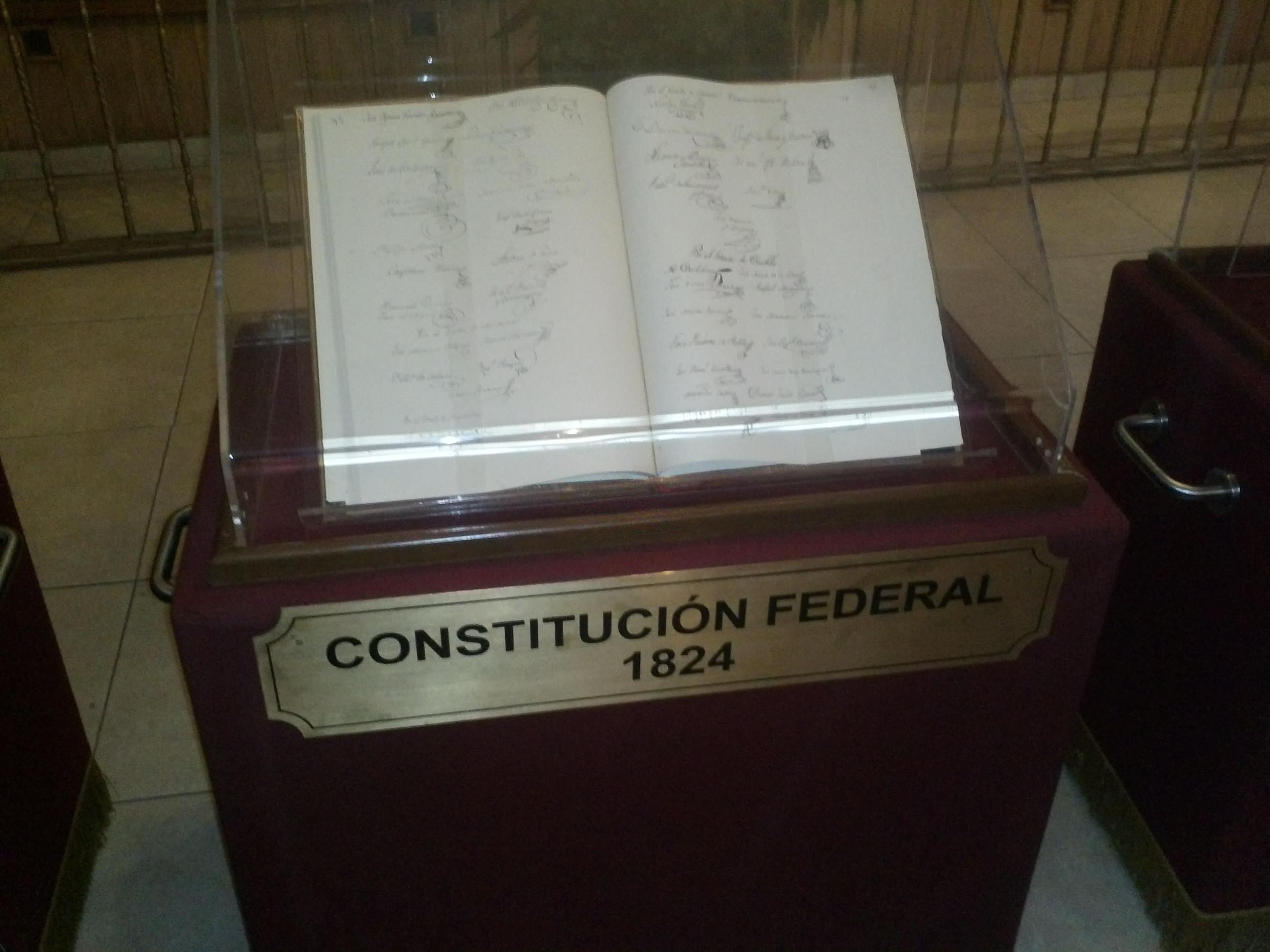
Constitution of 1824.

After months of debate, Congress ratified the constitution, on 4 October 1824. The new charter established that:

Article 3: The religion of the Mexican nation is and will permanently be the Roman, Catholic, Apostolic [religion]. The nation protects her with wise and just laws and prohibits the exercise of any other [religion].

Article 4. The Mexican nation adopts for its government a representative, popular, federal republic.

Article 5. The parts of this federation are the following states and territories: the states of Chiapas, Chihuahua, Coahuila and Texas, Durango, Guanajuato, México, Michoacán, Nuevo León, Oaxaca, Puebla de los Ángeles, Querétaro, San Luis Potosí, Sonora and Sinaloa, Tabasco, Tamaulipas, Veracruz, Xalisco, Yucatán and Zacatecas; and the territories of: Alta California, Baja California, Colima Territory and Santa Fe de Nuevo México Territory. A constitutional law will determine the status of Tlaxcala.

Article 74. The supreme executive power of the federation is deposited in only one individual who shall be called President of the United Mexican States (Estados Unidos Mexicanos).

Article 75. There will also be a vice president who, in case of the physical or moral incapacity of the president, will receive all his authority and prerogatives.

Like the Acta Constitutiva, the Constitution of 1824 was modelled on the Hispanic Constitution of 1812, not, as is often asserted, on the US Constitution of 1787. Although superficially similar to the latter although it adopted a few practical applications from the U.S. Constitution, such as the executive, the Mexican document was based primarily on Hispanic constitutional and legal precedents. For example, although the Constitution of 1824 created a president, in Mexico the office was subordinate to the legislature.

Since Mexico was essentially confederalist, rather than federalist, the Mexican Charter was closer in spirit to the first U.S. Constitution, the Articles of Confederation, than to the U.S. Constitution of 1787. Entire sections of the Cádiz Charter were repeated verbatim in the Mexican document because Mexicans did not reject their Hispanic heritage, and because men who drafted the new republican constitution had served in the Cortes of Cádiz and had helped write the 1812 Constitution. Both the 1812 Constitution and the Mexican Constitution of 1824 established powerful legislatures and weak executives. However, the 1824 constitution was not a mere copy of that of 1812. Events in Mexico, particularly the assertion of states' rights by the former provinces, forced Congress to frame a constitution to meet the unique circumstances of the nation.

The principal innovations (republicanism, federalism, and the presidency) were adopted to address Mexico's new reality. The monarchy was abolished because both Fernando VII and Agustín I had failed as rulers, not because Mexicans imitated the U.S. Constitution. Federalism arose naturally from Mexico's earlier political experience. The provincial deputations created by the Constitution of Cádiz simply converted themselves into states. Unlike the 1812 document, the Mexican charter gave the states significant taxing power.

Although modeled on the Spanish Constitution of 1812, the new charter did not address a number of issues included in the earlier document because the new Mexican federation shared sovereignty between the national government and the states. Thus, unlike the Constitution of Cádiz, which defined citizenship, the Mexican Constitution of 1824 remained silent on the subject. Similarly, it did not define who possessed the suffrage or the size of the population required to establish ayuntamientos (town councils), two significant factors in determining the popular nature of the Hispanic constitutional system. Those decisions were the prerogatives of the states.

The constitutions of the states of the Mexican federation varied, but they generally followed the precedents of the Constitution of Cádiz. Most state constitutions explicitly defined the people in their territory as being citizens of the state; they were chiapanecos, sonorenses, chihuahuenses, duranguenses, guanajuatenses, etc. Some states, such as Mexico and Puebla, simply referred to "the natives [sic] and citizens of the estate." The constitution is silent on the explicit status of Mexican women.

Following the Cádiz model, all states established indirect elections. A few, however, introduced property qualifications. Many also followed the constitution of 1812 in allowing ayuntamientos in towns with more than 1,000 persons, but some raised the population requirements to 2,000, 3,000 or 4,000. Tabasco permitted only the cabeceras (head towns) of the partido (district) to have ayuntamientos. Article 78 of Veracruz's constitution stated that the jefe of the department "will arrange the number and function of the ayuntamientos."

== Content ==
The 1824 Constitution was composed of 7 titles and 171 articles, and was based on the Constitution of Cádiz for American issues, on the United States Constitution for the formula for federal representation and organization, and on the Constitutional Decree for the Liberty of Mexican America of 1824, which abolished the monarchy. It introduced the system of federalism in a popular representative republic with Catholicism as official religion. The 1824 constitution does not expressly state the rights of citizens. The right to equality of citizens was restricted by the continuation of military and ecclesiastical courts. The most relevant articles were:

1. The Mexican nation is sovereign and free from the Spanish government and any other nation.
3. The religion of the nation is the Roman Catholic Church and is protected by law and prohibits any other.
4. The Mexican nation adopts as its form of government a popular federal representative republic.
6. The supreme power of the federation is divided into Legislative power, Executive power and Judiciary power.
7. Legislative power is deposited in a Congress of two chambers—a Chamber of Deputies and a Chamber of Senators.
50. Political freedom of press in the federation and the states (paragraph 1).
74. Executive power is vested in a person called the President of the United Mexican States.
75. It provides the figure of vice president, who in case of physical or moral impossibility of the president, exercise the powers and prerogatives of the latter.
95. The term of the president and vice president shall be four years.
123. Judiciary power lies in a Supreme Court, the Circuit Courts and the District Courts.
124. The Supreme Court consists of eleven members divided into three rooms and a prosecutor.
157. The individual state governments will be formed by the same three powers.

Although this was not stipulated in the constitution, slavery was prohibited in the Republic. Miguel Hidalgo promulgated the abolition in Guadalajara on 6 December 1810. President Guadalupe Victoria declared slavery abolished too, but it was President Vicente Guerrero who made the decree of Abolition of Slavery on 15 September 1829.

1. Slavery is abolished in the Republic.

2. Therefore are free those who until this day were considered as slaves.

3. When circumstances of the treasury permit it, it will compensate slave owners in the terms that are held by law.

== Federation ==
At the time of the promulgation of the Constitution, the nation was composed of 19 free states and 3 territories. That same year, two changes were made in the structure, resulting finally in 19 free states, 5 territories and the federal district.

Map of Mexico under the Constitution of 1824

The 19 founding states were:

| Order | Name | Date of Admission to the Federation | Installation date of the Congress |
|---|---|---|---|
| 1 | México | 20-12-1823 | 02-03-1824 |
| 2 | Guanajuato | 20-12-1823 | 25-03-1825 |
| 3 | Oaxaca | 21-12-1823 | 01-07-1823 |
| 4 | Puebla | 21-12-1823 | 19-03-1824 |
| 5 | Michoacán | 22-12-1823 | 06-04-1824 |
| 6 | San Luis Potosí | 22-12-1823 | 21-04-1824 |
| 7 | Veracruz | 22-12-1823 | 09-05-1824 |
| 8 | Yucatán | 23-12-1823 | 20-08-1823 |
| 9 | Jalisco | 23-12-1823 | 14-09-1823 |
| 10 | Zacatecas | 23-12-1823 | 19-10-1823 |
| 11 | Querétaro | 23-12-1823 | 17-02-1824 |
| 12 | Sonora y Sinaloa | 10-01-1824 | 12-09-1824 |
| 13 | Tabasco | 07-02-1824 | 03-05-1824 |
| 14 | Tamaulipas | 07-02-1824 | 07-05-1824 |
| 15 | Nuevo León | 07-05-1824 | 01-08-1824 |
| 16 | Coahuila y Tejas | 07-05-1824 | 15-08-1824 |
| 17 | Durango | 22-05-1824 | 08-09-1824 |
| 18 | Chihuahua | 06-07-1824 | 08-09-1824 |
| 19 | Chiapas | 14-09-1824 | 05-01-1825 |

- The five Federal Territories were: Alta California, Baja California, Colima, Tlaxcala, and Santa Fe de Nuevo México.
- The Federal District was established around the City of México on November 18, 1824.

== Reactions ==
Due to the influence of Spanish liberal thought, the fragmentation that had been gradually consolidated by the Bourbon Reforms in New Spain, the newly won Independence of Mexico, the size of the territory—almost 4,600,000 km^{2} (1,776,069 sq mi)—and lack of easy communication across distances, there resulted a federal system with regional characteristics. The central states—Mexico, Puebla, Querétaro, Guanajuato, Veracruz and Michoacán—which were the most populated, worked as an administrative decentralization. The states of the periphery—Zacatecas, Coahuila y Texas, Durango, Chihuahua, Jalisco, San Luis Potosí and Nuevo León—acquired a moderate confederalism. The states furthest from the center—Yucatán, Sonora y Sinaloa, Tamaulipas and Las Californias—acquired a radical confederalism.

Without the existence of established political parties, three political tendencies are distinguished. The first still supported the empire of Iturbide, but was a minority. The second was influenced by the Yorkist Lodge of freemasonry, whose philosophy was radical Federalism and also encouraged an anti-Spanish sentiment largely promoted by the American plenipotentiary Joel Roberts Poinsett. And the third was influenced by the Scottish Lodge of freemasonry, which had been introduced to Mexico by the Spaniards themselves, favored Centralism, and yearned for the recognition of the new nation by Spain and the Holy See.

With the consummation of independence, the "Royal Patronage" was gone, the federal government and state governments now considered these rights to belong to the State. The way to manage church property was the point that most polarized the opinions of the political class. Members of the Yorkist Lodge intended to use church property to clean up the finances, the members of the Scottish Lodge considered the alternative anathema. According to the federal commitment, states should provide an amount of money and men for the army, or blood quota. The federal budget was insufficient to pay debt, defense, and surveillance of borders, and states resisted meeting the blood quota, sometimes meeting that debt with criminals.

Some state constitutions were more radical and took supplies to practice patronage locally, under the banner of "freedom and progress". The constitutions of Jalisco and Tamaulipas decreed government funding of religion, the constitutions of Durango and the State of Mexico allowed the governor the practice of patronage, the constitution of Michoacán gave the local legislature the power to regulate the enforcement of fees and discipline of clergy, and the constitution of Yucatán, in a vanguardist way, decreed freedom of religion.

== Repeal and resettlement ==
In 1835, there was a drastic shift to the new Mexican Nation. The triumph of conservative forces in the elections unleashed a series of events that culminated on 23 October 1835, during the interim presidency of Miguel Barragán (the constitutional president was Antonio López de Santa Anna, but he was out of office), when the "Basis of Reorganization of the Mexican Nation" was approved, which ended the federal system and established a provisional centralist system. On 30 December 1836, interim president José Justo Corro issued the Seven Constitutional Laws, which replaced the Constitution. Secondary laws were approved on 24 May 1837.

The Seven Constitutional Laws, among other things, replaced the "free states" with French-style "departments", centralizing national power in Mexico City. This created an era of political instability, unleashing conflicts between the central government and the former states. Rebellions arose in various places, the most important of which were:

- Texas declared its independence following the change from the federalist system, and refused to participate in the centralized system. American settlers held a convention in San Felipe de Austin and declared the people of Texas to be at war against Mexico's central government, therefore ignoring the authorities and laws. Thus arose the Republic of Texas.
- Yucatán under its condition of Federated Republic declared its independence in 1840 (officially in 1841). The Republic of Yucatán finally rejoined the nation in 1848.
- The states of Nuevo León, Tamaulipas, and Coahuila became de facto independent from Mexico (in just under 250 days). The Republic of the Rio Grande never consolidated, because independence forces were defeated by the centralist forces.
- Tabasco decreed its separation from Mexico in February 1841, in protest against centralism, rejoining in December 1842.

The Texas annexation and the border conflict after the annexation led to the Mexican–American War. As a result, the Constitution of 1824 was restored by interim President José Mariano Salas on 22 August 1846. In 1847, The Reform Act was published, which officially incorporated, with some changes, the Federal Constitution of 1824, to operate while the next constitution was drafted. This federalist phase culminated in 1853.

The Plan of Ayutla, which had a federalist orientation, was proclaimed on 1 March 1854. In 1855, Juan Álvarez, interim President of the Republic, issued the call for the Constituent Congress, which began its work on 17 February 1856 to produce the Federal Constitution of the United Mexican States of 1857.

== See also ==
- Constitutions of Mexico
- Constitutionalists in the Mexican Revolution
- Political Constitution of the United Mexican States of 1917 (currently in force)
- History of democracy in Mexico
- Spanish Constitution of 1812
