= Tepic Territory =

Mexican federal territory (1884–1917)

Tepic Territory Territorio de Tepic
- Territory of Mexico
- 1884–1917
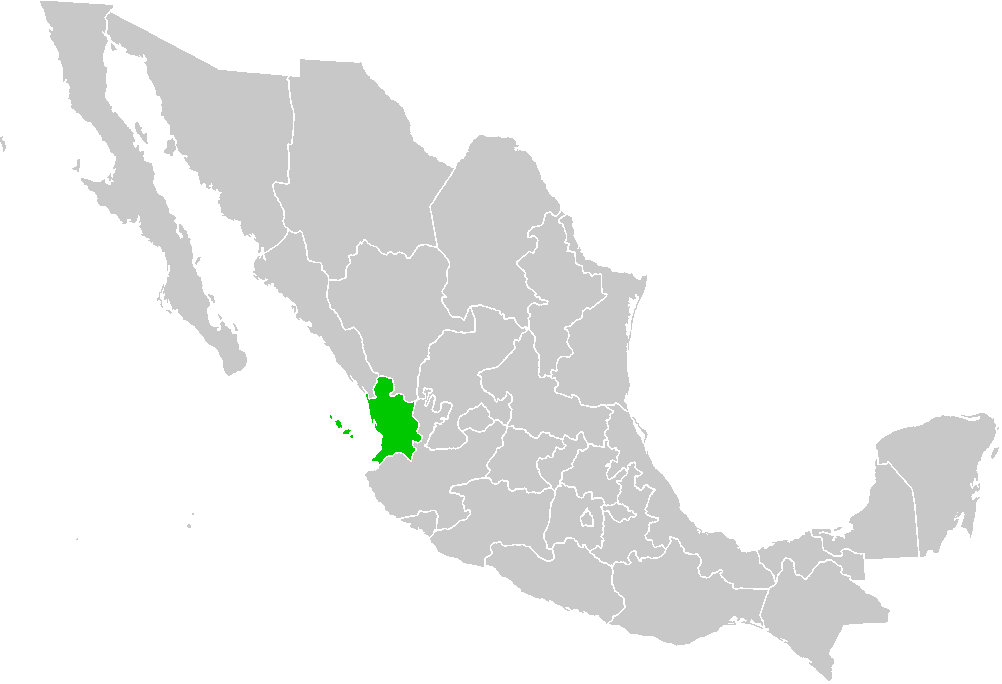
- Location of the Tepic Territory (green) in Mexico.
- Capital: Tepic
- Government
  - Type: Territory of Mexico
- Territorial governor
  - 1916–1917: Juan Torres Sánchez (last)
- Historical era: Porfiriato; Mexican Revolution
  - Established: 12 December 1884
  - Statehood: 1 May 1917
Succeeded by
Nayarit

The Tepic Territory (Spanish: Territorio de Tepic) was a federal territory of Mexico that existed between 1884 and 1917, when it was granted statehood within the United Mexican States as Nayarit.

== History ==
The Tepic Territory was created, by decree of President Manuel González Flores, on 12 December 1884. Its first political leader was General Leopoldo Romano. During his government, and that of his successor, Pablo Rocha y Portú (1897–1904), great industrial and agricultural advances were recorded. Coffee was grown in the towns of Huicicila, Malinal, El Llano, Mecatán, Jalcocotán and El Cora; cotton, in Santiago Ixcuintla and Tuxpan, from where it was supplied to the factories of Jauja and Bellavista.

Within the industrial sphere, the sugar mills of Puga and La Escondida saw a great economic boost. The Cigarrera de Tepic was created, whose cigars and cigarettes were considered top quality worldwide. Other cigarette factories were El Tráfico and El Amigo del Pueblo. At the end of Leopoldo Romano's government, workers' struggles began. In 1894, Francisca Quintero organized a work stoppage at the Bellavista textile factory. Two years later there was a strike in Jauja and in 1905 the Elías brothers led another strike in Bellavista.

When the Mexican Revolution broke out, the population of Ixtlán del Río was the first to take up arms against the authoritarian regime of Porfirio Díaz.

In 1911, General Martín Espinosa defeated the Porfirist forces, entered Tepic on 26 May of that year, and was immediately named political leader, replacing Mariano Ruiz (1904–1911). After the 1913 coup d'état led by Victoriano Huerta, Espinosa was overthrown; he was replaced with Huertista Jesús López de Haro, who resigned two months later, in favor of another Huertista, Agustín F. Migoni, who remained in power for five months, being succeeded by Domingo Servin, the last Huertista political leader. In the same year, troops of Rafael Buelna and Isaac Espinosa entered the territory. Servin was overthrown and the local population appointed the young Buelna as their leader. However, months later, he was replaced by Juan Dozal. In 1915, conflicts between Villistas and Constitutionalistas began. The discord reached the territory, where Dozal was overthrown; he was replaced with General Juan Carrasco. Carrasco left power two months later, being succeeded by Ernesto Damy, who in turn left power in the hands of General Juan Torres Sur (1915–1917). During the period of this political leader there was no longer any fighting and the territory began to recover. In 1916, the first labor union was created.

In the first general vote, the local population elected Juan Espinosa Bávara, Cristóbal Limón and Marcelino Cedano to the Constituent Congress of Querétaro, where the Territory of Tepic was transformed into Free and Sovereign State of Nayarit.

== Culture ==
In poetry Amado Nervo, Antonio Zaragoza, Quirino Ordaz and Solón Argüello stood out. In music, Manuel Uribe and Alejandro Manzo stood out as composers. The latter was the author of Las Mañanitas Tepiqueñas and Aires Nayaritas.

== Public works ==
1897: Drinking water is introduced in Tepic.
1909: The Mazatlán–Acaponeta railway is completed.
1911: The first trip by car is made on the route San Blas–Tepic–Mexico City.
1912: The Vice President of Mexico, José María Pino Suárez, inaugurated the Acaponeta–Tepic railway section.

== See also ==
- Territorial evolution of Mexico
