= List of states of Mexico =

Constituent federative entities of Mexico

States of Mexico Estados de México (Spanish)
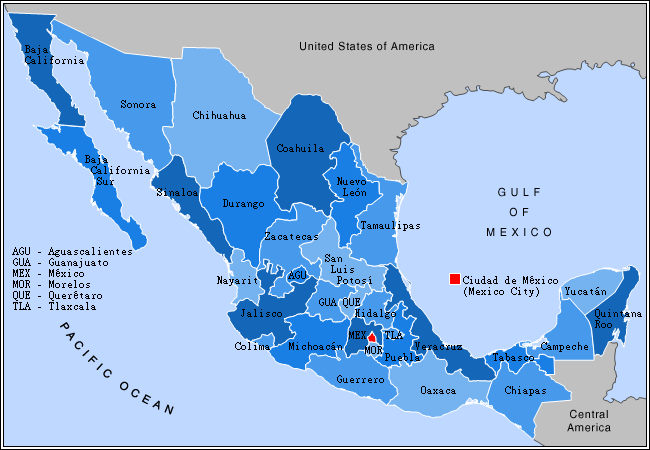
- The 31 states of Mexico and Mexico City
- Category: Federated state
- Location: Mexico
- Created: 4 October 1824
- Number: 32 federal entities
- Populations: Colima – lowest (719,445); México – highest (17,728,216)
- Areas: Mexico City – smallest (1,494.3 km^{2} (577.0 sq mi)); Chihuahua – largest (247,412.6 km^{2} (95,526.5 sq mi))
- Densities: Mexico City – highest (6,200/km^{2} (16,000/sq mi)); Baja California Sur – lowest (11/km^{2} (28/sq mi))
- Government: State government
- Subdivisions: Municipality or borough

A state (Spanish: estado), officially a Free and Sovereign State (Spanish: estado libre y soberano), is a constituent federative entity of Mexico according to the Constitution of Mexico. Currently there are 31 states, each with its own constitution, government, state governor, and state congress. In the hierarchy of Mexican administrative divisions, states are further divided into municipalities. Currently there are 2,462 municipalities in Mexico.

Although not formally a state, political reforms have enabled Mexico City (Spanish: Ciudad de México), the capital city of the United Mexican States, to have a federative entity status equivalent to that of the states since 29 January 2016.

Current Mexican governmental publications usually lists 32 federative entities (31 states and Mexico City), and 2,478 municipalities (including the 16 boroughs of Mexico City). Third or lower level divisions are sometimes listed by some governmental publications.

States by area
1. Chihuahua (12.6%)
2. Sonora (9.15%)
3. Coahuila (7.73%)
4. Durango (6.29%)
5. Oaxaca (4.78%)
6. Other (59.4%)

== List of federative entities ==
Mexico City, though not formally a state, is included for comparison.

Federative entities of the United Mexican States
Coat of arms and name	Cities		Area		Population		Munici- palities	Admission to federation	
Coat of arms and name	Capital	Largest	km^{2}	sq mi	2024 Q4	2020 census	Munici- palities	Admission to federation	
Aguascalientes	Aguascalientes		5,615.7	2,168.2	1,493,459	1,425,607	11	24th	5 Feb 1857
Baja California	Mexicali	Tijuana	71,450.0	27,587.0	3,779,050	3,769,020	7	29th	16 Jan 1952
Baja California Sur	La Paz		73,909.4	28,536.6	872,439	798,447	5	31st	8 Oct 1974
Campeche	San Francisco de Campeche		57,484.9	22,195.0	949,481	928,363	13	25th	29 Apr 1863
Chiapas	Tuxtla Gutiérrez		73,311.0	28,305.5	5,914,879	5,543,828	124	19th	14 Sep 1824
Chihuahua	Chihuahua	Ciudad Juárez	247,412.6	95,526.5	3,900,629	3,741,869	67	18th	6 Jul 1824
Coahuila de Zaragoza	Saltillo		151,594.8	58,531.1	3,457,516	3,146,771	38	16th	7 May 1824
Colima (Note: Includes the remote Revillagigedo Islands, which are federally administered.)	Colima	Manzanillo	5,626.9	2,172.6	719,445	731,391	10	22nd	12 Sep 1856
Durango	Victoria de Durango		123,364.0	47,631.1	1,890,563	1,832,650	39	17th	22 May 1824
Guanajuato	Guanajuato	León de los Aldama	30,606.7	11,817.3	6,313,504	6,166,934	46	2nd	20 Dec 1823
Guerrero	Chilpancingo de los Bravo	Acapulco de Juárez	63,595.9	24,554.5	3,603,188	3,540,685	85	21st	27 Oct 1849
Hidalgo	Pachuca de Soto		20,821.4	8,039.2	3,222,994	3,082,841	84	26th	16 Jan 1869
Jalisco	Guadalajara		78,595.9	30,346.0	8,732,495	8,348,151	125	9th	23 Dec 1823
México	Toluca de Lerdo	Ecatepec de Morelos	22,351.8	8,630.1	17,728,216	16,992,418	125	1st	20 Dec 1823
Mexico City (Ciudad de México) (Note: Mexico City was a Federal District until 29 January 2016, when this status was abolished.)	n/a	Iztapalapa	1,494.3	577.0	9,352,517	9,209,944	16	32nd	29 Jan 2016
Michoacán de Ocampo	Morelia		58,598.7	22,625.1	4,943,602	4,748,846	113	5th	22 Dec 1823
Morelos	Cuernavaca		4,878.9	1,883.8	1,964,164	1,971,520	36	27th	17 Apr 1869
Nayarit	Tepic		27,856.5	10,755.5	1,237,293	1,235,456	20	28th	26 Jan 1917
Nuevo León	Monterrey		64,156.2	24,770.8	6,130,641	5,784,442	51	15th	7 May 1824
Oaxaca	Oaxaca de Juárez		93,757.6	36,200.0	4,242,791	4,132,148	570	3rd	21 Dec 1823
Puebla	Puebla de Zaragoza		34,309.6	13,247.0	6,586,805	6,583,278	217	4th	21 Dec 1823
Querétaro	Querétaro		11,690.6	4,513.8	2,530,655	2,368,467	18	11th	23 Dec 1823
Quintana Roo	Chetumal	Cancún	44,705.2	17,260.8	1,917,252	1,857,985	11	30th	8 Oct 1974
San Luis Potosí	San Luis Potosí		61,138.0	23,605.5	2,874,010	2,822,255	59	6th	22 Dec 1823
Sinaloa	Culiacán Rosales		57,365.4	22,148.9	3,169,760	3,026,943	20	20th	14 Oct 1830
Sonora	Hermosillo		179,354.7	69,249.2	3,039,967	2,944,840	72	12th	10 Jan 1824
Tabasco	Villahermosa		24,730.9	9,548.7	2,537,961	2,402,598	17	13th	7 Feb 1824
Tamaulipas	Ciudad Victoria	Reynosa	80,249.3	30,984.4	3,575,756	3,527,735	43	14th	7 Feb 1824
Tlaxcala	Tlaxcala de Xicohténcatl	San Pablo del Monte	3,996.6	1,543.1	1,469,900	1,342,977	60	23rd	9 Dec 1856
Veracruz de Ignacio de la Llave	Xalapa-Enríquez	Veracruz	71,823.5	27,731.2	8,093,517	8,062,579	212	7th	22 Dec 1823
Yucatán	Mérida		39,524.4	15,260.5	2,375,403	2,320,898	106	8th	23 Dec 1823
Zacatecas	Zacatecas	Guadalupe	75,275.3	29,064.0	1,674,227	1,622,138	58	10th	23 Dec 1823
Mexico total	Mexico City		1,972,550.0	761,605.8	130,294,079	126,014,024	2,478	—	

=== Historic populations ===
The following table is a list of the 31 federal states of Mexico plus Mexico City, ranked in order of their total population based on data from the last three National Population Censuses in 2020, 2010 and 2000.

Map of each state's population as of 2015
Rank	State	Population (2020)	Population (2010)	Population (2000)
1	México	16,992,418	15,175,862	13,096,686
2	Ciudad de México	9,209,944	8,851,080	8,605,239
3	Jalisco	8,348,151	7,350,682	6,322,002
4	Veracruz	8,062,579	7,643,194	6,908,975
5	Puebla	6,583,278	5,779,829	5,076,686
6	Guanajuato	6,166,934	5,486,372	4,663,032
7	Nuevo León	5,784,442	4,653,458	3,834,141
8	Chiapas	5,543,828	4,796,580	3,920,892
9	Michoacán	4,748,846	4,351,037	4,384,471
10	Oaxaca	4,132,148	3,801,962	3,438,765
11	Baja California	3,769,020	3,155,070	2,487,367
12	Chihuahua	3,741,869	3,406,465	3,052,907
13	Guerrero	3,540,685	3,388,768	3,079,649
14	Tamaulipas	3,527,735	3,268,554	2,753,222
15	Coahuila de Zaragoza	3,146,771	2,748,391	2,298,070
16	Hidalgo	3,082,841	2,665,018	2,235,591
17	Sinaloa	3,026,943	2,767,761	2,536,844
18	Sonora	2,944,840	2,662,480	2,216,969
19	San Luis Potosí	2,822,255	2,585,518	2,299,360
20	Tabasco	2,402,598	2,238,603	1,891,829
21	Querétaro de Arteaga	2,368,467	1,827,937	1,404,306
22	Yucatán	2,320,898	1,955,577	1,658,210
23	Morelos	1,971,520	1,777,227	1,555,296
24	Quintana Roo	1,857,985	1,325,578	874,963
25	Durango	1,832,650	1,632,934	1,448,661
26	Zacatecas	1,622,138	1,490,668	1,353,610
27	Aguascalientes	1,425,607	1,184,996	944,285
28	Tlaxcala	1,342,977	1,169,936	962,646
29	Nayarit	1,235,456	1,084,979	920,185
30	Campeche	928,363	822,441	690,689
31	Baja California Sur	798,447	637,026	424,041
32	Colima	731,391	650,555	542,627
Total		126,014,024	112,336,538	97,483,412

== Lists by topic ==
State symbols:

- State flags of Mexico
- List of Mexican state name etymologies
- List of Mexican state demonyms
- List of Mexican states by date of statehood
- Mexico State-Abbreviation Codes

State governments:

- Lists of Mexican state governors
- List of current state governors in Mexico
- List of Mexican state congresses (with current composition)

Other:

- List of Mexican states by area
- List of Mexican states by population density
- List of Mexican states by GDP
- List of Mexican states by GDP per capita
- List of Mexican states by HDI

== See also ==
- Administrative divisions of Mexico
- Territorial evolution of Mexico
- State governments of Mexico
- Territories of Mexico
- Postal codes in Mexico
