= The Californias =

Region of western North America

The Californias Las Californias
- Region of North America
- Country: Mexico; United States
- U.S. state: California
- Mexican states: Baja California; Baja California Sur
- Principal cities: List: Los Angeles, CA; San Diego, CA; Monterey, CA; San Jose, CA; San Francisco, CA; Tijuana, BC; Mexicali, BC; La Paz, BCS; Los Cabos, BCS

Area
  - Total: 219,819 sq mi (569,329 km^{2})

Population
  - Total: 43,636,740
  - Density: 200/sq mi (77/km^{2})

Time zones
- California and Baja California: UTC-8 (PST)
  - Summer (DST): UTC-7 (PDT)
- Baja California Sur: UTC-7 (MST)

The Californias (Spanish: Las Californias), occasionally known as the Three Californias or the Two Californias, are a region of North America spanning the United States and Mexico, consisting of the U.S. state of California and the Mexican states of Baja California and Baja California Sur. Historically, the term Las Californias was used to define the vast northwestern region of Spanish America, as the Province of the Californias (Spanish: Provincia de las Californias), and later as a collective term for Alta California and the Baja California peninsula.

Originally a single, vast entity within the Spanish Empire, administration was split into Baja California (Lower California) and Alta California (Upper California) following the Mexican War of Independence. As a part of the Mexican–American War (1846–48), the Conquest of California saw the vast Alta California territory ceded from Mexico to the United States. The populated coastal region of the territory was admitted into the Union in 1850 as the State of California, while the vast, sparsely populated interior region would only later gain statehood as Nevada, Utah, and parts of New Mexico, Arizona, Wyoming, and Colorado.

Today, "the Californias" is a collective term to refer to the American and Mexican states bearing the name California, which share geography, history, cultures, and strong economic ties. The Commission of the Californias is a tri-lateral forum for cooperation between the three Californian state governments.

== Etymology ==
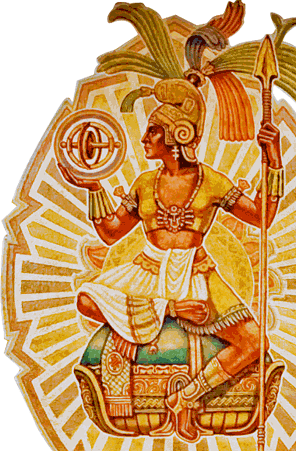
The name of California and its fictional ruler Queen Calafia originate in the 1510 epic Las Sergas de Esplandián, written by Garci Rodríguez de Montalvo.

There has been understandable confusion about use of the plural Californias by Spanish colonial authorities. California historian Theodore Hittell offered the following explanation:

In very early times, while the country was supposed to be an island or rather several islands, it was commonly known by the plural appellation of "Las Californias" (The Californias). Afterwards, when its peninsular character was ascertained, it was called simply California; but the territory so designated was unlimited in extent. When the expeditions for the settlement of San Diego and Monterey marched, it was understood that they were going, not out of California, but into a new part of it. The peninsula then began to be generally spoken of as Antigua or Old California and the unlimited remainder as Nueva or New California, subsequently more commonly called Alta or Upper California. At the same time the old plural name of The Californias was revived, but with a more definite signification than before.

== History ==
The first attempted Spanish occupation of California was by the Jesuit missionary Eusebio Kino, in 1683. His Misión San Bruno failed, however, and it was not until 1697 that Misión de Nuestra Señora de Loreto Conchó was successfully established by another Jesuit, Juan María de Salvatierra. The mission became the nucleus of Loreto, first permanent settlement and first administrative center of the province. The Jesuits went on to found a total of 18 missions in the lower two-thirds of the Baja California Peninsula.

=== Province of New Spain ===
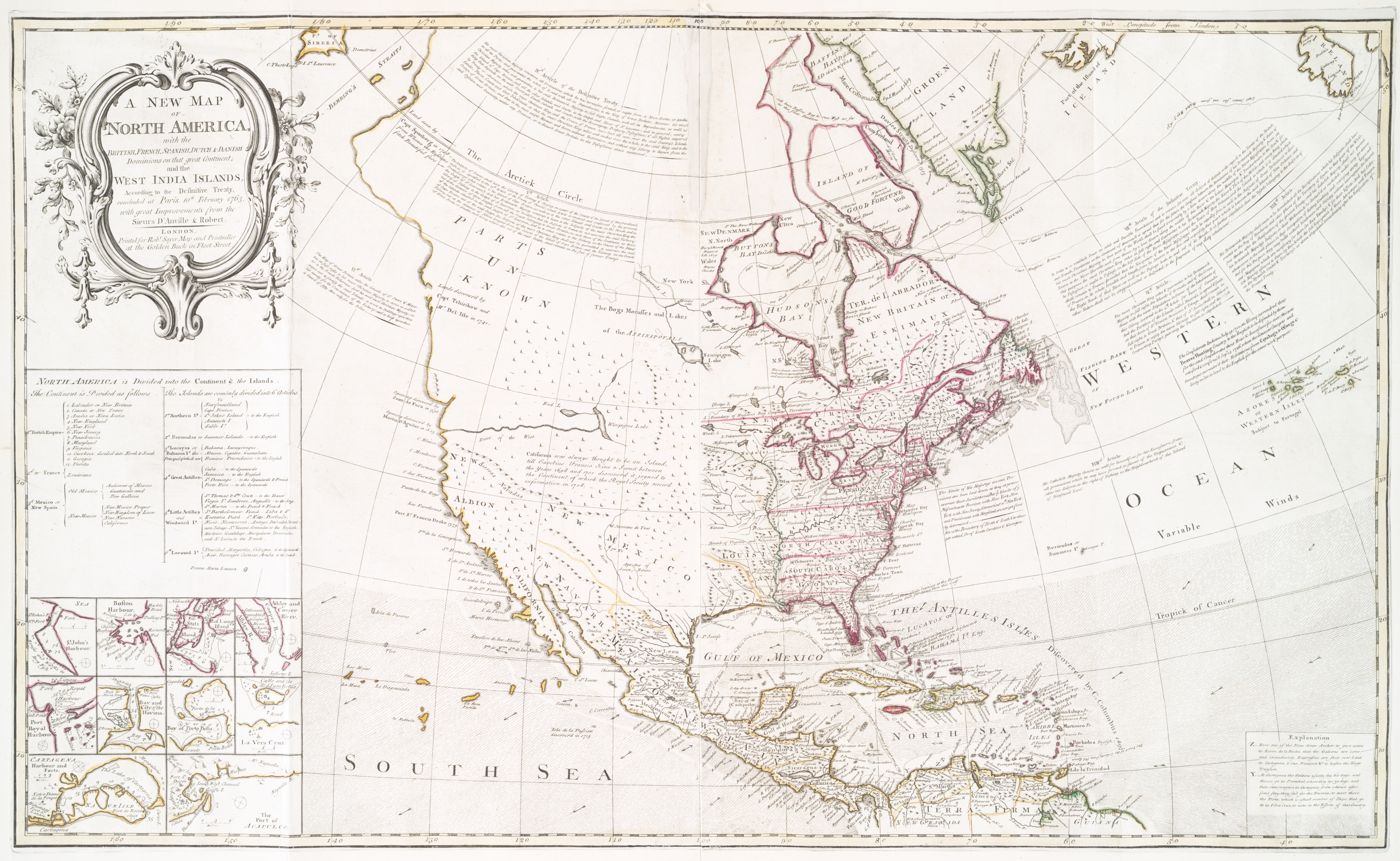
A New Map of North America, produced in London following the 1763 Treaty of Paris, five years before the establishment of the Province of the Californias. Note the name "California" placed on the Baja California Peninsula.

In 1767, the Jesuits were expelled from the missions, and Franciscans were brought in to take over. Gaspar de Portolá was appointed governor to supervise the transition. At the same time, a new visitador, José de Gálvez, was dispatched from Spain with authority to organize and expand the fledgling province.

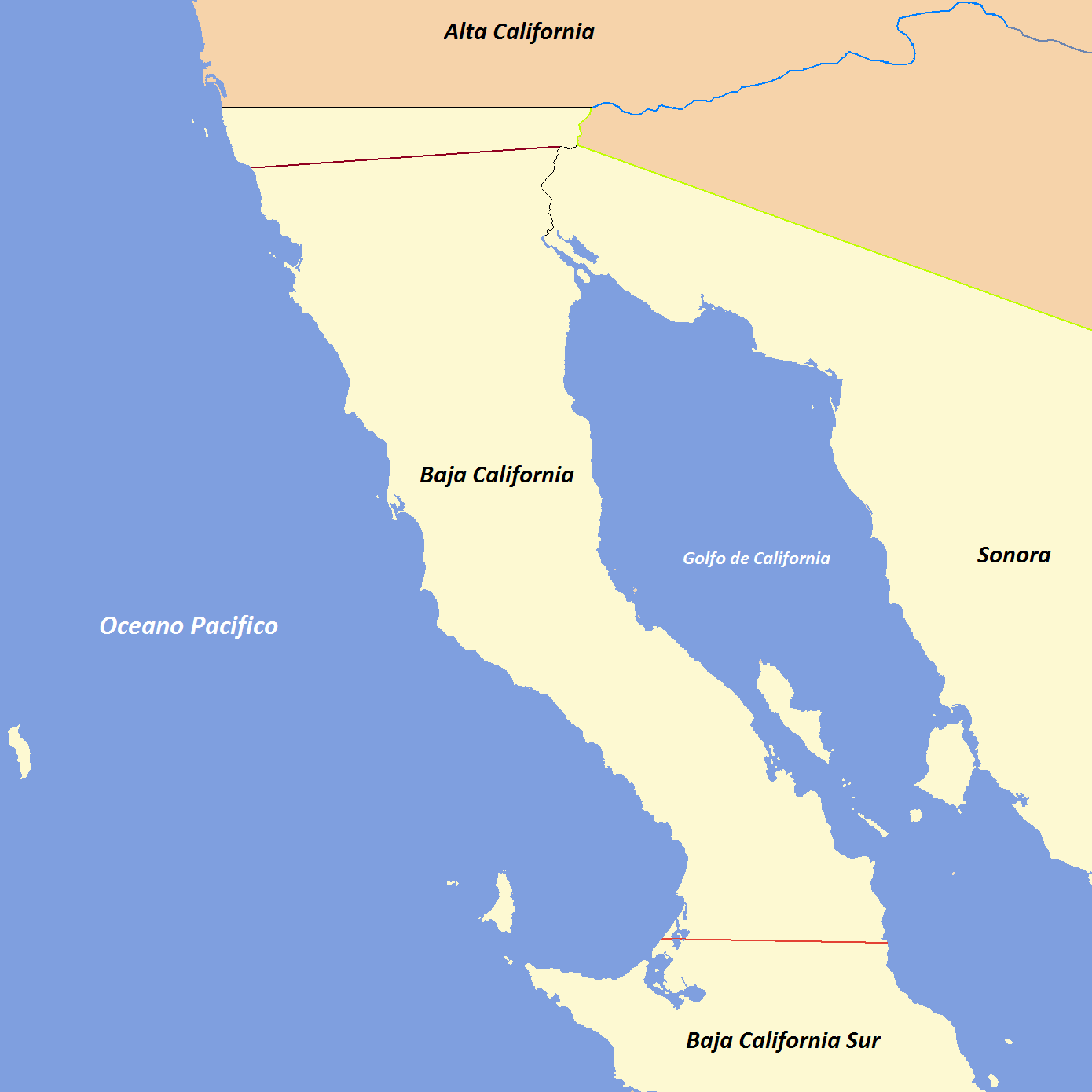
Evolution of the political boundaries of the Californias: Palóu Line (1804–1836) Gila River; border between Las Californias/Alta California and Sonora (1767–1847) Treaty of Guadalupe Hidalgo (1848–Present) Baja California Sur boundary (1931–Present)

The more ambitious province name, Las Californias, was established by a joint dispatch to the King from Viceroy de Croix and visitador José de Gálvez, dated January 28, 1768. Gálvez sought to make a distinction between the Antigua ('old') area of established settlement and the Nueva ('new') unexplored areas to the north. At that time, almost the only explored and settled areas of the province were around the former Jesuit missions but, once exploration and settlement of the northern frontier began in earnest, the geographical designations Alta ('upper') and Baja ('lower') gained favor.

The single province was divided in 1804, into Alta California province and Baja California province. By the time of the 1804 split, the Alta province had expanded to include coastal areas as far north as what is now the San Francisco Bay Area in the U.S. state of California. Expansion came through exploration and colonization expeditions led by Portolá (1769), his successor Pedro Fages (1770), Juan Bautista de Anza (1774–76), the Franciscan missionaries and others. The capital of Alta California was Monterey. Independent Mexico retained the division but demoted the former provinces to territories, due to populations too small for statehood.

=== Department of Mexico ===
Department of the Californias Departamento de las Californias
- Department of the Mexican Republic
- 1836–1847
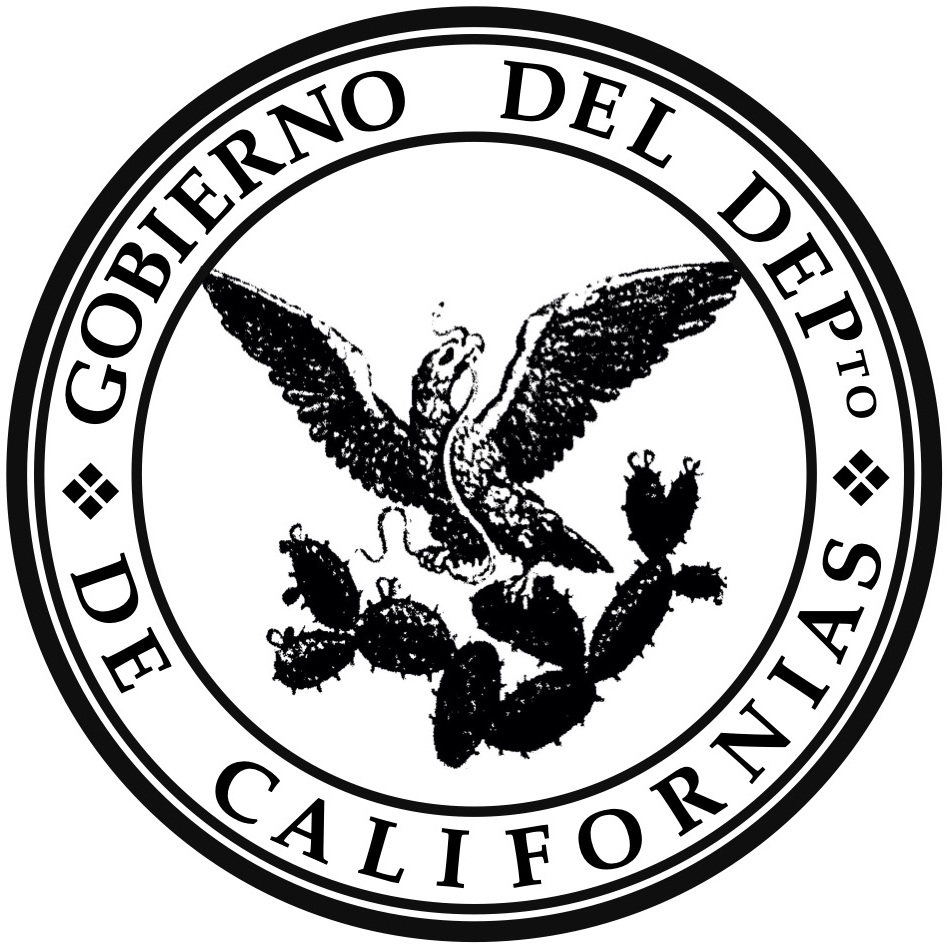
- Seal

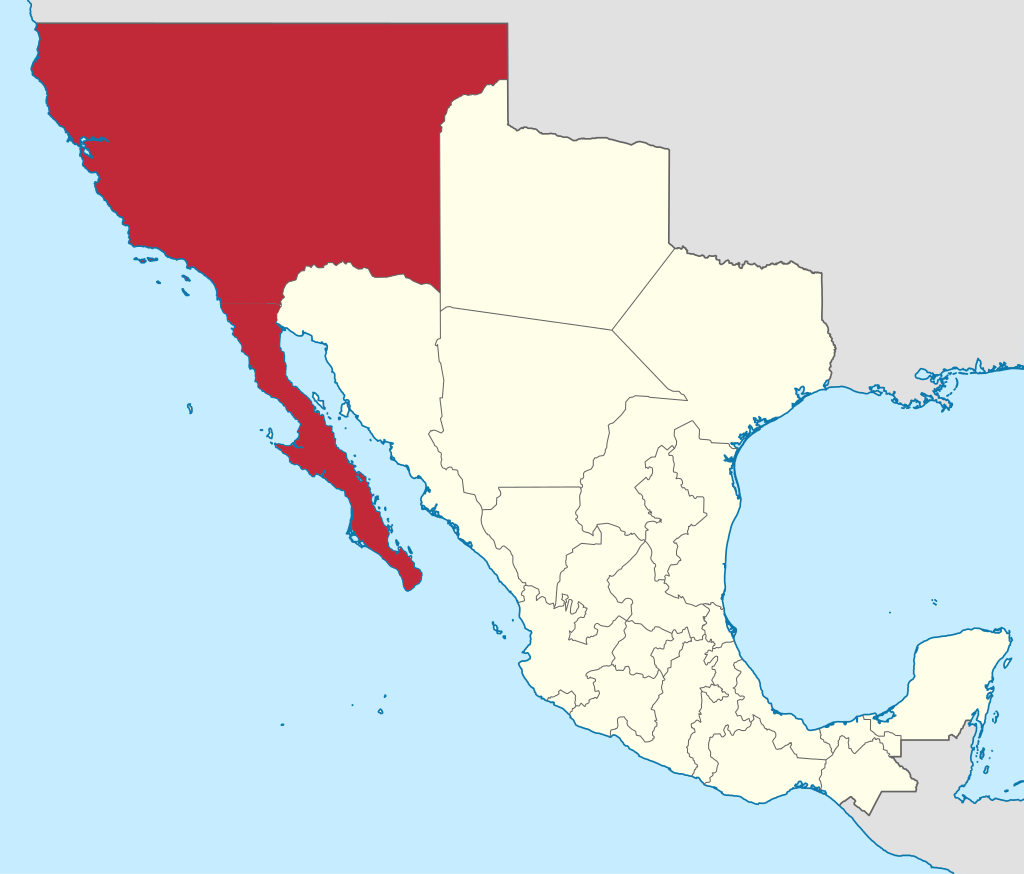
- Capital: Loreto, Ensenada, Pueblo de Los Angeles, & Monterey
- Demonym: Californio
- History
  - Established: 1836
  - Disestablished: 1847
Preceded by
Alta California
Baja California Territory
Succeeded by
California Republic
Mexican Cession
Baja California Territory
- Today part of: California; Baja California; Baja California Sur; Nevada; Arizona; Utah; Wyoming

In 1836, the designation Las Californias was revived, reuniting Alta and Baja California into a single departamento (department) as part of the conservative government reforms codified in the Siete Leyes (Seven Laws). The Seven Laws were repealed in 1847, during the Mexican–American War, and the split of the two Californias was restored.

=== The Californias after 1848 ===
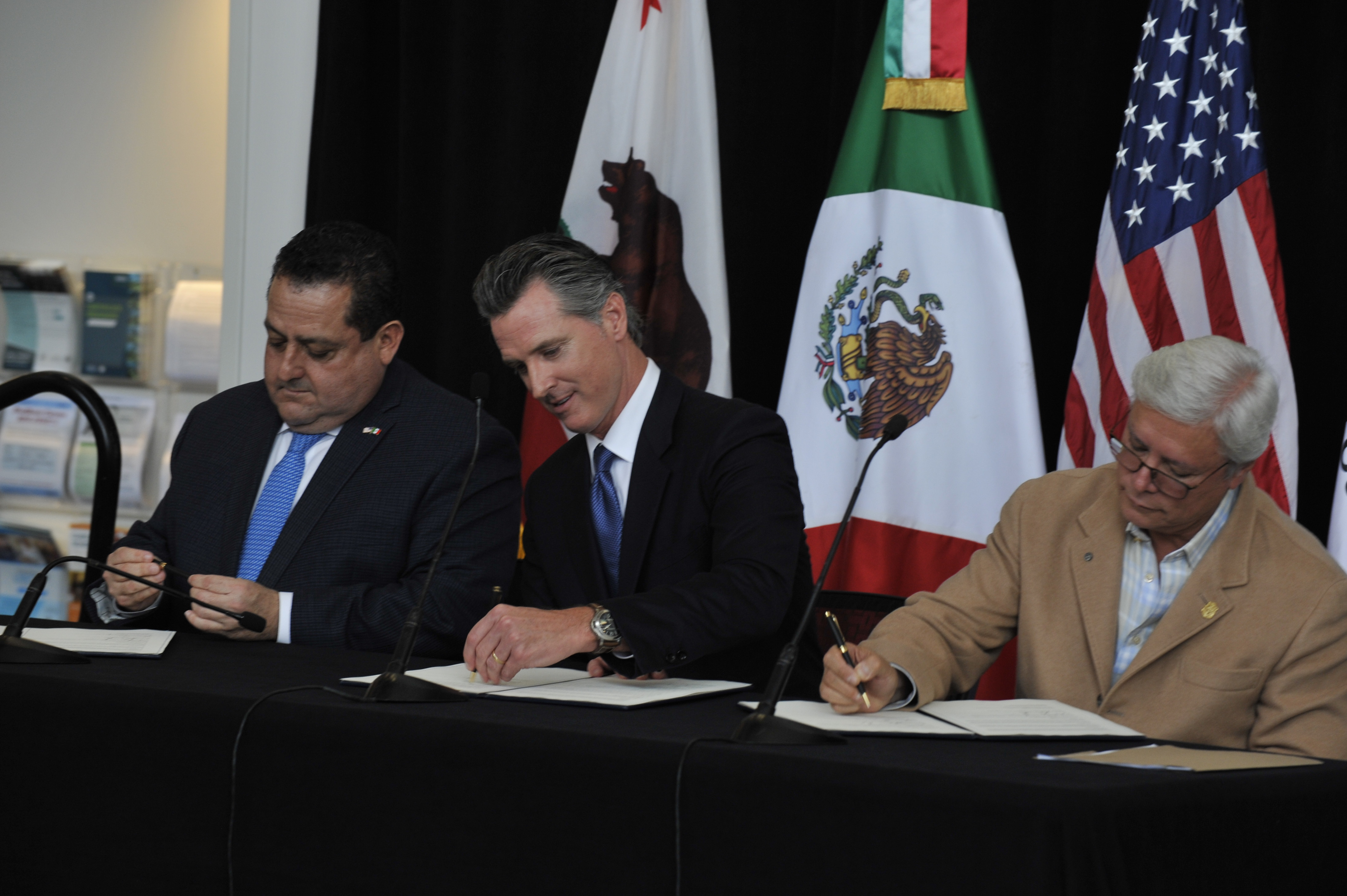
Ceremony for the reestablishment of the Commission of the Californias in 2019, San Diego. Pictured are Governor Jaime Bonilla Valdez of Baja California (right), Governor Gavin Newsom of California (center), and Governor Carlos Mendoza Davis of Baja California Sur (left).

Following Mexico's defeat in the war, most of the former Alta California territory was ceded on 2 February 1848 to the United States, under the terms of the Treaty of Guadalupe Hidalgo. The new Mexico–United States border was established slightly to the north of the previous Alta-Baja border, and the terms Las Californias and Alta California were no longer formally used. The areas acquired by the U.S. remained under military authority, pending creation of civilian government through territorial designation and/or statehood.

Baja California in Mexico was established as the Baja California Territory after the War. It was split by the Congress into Northern and Southern territories. Seven new U.S. states were created entirely or partly from land formerly included in the Californias.

- 1850. California became the 31st of the United States.
- 1853. The Gadsden Purchase transferred additional territory from Mexico to the United States.
- 1853. William Walker led a force that attempted to capture the Baja California Territory and Sonora to create an independent Republic of Sonora. Walker was defeated by Mexican forces led by Antonio Meléndrez.
- 1864. Nevada became the 36th of the United States.
- 1876. Colorado became the 38th of the United States.
- 1890. Wyoming became the 44th of the United States.
- 1896. Utah became the 45th of the United States.
- 1912. New Mexico became the 47th of the United States.
- 1912. Arizona became the 48th of the United States.
- 1931. Baja California Territory was divided into the Territory of Baja California Norte and the Territory of Baja California Sur.
- 1952. The Territory of Baja California Norte became the 29th State of Mexico as Baja California.
- 1974. The Territory of Baja California Sur became the 31st State of Mexico as Baja California Sur.

== Geography ==
The Baja California Peninsula is bordered on three sides by water, the Pacific Ocean (south and west) and Gulf of California (east); while Alta California had the Pacific Ocean on the west and deserts on the east. A northern boundary was established by the Adams–Onís Treaty of 1819. That boundary line remains the northern boundary of the U.S. states of California, Nevada, and the western part of Utah.

=== Largest cities ===
Largest cities or towns in the Californias Source:
Rank		Metro Area	Pop.
1	Los Angeles	Greater Los Angeles	3,898,747
2	Tijuana	San Diego–Tijuana	1,810,645
3	San Diego	San Diego–Tijuana	1,386,932
4	San Jose	San Francisco Bay Area	1,013,240
5	San Francisco	San Francisco Bay Area	873,965
6	Mexicali	Calexico–Mexicali	854,186
7	Fresno	Metropolitan Fresno	542,107
8	Sacramento	Greater Sacramento	524,943
9	Long Beach	Greater Los Angeles	466,742
10	Oakland	San Francisco Bay Area	440,646

=== Territorial evolution ===
Inland regions were mostly unexplored by the Spanish, leaving them generally outside the control of the colonial authorities. Mountain ranges of the Peninsular Ranges, eastern Transverse Ranges, and the Sierra Nevada, along with the arid Colorado Desert, Mojave Desert, and Great Basin Desert in their eastern rain shadows, served as natural barriers to Spanish settlement. The eastern border of upper Las Californias was never officially defined under either Spanish or subsequent Mexican rule. The 1781 Instrucciones and government correspondence described Alta California ("Upper California") as the areas to the west of the Sierra Nevada and the lower part of the Colorado River in the Lower Colorado River Valley (the river forms the present-day border between the states of California and Arizona).

Territorial Evolution of Las Californias
Spanish Empire	Province of Las Californias (1767–1804)						
Spanish Empire	Province of Baja California (1804–1824)		Province of Alta California (1804–1824)				
1st Republic	Territory of Baja California (1824–1836)		Territory of Alta California (1824–1836)				
Centralist Republic	Department of Las Californias (1837–1847); California Republic (1846)						
After Mexican Cession	Territory of Baja California with land from former Alta California		State of California (est. 1850)	Territory of New Mexico (1850–1912)		Territory of Utah (1850–1896)	
Territorial reorganization	Department of California (1865–1867); Territory of Baja California (1867–1931)		State of California (est. 1850)	Territory of Arizona (1863–1912)	Territory of Nevada (1861–1864)	Territory of Utah (1850–1896)	Territory of Wyoming (1868–1890)
Territorial reorganization	Territory of Baja California Sur (1931–1974)	Territory of Baja California Norte (1931–1952)	State of California (est. 1850)	Territory of Arizona (1863–1912)	Territory of Nevada (1861–1864)	Territory of Utah (1850–1896)	Territory of Wyoming (1868–1890)
Statehood	State of Baja California Sur (est. 1974)	State of Baja California (est. 1952)	State of California (est. 1850)	State of Arizona (est. 1912); Northern part	State of Nevada (est. 1864)	State of Utah (est. 1896)	State of Wyoming (est. 1890); SW part

== See also ==
- Spanish missions in Baja California
- Spanish missions in California
- Indigenous peoples of California
  - Population of Native California
  - Indigenous peoples of Baja California
- Ranchos of California
- History of California
  - History of California through 1899
  - Territorial evolution of California
- Spanish colonization of the Americas
- The Canadas
- The Carolinas
- The Dakotas
- The Floridas
- The Virginias
