= Baja California Territory =

Mexican territory from 1824-1853 and 1854-1931

Coordinates: 28.0374°N 113.3240°W

- Territory of Mexico
- 1824–1931
- Location of the Baja California Territory (red) in Mexico, 1824.
- Capital: Loreto (1824–1829); La Paz (1829–1931)
  - Type: Territory of Mexico
- History
  - Created: 1824
  - Divided: 1931
Preceded by
The Californias
State of the Californias
Republic of Sonora
California Department
Succeeded by
Department of the Californias
Republic of Baja California
California Department
Territory of Baja California Norte
Territory of Baja California Sur

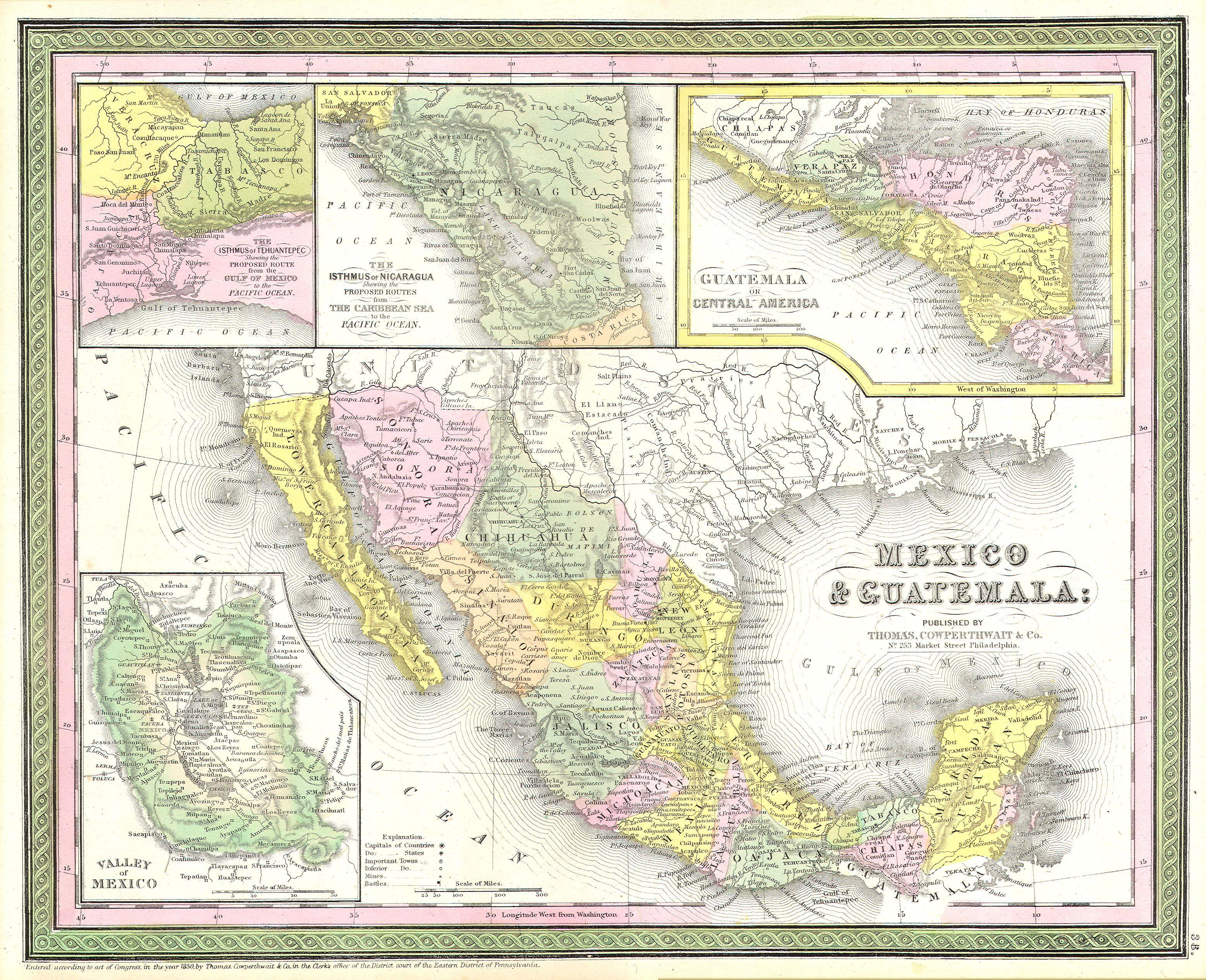
1850 map: Baja California Territory in yellow (left).

Baja California Territory (Territorio de Baja California) was a federal territory of Mexico that existed from 1824 to 1853, and 1854 to 1931; it encompassed the Baja California peninsula of present-day northwestern part of the country. It replaced the Baja California Province (1773–1824) of the Spanish colonial Viceroyalty of New Spain, after Mexican independence. Along with Alta California, the two territories were split from the Spanish Californias region.

In 1931, Baja California Territory was divided into the "Territory of Baja California Norte" and the "Territory of Baja California Sur". In 1952, the "North Territory" became the 29th State of Mexico as Baja California. In 1974, the "South Territory" became the 31st state as Baja California Sur.

== Province ==
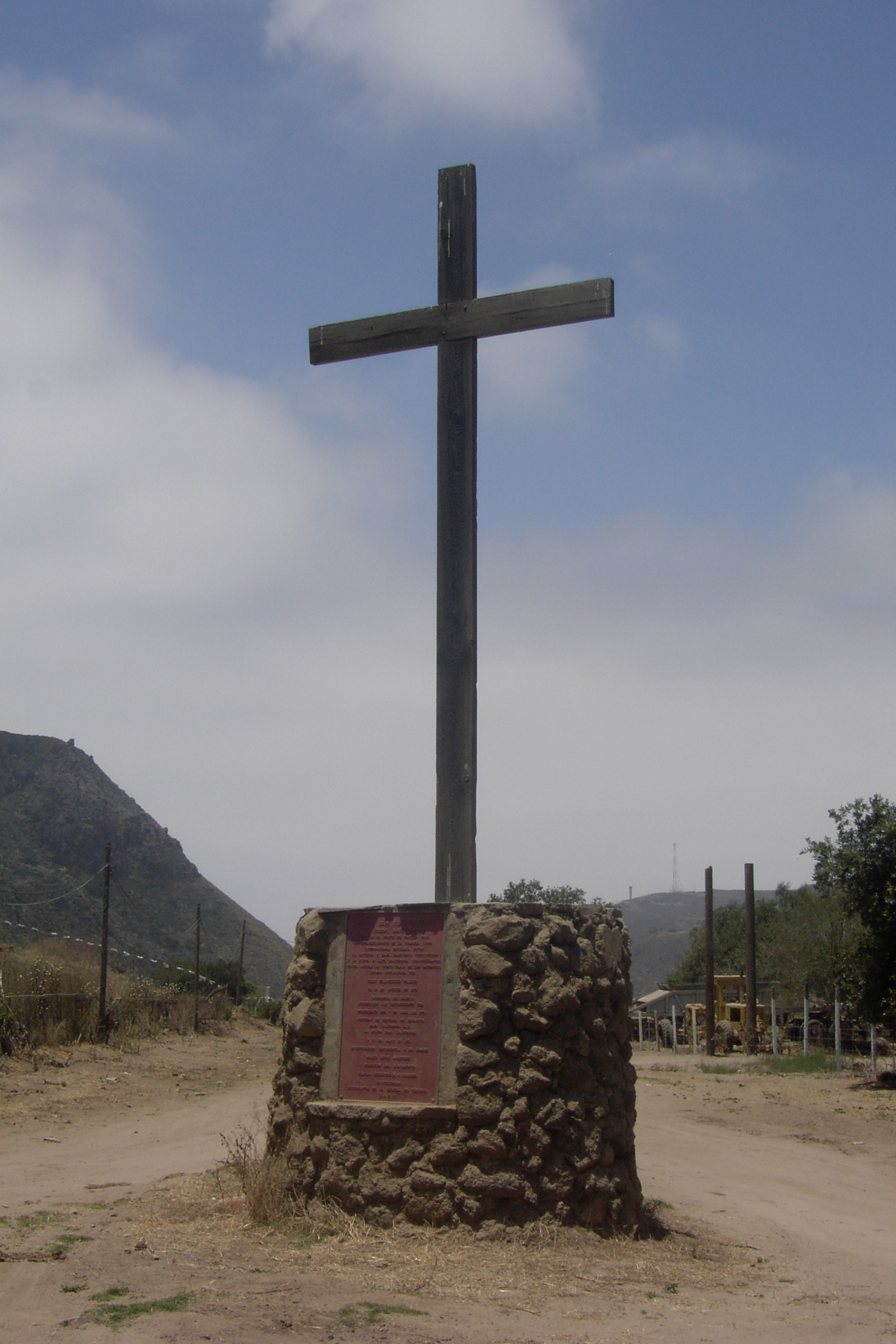
Marker of the historical northern border with Alta California

Baja California's northern border with Alta California was first established to demarcate areas of Franciscan and Dominican missionary authority, precisely set on August 19, 1773, near San Juan Bautista Creek by Fray Francisco Palóu. A marker stands on the line formerly dividing the two countries. The marker is behind the ruins of Misión San Miguel Arcángel de la Frontera, in La Misión, Baja California. The Palóu line was adopted as the provincial dividing line in 1804.

In 1848, under the Treaty of Guadalupe Hidalgo, this international border was shifted further north to San Diego Bay, adjusting it to the claim of Juan Rodríguez Cabrillo and the "sea-to-sea" claims of Sir Francis Drake and of the former colony of South Carolina.

Translated into English, the inscription on the marker reads:

San Juan Bautista Creek: Juan Crespí, May 1 for the setting of the first international division line between Old or Lower California (Dominicans) and New or Upper California (Franciscans) five leagues to the north (Valley of the Médanos) being established by: Priest Francisco Palóu on 19 August 1773 (Mojonera of Palou) in compliance with the instructions put forth on the April 7, 1772 Concordato.
Rosarito Historical Society, Baja California A.C. at The Mission, Baja California, on 20 May 1990. Fieldwork and research: . Monument donation: Mario Reyes Coronado De Villasari & family . Construction: Students of the School of Tourism at U.A.B.C.(Autonomous University of Baja California).

== See also ==
- Las Californias Province – Spanish colonial period, 1768–1804.
- Baja California Province – Spanish colonial period, 1804–1824.
- Alta California territory – 1824–1846, present-day California, Nevada, New Mexico, and Utah.
- Spanish missions in Baja California
- Viceroyalty of New Spain–related topics
