= Coat of arms of Baja California Sur =

Seal of the Free and Sovereign State of Baja California Sur
- Armiger: State of Baja California Sur
- Adopted: 1975
- Shield: Per Pale: Or and Gules. A schallop surmounted Argent. Bordure Azure, four fish Argent: one in chief, another in base, one dexter and one sinister

The coat of arms of Baja California Sur was adopted in 1975, a year after it became a state as it was previously a territory.

== History ==
Spanish colonial coat of arms of Las Californias.

The coat of arms of Baja California is based on the colonial coat of arms granted to the Province of Las Californias by the Spanish Empire.

== Description ==
The Coat of arms Baja California Sur consists of a Or and Gules field. A schallop surmounted Argent. Bordure Azure, four fish Argent: one in chief, another in base, one dexter and one sinister.

== See also ==
- Coat of arms of Mexico
- Flag of Baja California Sur
