= Flag of Baja California Sur =

- Use: Civil and state flag
- Proportion: 4:7
- Adopted: December 31, 2017
- Design: Solid white with the Baja California Sur coat of arms in the center.

The Flag of Baja California Sur is the flag used by the Mexican state of Baja California Sur. The flag was adopted December 31, 2017. The State Flag consists of a white rectangle with a ratio of four to seven between the width and length; in the center it bears the State Coat of arms, placed in such a way that it occupies three-quarters of the width.

== History ==
The first appearance of a flag was when William Walker carried out his first action in the city of La Paz in Baja California Peninsula, where he raised a flag that represented the Territory of Lower California. There he proclaimed, on November 3, 1853, that the Republic of Lower California was free, sovereign, and independent. The first flag was represented by a blue star in a white central canton that symbolizes the state of the new republic with two red strips divided by an orange parallel.

William Walker proclaimed himself president of the Republic of Sonora on January 18, 1854, and the new republic was divided into two states, Baja California and Sonora, the latter governed by the Civil Code in force in Louisiana. The second flag consists of 3 horizontal stripes, red, white and red respectively, in the central part of the white stripe is two stars represented by Baja California and Sonora states.

The first flag of the state of Baja California Sur was officially adopted in 2017, it is a white banner with the entity's coat of arms.

=== Historical flags ===
Flag of the Republic of Lower California (1853)

Flag of the Republic of Sonora (1854)
