= Departments of the Second Mexican Empire =

Administrative divisions of the Second Mexican Empire

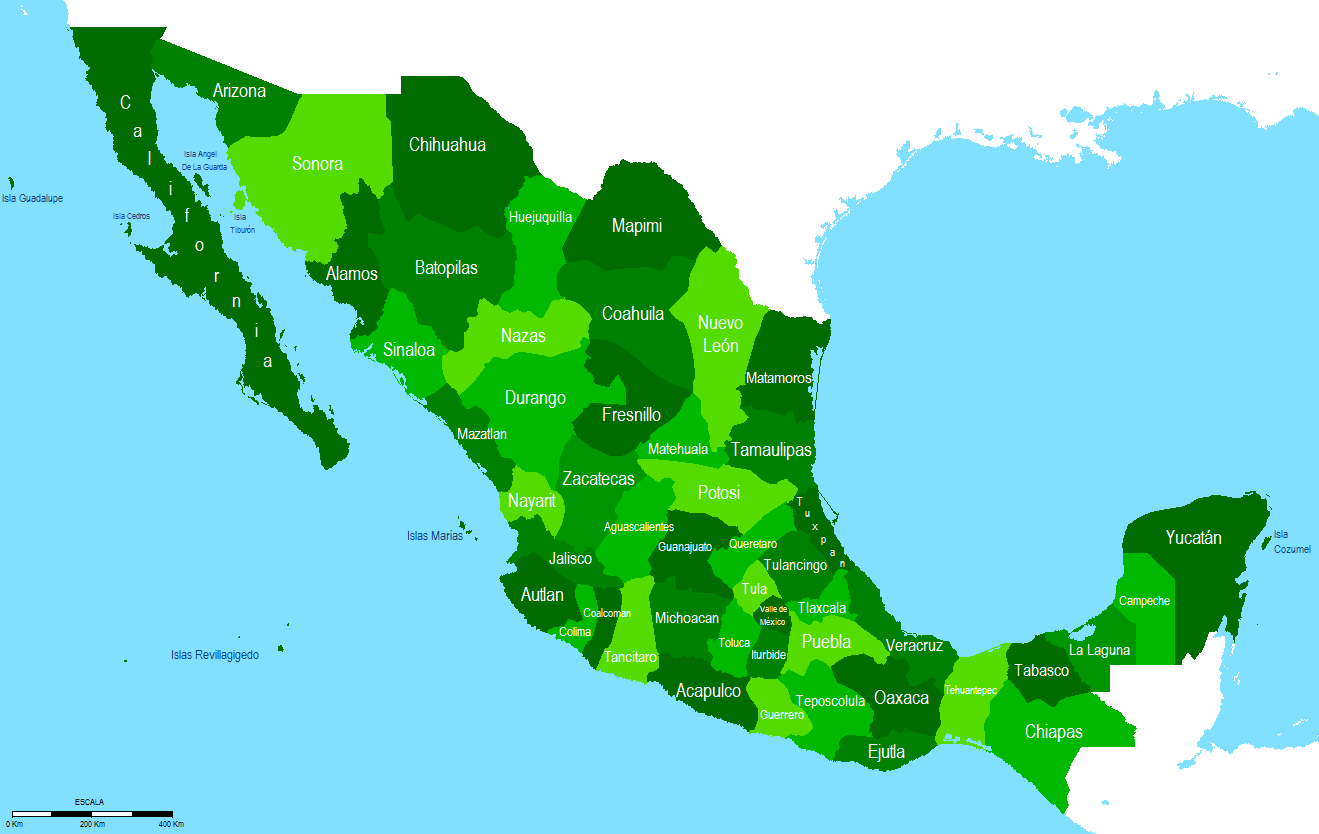
The fifty departments of the Mexican Empire

The departments of the Second Mexican Empire were the administrative divisions that the nation was organized into during the short rule of Emperor Maximilian I. He commissioned Mexican scholar Manuel Orozco y Berra to draw boundaries based on geography of Mexico. Each of the 50 departments was to be governed by a prefect. There were many new departments in the plan, carved out of existing Mexican states: Acapulco, Álamos, Arizona, Autlán, Batopilas, Coalcomán, Ejutla, Fresnillo, Huejuquilla, Iturbide, La Laguna, Mapimí, Matamoros, Matehuala, Mazatlán, Nazas, El Potosí, Tancítaro, Tehuantepec, Teposcolula, Toluca, Tula, Tulancingo, Tuxpan, and Valle de México (Mexico City). This plan was never implemented in full before the fall of Maximilian's regime and the return of republican rule under President Benito Juárez.

== List of departments ==
Population by department
| Number | Department | Total population | Capital | Prefect | Population | Surface (Sq Leagues) | Pop. Density |
|---|---|---|---|---|---|---|---|
| XXL | Acapulco | 97,949 | Acapulco | | 3,000 | 1,965 | 49.85 |
| XXX | Aguascalientes | 433,151 | Aguascalientes | Francisco R. de Esparza | 23,000 | 1,768 | 244.99 |
| XLIV | Álamos | 41,041 | Álamos | | 6,000 | 2,657 | 15.45 |
| XLVI | Arizona | 25,603 | Altar | José Moreno Bustamante | 1,000 | 4,852 | 5.28 |
| XXVII | Autlán | 82,624 | Autlán | | 3,000 | 1,394 | 59.27 |
| XLVIII | Batopilas | 71,481 | Hidalgo | | 3,000 | 2,967 | 24.09 |
| L | California | 12,420 | La Paz | | 500 | 8,437 | 1.47 |
| II | Campeche | 126,368 | Campeche | Manuel Ramos | 15,500 | 2,975 | 42.48 |
| V | Chiapas | 157,317 | San Cristóbal de las Casas | | 10,500 | 1,871 | 84.08 |
| XLIX | Chihuahua | 65,824 | Chihuahua | Luis Terrazas | 12,000 | 5,341 | 12.32 |
| XXXVIII | Coahuila | 63,178 | Saltillo | Francisco de la Peña y Fuentes | 9,000 | 3,996 | 15.81 |
| XXIV | Coalcomán | 96,450 | Coalcomán | Antonio Pallares | 3,000 | 993 | 97.13 |
| XXV | Colima | 136,733 | Colima | José María Mendoza | 31,000 | 1,131 | 120.90 |
| XLII | Durango | 103,608 | Durango | Buenaventura G. Saravia | 14,000 | 3,394 | 30.53 |
| VIII | Ejutla | 93,675 | Ejutla | | 7,128 | 1,157 | 80.96 |
| XXXII | Fresnillo | 82,860 | Fresnillo | Mariano Rodríguez | 12,000 | 2,299 | 36.04 |
| XXIX | Guanajuato | 601,850 | Guanajuato | | 63,000 | 1,452 | 414.50 |
| XX | Guerrero | 124,836 | Chilpancingo | | 3,000 | 1,668 | 74.84 |
| XLVII | Huejuquilla | 16,092 | Jiménez | | 3,000 | 4,479 | 3.59 |
| XVIII | Iturbide | 157,619 | Taxco | Francisco Casanova | 5,000 | 833 | 189.22 |
| XXVI | Jalisco | 219,987 | Guadalajara | Mariano Morett | 70,000 | 1,252 | 175.71 |
| III | La Laguna | 47,000 | El Carmen | Manuel Maria Sandoval | 5,000 | 1,685 | 27.89 |
| XXXIX | Mapimí | 6,777 | San Fernando de Rosas | | 1,000 | 4,528 | 1.50 |
| XXXVI | Matamoros | 41,000 | Matamoros | Pedro J. de la Garza | 41,000 | 2,195 | 18.68 |
| XXXIV | Matehuala | 82,427 | Matehuala | | 3,500 | 2,097 | 39.31 |
| XL | Mazatlán | 94,387 | Mazatlán | Gregorio Almeda | 15,000 | 2,116 | 44.61 |
| XXII | Michoacán | 417,378 | Morelia | Ramon Mendez | 25,000 | 1,750 | 238.5 |
| XXVIII | Nayarit | 78,605 | Acaponeta | Manuel Rivas | 2,000 | 1,718 | 45.75 |
| XLIII | Nazas | 46,495 | Indé | | 5,000 | 3,089 | 15.05 |
| XXXVII | Nuevo León | 152,645 | Monterrey | Jose Maria Garcia | 14,000 | 2,379 | 64.16 |
| VII | Oaxaca | 235,845 | Oaxaca | Juan P Franco | 25,000 | 1,839 | 128.25 |
| XXXIII | El Potosí | 308,116 | San Luis Potosí | | 34,000 | 2,166 | 142.25 |
| XII | Puebla | 467,788 | Puebla | Alonso Manuel Peon | 75,000 | 1,141 | 409.98 |
| XIX | Querétaro | 273,515 | Querétaro | Manuel Gutiérrez | 48,000 | 946 | 289.13 |
| XLI | Sinaloa | 82,185 | Culiacán | | 9,000 | 2,576 | 31.90 |
| XLV | Sonora | 80,129 | Ures | Santiago Campillo | 7,000 | 4,198 | 19.09 |
| IV | Tabasco | 99,930 | San Juan Bautista | | 6,000 | 1,905 | 52.46 |
| XXXV | Tamaulipas | 71,470 | Ciudad Victoria | José de Emparan | 6,000 | 1,969 | 36.30 |
| XXIII | Tancítaro | 179,100 | Tancítaro | | 2,000 | 1,194 | 150.00 |
| VI | Tehuantepec | 85,275 | El Suchil | Luciano Prieto | - | 1,999 | 42.66 |
| IX | Teposcolula | 160,720 | Teposcolula | | 1,200 | 1,352 | 118.88 |
| XIII | Tlaxcala | 339,571 | Tlaxcala | Bibiano Beltran | 4,000 | 1,030 | 329.68 |
| XVII | Toluca | 311,853 | Toluca | González Fuentes | 12,000 | 1,095 | 284.80 |
| XVI | Tula | 178,174 | Tula | Eligio Ruelas | 5,000 | 617 | 288.77 |
| XV | Tulancingo | 266,678 | Tulancingo | Agustín Ricoy | 6,000 | 1,030 | 258.91 |
| XI | Tuxpan | 97,940 | Tuxpan | | 6,000 | 1,325 | 73.92 |
| XIV | Valle de México | 481,796 | Mexico | José María Mendoza | 200,000 | 410 | 1,175.11 |
| X | Veracruz | 265,159 | Veracruz | Domingo Bureau | 10,000 | 2,119 | 125.13 |
| I | Yucatán | 263,547 | Mérida | José García Jurado | 24,000 | 4,902 | 53.76 |
| XXXI | Zacatecas | 192,823 | Zacatecas | José María Avila | 16,000 | 1,785 | 108.02 |

The information from this table was the estimate for the year 1865.

== See also ==
- Administrative divisions of Mexico
- Territories of Mexico
- Territorial evolution of Mexico
