= Villa Alberto Andrés Alvarado Arámburo =

- Locality
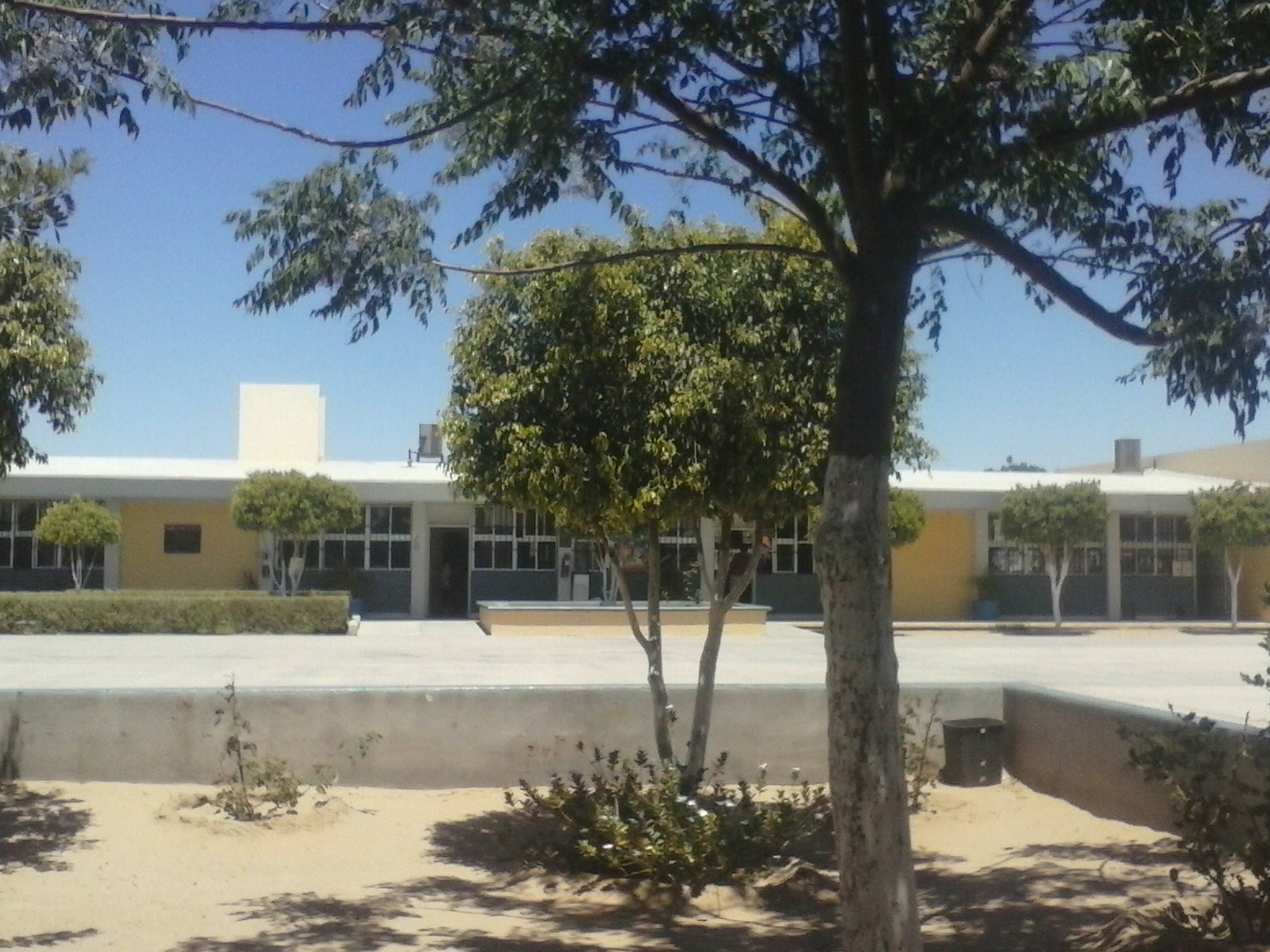
- Local school

- Location in Baja California Sur Villa Alberto Andrés Alvarado Arámburo (Mexico)
- Coordinates: 27°38′40″N 113°23′05″W
- Country: Mexico
- State: Baja California Sur
- Municipality: Mulegé

Population (2020)
  - Total: 10,897

Villa Alberto Andrés Alvarado Arámburo is a settlement in northern Baja California Sur. It is named for the former governor of Baja California Sur, Alberto Alvarado Arámburo. It is located on Mexican Federal Highway 1 which runs through the peninsula.
