= Julián Abitia =

Mexican revolutionary and politician (1854–1934)

Julián Abitia (1857–1934) was a Mexican soldier and politician. In 1913, he joined General Álvaro Obregón's forces in the Mexican Revolution. In 1920, he did not recognize Venustiano Carranza's government. He was governor of Baja California Sur and then Quintana Roo. He was made colonel of infantry on 11 April 1924. In 1927, he lived in Gustavo A. Madero, Mexico City.

== Sources ==
Bibliography

- Naranjo, Francisco (1935). Diccionario biográfico Revolucionario (Imprenta Editorial "Cosmos" ed.). Mexico.
