= Aguascalientes Department =

Department of the Second Mexican Empire

Departamento de Aguascalientes
- Department of the Second Mexican Empire
- 1865–1867
- Location of the Aguascalientes Department (red) in the Second Mexican Empire.
- Capital: Aguascalientes
- Population
- 433,151 (1,865)
  - Type: Empire
- Historical era: Second French intervention in Mexico
  - Established: 1865
  - Disestablished: 1867
Preceded by
Aguascalientes
Jalisco
Zacatecas
Succeeded by
Aguascalientes
Jalisco
Zacatecas
- Today part of: Mexico

The Aguascalientes Department (1865−1867) was a department of the Second Mexican Empire, located in the present-day states of Aguascalientes, Jalisco, and Zacatecas in Central Mexico.

It was established by an imperial decree on March 3, 1865, which specified:

Department of Aguascalientes. It is bordered to the north by the Departments of Potosí and Zacatecas, serving as boundaries the formerly recognized between the extinct [States] of Aguascalientes and Zacatecas, and between those of Jalisco, San Luis Potosí and Zacatecas. To the East with the Department of Guanajuato, within the limits set to it, towards the West. To the south with the Departments of Tancítaro, Coalcomán and Jalisco, from which it is separated by the Lerma River, until its mouth in the Lake Chapala, its shore and the Grande or Tololotlán River, from its exit from the Lake as far as the Juchipila River meets it. To the west with the Department of Zacatecas, serving as a dividing line the current of the Juchipila River, from the North of the town of Tabasco to its meeting with the Río Grande or Tololotlán.

The Aguascalientes Department was one of the fifty departments of the Second Mexican Empire, and was administered by the prefect Francisco R. de Esparza. The population of the department in the year 1865 was 433,151, meaning that it was the fourth-most populous department behind Puebla (3rd), Valle de México (2nd), and Guanajuato (1st).
