= California Department =

Department of the Second Mexican Empire

Departamento de California
- Department of the Second Mexican Empire
- 1865–1867
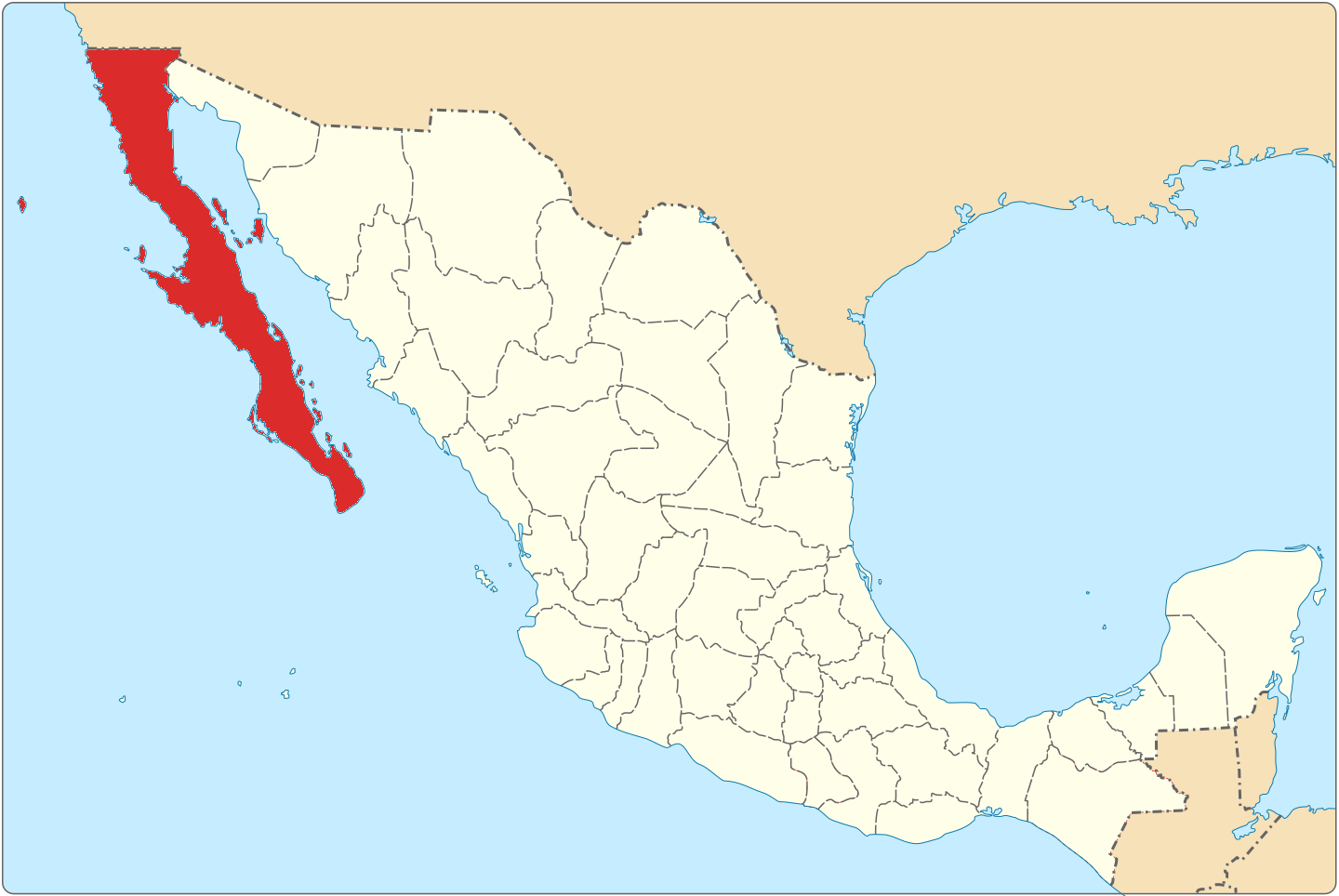
- Location of the California Department (red) in the Second Mexican Empire.
- Capital: La Paz
  - Type: Empire
- Historical era: Second French intervention in Mexico
  - Established: 1865
  - Disestablished: 1867
Preceded by	Succeeded by
Baja California Territory	Baja California Territory
- Today part of: Mexico

The California Department (1865−1867) was a department of the Second Mexican Empire, located in Northwestern Mexico.

The department included all the Baja California peninsula. It did not include any of the former Alta California (the present-day U.S. state of California), which was ceded to the U.S. in 1848 under the Treaty of Guadalupe Hidalgo.

It was established by an imperial decree on March 3, 1865, which specified:

Department of California. Confined on the north with the United States. To the east with the Department of Arizona, from which it is separated by the Colorado River, and with the Sea of Cortez. To the south and west with the Pacific Ocean. All the islands that in both seas in fact and law correspond and should have corresponded to Mexico remain within its jurisdiction. Its capital shall be the port of La Paz.

The present-day Mexican states of Baja California and Baja California Sur are located where the department was.
