= Arizona Department =

Department of the Second Mexican Empire

Coordinates: 30.629°N 110.855°W

Departamento de Arizona
- Department of the Second Mexican Empire
- 1865—1867
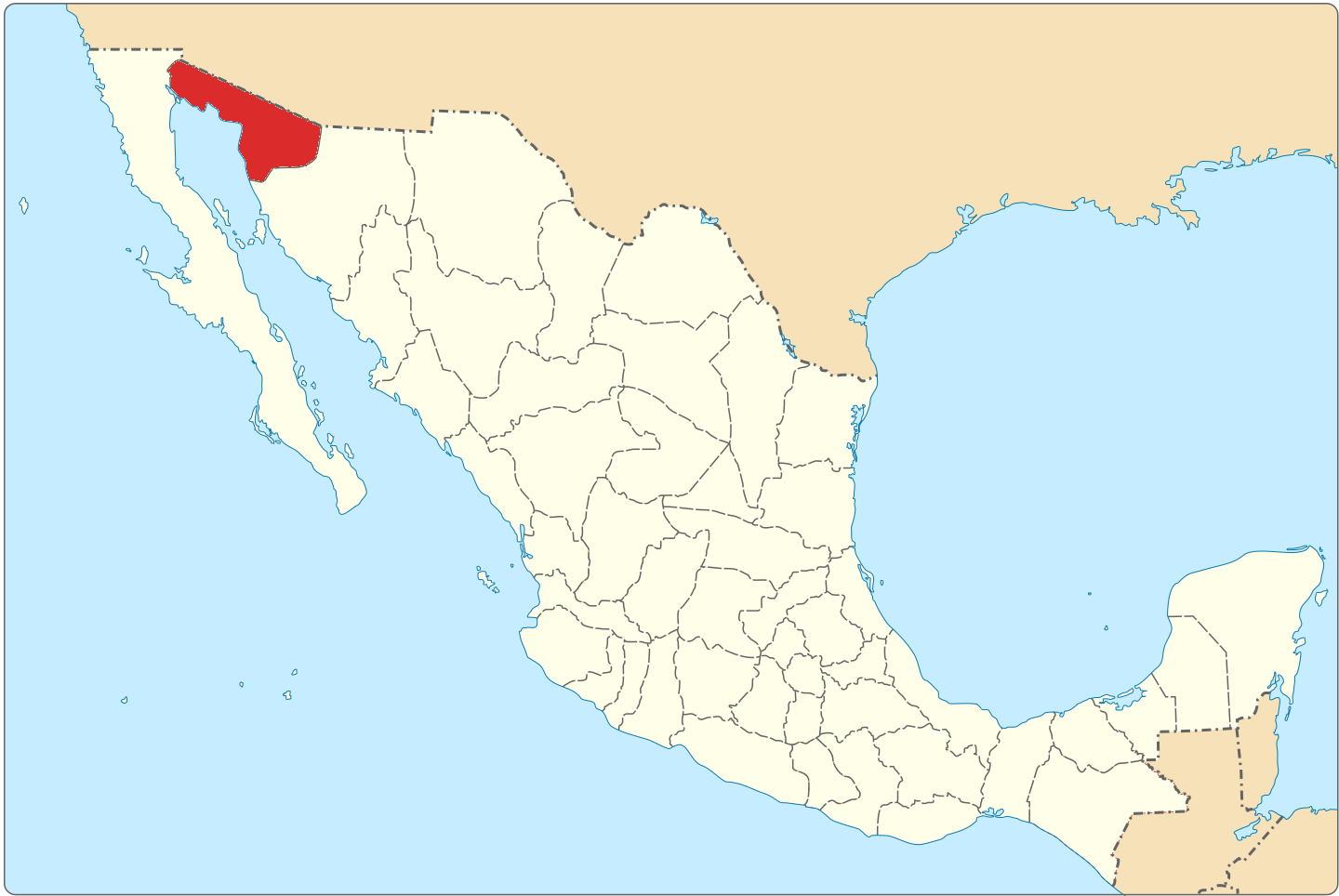
- Location of the Arizona Department (red) in the Second Mexican Empire.
- Capital: Altar
- Population
- 25,603 (1,865)
  - Type: Empire
- Historical era: Second French intervention in Mexico
  - Established: 1865
  - Disestablished: 1867
Preceded by	Succeeded by
Sonora	Sonora
- Today part of: Mexico

The Arizona Department (1865—1867) was a department of the Second Mexican Empire, located in the present-day state of Sonora in Northwestern Mexico.

It was established by an imperial decree on March 3, 1865, which specified:

Department of Arizona. Confined on the north with the United States. To the east and the south by the Department of Sonora. To the west by the Sea of Cortez and with the Department of California from which it is divided by the Colorado River. Its capital shall be Altar.

It was directly south of the U.S. Arizona Territory, the present-day U.S. state of Arizona. It was one among the 50 departments of the Second Mexican Empire and was administered by the prefect José Moreno Bustamante. The population of the department in the year 1865 was 25,603.
