= Territory of Baja California Norte =

Mexican federal territory (1931–1952)

Territory of Baja California Norte Territorio Norte de Baja California
- Territory of Mexico
- 1931–1952
- Location of the Territory of Baja California Norte (red) in Mexico.
- Capital: Mexicali
- Government
  - Type: Territory of Mexico
- Territorial governor
  - 1947–1952: Alfonso García González (last)
- History
  - Established: 1931
  - Statehood: 16 January 1952
Preceded by	Succeeded by
Baja California Territory	Baja California

The Territory of Baja California Norte was a federal territory of Mexico that existed between 1931 and 1952. Its former area currently comprises the state of Baja California, located in the northern part of the Baja California peninsula.

== History ==
In December 1930, the Mexican Congress amended Article 43 of the Constitution, thus splitting the Baja California Territory into two territories: the Territory of Baja California Norte and the Territory of Baja California Sur. The border between the two was defined as the 28th parallel north.

== Statehood ==
Beginning in 1939, several political groups that promoted the conversion of the Baja territory into a state of Mexico were created. On 15 November 1951, President Miguel Alemán Valdés sent Congress a proposed amendment to Articles 43 and 45 of the constitution to transform the Territory of Baja California Norte into the Free and Sovereign State of Baja California. The decree was approved on 31 December 1951 and was published in the Official Journal of the Federation on 16 January 1952. The last territorial governor, Alfonso García González, was appointed provisional governor of the newly created state.

== Sources ==
- Britannica – Baja California
