= Territory of Baja California Sur =

Mexican federal territory (1931–1974)

Territory of Baja California Sur Territorio Sur de Baja California
- Territory of Mexico
- 1931–1974
- Location of the Territory of Baja California Sur (red) in Mexico.
- Capital: La Paz
- Government
  - Type: Territory of Mexico
- Territorial governor
  - 1970–1974: Félix Agramont Cota (last)
- History
  - Established: 1931
  - Statehood: 8 October 1974
Preceded by	Succeeded by
Baja California Territory	Baja California Sur

The Territory of Baja California Sur was a federal territory of Mexico that existed between 1931 and 1974. Its former area currently comprises the state of Baja California Sur, located in the southern part of the Baja California peninsula.

== History ==
In December 1930, the Mexican Congress amended Article 43 of the Constitution, thus splitting the Baja California Territory into two territories: the Territory of Baja California Norte and the Territory of Baja California Sur. The border between the two was defined as the 28th parallel north.

== Statehood ==
The life of the territory was governed by strong political-social movements that sought to obtain the status of a state of Mexico, an objective that was achieved in 1974. The decree on transforming the Territory of Baja California Sur into the Free and Sovereign State of Baja California Sur was published in the Official Journal of the Federation on 8 October 1974. The last territorial governor, Félix Agramont Cota, was appointed provisional governor of the newly created state.

Likewise, the policies of the federal and territorial governments sought to integrate populationally and economically the region to the rest of the country, using for this the colonization and agricultural development as well as a preferential tariff regime that facilitated foreign imports in the territory. Part of the settlement strategy was also supported by a large investment in infrastructure, public services, education, tourism, and other primary economic activities.

== Sources ==
- Britannica – Baja California Sur
