= Republic of Sonora =

Former Federal Republic in Northern Mexico, 1854

Republic of Baja California and Sonora República de Baja California y Sonora
- 1854
- Flag

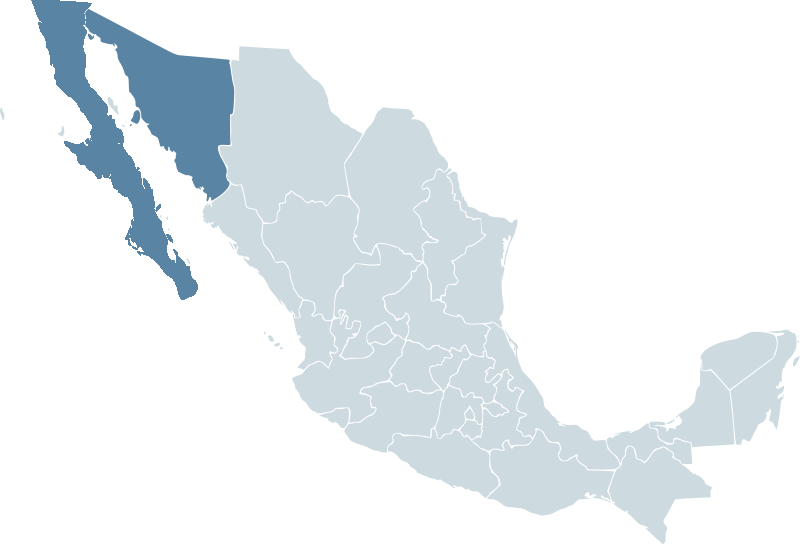
- Status: Unrecognized state
- Capital: La Paz, Baja California
- Government: Republic under a military dictatorship
  - President: William Walker
- History
  - Independence: January 21, 1854
  - Disestablished: May 8, 1854
Preceded by	Succeeded by
Sonora; Republic of Baja California	Sonora; Baja California Territory
- Today part of: Mexico: Baja California; Baja California Sur; Sonora

The Republic of Baja California and Sonora, simply known as the Republic of Sonora, was a short-lived, unrecognized federal republic ruled by filibuster William Walker in 1854. It was based in Baja California and also claimed (but never controlled) Sonora. Walker's actions generated interest back in San Francisco, where bonds for the Republic of Sonora were sold, and its flag was even raised in places. However, Walker's enterprise suffered from a lack of supplies and discontent from within, and the Mexican government quickly forced Walker to retreat.

== History ==
In the summer of 1853, an American adventurer and filibuster named William Walker traveled to Guaymas seeking a grant from the government of Mexico to create a colony that would serve as a fortified frontier, protecting US soil from raids by Native Americans. Mexico refused, and Walker returned to San Francisco determined to obtain his colony anyway. He began recruiting American supporters of slavery and Manifest Destiny, mostly inhabitants of Kentucky and Tennessee. His proposed buffer colony turned into plans to establish the independent Republic of Sonora as a part of the American Union, like the Republic of Texas. He funded his project by "selling scripts which were redeemable in lands of Sonora."

On October 15, 1853, Walker set out with 45 men to invade and conquer the Mexican territories of Baja California and Sonora. He succeeded in capturing La Paz, the capital of sparsely populated Baja California, and declared the Republic of Baja California, with himself as president and his partner, Henry P. Watkins, as vice president. He then put the region under the laws of the American state of Louisiana, where slavery remained legal in 1854. He declared independence from Mexico on January 10, 1854. Fearful of attacks by Mexico, Walker moved his position twice over the next three months, first to Cabo San Lucas, and then further north to Ensenada to maintain a more secure position of operations. He never gained control of Sonora but three months later, he pronounced Baja California part of a larger Republic of Sonora.

Walker's actions generated large amounts of interest back in San Francisco, where bonds for the Republic of Sonora were sold and its flag was even raised in places. However, Walker was never able to take advantage of his project's popularity. A serious lack of supplies, severe aridity of Baja California, discontent within his party and a swift reaction by the Mexican government quickly forced Walker to retreat.

Back in California, Walker was put on trial for conducting an illegal war. The judge indicated that Walker was guilty of violating the peace treaty agreed upon by the United States and Mexico after the Mexican–American War (1846–48). However, it was the era of Manifest Destiny, and, consequently, his filibustering project was popular in the southern and western United States. Because of this, the jury took only eight minutes to acquit him.

== Government ==
The Republic of Sonora did not use the same civil code that it had when it was a Mexican state, but rather used that of the Republic of Baja California, which used that of the State of Louisiana. In November 1853, President Walker said: "From now on and henceforth to this date, the civil code and the code of procedures of the state of Louisiana will be followed for the government and law as long as the courts of the republic are organized."

Louisiana's civil code had been chosen because it had slave legislation, since its true purpose of "the new republic" was to bring it into the American union as another slave state. This decree is considered an indicator of the political situation of Walker's filibuster project, and probably does not refer to the fact that the concrete objective was to introduce slaves into the new republic from Africa or from some of the former Antillean colonies.

== See also ==
- Crabb Massacre
- Historical outline of Arizona
- Sonora
- Gadsden Purchase
- Arizona Territory (Confederate States of America)
- Traditional Arizona
- Golden Circle (proposed country)
- History of Honduras
- Filibuster War
