= Baja California Sur =

State of Mexico

- State
- Free and Sovereign State of Baja California Sur; Estado Libre y Soberano de Baja California Sur (Spanish)
- Flag Coat of arms
- Nickname: El Acuario Del Mundo (The aquarium of the world)
- Anthem: Orgullo Sudcaliforniano
- Baja California Sur within Mexico
- Coordinates: 25.44°N 111.88°W
- Country: Mexico
- Capital and largest city: La Paz
- Municipalities: 5
- Before statehood: Territory of Baja California Sur
- Admission: 8 October 1974
- Order: 31st

Government
  - Governor: Víctor Manuel Castro Cosío (Morena)
  - Senators: Ricardo Velázquez Meza (Morena); Jesús Lucía Trasviña Waldenrath (Morena); María Guadalupe Saldaña Cisneros (PAN)
  - Deputies: Federal deputies: • Marco Antonio Almendáriz Puppo (1st); • Alfredo Porras Domínguez (2nd)
  - Legislature: Congress of Baja California Sur

Area
  - Total: 73,909 km^{2} (28,536 sq mi)
- Ranked 9th
- Highest elevation: 2,080 m (6,820 ft)

Population (2020)
  - Total: 798,447
  - Rank: 31st
  - Density: 11/km^{2} (28/sq mi)
  - Rank: 32nd
- Demonym: Sudcaliforniano (a)

GDP (2022)
  - Total: MXN 262 billion (US$13.0 billion)
  - Per capita: US$15,556; 4th
- Time zone: UTC–07:00 (Zona Pacífico)
- Postal code: 23
- Area code: Area codes: • 612; • 613; • 615; • 624
- ISO 3166 code: MX-BCS
- HDI: ▲0.831 very high Ranked 4th of 32
- Website: www.bcs.gob.mx

Baja California Sur, (Note: Spanish pronunciation: [ˈbaxa kaliˈfoɾnja ˈsuɾ]; 'South Lower California') officially the Free and Sovereign State of Baja California Sur, (Note: Spanish: Estado Libre y Soberano de Baja California Sur) is a state in Mexico. It is the 31st and last state to be admitted, in 1974. It is also the least densely populated Mexican state, the second least populous, and the ninth-largest state by area.

Before becoming a state on 8 October 1974, the area was known as the El Territorio Sur de Baja California ("South Territory of Lower California"). It has an area of 73,909 km^{2} (28,536 sq mi), or 3.57% of the land mass of Mexico, and occupies the southern half of the Baja California Peninsula, south of the 28th parallel, plus the uninhabited Rocas Alijos in the Pacific Ocean. It is bordered to the north by the state of Baja California, to the west by the Pacific Ocean, and to the east by the Gulf of California. The state has maritime borders with Sonora and Sinaloa to the east, across the Gulf of California.

The state is home to the tourist resorts of Cabo San Lucas and San José del Cabo. Its largest city and capital is La Paz.

== Etymology ==
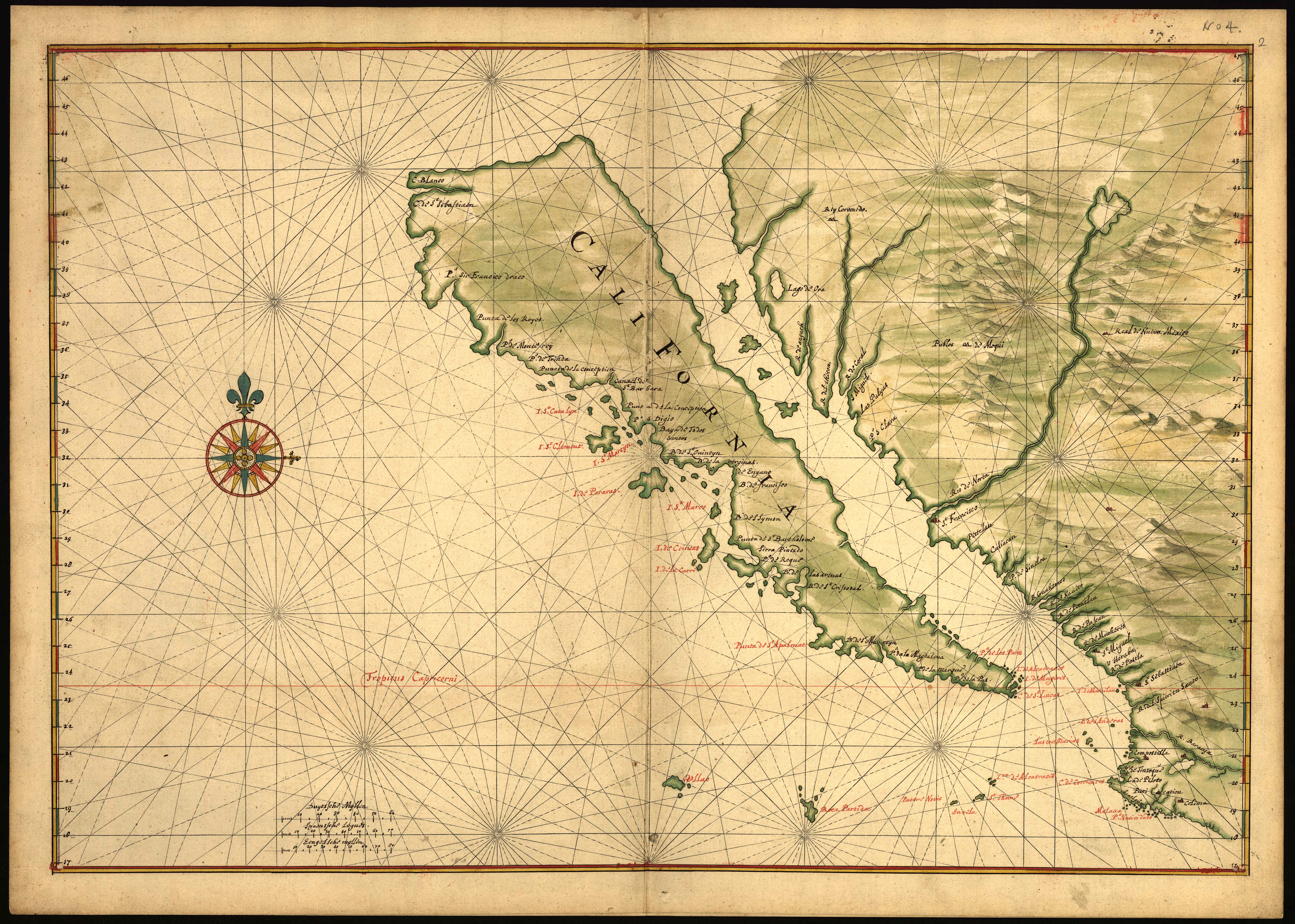
Hernán Cortés' navigator subordinate Fortún Ximénez, having led a revolt in which his captain Diego de Becerra was killed, went on to misreport the peninsula as an island and thereby helped to perpetuate a long-standing Western misconception, reflected in this anonymous Italian map of the region, circa 1650.

The first European known to have landed in Baja California was a rebel navigator named Fortún Ximénez, who killed his captain and one of the envoys of Hernán Cortés, Diego de Becerra in his sleep, while he led a revolt and ruined the entire mission. Ximénez and the accomplice crewmen still in navigation ruined the sail in the peninsula and were hostile with the Indians due to their collecting giant pearls and because explorers wanted to rape the women. This started a brawl with the Indians and Ximénez was murdered. The surviving Spanish navigators withdrew to the coast and sailed erratically for several days until they reached the shores of the present-day Jalisco, where they encountered a subaltern of Nuño de Guzmán, who disliked Cortés. He requisitioned the ship, took them prisoner, and reported mistakenly that the peninsula was an island, starting this initial European misconception. After three attempts by Hernán Cortés to colonize the area for Spain, including one mission he commanded himself, a contemporary writer cited as "Alarcón" started calling the region "California" (the name of a mythical island in a popular novel of the time, Las Sergas de Esplandián) in mockery of Cortés. The name "California" came to be applied to this peninsula along with the areas in the United States now known as the state of California and part of the state of Arizona.

In 1888, to manage mining in the region, the federal government under Porfirio Diaz divided the peninsula into two federal territories. The southern territory was named El Territorio Sur de Baja California (Spanish: South Territory of Lower California). It became the State of Baja California Sur on 8 October 1974.

== History ==
=== Pre-Columbian era ===
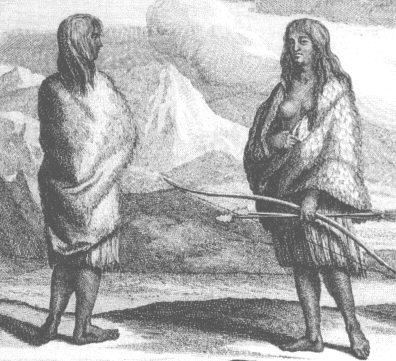
California women, probably Pericúes, 1726

Japanese archaeologist Harumi Fujita, who has been excavating the Cape Region since 1985, has carbon-dated human remains from the Babisuri Shelter on the Isla Espíritu Santo to 40,000 years ago, placing the earliest habitation in the Archaic period, though the majority of remains indicate continuous human occupation of the area beginning 10,000 to 21,000 years ago.

Evidence of human habitation is found in primitive rock and cave paintings dating to 1700 BCE that were created by hunting and gathering societies who lived in rock shelters. The state is one of five areas in the world with important concentrations of cave paintings. These paintings have an identifiable style and tend to be on a monumental scale with some figures as tall as 4 metres (13 ft). Most of the animals are painted in silhouette and depicted in movement, often being hunted by people. The best known site is the Great Mural Rock Art, which dates from 1700 BCE, located in the north of the state. Other important sites include Cueva de Palma, San Gregorio, Santa Teresa, Guadalupe, San Francisco, Cabo Pulmo, Santiago and San Borjita. The most important concentrations are in a 12-square-kilometer zone in the north of the state, centered on the Sierra de San Francisco. In sites near Comondú, Las Palmas and Cocheros, arrowheads, utensils and petroglyphs have been found. Las Palmas contains secondary burials of human bones painted with red ochre.

When the Spanish arrived, they referred to four main ethnic groups: the Pericúes in the south between Cabo San Lucas and La Paz, the Guaycuras in the area north of the Pericú to Loreto, the Monquis near Loreto, and the Cochimí in the middle of the peninsula. All were hunter/gatherers who produced pottery but were without agriculture or metalworking. They fished, but the only water transport was the rafts used by the Pericúes.

=== Colonial era ===
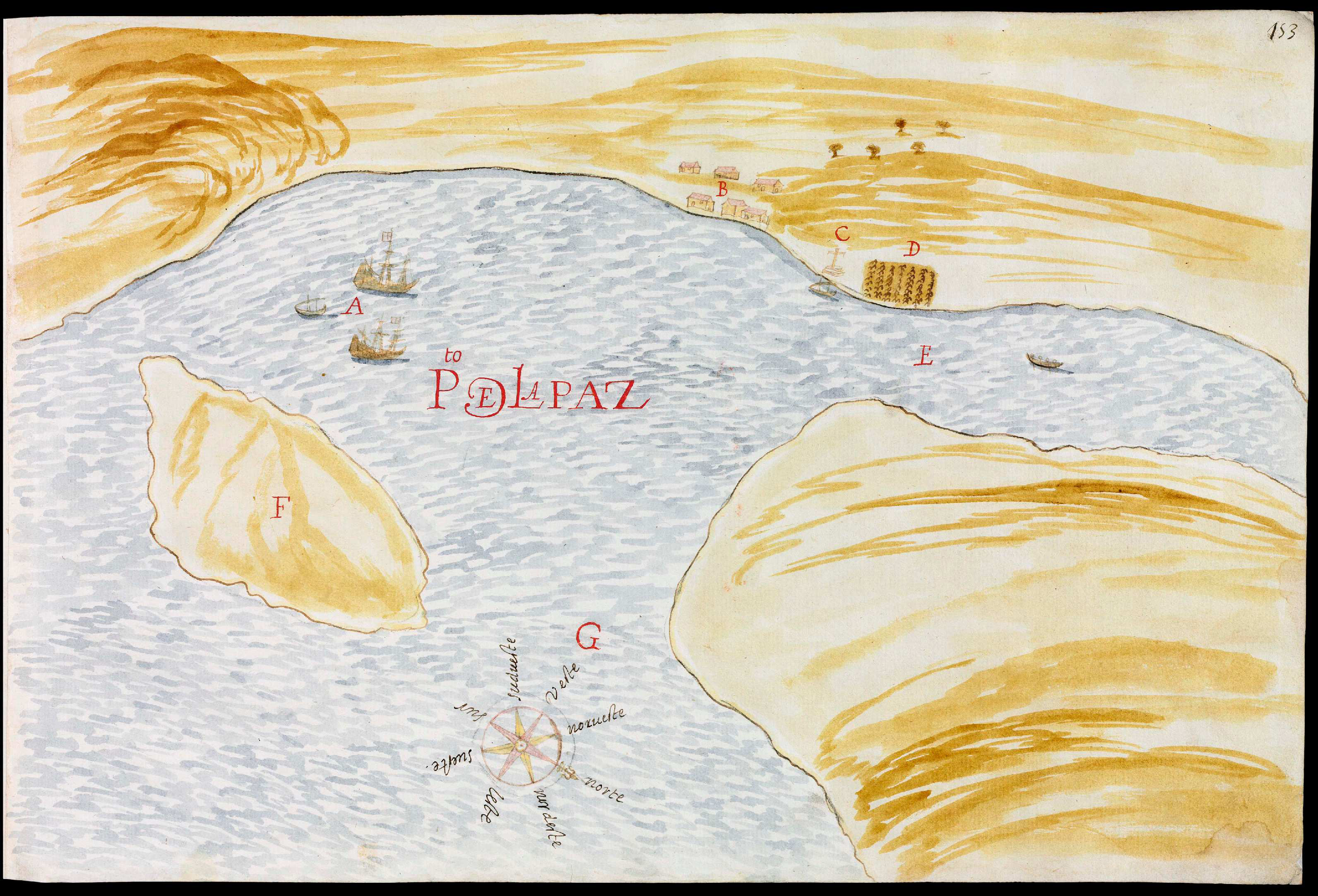
Spanish map of La Paz in 1632 written by Spanish captain Nicolás de Cardona after his expedition of 1614

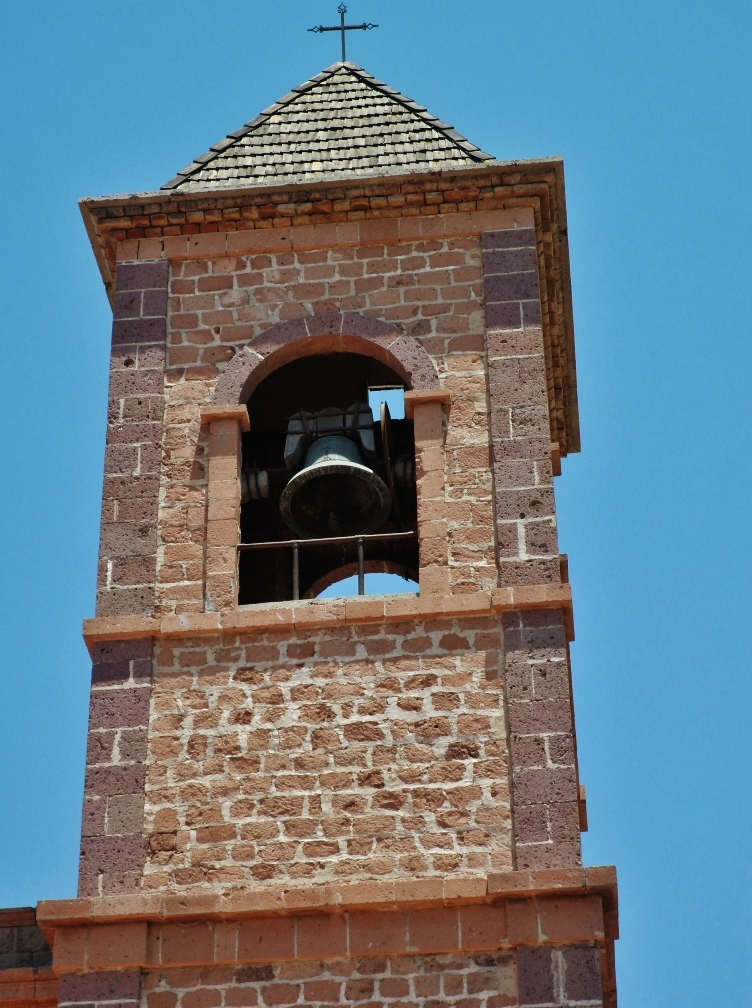
Former 18th century mission bell tower of Cathedral of La Paz, Baja California Sur

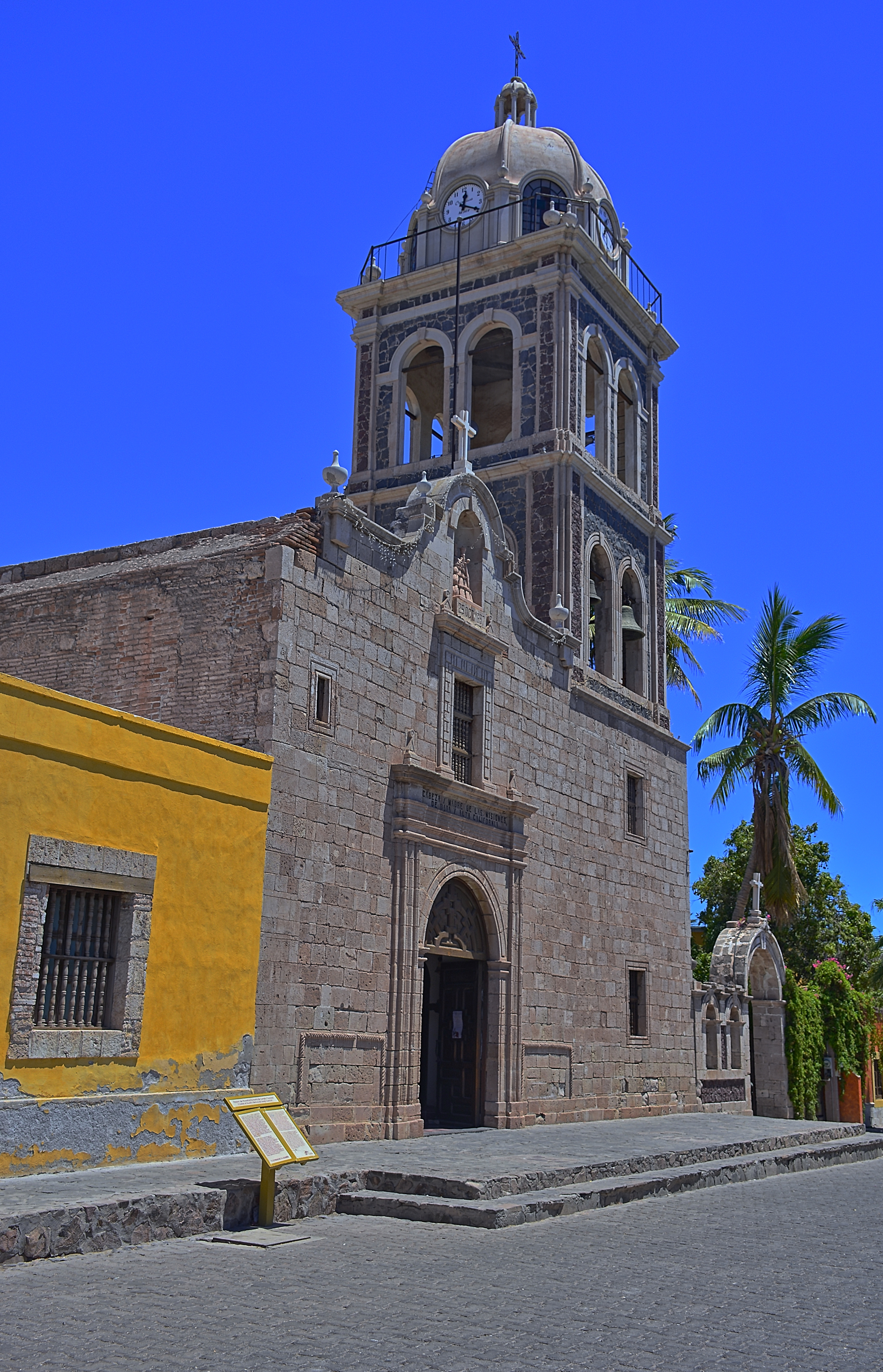
Misión de Nuestra Señora de Loreto Conchó, is the first successful of Baja California missions

The first Spaniard in the area is believed to be Fortún Ximénez, arriving in 1533. He and his crew did not remain long because their sacking of the area's pearls and abuse of the women caused a violent confrontation with the natives, who killed Ximénez. The remaining crew returned to Mexico City with the pearls and stories of riches.

In 1535, Hernán Cortés navigated into what is now known as the Gulf of California, which he called the Sea of Cortés. He landed in what is now the bay of La Paz, which he named the Santa Cruz Port and Valley. This event is celebrated in La Paz as its founding. However, he did not remain there.

Despite various explorations, the remoteness of the region deterred colonization until the 17th century. In 1697, Jesuit missionary Juan María de Salvatierra established the Nuestra Señora de Loreto Conchó Mission, the first permanent mission of its kind in Baja California Sur. From there, the order spread through most of the territory, with a total of 16 missions working among the Pericú, Guaycura, and Cochimí peoples.

During the 18th century, more colonists arrived, bringing diseases that caused a significant decrease in the indigenous population.

In 1768, the Jesuits were expelled from New Spain and the Franciscans took over the missions, continuing the expansion north. In 1773 they were replaced by the Dominicans. Some of these mission churches have survived, including the Loreto Mission, the La Paz Cathedral, the San José del Cabo Mission, and the San Javier Mission.

=== 19th century ===
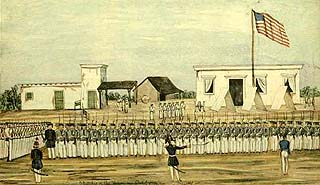
Marines raising the American flag over La Paz after the surprise Battle of La Paz near Mexican–American War end, 1847.

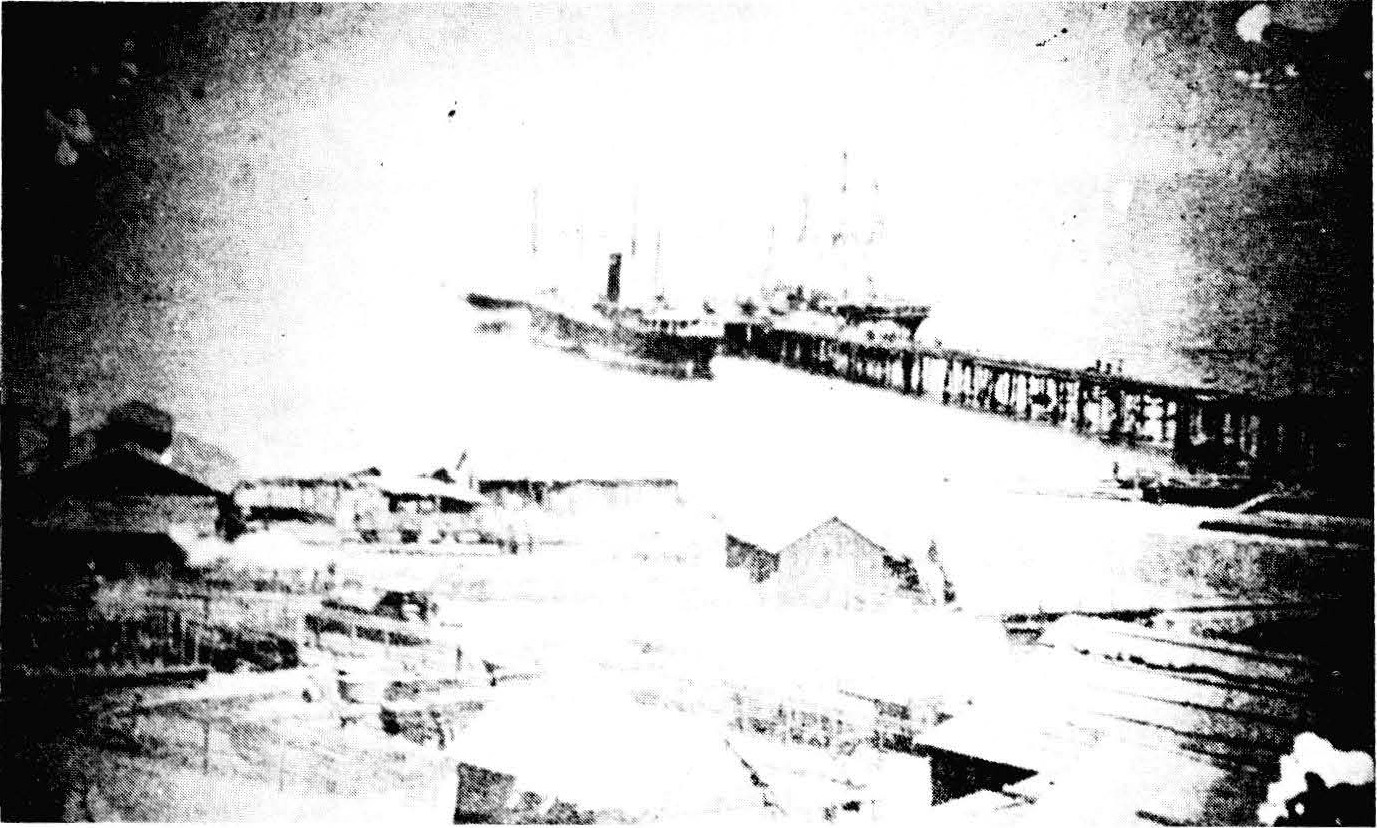
Ships docking in the waterfront of El Boleo mine in present-day Santa Rosalía.

By the start of the 19th century, the missions' influence had waned and most had closed. Many of the mission facilities had become the centers for ranching operations and some agriculture, but in the absence of the monks' protection and governmental control, the indigenous peoples were abused by the ranchers.

In the early 19th century, Baja California was divided into four municipalities: Loreto, San José del Cabo, San Pedro Mártir, and Santa Gertrudis.

The southern peninsula's isolation kept it out of the fighting during the Mexican War of Independence and allowed the Spanish to maintain control of it for a short period after the war ended in 1821. However, in 1822 Guadalupe Victoria and governor José María Echendía divided the peninsula into four municipalities.

Loreto was designated the capital of the peninsula until heavy rains destroyed the town in 1828, forcing the government to relocate to San Antonio, the birthplace of local deputy Antonio Cota. He planned to relocate the capital's functions to what was then the Port of La Paz, a transfer that was completed by 1830, and La Paz has remained the capital since then.

The United States invaded the peninsula during the Mexican–American War and sought to retain it as part of the Treaty of Guadalupe Hidalgo, but the Mexican government succeeded in keeping control of the territory. In 1853, William Walker and 45 other Americans captured La Paz but, lacking official U.S. support, they were soon driven out by Mexican forces.

During the Reform War, Liberal forces under General Manuel Marquez de Leon and others captured La Paz. French forces then invaded the country to support the Conservative cause, and Governor Felix Gilbert recognized the authority of Emperor Maximilian. However, Mexican forces under Benito Juarez forced the French out, with Coronel Clodomiro Cota recapturing the peninsula from the French.

The division of the peninsula into north and south occurred in 1888 by the federal government under Porfirio Diaz.

=== 20th century to present ===
During the regime of Porfirio Diaz (1876 to 1910), the Mexican government invited foreign enterprises to help develop the country. In Baja California, these included a major French mine called El Boleo near Santa Rosalia and the establishment of maritime routes. Diaz also divided the peninsula into two parts, each with its own government, but the northern half was designated a state and the southern half a territory, "El Territorio Sur de Baja California" (Spanish: South Territory of Lower California).

The territory was not involved in the Mexican Revolution until after the assassination of Francisco I. Madero, when local troops were organized in opposition to Victoriano Huerta, his successor under Félix Ortega. In 1914 these troops defeated federal troops and took over La Paz.

From the end of the Mexican Revolution to 1974, the territory had 10 governors appointed by the federal government. The division of the peninsula was further formalized in 1931, when a highway was extended its length. Infrastructure development remained a priority for the area, with the establishment of schools, including the first teachers' college in 1942, and projects to provide water and electricity.

The southern territory became a state on 8 October 1974, with three municipalities: La Paz, Comondú, and Mulegé. Two others have been carved out since then, Los Cabos (1981) and Loreto (1992).

== Geography ==
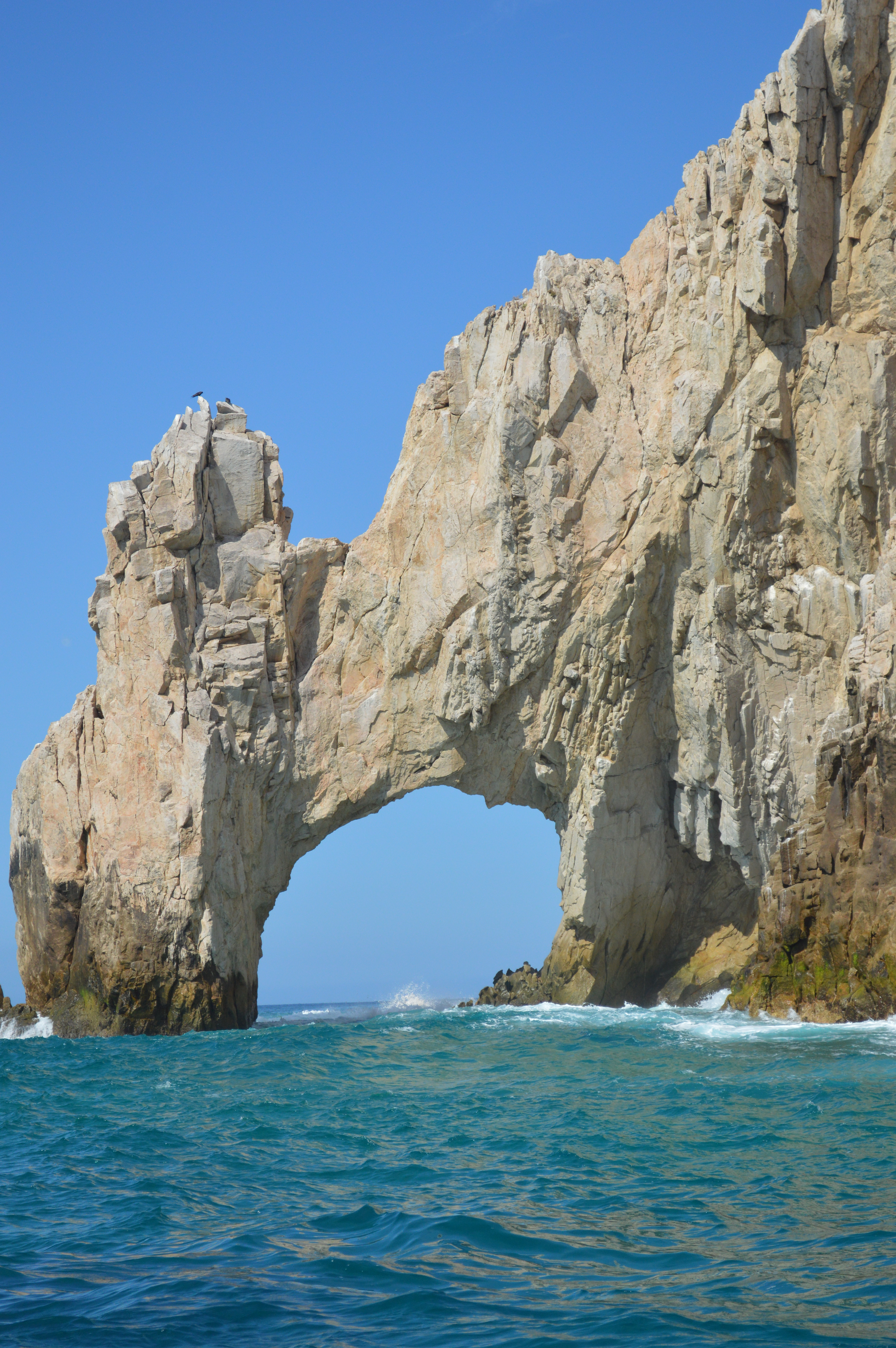
The arch at Land's End, Cabo San Lucas

The state is located on the southern part of the narrow Baja California Peninsula, which is in the northwest of Mexico and is part of the larger The Californias region of North America. The peninsula was formed about two million years ago when tectonic activity caused the land to break away from the mainland.

The state is about 750 kilometres (470 mi) long, averages about 100 kilometres (60 mi) wide, and encompasses 73,909 square kilometres or 28,536 square miles.

The territory is primarily mountains and coastal plains. The mountain ranges, which run parallel to the coastline, are of volcanic rock. The local name for the main mountain range is the Sierra de la Giganta; its highest peak is the Sierra de la Laguna, 2,080 metres or 6,824 feet above sea level. The coastal plains are significantly wider on the Pacific side, averaging about 40 kilometres (20 mi), with much wider plains such as those of Santa Clara, Berrendo, and Magdalena y Hiray. These areas are dominated by sedimentary rock, especially limestone of marine origin.

The state is divided into five regions: Central Desert, La Serranía, the Vizcaíno Desert, the Magdalena Plains, and Los Cabos. Vegetation on the Central Desert emerges during brief, irregular rains. The La Serranía is composed of high mountain areas with significant tree cover, some species of which are commercially valuable. The Vizcaíno Desert runs along the Pacific coast around the Ojo de Liebre and San Ignacio lagoons; it contains lower mountain ranges such as the San Francisco, San Alberto, Las Tinajas de Murillo, and El Serrucho, along with the El Azufre and Las Vírgenes volcanos. The Magdalena Plains is a large, flat area near the Pacific coast, and the Los Cabos region is distinguished by microclimates that are determined by the local geologic variations and rainfall patterns.

The climate of the state is dry, with an average annual temperature of 18–22 °C (64.4–71.6 °F) and average annual rainfall of less than 200 millimetres or 8 inches. Baja California's rainfall is also amongst the most variable on Earth from year to year, and the rain that does fall occurs in extremely rare but large deluges. The lower elevations are the driest and hottest, with summer daytime temperatures above 40 °C or 104 °F; wintertime temperatures may fall below freezing. The exception to desert conditions is the Los Cabos region, classified as semi-moist because of the effects of Pacific hurricane activity. In the spring, prevailing winds are from the west and in the summer from the south and southwest. In the fall, they are from the northwest, and in the winter from the north and northwest.

Most of the surface water is in the form of fast-flowing seasonal streams that form during stormy weather. Most of these drain into the Pacific Ocean, but some flow south into the Bahía de Ballenas.

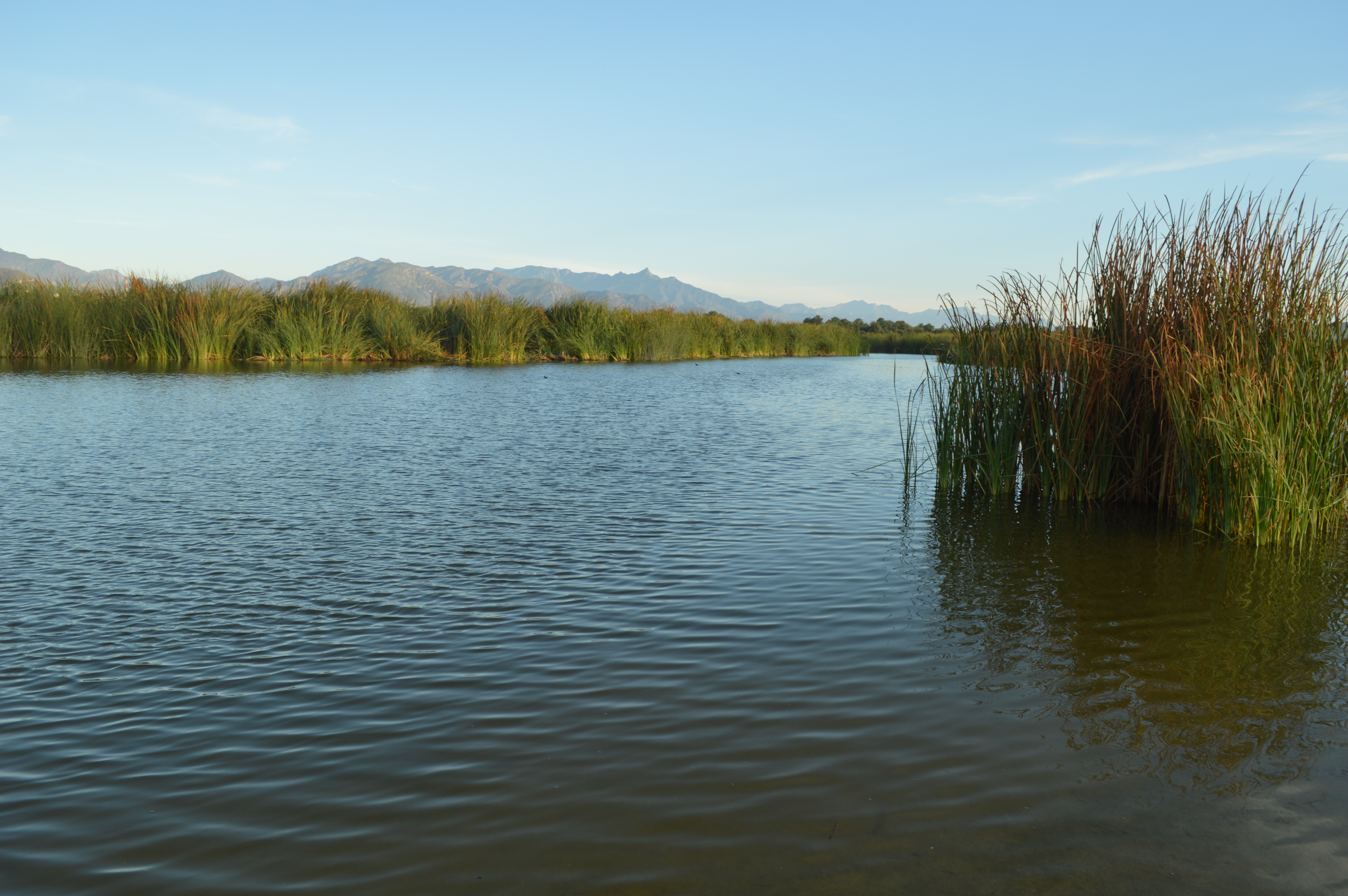
View of the San Jose Estuary

The state's most significant geological feature of the state is its 2,230 kilometres or 1,386 miles coastline, which constitutes 22% of Mexico's total coastline. It also includes the most islands of any state, with three in the Pacific: Natividad, Magdalena, and Santa Margarita, which is the largest. The islands in the Gulf of California include San Marcos, Coronados, Carmen, Montserrat, Santa Catalina, Santa Cruz, San Diego, San Jose, San Francisco, Partida, Espiritu Santo, and Cerralvo. The major bays include Sebastian Vizcaino, Magdalena, La Paz, Asunción, Ballenas, Concepcion and San Carlos. Estuaries and lagoons include those at Puerto Escondido, Nopoló, Balandra as well as the San José estuary at Cabo Colorado, the San Ignacio Lagoon, and the Ojo de Liebre.

Because of the relatively recent formation of the peninsula, its ecological system is considered to have evolved relatively recently, but it includes some endemic species. Vegetation at the lower elevations is dominated by arid-tolerant plants, including the world's largest species of cactus, the cardón cactus, which can reach a height of 15m. Other plant species include mesquite, chironola, lechuguilla, nopal and barrel cactus, choyas, paloadan, and pitahaya. The higher elevations have forests of pine and holm oak with some deciduous forests generally no taller than 15 metres or 49 feet in which leaves fall in the dry season. Wildlife in the desert areas is limited to birds, reptiles, and small-to-medium mammals such as rabbits and coyotes. Wild sheep, raccoons, deer, foxes, pumas and other wild cats can survive at upper elevations with more vegetation. Marine species include whales, seals, dolphins, gray whales, manta rays, and sea turtles.

Baja California Sur has the largest protected portion of any state in Mexico, 38.3% of the state in 10 officially protected areas: Bahía de Loreto National Park (510,472.2 acres), Cabo Pulmo National Park (17'570 acres), Espíritu Santo Archipelago National Park (120,228.70 acres), El Vizcaíno Biosphere Reserve (6,293,255.76 acres), Ojo de Liebre Lagoon Bioshere Reserve (196,026.15 acres), Sierra de la Laguna Biosphere Reserve (277,838.05 acres), Balandra Protection Area of Flora and Fauna (6,209.09 acres) and Cabo San Lucas Protection Area of Flora and Fauna (9,874.42 acres). Also, the islands located along the Baja California Sur coastline are protected either as part of the Pacific Islands of the Baja California Peninsula Biosphere Reserve or the Islands of the Gulf of California Protection Area of Flora and Fauna, which it shares with the states of Sinaloa and Sonora as well as the state of Baja California.

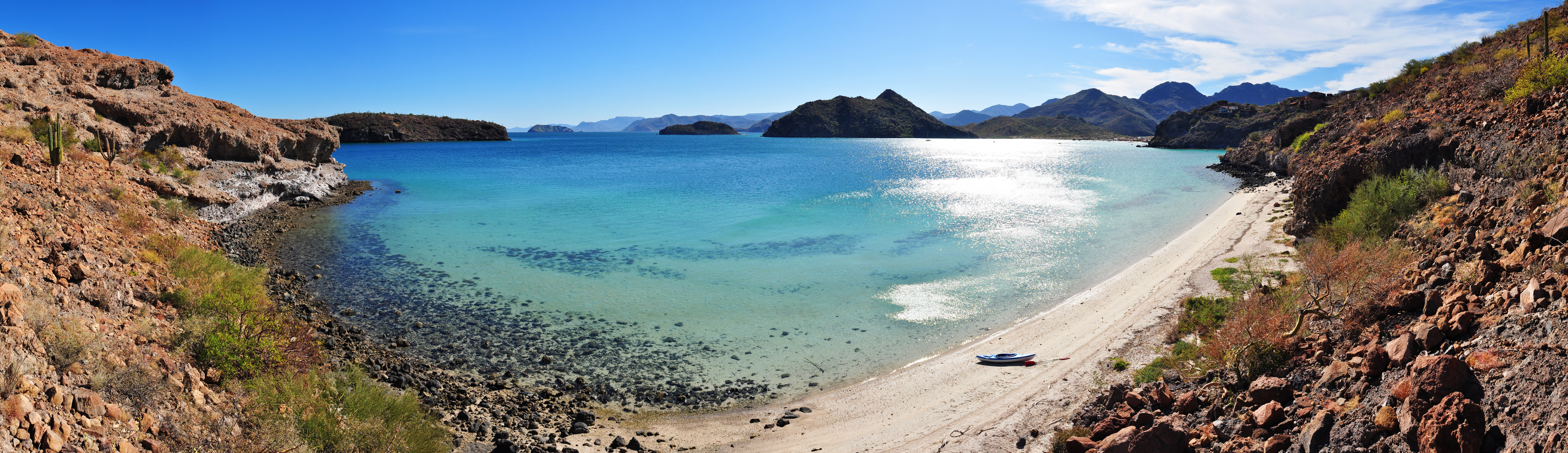
Playa Santispac on Bahía Concepción

== Demographics ==
Historical population
Year	Pop.	±%
1895	34,570	—
1900	40,041	+15.8%
1910	42,512	+6.2%
1921	39,294	−7.6%
1930	47,089	+19.8%
1940	51,471	+9.3%
1950	60,864	+18.2%
1960	81,594	+34.1%
1970	128,019	+56.9%
1980	215,139	+68.1%
1990	317,764	+47.7%
1995	375,494	+18.2%
2000	424,041	+12.9%
2005	512,170	+20.8%
2010	637,026	+24.4%
2015	763,929	+19.9%
2020	798,447	+4.5%

59% of the state population is mestizos, 40% whites, and 1% indigenous. As of 2010, 86% of the population lived in urban areas. According to the 2020 Census, 3.3% of Baja California Sur's population identified as Black, Afro-Mexican, or of African descent.

=== Largest cities ===
Largest cities or towns in Baja California Sur Source:
Rank		Municipality	Pop.
1	La Paz	La Paz	250,141
2	Cabo San Lucas	Los Cabos	202,694
3	San José del Cabo	Los Cabos	136,285
4	Ciudad Constitución	Comondú	43,805
5	Loreto	Loreto	16,311
6	Santa Rosalía	Mulegé	14,357
7	Guerrero Negro	Mulegé	13,596
8	Villa Alberto Andrés Alvarado Arámburo	Mulegé	10,897
9	Ciudad Insurgentes	Comondú	9,133
10	Todos Santos	La Paz	7,185

Those over age 15 have had 9.6 years of schooling on average, compared to the national average of 8.9. The state's illiteracy rate is 3%, compared to the national rate of 6.1%. Institutions of higher education include:

- Autonomous University of Baja California Sur (Universidad Autonoma de Baja California Sur, UABCS)
- Instituto Tecnologico de La Paz (ITLP)
- Centro de investigaciones biologicas del noroeste (CIBNOR)
- Centro Interdiciplinario de Ciencias Marinas (CICIMAR)
- Universidad Pedagógica Nacional (UPN)
- Universidad Internacional de la Paz (UNIPAZ)
- Instituto Tecnológico de Estudios Superiores de Los Cabos (ITES)
- Instituto Tecnológico Superior de Ciudad Constitución (ITSCC)
- Instituto Tecnológico Superior de Mulegé (ITESME)

Religion in Baja California Sur (2010 census)
Roman Catholicism	81.3%
Other Christian	9.8%
Other Religion	0.1%
No religion	6.3%
Unspecified	2.5%

== Government and politics ==
=== Political divisions ===
The state is divided into five municipalities. Comondú is located in the center of the state with its seat at Ciudad Constitución. It borders the municipalities of Mulegé, Loreto and La Paz with the Pacific Ocean to the west. Mulegé is in the north of the state with its capital in Santa Rosalía, with two other important population centers at Guerrero Negro and Mulegé. It borders the municipalities of Comondú and Loreto with Baja California to the north, the Pacific Ocean to the west and the Gulf of California to the east. It accounts for almost 45% of the state's territory. The municipality of La Paz is in the south of the state. It is the second largest municipality, accounting for just over 27% of the territory of the state. It borders the municipalities of Comondú and Los Cabos and extends from the Pacific Ocean to the Gulf of California. The municipality of Los Cabos is at the southern tip of the state, with its seat at San José del Cabo, and its most populous city is Cabo San Lucas. The municipality is one of the most important tourist destinations in Mexico. The municipality borders that of La Paz to the north, with the rest defined by the Pacific Ocean and the Gulf of California. The municipality of Loreto is in the center of the state, with the city of Loreto as its seat. It borders the municipalities of Mulegé and Comondú with the Gulf of California to the east.

=== Foreign relations ===
Baja California Sur is a member of the Commission of the Californias, a tri-lateral forum for cooperation between the U.S. state of California and the Mexican states of Baja California and Baja California Sur.

== Economy ==
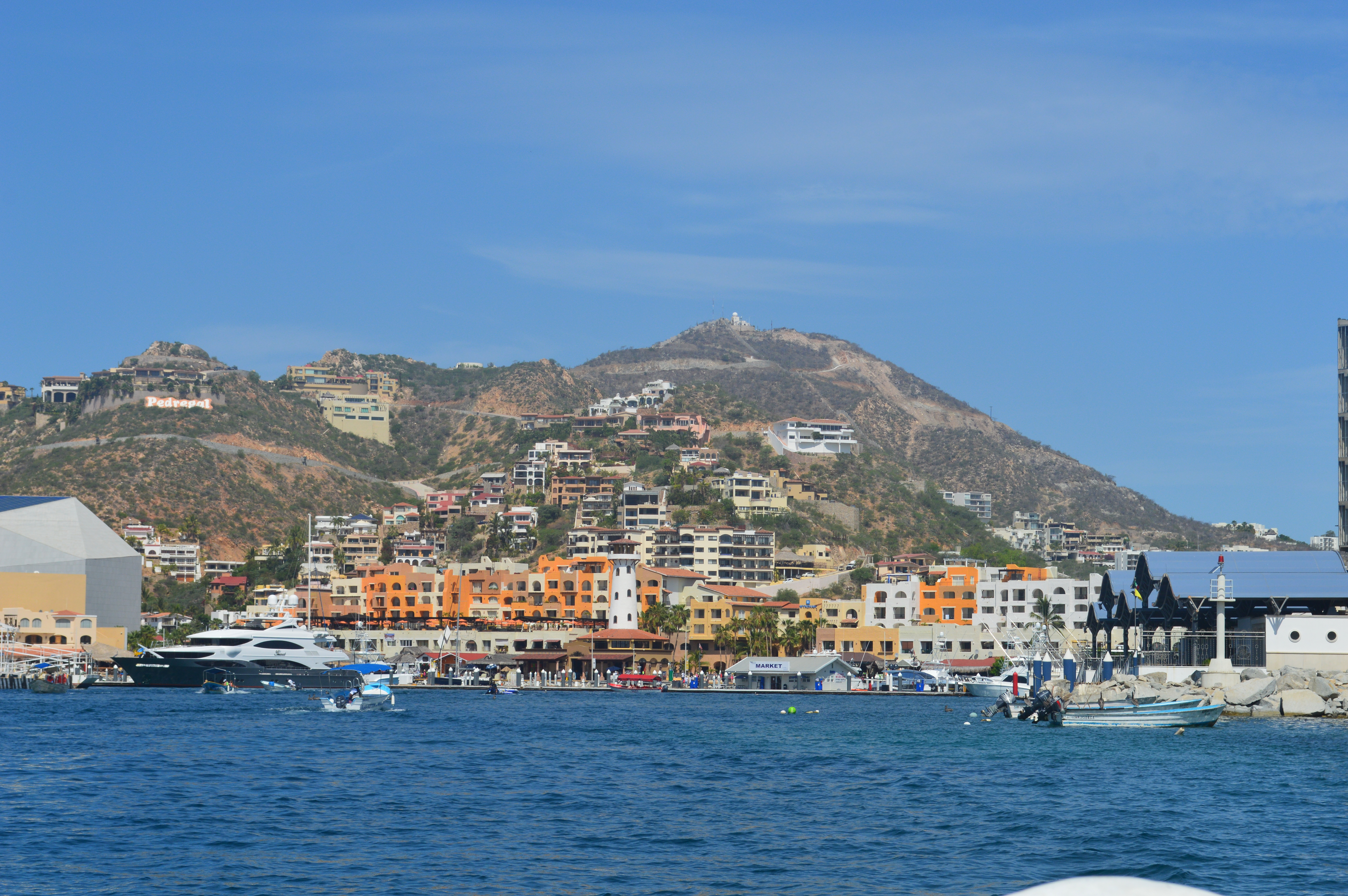
Port of Cabo San Lucas

The state's economy has been based mostly on tourism, sport fishing, salt production, and mining. In 2012 the state's GDP accounted for only 0.73% of the national GDP, but it had grown 3.13% since the prior year and increased 7.8% in 2013. Unemployment was 5.1% in 2013, when the economy showed a shift to mining and industry (up 19.9%) and commerce (up 4.9%) from agriculture, fishing and forestry, which accounted for only 3.89% of the state's GDP.

Commerce and services account for 69.5% of the GDP. La Paz was ranked 31st in Mexico by the World Bank and the International Finance Corporation in ease of doing business and 23rd as a place to open a business. Major activities of this type include hotel and food service (16.43%) and housing sales and rentals (10.67%), which along with other activities account for 58.37% of the total GDP.

The most dynamic aspect of the economy is tourism, drawn by natural attractions such as the grey whales that come to the area to breed and the much photographed natural rock arch at Land's End. Tourist attractions are divided into three regions: north (Guerrero Negro to Ciudad Constitución), center (La Paz to Todos Santos), and south (Los Barriles to Cabo San Lucas). The two main resort areas are Cabo San Lucas and San José del Cabo, both in the peninsula's southern tip and linked by a highway known as the Corridor. Other attractions include deep sea fishing, golf, tennis, motorcycling, scuba diving and snorkeling, with windsurfing at Medano Beach and surfing at Todos Santos, Pescadero East Cape and Scorpion Bay.

Mining, construction and utilities accounted for 26.61% of the state's GDP. Mining includes plaster (mainly on San Marcos Island), limestone (in Todos los Santos), phosphorus (in San Juan de La Costa and Adolfo LópezMateos, Comondú), copper (in Santa Rosalía), gold and silver (in the Triunfo-San Antonio mine), manganese (in Santa Rosalia and Punta Concepción Bay), and chrome (in San SebastiánVizcaíno and Magdalena bays). Minerals such as titanium, tungsten, and cobalt are not yet routinely mined. There is some possibility of offshore hydrocarbons. The state produces salt of 99.7% purity, mostly in the area around Guerrero Negro.

Other important activities include film production, information and communication technologies, and biotechnology. There are two major industrial/technology parks: Parque Tecnológico BioHelis and Parque Industrial La Paz Sur.

Commercial fishing harvests of lobster, shrimp, tuna, abalone, and clams are sold nationally and internationally. Other commercial marine species include sardines, anchovies, snails, oysters, shark, and crabs. Major agricultural products include garbanzo beans, sorghum, tomatoes, alfalfa, wheat, corn, green chili peppers, and livestock (pigs, cattle, goats and chickens). Fruits include dates, green papaya in syrup, along with guavas and pitahaya. Santa Rosalia is known for its production of breads.

Traditional handcrafts found throughout the state include articles made with seashells, palo chino, choya and cardon cactus, baskets and other items woven from palm fronds, especially in el Triunfo Los Planes and the Sierra de los Dolores, and fishing nets. Another important craft is leatherwork, especially gear for horseback riding such as saddles, holsters and chaps along with belts and carrying bags. Scrap metal is converted into various types of knives.

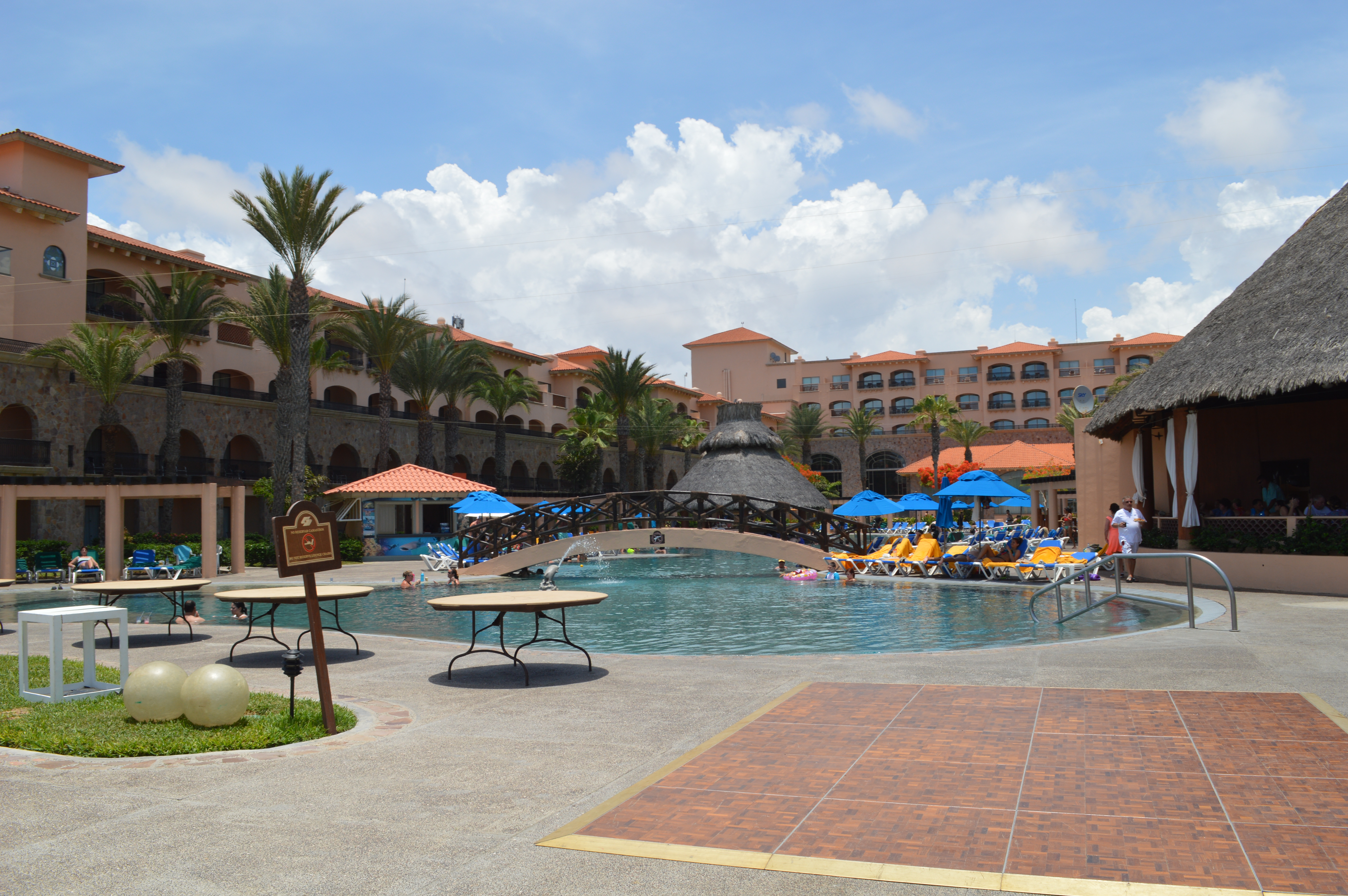
Royal Solaris resort in San Jose del Cabo

== Transportation ==
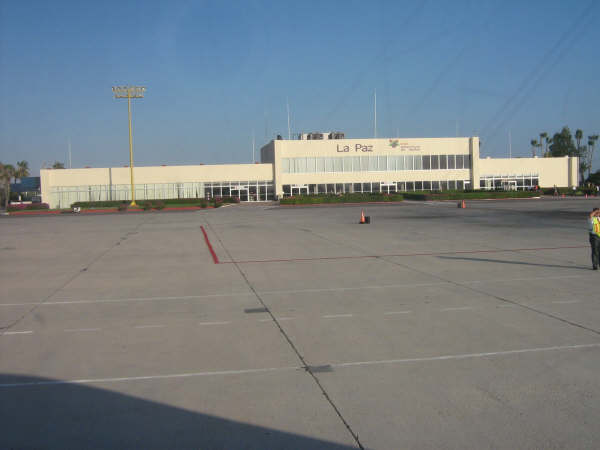
La Paz International Airport in south La Paz area

As of 2011, the state had 5,651 km of highway, eleven ports (five of which are international), and four international airports. The state's main airports are Los Cabos International Airport and Manuel Márquez de León International Airport.

The peninsula's main transport artery is Mexican Federal Highway 1, which runs from the south end of the peninsula at Cabo San Lucas to the United States-Mexico border at San Ysidro. Mexican Federal Highway 19 provides an alternate route between Cabo San Lucas and La Paz. A toll road, Mexican Federal Highway 1D, provides an alternate route from Los Cabos International Airport to Cabo San Lucas.

Transportation between the east coast of the peninsula to the mainland is available by ferry, with most going to Mazatlán in the state of Sinaloa, a trip that takes about 13 hours.

== Media ==
Newspapers of Baja California Sur include: El Peninsular, El Periódico, El Sudcaliforniano , and Tribuna de los Cabos.

== Culture ==
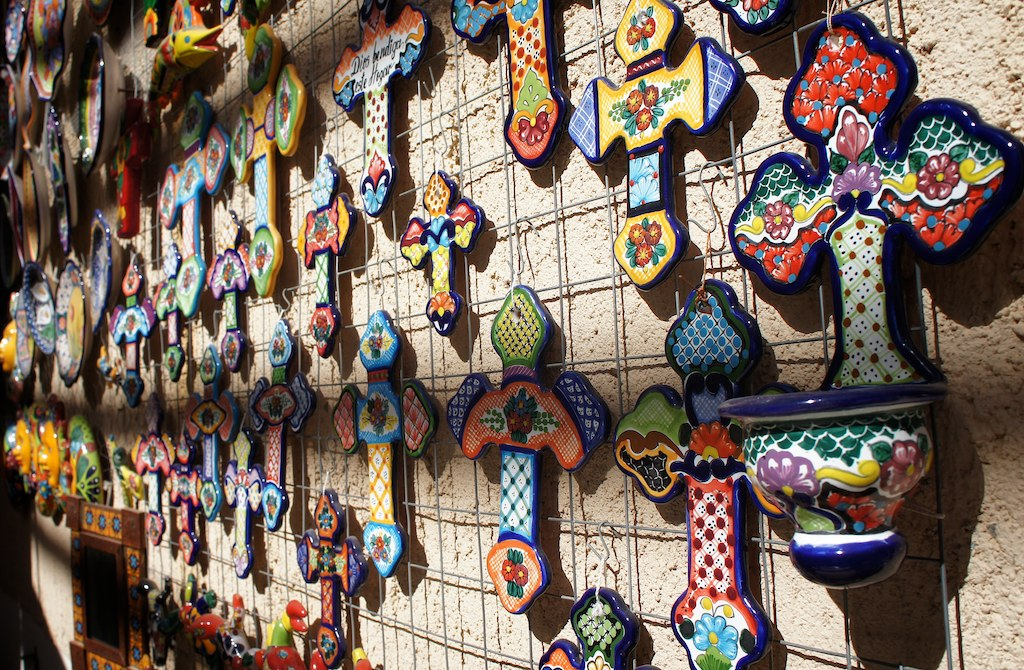
Local religious pottery, Todos Santos

Three of the indigenous cultures remain, the Cochimí, the Guaycura and the Pericú. Traditional music is usually played by trios playing an accordion and two guitars in bands called "cochi", in styles such as corridos, waltzes, polkas and mazurkas along with norteño. Traditional dress for women includes a semicircular red skirt decorated with local flora, along with a flowered blouse. This is most often seen at festivals where traditional dances such as Las Pitahayas, El Conejo, El Apasionado, El Chaverán, La Yuca, La Cuera, Las Calabazas and El Tupé are performed.

Because of the long coastline, much of the cuisine is based on seafood, including species such as manta rays that are seldom eaten in other parts of Mexico. Oregano and local herb damiana are common seasonings. The latter is also used as a flavoring for a local liquor. Traditional dishes such as machaca and breaded and fried clams are generally accompanied by flour tortillas.

== Coat of arms ==
The coat of arms emphasizes the state's connection to the sea, including images of silver fish, a silver shell, and a blue background. This design, topped with crown, was the coat of arms for the former Province of Las Californias, which included Baja California Sur, Baja California, the U.S. state of California, and part of Arizona state.

== Notable people ==
- Julián Abitia, governor Baja California Sur and then Quintana Roo

== See also ==
- El Boleo
