= California (disambiguation) =

California is the most populous state in the United States.

California may also refer to:

== Arts and entertainment ==
=== Film and television ===
- California (1927 film), an American Western silent film by W.S. Van Dyke
- California (1947 film), an American Western by John Farrow
- California (1963 film), an American Western by Hamil Petroff
- California (1977 film), an Italo-Spanish Spaghetti Western by Michele Lupo
- California Carlson, a sidekick of Hopalong Cassidy
- Robert California, a character on the American TV sitcom The Office
- California-class starship from Star Trek Lower Decks

=== Music ===
==== Bands ====
- California, a 1973–1985 pop rock band featuring Les Fradkin

==== Albums ====
- California (American Music Club album), 1988
- California (Blink-182 album) or the title song, 2016
- California (The Electric Prunes album), 2004
- California (Gianna Nannini album) or the title song, 1979
- California (Mr. Bungle album), 1999
- California (Wilson Phillips album), 2004
- California (Datarock EP) or the title song, 2011
- California (Diplo EP), 2018
- California, by Riverdogs, 1990

==== Songs ====
- "California" (Amelia Lily song), 2014
- "California" (Belinda Carlisle song), 1997
- "California" (Big & Rich song), 2017
- "California" (Delta Spirit song), 2012
- "California" (Joni Mitchell song), 1971
- "California" (Lenny Kravitz song), 2004
- "California" (Mylène Farmer song), 1995
- "California" (Phantom Planet song), 2002
- "California" (Usher song), 2020
- "California" (Wave song), 2001
- "California", by Beabadoobee from This Is How Tomorrow Moves, 2024
- "California", by Bob Dylan from NCIS: The Official TV Soundtrack - Vol. 2, 2009
- "California", by Chappell Roan from The Rise and Fall of a Midwest Princess, 2023
- "California", by Childish Gambino from "Awaken, My Love!", 2016
- "California", by Chuck Berry from Rockit, 1979
- "California", by CHVRCHES from Screen Violence, 2021
- "California", by Debby Boone from Midstream, 1978
- "California", by Eddie Meduza from West a Fool Away, 1984
- "California", by Grimes from Art Angels, 2015
- "California", by Hollywood Undead from Swan Songs, 2008
- "California", by James Blunt from The Afterlove, 2017
- "California", by Jessie J from Don't Tease Me with a Good Time, 2025
- "California", by John Mayall from The Turning Point, 1969
- "California", by Keith Stegall, 1985
- "California", by Lana Del Rey from Norman Fucking Rockwell!, 2019
- "California", by Loudermilk from The Red Record, 2002
- "California", by Lorde from Solar Power, 2021
- "California", by Low from The Great Destroyer, 2005
- "California", by Manafest from Stories Since Seventy Nine, 2012
- "California", by Maroon 5 from Love Is Like, 2025
- "California", by Mazzy Star from Seasons of Your Day, 2013
- "California", by Metro Station from Metro Station, 2007
- "California", by Never Shout Never from What Is Love?, 2010
- "California", by Oliver Tree from Cowboy Tears, 2022
- "California", by Rich Brian, Niki, and Warren Hue, 2021
- "California", by Rufus Wainwright from Poses, 2001
- "California", by Semisonic from Feeling Strangely Fine, 1998
- "California", by Silverstein from This Is How the Wind Shifts, 2013
- "California", by Stan Rogers from Northwest Passage, 1981
- "California", by The Band Camino, 2017
- "California", by The Growlers, 2017
- "California", by Tim McGraw from Damn Country Music, 2015
- "California", by Tom Petty and the Heartbreakers from Songs and Music from "She's the One", 1996
- "California", by twlv, 2020
- "California", by Volumes from Mirror Touch, 2025
- "California", by Wax from 13 Unlucky Numbers, 1995
- "California", by the Wedding Present from Hit Parade 1, 1992
- "California", by Wild Strawberries from Bet You Think I'm Lonely, 1994
- "California", by Winds of Plague from Against the World, 2011
- "California", by Withered Hand from New Gods, 2014
- "California (The Way I Say I Love You)", by Good Charlotte from Generation Rx, 2018
- "California (There Is No End to Love)", by U2 from Songs of Innocence, 2014

=== Other arts and entertainment ===
- California, a fictitious island in the novel Las sergas de Esplandián
- California (novel), by Edan Lepucki
- California (sculpture), a marble sculpture by Hiram Powers
- California magazine, a magazine published by the Cal Alumni Association

== Education ==
- University of California, a public university system
  - California Golden Bears, the athletic programs of the University of California, Berkeley
- California University of Science and Medicine, Colton, California
- California University of Pennsylvania, a former name of the University of Western Pennsylvania in California, Pennsylvania
  - California Vulcans, the athletic programs of the University of Western Pennsylvania in California
- California High School (San Ramon, California)
- California High School (Whittier, California)
- California Elementary School, Orange Unified School District, Orange, California

== Naval vessels ==
- USS California, a list of U.S. Navy ships
- California-class cruiser, a class of two U.S. Navy guided missile cruisers
- ARM California, a list of Mexican Navy ships

== People ==
- California Molefe (born 1980), Botswanan runner
- California Odha Zertuche Díaz (1923–1991), Mexican civil engineer
- Randy California, stage name of American musician Randy Craig Wolfe (1951–1997)

== Places ==
=== Regions and historical territories ===
- California Republic, a short-lived state declared during the Mexican–American War
- The Californias, or Las Californias, a region along the west coast of North America during Spanish and Mexican rule
- Province of Las Californias, a province of New Spain, encompassing the region and further areas
- California Department, a department of the Second Mexican Empire (1863−1865)
- Roman Catholic Diocese of California, formerly a residential episcopal see and currently a titular see of the Catholic Church
- Island of California, an early geographical misconception that the Baja California Peninsula was an island

=== Municipalities and neighborhoods ===
==== United Kingdom ====
===== England =====
- California, Bedfordshire, a hamlet
- California, Berkshire, a village
- California, Buckinghamshire, a hamlet
- California, Derby, an inner-city area of Derby, Derbyshire
- California, Ipswich, Suffolk
- California, Norfolk, a seaside resort
- California, Birmingham, a suburban area of Birmingham, West Midlands

===== Scotland =====
- California, Falkirk, a village

==== United States ====
- California Township, Madison County, Arkansas
- California City, California
- California Township, Starke County, Indiana
- California, Kentucky, a city in Campbell County, Kentucky
- California, Louisville, a neighborhood in Louisville, Kentucky
- California, Maine, an unincorporated community
- California, Maryland, a census-designated place and community
- California Township, Michigan
- California, Missouri, a city
- Califon, New Jersey, originally named California, a borough
- California, Cincinnati, a neighborhood within Cincinnati, Ohio
- Big Plain, Ohio, originally named California
- California, Pennsylvania, a borough
- California, West Virginia, a ghost town

==== Other municipalities and neighborhoods ====
- Califórnia, Paraná, Brazil
- California, Ontario, Canada
- California, Santander, Colombia
- California, Usulután, El Salvador
- La California, Tuscany, Italy
- California, Ubay, Bohol, Philippines
- California, Trinidad and Tobago

=== Outer space ===
- California Nebula
- 341 California, an asteroid

=== Other places ===
- Gulf of California, a body of water between the Baja California peninsula and the Mexican mainland

== Transportation ==
=== Land vehicles ===
- Ferrari California, a convertible
- Moto Guzzi California, a motorcycle
- Volkswagen California, a passenger van
- Chevrolet Corvette 305 "California", the version of the 1980 Chevrolet Corvette sold in California
- Ferrari 250 GT California Spyder, aka Ferrari 250 California, a roadster
- Ferrari 365 California, a convertible model of the Ferrari America series

=== Ships ===
- SS California, a list of ships
- California, a small sailing ship used during the Northwest Passage expedition of 1746

=== Chicago Transit Authority stations ===
- California station (CTA Blue Line)
- California station (CTA Congress Line), an abandoned station on the Congress Line (now part of the Blue Line)
- California station (CTA Green Line)
- California station (CTA Pink Line)

=== Other stations ===
- La California station, a station of Caracas metro

== Other uses ==
- Hotel California (disambiguation)
- California macrophylla, a plant species in the family Geraniaceae
- Pizza California, a Japanese pizza restaurant chain

== See also ==
- 1 California (disambiguation)
- Alta California (disambiguation)
- Baja California (disambiguation)
- California Star (disambiguation)
- Californian (disambiguation)
- Californië (disambiguation)
- Californios, Hispanic Californians, especially those descended from Spanish and Mexican settlers of the 17th through 19th centuries
- Californium
- Kalifornia (disambiguation)
