= Baha' al-Din =

Baha al-Din or Bahaa ad-Din (Arabic: بهاء الدين, romanized: Bahāʾ al-Dīn, lit. 'splendour of the faith'), or various variants like Bahauddin, Baha eddine or (in Turkish) Bahattin, may refer to:

== Surname ==
- A. K. M. Bahauddin (born 1954), Bangladeshi politician and the Member of Parliament from Comilla
- Salaheddine Bahaaeddin (born 1950), Kurdish Iraqi politician

== Middle name ==
- AFM Bahauddin Nasim (born 1961), Bangladeshi politician and former Member of Parliament from Madaripur

== Given name ==
- Bahaedin Adab (1945–2007), Iranian Kurdish politician and engineer
- Bahauddin Baha (born 1941), contemporary Afghan judge
- Bahauddin Dagar (born 1970), Indian musician
- Mufti Baha-ud-din Farooqi (1927–2014), contemporary Indian judge
- Bahaddin Gaziyev (born 1965), Azerbaijani journalist
- Rafic Hariri, full name: Rafic Baha El Deen Al-Hariri (1944–2005), Lebanese businessman and politician
- Qawwal Bahauddin Khan (1934–2006), Pakistani musician
- Bahattin Köse (born 1990), Turkish-German footballer
- Behaeddin Shakir, aka Bahattin Şakir (1874–1922), Turkish political activist
- Bahattin Sofuoğlu (1978–2002), Turkish motor cycle racer
- Bahattin Sofuoğlu (2003) (born 2003), Turkish motor cycle racer

== Religious honorific name (laqab) ==
- Baha al-Din al-Muqtana (died c. 1042), founder of the Druze Faith
- Baha al-Din Qaraqush (died 1201), military commander under Saladin
- Baha ad-Din ibn Shaddad (1145–1234), jurist and scholar, biographer of Saladin
- Baha-ud-din Zakariya (c. 1170 – 1268), Sufi teacher
- Baha' al-din Zuhair (1186–1258), Arabian poet
- Baha-ud-Din Naqshband Bukhari (1318–1389), founder of Sufi Muslim order, the Naqshbandi
- Baha' ad-Din al-`Amili (1547–1621), Persian and Lebanese scholar and poet
- Rahmizâde Bâhâeddin Bediz (Rahmi Bediz since 1934; 1875–1951), Turkish photographer

== Places ==
- Mandi Bahauddin, town and district in Pakistan

== See also ==
- Baha (name)
