= 1 California =

1 California, California One, 1st California, California First, or variant thereof, may refer to:

- 1 California (bus line), a trolleybus line in San Francisco
- One California, San Francisco office building
- One California Plaza, Los Angeles office building
- OneCalifornia Bank, bank
- OneCalifornia, political opposition group to Six Californias

California 1 may refer to:

- California State Route 1

1st California may refer to:

- First California Mortgage
- California Battalion
- 1st California Infantry
- 1st Regiment California Volunteer Cavalry
- 1st California Veteran Infantry Battalion
- 1st Battalion of Native Cavalry, California Volunteers

California 1st may refer to:

- California's 1st district (disambiguation)
- California's 1st congressional district
- California's 1st State Assembly district
- California's 1st State Senate district

== See also ==
- California (disambiguation)
