= BAHA =

BAHA may refer to:

- Bone anchored hearing aid
- Cochlear Baha
- Berkeley Architectural Heritage Association
- Havelsan BAHA, a Turkish UAV
- Relating to the Baháʼí Faith
- A misspelling of Baja

== See also ==
- Baha (disambiguation)
- Cochlear Baha
