= Christopher Hart =

Chris or Christopher Hart may refer to:

== Public officials ==
- Christopher A. Hart, American National Transportation Safety Board chairman (2014–2017)
- Chris Hart IV (born 1968), American legislator in Florida House of Representatives
- Chris R. Hart (born 1972), American legislator in South Carolina House of Representatives

== Others ==
- Christopher Hart (actor) (born 1961), Canadian actor and magician
- Christopher Hart (novelist) (born 1965), English journalist
- Christopher K. Hart, American banking executive in California since 2002
- Chris Hart (musician) (born 1984), American-born Japanese singer/songwriter/producer
- Chris Hart (Canadian football) (born 1988), American player of Canadian football

== Characters ==
- Chris Hart, regular from 1997 to 1999 on British soap opera (List of Family Affairs characters)

== See also ==
- Chris Harte, American newspaper publisher since 1980s
- Christopher Harte (born 1949), Irish cricketer
