= Baha =

Baha (also transliterated as Bahaa, Arabic: بهاء) may refer to:

== People ==
- Baha (name)

== Places ==
- Al Bahah, a city in Saudi Arabia

== Trademark ==
- Cochlear Baha, a hearing aid manufactured by Cochlear

== Title ==
- Al-Muqtana Baha'uddin (979–1043), Druze religious leader
- Baháʼ, in the Baháʼí Faith

== See also ==
- Baha is considered to be the Ultimate name of God in the Baháʼí Faith
- BAHA (disambiguation)
- Baja (disambiguation)
