= Heroes for Sale =

Heroes for Sale may refer to:

- Heroes for Sale (film), a 1933 film directed by William Wellman
- Heroes for Sale (Andy Mineo album), 2013
- Heroes for Sale (Nasty Idols album), 2002
- Heroes for Sale, a 1982 novel by Hans Hellmut Kirst
