= Californian (ship) =

Californian (ship) may refer to the following ships:

- SS Californian (1865), a passenger-cargo steamer of the West India & Pacific Steam Ship Company; wrecked in 1891
- SS Californian (1891), a passenger liner of Allan Line, built as State of California
- USS Californian (1900), a cargo ship built for the American-Hawaiian Steamship Company in 1900; taken up for service with the United States Navy during World War I and sunk by a naval mine in June 1918
- SS Californian (1901), a cargo-passenger ship of the Leyland Line, notable for inaction while near the sinking RMS Titanic in April 1912; the ship was sunk on 9 November 1915, during World War I, by the German submarine U-35
- MV Californian (1921), an American cargo ship built for the American-Hawaiian Steamship Company; sold to the British Ministry of War Transport in 1940 and torpedoed and sunk in 1942 by the German submarine U-96
- SS Californian (1943), the name of the T2 tanker SS Sackett's Harbor between 1970 and 1975
- TSS Californian (1946), a cargo ship of the American-Hawaiian Steamship Company, built as the Type C4 ship Mount Greylock for the United States Maritime Commission
- Californian (schooner) (1984), the "Official Tall Ship Ambassador for the State of California"

== See also ==
- Californian (disambiguation)
- SS California
- USS California
