= Schools in California =

Schools in California may refer to the following:

- List of high schools in California
- List of school districts in California
- Education in California

== See also ==
- Category:Schools in California
- California School (disambiguation)
- California (disambiguation)
