= Boy's Town (album) =

Boys Town

Studio album by Nasty Idols
- Released: 27 March 2009
- Recorded: 2008, at CMS Studios, Malmö, Sweden
- Genre: Sleaze rock, hard rock
- Length: 46:50
- Label: Metal Heaven
- Producer: Matti Engdahl/Andy Pierce

Nasty Idols chronology
Heroes for Sale (2002)	Boys Town (2009)	Kalifornia (2012)

Boys Town is Nasty Idols fifth album release after 2002's Heroes for Sale. It is largely seen as a return to the sound that made them well known in Sweden with their albums Cruel Intention and Vicious. It is the band's first album with drummer Rikki Dahl, who replaced Stanley in the band's recent tours.

== Track listing ==
No.	Title	Length
1.	"Rock Out"	2:37
2.	"Boys Town"	4:47
3.	"Method to My Madness"	3:16
4.	"Scar for Life"	4:32
5.	"Nite Like This"	4:39
6.	"Crashlanding"	3:48
7.	"48 Hours"	3:37
8.	"7 Year Itch"	4:03
9.	"Evil One"	3:05
10.	"It's Not Love"	3:32
11.	"Need the Nite"	2:53
12.	"It Ain't Easy"	6:02

== Personnel ==
- Andy Pierce - vocals, acoustic guitar
- Peter Espinoza - lead guitar
- Dick Qwarfort - bass
- Rikki Dahl - drums
- Matti Engdahl - keyboards and strings on "Nite Like This" and "It Ain't Easy"

Production

- Andy Pierce - producer
- Matti Engdahl - producer, engineer, mastering
