= California High =

California High may refer to:

- California High School (disambiguation), multiple schools with the name
- California High, a fainting game
