= The Californians =

The Californians may refer to:

- The Californians (TV series), American NBC 1950s western
- "The Californians" (Dynasty), episode of TV show, Dynasty
- "The Californians" (Saturday Night Live), soap opera parody of lifestyles and accents that first aired in 2012
- The Californians (film), 2005 American independent drama adapted from Henry James' novel The Bostonians

== See also ==
- The Californian (disambiguation), including several periodicals
- The Californias
- Californian (disambiguation)
- California (disambiguation)
