= Baha (name) =

Baha is a name which is used as a given name and a surname. People with the name include:

== Given name ==
- Baha' Abdel-Rahman (born 1987), Jordanian football player
- Baha Abu al-Ata (1977–2019), leader of Islamic Jihad Movement in Palestine
- Baha Akşit (1914–1995), Turkish physician and politician
- Baha Araji (born 1967), Iraqi politician
- Baha al-Dawla (died 1012), amir of Iraq
- Baha Al-Dowleh Razi (died 915), Iranian physician
- Baha' Faisal (born 1995), Jordanian football player
- Baha Gelenbevi (1907–1984), Turkish film director
- Bahaa Hariri (born 1966), Lebanese businessman
- Baha Mousa (died 2003), Iraqi hotel receptionist killed whilst in British Army custody
- Bahaa Taher (born 1935), Egyptian novelist
- Baha Toukan (1910–1971), Jordanian diplomat
- Bahaa Trabelsi (born 1966), Moroccan novelist

=== Middle name ===
- A. Baha Balantekin, Turkish physicist
- Phaustin Baha Sulle (born 1982), Tanzanian long-distance runner

== Surname ==
- Alyaksey Baha (born 1981), Belarusian football player
- Bahauddin Baha (born 1941), Afghan judge
- Dzmitry Baha (born 1990), Belarusian football player
- Huriye Baha Öniz (1887–1950), Turkish educator and politician
- Nabil Baha (born 1981), Moroccan football player
- Regis Baha (born 1996), Cameroonian football player

== See also ==
- Baha' al-Din (disambiguation), list of people with the related name
