= Hotel (disambiguation) =

A hotel is an establishment that provides paid lodging on a short-term basis.

Hotel may also refer to:

== Arts, entertainment, and media ==
=== Films ===
- Hotel (1967 film), based on the Hailey novel and starring Rod Taylor
- Hotel (2001 film), by Mike Figgis
- Hotel (2004 film), by Jessica Hausner
- Hotel!, a 2001 TV spoof comedy movie starring Paul McGann
- Hotell, a 2013 Swedish film
- Hotel (1981 film), a Bollywood film

=== Games ===
- Hotel (board game), a 1987 board game manufactured by Milton Bradley
- Hotel Dusk: Room 215, a 2007 Nintendo DS game by Nintendo
- Hotel Mario, a famous 1994 game from Phillips and is used as an Internet meme

=== Literature ===
- Hotel (Hailey novel), a 1965 novel by Arthur Hailey
- Hotel (Walsh book), a 2015 book by Joanna Walsh
- Hotel, a 2014 play by Polly Stenham
- Hotels (magazine), published by Reed Business Information
- The Hotel (novel), a 1927 novel by Elizabeth Bowen

=== Music ===
- Hotel (band), an American rock band

==== Albums ====
- Hotel (album), by Moby, 2005
- Hotels, an EP by Windsor Airlift, 2005

==== Songs ====
- "Hotel" (Cassidy song), 2004
- "Hotel" (Kid Ink song), 2015
- "Hotel" (Kita Alexander song), 2017
- "Hotel", by Lawsy, 2022
- "Hotel" (Koda Kumi song), 2014
- "Hotel", by The Antlers from Familiars, 2014
- "Hotel", by City Sleeps from Not an Angel, 2007
- "Hotel", by Toby Fox, a track from the soundtrack of the 2015 video game Undertale
- "Hotel", by Tori Amos from From the Choirgirl Hotel, 1998
- "Hotels", by Juliana Hatfield from Beautiful Creature, 2000
- "Hotels", by Medina from Forever, 2012
- "Hotels", by Moka Only from the album Clap Trap, 2008

=== Television ===
- Hotel (American TV series), also based on the Hailey novel, a television series aired in the United States from 1983 until 1988
- Hotel (British TV series), a 1997 British television documentary programme about the Britannia Adelphi Hotel that aired on BBC
- Hotel (Hong Kong TV series), a 1976 Hong Kong television series
- American Horror Story: Hotel (2015), the fifth installment of the anthology show, set in the fictional Hotel Cortez of Los Angeles
- The Hotel (Singaporean TV series), a Singapore Chinese-language drama
- The Hotel (British TV series), a 2011 British documentary television programme broadcast on Channel 4
- "Hotel" (Bluey), an episode of the first season of the animated TV series Bluey

== Other uses ==
- Hotel, pronunciation of the letter "H" in the NATO phonetic alphabet
- Australian pub, sometimes known as a hotel, which may or may not provide paid lodging on a short-term basis
- Hotel class, a type of Soviet nuclear submarine
- Hôtel de Ville, a French city hall
- Hôtel particulier, a grand French townhouse

== See also ==
- Grand Hotel (disambiguation)
- Hotel California (disambiguation)
- Hotelier (disambiguation)
- Hotels.com
