= Roadsurfer =

German camper van and RV rental company

Roadsurfer GmbH
- Type: GmbH
- Industry: Camper van and RV rental
- Founded: 2016 in Munich, Germany
- Founders: Markus Dickhardt; Susanne Dickhardt; Christoph Niemann; Stephie Niemann; Jean-Marie Klein
- Headquarters: Munich, Germany
- Key people: Markus Dickhardt (managing director); Susanne Dickhardt (managing director); Christoph Benedikt Niemann (managing director)
- Services: Camper van and RV rental, vehicle subscriptions, used-vehicle sales and campsite booking
- Revenue: €138.9 million (2024)
- Number of employees: 900 (2024)
- Website: roadsurfer.com

Roadsurfer GmbH is a camper van and recreational vehicle (RV) rental company based in Munich, Germany. Founded in 2016, it operates rental locations in Europe, the United States and Canada. In 2025, the company had a fleet of around 10,000 vehicles and 90 locations in 16 countries.

Alongside short-term rentals, Roadsurfer offers longer-term vehicle subscriptions and sells used camper vans and RVs from its rental fleet. It also runs Roadsurfer Spots, a campsite booking platform.

== History ==
Camper Van Liberty Lodge

Roadsurfer was founded by Markus and Susanne Dickhardt, Christoph and Stephie Niemann, and Jean-Marie Klein. The idea came about on a joint camping trip, after the founders had struggled to find a camper van available for short-term rental.

The first rental locations were in Munich, Frankfurt and Hamburg. Roadsurfer started out with around 25 vehicles, mostly Volkswagen models such as the Volkswagen T6 California. In its early years, the company doubled the size of its fleet every year.

In 2020, during the COVID-19 pandemic, Roadsurfer launched a camper van subscription that allowed customers to use a vehicle for several months at a time.

The company went on to open locations in other European countries, including Austria, Italy, Belgium and the Netherlands, followed by the United Kingdom in 2022. By 2021, its fleet had grown to around 2,500 vehicles. That year, Roadsurfer raised €24 million in a Series B funding round involving the venture capital firms HV Capital and Heartcore Capital. A further €4.5 million later in 2021 brought the round to €28.5 million.

Roadsurfer entered the United States in 2022, opening its first location outside Europe in Los Angeles that June. The location opened with around 50 vehicles, and the company doubled its Los Angeles fleet within its first year in the US market.

Also in 2022, the company secured €40 million in fleet financing from NordLB. The facility was increased to €80 million in 2024, with UniCredit Bank joining the financing.

In 2024, Roadsurfer added locations in San Francisco and Las Vegas, opened its first Canadian locations in Vancouver and Calgary, and introduced one-way rentals in North America. Further locations followed in Denver, Phoenix, Salt Lake City and Seattle in spring 2025. The company's North American fleet grew from around 250 vehicles in 2024 to around 800 in 2025.

In 2025, Roadsurfer secured a further €85 million in financing. The package combined €60 million in asset-backed securities financing from Macquarie Group with €25 million in venture debt from BBVA.

In October 2025, the company opened its first East Coast location in Miami. A location near Dallas Fort Worth International Airport followed in March 2026.

== Company structure ==
Roadsurfer GmbH is headquartered in Munich and led by its managing directors Markus Dickhardt, Susanne Dickhardt and Christoph Benedikt Niemann. The group has subsidiaries in Europe and North America.

For the 2024 fiscal year, the company reported revenue of €138.9 million and an average of 900 employees.

| Year | Revenue (€ million) | Revenue (US$ million, approx.) | Average employees |
|---|---|---|---|
| 2024 | 138.9 | 150 | 900 |
| 2023 | 114.2 | 124 | 601 |
| 2022 | 78.5 | 83 | 569 |

== Services and fleet ==
Recreational Vehicle Family Freedom

Roadsurfer rents camper vans and RVs for leisure travel. Vehicles are picked up and dropped off at rental locations in Europe and North America. The company also offers multi-month subscriptions and sells used camper vans and RVs from its own fleet.

Since 2021, the company has run the Roadsurfer Spots booking platform, through which private landowners and campground owners can rent out campsites to travelers, with Roadsurfer taking a commission on each booking. As of 2023, the platform was available only in Europe.

The vehicles come with seating and sleeping space as well as basic camping gear. Depending on the model, they may also include a kitchenette, refrigerator, water tank, outdoor shower or bathroom.

The lineup varies by market. In Europe, the fleet consists mainly of compact camper vans such as the Volkswagen California, with larger Sprinter-style vans and Class C motorhomes available in some markets. In the United States and Canada, Roadsurfer rents Class B camper vans and Class C RVs that sleep two to five people, marketed under the model names Liberty Lodge, Couple Condo, Family Freedom and Horizon Hopper. At its US launch, the fleet consisted of Winnebago Solis and Travato vans and Thor Motor Coach Tellaro and Sequence models. Later additions included the Thor Four Winds 22E (Family Freedom) and the Winnebago Revel 44E (Horizon Hopper). Roadsurfer's North American locations are situated near major airports and serve both local customers and visitors from Europe. The company also offers one-way rentals in the United States and Canada, allowing customers to drop off a vehicle at a different Roadsurfer location.
