= Rejects on the Road =

Video by Nasty Idols
- Released: 2007
- Genre: Sleaze rock, hard rock
- Label: Swedmetal Records
- Producer: Matti Engdahl and Nasty Idols

Nasty Idols chronology
Rejects on the Road (2007)	Boy's Town (2009)

Rejects on the Road is a Nasty Idols Live DVD release and currently the only to be released.

== DVD Track listing ==
No.	Title	Length
1.	"Heads Down (In tinseltown)"
2.	"The Way Ya' Walk"
3.	"Alive N' Kickin'"
4.	"Dance of the wicked"
5.	"Westcoast city rockers"
6.	"B.I.T.C.H"
7.	"Can't Get Ya' Off My Mind"
8.	"Killin' Stuff"
9.	"Sheila"
10.	"Cool Way Of Living"
11.	"House of Rock N' Roll"

=== Bonus Material ===
No.	Title	Length
1.	""The Return of the Idols" Documentary"
2.	""The Way Ya' Walk" Music Video"
3.	"Biography"
4.	"Discography"

== Personnel ==
- Andy Pierce - Vocals and acoustic guitar
- Peter Espinoza - Lead Guitar and synthesizers
- Dick Qwarfort - Bass
- Rikki Dahl - Drums
