= Kalifornia (disambiguation) =

Kalifornia is a 1993 film directed by Dominic Sena and starring Brad Pitt, Juliette Lewis, David Duchovny, and Michelle Forbes. Kalifornia may also refer to:

- "Kalifornia", a track from the Biker Boyz soundtrack
- "Kalifornia", a single from Above the Law's 1994 album Uncle Sam's Curse
- "Kalifornia", a track from Fatboy Slim's 1998 album You've Come a Long Way, Baby
- "Kalifornia", a single from Kashmir's 2005 album No Balance Palace
- "Kalifornia", a track from The Subways' 2008 album All or Nothing
- Kalifornia, a 1999 album by Ultra Bra
- Kalifornia (album), a 2012 album by Nasty Idols

== See also ==
- California (disambiguation)
