= Gigolos on Parole =

Studio album by Nasty Idols
- Released: 1989
- Genre: Glam metal
- Label: HSM Records/CBS Records
- Producer: Berno Paulsson / Nasty Idols

Nasty Idols chronology
Gigolos on Parole (1989)	Cruel Intention (1991)

Singles from Gigolos on Parole
- 1. "Don't Walk From Love/Easy Come Easy Go" Released: 1988

Gigolos on Parole is Nasty Idols' debut album release. This is the only release that the band openly discredits as they don't feel it represents the band at all. It is seen as a fan only release; one for collectors.

== Track listing ==
No.	Title	Length
1.	"Intro"	0:54
2.	"Gimme What I Want"	5:00
3.	"Can't Get Enough"	4:21
4.	"No More Mr. Nice Guy"	3:29
5.	"She's on Fire"	4:46
6.	"Interlude"	0:26
7.	"Shy China"	3:23
8.	"Must Be Love"	4:13
9.	"Lonely"	4:54
10.	"For the Good Time"	4:15
11.	"Don't Walk Away"	6:32

== Singles ==
1. "Don't Walk From Love/Easy Come Easy Go" (1988)

== Personnel ==
- Andy Pierce - Vocals
- Jonnie Wee - Lead Guitar
- Dick Qwarfort - Bass
- George Swanson - Drums
- Roger White - Keyboards
