= Baja California (disambiguation) =

Baja California ('Lower California') is a state in Mexico.

Baja California may also refer to:

== Places ==
- Baja California peninsula, in northwestern Mexico
  - Baja California Province (1773–1824), a former province
  - Baja California Territory (1824–1931), a former territory
  - Republic of Baja California, a proposed state 1853–1854
  - Baja California desert, a desert ecoregion
- Baja California Sur, another state of Mexico
- Southern California, a region of the US state of California.

== Other uses ==
- Bajacalifornia, a genus of fish
- ARM Baja California, a patrol ship in the Mexican Navy

== See also ==
- Baja (disambiguation)
- California (disambiguation)
- Alta California (disambiguation)
