= California High School =

California High School may refer to:

- California High School (Pennsylvania) of California, Pennsylvania
- California High School (San Ramon, California)
- California High School (Whittier, California)

== See also ==
- List of high schools in California, for a highschool in California
- California (disambiguation)
