= Californië =

Californie may refer to:

- The French name of California
- An arrondissement in Casablanca in Morocco
- A neighborhood in Cannes, France
- Californie (film), a 2021 film

Californië may refer to:

- Californië, Gelderland, a hamlet in the Netherlands
- Californië, Limburg, a hamlet in the Netherlands
- the Dutch name of California
