= MV California Star =

California Star is the name of several ships, including

- MV California Star (1938), a Blue Star Line refrigerated ship built in 1938 and torpedoed and sunk in 1943 by the German submarine U-515
- MV California Star (1945), a wartime refrigerated fast cargo liner, built as Empire Clarendon later part of Blue Star Line
- MV California Star (1971), a refrigerated cargo ship of the Blue Star Line, later named Fremantle Star
- MV California Star (1980), a refrigerated container ship, built as Willowbank renamed California Star in 1980, and lastly named Golden Gate

== See also ==
- California Star (disambiguation)
