= Hotel Californian =

Hotel Californian may refer to:

- Hotel Californian (Fresno, California), listed on the National Register of Historic Places in Fresno County, California
- Hotel Californian (San Francisco, California), listed on the National Register of Historic Places in San Francisco, California

== See also ==
- Hotel California (disambiguation)
