= Alta California (disambiguation) =

Alta California was a province of New Spain.

Alta California may also refer to:

- The Daily Alta California or Alta Californian, a 19th century San Francisco newspaper
- Alta, California, a community in California, US

== See also ==
- California (disambiguation)
- Alta (disambiguation)
- Alto, California
- Baja California (disambiguation)
