= California Star =

California Star may refer to:

- California Star (newspaper), 1847 ancestor newspaper of The Daily Alta California
- California Star (album), 2012, by British band Martin Stephenson and the Daintees
- MV California Star, any of several ships

== See also ==
- California (disambiguation)
