= Californian =

Californian is an adjective describing something related to the American state of California. It is also the demonym for a person from California.

Californian or The Californian may also refer to:

== Publications in California ==
- The Californian (1840s newspaper), a Monterey newspaper moved to San Francisco
- The Californian (1860s newspaper), a San Francisco literary newspaper
- The Californian (1880s magazine), a San Francisco literary magazine
- The Californian Illustrated Magazine, an illustrated magazine about California (1891-1893?), edited by Charles Frederick Holder§The Californian Illustrated Magazine
- The Californian (Carmel-by-the-Sea newspaper), circa 1936–1937
- The Californian (Temecula), a now defunct newspaper
- The Bakersfield Californian, a Bakersfield newspaper
- The Salinas Californian, a Salinas newspaper
- The Daily Californian, the student newspaper at the University of California at Berkeley
- The Californian, the student newspaper of California High School in San Ramon
- Californian, a font designed by Frederic Goudy for the University of California Press

== Transportation ==
- Californian (ship), various ships
- Californian (train), a passenger train of the Southern Pacific and Rock Island railroads
- Californian, a coupe version of the British Hillman Imp automobile

== Film ==
- The Californians (disambiguation), several film and television topics
- The Californian (film), a 1937 Western

== Music ==
- The Californian (Bob Schneider album), 2006
- The Californian (Sunday's Best album), 2002

== See also ==
- California (disambiguation)
- Californian English, a dialect spoken in California
- List of Latin and Greek words commonly used in systematic names#C, a word in Latin found in species names
- List of people from California
