= Nasty Idols =

Swedish band

- Origin: Malmö, Sweden
- Genres: Glam metal, hard rock
- Years active: 1987–1995, 2006–2013
- Labels: Metal Heaven, Perris; HSM/CBS Records
- Past members: Andy Pierce; Dick Qwarfort; George Swanson; Roger White; Jonnie Wee; Peter Espinoza; Jörgen Ohlsson; Rikki Dahl; Stefan Nordeng; Roger Backlund
- Website: nastyidols.com

Nasty Idols were a Swedish glam metal, hard rock band from Malmö, Sweden, which was formed in 1987. After the band split in 1995 they reformed in 2006. Since then the band has released a fifth studio album Boy's town and a sixth album Kalifornia. Band frontman Andy Pierce died in 2013.

== History ==
=== Gigolos on Parole ===
The band first formed in 1987 with the lineup of Andy Pierce on (Vocals), Jonnie Wee on (Lead Guitar), Dick Qwarfort on (Bass), George Swanson on (Drums), Roger White on (Keyboards) and were more of a straight up glam metal in the style of bands such as Mötley Crüe, Poison & Hanoi Rocks. Their first gig was played at a local festival in Sweden taking inspiration from such acts as early Mötley Crüe, Kiss, Sweet and Alice Cooper. After the release of their self-financed single Don't Walk From Love/Easy Come, Easy Go they signed to independent label HSM/CBS Records. Their debut record was released soon after in 1989 named Gigolos on Parole which then followed by more shows and an ever increasing fan-base.

=== First line-up changes ===
Changes were soon made in the band's line-up resulting in Peter Espinoza coming into the line-up to replace Jonny Wee on (Lead Guitar) which led to recording of some of the first tracks for their next record. In 1991 the band released Cruel Intention which was greeted by a number of high rating reviews from numerous magazines. "Cool Way of Living", "Can't Get Ya' Off" and "Trashed N' Dirty" had music videos recorded for them and were played heavily on MTV's Headbangers Ball. The album was soon released afterwards in Germany and Japan.

=== Vicious ===
In 1993 the band released their third record, Vicious. The album did not do as well as their previous record, due in part to the decreasing hold the glam metal sound was having at the time over the mainstream. Interest was moving more to the new sound of grunge popularized by bands such as Alice in Chains, Nirvana and Soundgarden. Most hard rock bands resorted to changing their core sound to more of a darker and heavier tone as an attempt to pique interest in the genre. "Heads Down (In Tinseltown)" and "Ain't Got Nothin" were made as videos; the latter being a much darker one than previous releases.

=== Nasty Idol's demise ===
By 1994 the grunge wave had all but created a mass of lost interest in the glam metal genre which increasingly made life even harder for most bands. Some even resulted in using drugs a lot more as bands were not making much money from gigs or record sales. Peter Espinoza left the band at this time to move on with other projects that he had. A fourth record was known to be under development at the time named The Fourth Reich but the label soon went bankrupt before the record was finished. The record would later be released in 2002 as Heroes for Sale by Perris Records. The band split up in 1995.

=== Other projects ===
The band's remaining members tried their best through the years to survive through a more degrading music industry. The most notable band being Majestic, Peter Espinoza's brainchild, which enjoyed success in Japan, as well as vocalist Andy Pierce's band Machinegun Kelly and later United Enemies. American label Perris Records later re-released all of the band's studio record's including a best-of and 1995 record The Fourth Reich renamed as Heroes for Sale.

=== Reunion ===
As 2006 came the band was announced as playing a reunion gig at the Sweden Rock Festival. This was later followed by the release of The Rejects on the Road tour. Throughout the same year the band played numerous shows in Sweden which were then followed by playing gig's and touring in Italy and the UK. The band spent much of 2008 recording their follow-up to Vicious and Heroes For Sale named Boys Town. The 12-track album was later released on 27 April 2009 through Metal Heaven records. The record was met with a warm reception from fans, and some percentage of the media that still knew of the band outside of Sweden.

=== Kalifornia ===
The band went for a short break in 2010 to ready themselves for a comeback with them playing a few shows in the year. On their official website the band named a few songs for the next record; "Kalifornia", "Nitestalkin", "Without Mercy", "Jack In A Box", "Roadtrip" and "No More Rules".

Kalifornia was released on 3 July 2012.

=== 2013 ===
On 27 February 2013 the band revealed via their official website that founding member Dick Qwarfort had decided to leave the band.

On 5 December 2013 frontman Andy Pierce, the last remaining original member of the band, died suddenly at the age of 45, from a brain hemorrhage.

== Personnel ==
- Andy Pierce - vocals (1987-1995, 2006-2013; died 2013)
- Dick Qwarfort - bass (1987-1995, 2006-2013)
- George Swanson - drums (1987-1993)
- Roger White - keyboards (1987-1993)
- Jonnie Wee - guitar (1987-1990)
- Peter Espinoza - guitar (1990-1995, 2006-2013)
- Jörgen "Stanley" Ohlsson- drums (1993-1995; died 2016)
- Rikki Dahl - drums (2006-2013)
- Stefan "Zoak" Nordeng - bass (2013)

== Discography ==
=== Albums ===
- Gigolos on Parole (1989)
- Cruel Intention (1991)
- Vicious (1993)
- Heroes for Sale (2002)
- Boys Town (2009)
- Kalifornia (2012)

=== Singles ===
- "Don't Walk from Love/Easy Come Easy Go" (1988)
- "Alive N' Kickin'" (1990)

=== Compilation albums ===
- Best of Nasty Idols (2002)
- The Refused and Lost Tapes (2002)
- The Swedish Sleaze Collection (2006)

=== DVDs ===
- Rejects on the Road (2007)
