= Baja =

Baja or Bája may refer to:

== Places and jurisdictions ==
=== In the Americas ===
- Baja California Peninsula, in northwestern Mexico
- Baja California state in the northern part of the above peninsula
- Baja California Sur state in the southern part of the above peninsula
- Baja Verapaz, department of Guatemala

=== In Europe ===
- Bája, Hungarian name of Baia in Suceava County, Romania, a former capital and bishopric of Moldavia
- Baja, Hungary, city

== People ==
- Nedeljko Bajić Baja, Serbian folk singer
- Baja Mali Knindža, Bosnian Serb folk singer
- Baja Tamindžić, Serbian football goalkeeper

== Arts, entertainment, and media ==
- Baja (film), a 2018 American film
- Baja: Edge of Control, a 2008 video game
- "Baja", a 1963 song by The Astronauts
- "Baja", a 1993 song by Böhse Onkelz from Schwarz
- "Baja", a 1999 song by Sasha from Xpander

== Automobiles ==
- Baja bug, car originated for racing
- Subaru Baja, Subaru crossover automobile

== Sports ==
- Baja SAE, the SAE Mini Baja Competition
- Baja 1000, a Mexican off-road race
- Baja, short form of cross-country rally similar to rally raid

== Other uses ==
- Baja Jacket, a long-sleeved hooded pullover (garment)
- Patella baja, also known as attenuated patella alta, a pathology of the patella
- Baja Fresh, a Tex-Mex restaurant chain
- Baja Blast, a Taco Bell exclusive flavor of Mountain Dew
- Baja (plant), a genus of ferns

== See also ==
- Baha (disambiguation)
- Baja California (disambiguation)
- Bajan (disambiguation)
