= Hotelier (disambiguation) =

Hotelier usually refers to a hotel manager.

Hotelier may also refer to:

- Hotelier (South Korean TV series), a South Korean TV drama broadcast in 2001 in 20 episodes
- Hotelier (Japanese TV series), a Japanese TV drama broadcast in 2007 in 9 episodes
- The Hotelier, an American rock band

== See also ==
- Category:Hoteliers
- Hotel (disambiguation)
