= Bahaettin Rahmi Bediz =

Turkish photographer

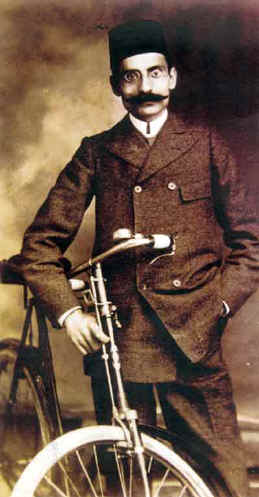
Rahmizâde Bahaeddin Portrait

Rahmizâde Bahaeddin Bediz (1875–1951), also known as Bahaettin Rahmi Bediz and Bahattin Bediz, is credited as being the first Turkish photographer by profession. He started his career in Kandiye, Crete, in 1895, where he acquired his original fame, went on to open photography studios in Istanbul in 1909 ("Photo Resne") and later in izmir. After 1935, in Ankara, he worked as the Chief of Photography Department in Turkish Historical Society, engaged in archeological photographic documentation.

The thousands of photographs (especially Cretan life, portraits and municipal and archaeological documentation) he took during his career (Crete, Istanbul, Izmir, Ankara) have immense historical value.

In 1927/1928, he prepared for the Municipality of İzmir the booklet "Album de Smyrne", in French and in Turkish, a collection of İzmir photographs taken by him supplemented with explanatory texts. The album, distributed abroad through Turkey's embassies and consular offices, is notable both by being one of the first information and promotion packages prepared by the young Republic of Turkey for international readership, and also for having been one of the last books printed in Turkey in Arabic script, coming shortly before the transition to Latin alphabet.

He is still revered also in Crete for having been the first to capture the people and the landscapes of the island.

His four sons, attained prominence on their own. Danyal Bediz was a professor of history at the University of Ankara (Dil, Tarih Fakultesi). Riza Bediz, who teamed up with his father at the end of Bahaettin's photographic business career, had studied art and architecture, became a respected educator in Istanbul. Rahmi Bediz, became a noted architect of 1940-1950s Turkey, was one of the architects of Anit Kabir, the Mausoleum of Atatürk in Ankara, which is recognized as one of 20th Century's significant architectural works. Pertev Bediz (Peter Bediz) also attained prominence by becoming one of the pioneers of geophysical exploration in the US and Canada. geophysical industry in Canada.

== Sources ==
- Girit'ten İstanbul'a Bahaettin Rahmi Bediz (Bahaettin Rahmi Bediz from Crete to Istanbul) by Seyit Ali Ak, ISBN 975-05-0276-0, İletişim Yayınları, 2004, Istanbul (in Turkish)
- Revue "İlgi" by the Turkish Historical Society (in Turkish)
