= Cruel Intention =

Studio album by Nasty Idols
- Released: 1991
- Genre: Glam metal, hard rock
- Label: HSM Records/CBS Records
- Producer: Berno Paulsson / Andy Pierce

Nasty Idols chronology
| Gigolos on Parole (1989) | Cruel Intention (1991) | Vicious (1993) |

Singles from Cruel Intention
- 1. "Alive N' Kickin'" Released: 1990

Cruel Intention is Nasty Idols second album release after 1989's debut Gigolos on Parole. The album was re-released in 2002 as the band's original label (HSM) had gone bankrupt in 1994.

== Track listing ==
| No. | Title | Length |
|---|---|---|
| 1. | "The Way Ya' Walk" | 4:37 |
| 2. | "Cool Way Of Living" | 3:22 |
| 3. | "American Nights" | 3:50 |
| 4. | "Don't Tear It Down" | 3:47 |
| 5. | "Alive N' Kickin'" | 4:07 |
| 6. | "House Of Rock N' Roll" | 4:17 |
| 7. | "B.I.T.C.H." | 3:51 |
| 8. | "Can't Get Ya' Off My Mind" | 5:13 |
| 9. | "Devil In Disguise" | 5:12 |
| 10. | "Westcoast City Rocker's" | 3:25 |
| 11. | "Trashed N' Dirty" | 4:16 |
| 12. | "Can't Get Ya' Off My Mind #2" | 4:28 |

=== Bonus tracks ===
1. "Sexshooter (Live Ver.)" -Only on the 2002 reissue-
2. "Electric Wonderland (Live Ver.)" -Only on the 2002 reissue-

== Singles ==
1. "Alive N' Kickin' (1990)

== Personnel ==
- Andy Pierce - Vocals
- Peter Espinoza - Lead Guitar
- Dick Qwarfort - Bass
- George Swanson - Drums
- Roger White - Keyboards
