= Chris Harte =

Chris Harte is an American newspaper executive and publisher. He has published newspapers in Minneapolis, Minnesota, Akron, Ohio, Portland, Maine and State College, Pennsylvania.

He was a corporate executive for Knight Ridder Newspapers and formerly the Chairman at the Star Tribune Company. He holds a bachelor's degree from Stanford University and an MBA from the University of Texas.

== Links ==
- http://www.minnpost.com/braublog/2009/09/publisher-chris-hartes-good-bye-letter-star-tribune-employees
- http://www.minnpost.com/politics-policy/2007/12/chris-harte-star-tribunes-maine-man
- https://web.archive.org/web/20101013171857/http://blogs.citypages.com/blotter/2008/05/strib_publisher.php
