= Bahaddin Gaziyev =

Azerbaijani journalist

Bahaddin Gaziyev (Azerbaijani: Bahəddin Həziyev; born 28 April 1965) is an Azerbaijani journalist and editor-in-chief of the opposition newspaper Bizim Yol ("Our Way") in Azerbaijan. He is also the deputy chairman of the Azerbaijan Popular Front Party (APFP). He worked for the radio "Liberty" and many newspapers.

== Attacked ==
On 18 May 2006, he was beaten by five unknown men in two cars, they blocked him while he was driving home, dragged him out of his car, and took him to the outskirts of Baku, where they beat him unconscious. His leg was broken in several points. Local residents took him to hospital. After one year of intensive medical care he returned to work. The Organization for Security and Co-operation in Europe office in Baku condemned the attack.
