= ARM California =

ARM California may refer to one of the following ships of the Mexican Navy named for the Gulf of California:

- ARM California (1947), the former Tacoma-class frigate USS Hutchinson (PF-45), launched August 1943; acquired by the Mexican Navy, 1947; scrapped, June 1964
- ARM California (H03), the former Crosley-class high speed transport USS Belet (APD-109), launched March 1944; acquired by the Mexican Navy, December 1963; reassigned pennant number of B03 prior to April 1970; wrecked in Baja California, January 1972

== See also ==
- ARM Baja California (PO-162), Oaxaca-class patrol ship
