= A. Baha Balantekin =

American-Turkish physicist

Akif Baha Balantekin
- Born: Ankara, Turkey
- Citizenship: USA, Turkish
- Scientific career
- Fields: Physicist (theoretical)
- Institutions: Yale University; University of Wisconsin-Madison

Akif Baha Balantekin earned his bachelor's degree in physics from Middle East Technical University, Ankara, Turkey in 1975 and received a PhD from Yale University in the U.S. in 1982.

Balantekin is currently the Eugene P. Wigner Professor of Physics at Department of Physics, University of Wisconsin, Madison. He has been in Madison, Wisconsin since 1986. Before this, he was the Eugene P. Wigner Fellow at the Oak Ridge National Laboratory. He has served as the Chair of the University of Wisconsin Physics Department until 2011. He is an affiliate professor at the University of Washington, Seattle and has been a visiting professor at Max Planck Institute for Nuclear Physics in Heidelberg, Germany, Tohoku University in Sendai, Japan, the National Astronomical Observatory of Japan in Mitaka, Tokyo, and the University of New South Wales, Sydney, Australia.

== Awards and honors ==
- American Physical Society Hans Bethe Prize, 2025;
- American Physical Society Division of Nuclear Physics Distinguished Service Award, 2010;
- Fellowships of the American Physical Society (1994) and the Institute of Physics of the U.K. (2004);
- TUBITAK Science Prize in Physics, 2001;
- Wisconsin Alumni Research Foundation Mid-Career Award, 1997;
- Alexander von Humboldt Foundation Senior Scientist Award, 1996;
- Japan Society for the Promotion of Science Senior Fellowship, 1994;

== Professional service ==
He has served as the Editor-in-Chief, Journal of Physics G: Nuclear and Particle Physics (2005–2010) and the Chair of the American Physical Society Division of Nuclear Physics (2003–2004). He has been the chair of the Scientific Board of the European Centre for Theoretical Studies in Nuclear Physics and Related Areas (ECT*) in Trento, Italy. He is currently an editor of the journal Physics Letters B.
