= Nedeljko Bajić Baja =

Nedeljko Bajić Baja Недељко Бајић Баја
- Bajić in 2009

Background information
- Also known as: Neno, Baja
- Born: Nedeljko Bajić; 9 June 1968 (age 58); Šipovo, SR Bosnia and Herzegovina, SFR Yugoslavia
- Genres: Pop-folk, Folk, Rock
- Occupation: Singer
- Years active: 1992–present
- Label: VIP Production (2005–09) BN Music (2009–present)
- Website: nedeljkobajicbaja.com

Nedeljko Bajić (Serbo-Croatian Cyrillic: Недељко Бајић; born 9 June 1968), known as Baja (Serbo-Croatian Cyrillic: Баја), is a Bosnian-Serbian pop-folk singer.

== Personal life ==
Bajić was born into a Bosnian Serb family in Šipovo, near Jajce in SR Bosnia and Herzegovina, Yugoslavia, and was raised with two brothers and two sisters. His father died in his early childhood.

He moved to Serbia in 1988, and lived in Novi Sad until 1999, when he moved to Belgrade, where he currently lives. Since 1991 he has also lived at times in Austria.

== Discography ==
- Vreme briše sve (1992)
- Eh Neno Neno (1994)
- Usijanje (1996)
- Ljubavnik (1997)
- Čežnja strast i mržnja (1998)
- Svetski čovek (1999)
- Došlo vreme (2002)
- Koktel ljubavi (2004)
- Zapisano u vremenu (2007)
- Album dragih uspomena (2010)
- Snovi od stakla (2014)
