= Vicious (Nasty Idols album) =

Studio album by Nasty Idols
- Released: 1993
- Genre: Hard rock
- Label: HSM Records/CBS Records
- Producer: Berno Paulsson/Andy Pierce

Nasty Idols chronology
Cruel Intention (1991)	Vicious (1993)	Heroes for Sale (2002)

Vicious is Nasty Idols third album release after 1991's Cruel Intention. The album was re-released in 2002 as the band's original label (HSM) had gone bankrupt in 1994.

== Track listing ==
No.	Title	Length
1.	"Head's Down (In Tinseltown)"	4:02
2.	"Hellhouse"	3:12
3.	"Dance Of The Wicked"	3:30
4.	"Ain't Got Nothing"	3:48
5.	"R.I.P."	4:01
6.	"Pretty Cut Wild"	3:17
7.	"Blackshot"	5:21
8.	"No Time"	3:05
9.	"Killing Stuff"	3:14
10.	"Do Ya' Want Another"	4:21
11.	"Hellout Shakeout"	3:32
12.	"Electric Wonderland"	4:47
13.	"Over N' Gone"	3:59

=== Bonus tracks ===
1. "Hurt Me" -Only on 2002 reissue-
2. "Forest Of Cries" -Only on 2002 reissue-

== Personnel ==
- Andy Pierce - Vocals
- Peter Espinoza - Lead Guitar
- Dick Qwarfort - Bass
- Stanley - Drums
