= California, Santander =

Coordinates: 7°21′N 72°58′W

- Municipality and town
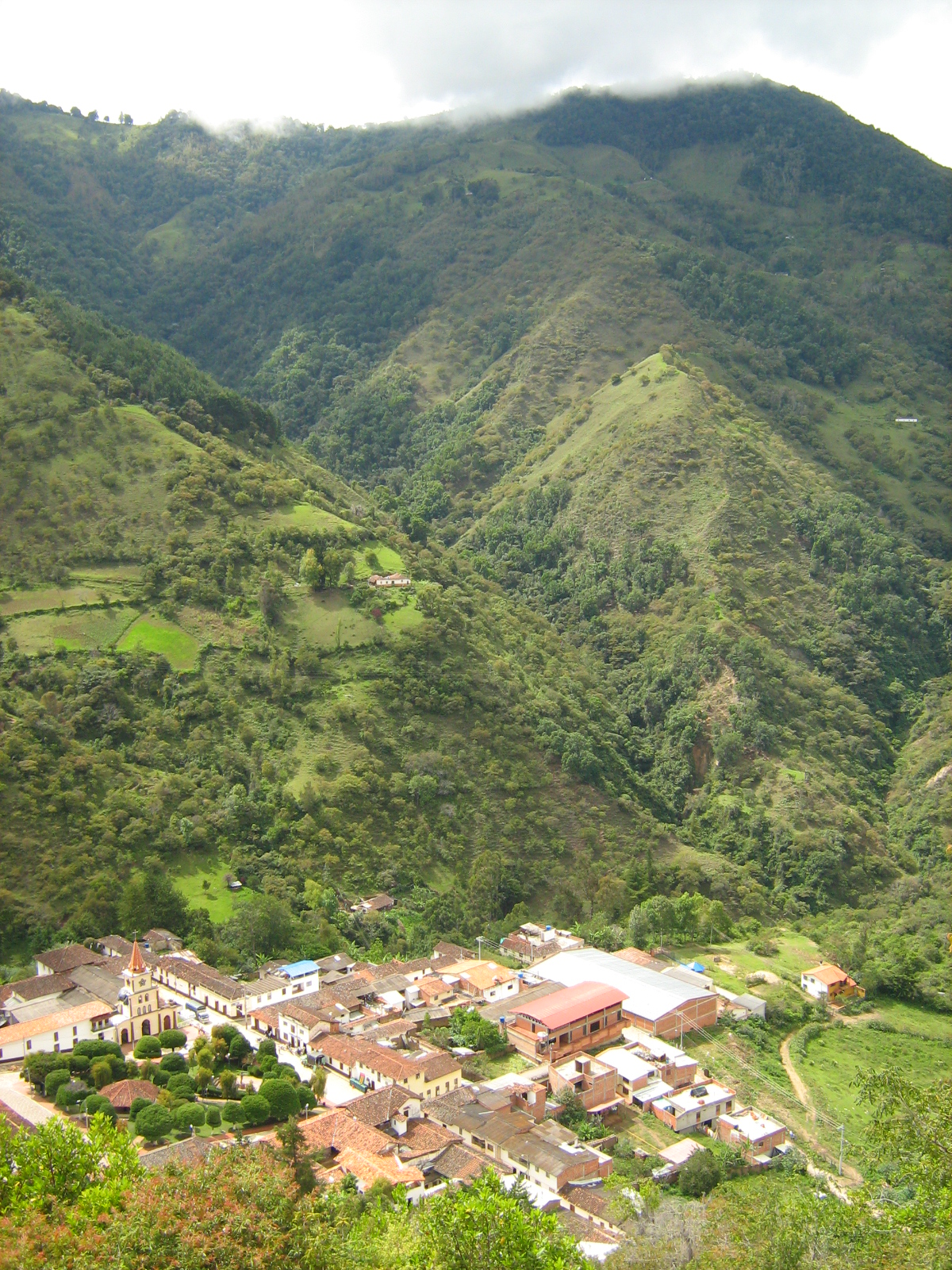

- Flag Coat of arms

- Location of the municipality and town of California in the Santander Department of Colombia.
- Country: Colombia
- Department: Santander Department
- Elevation: 2,005 m (6,578 ft)
- Time zone: UTC-5 (Colombia Standard Time)
- Climate: Cfb

California is a town and municipality in the Santander Department in northeastern Colombia.
