= Kalifornia (album) =

Studio album by Nasty Idols
- Released: 3 July 2012
- Recorded: 2011
- Genre: Sleaze rock, hard rock
- Length: 46:35
- Label: Parris Records
- Producer: Matti Engdahl and Nasty Idols

Nasty Idols chronology
Boys Town (2009)	Kalifornia (2012)

Kalifornia is Nasty Idols sixth and final album release after 2009's Boy's town.

== Track listing ==
No.	Title	Length
1.	"No more rules"
2.	"Kalifornia"
3.	"1969(this ain't the summer of love)"
4.	"Night by Night"
5.	"Nightstalkin'"
6.	"Sister Sin"
7.	"Pleasure of the Pain"
8.	"Roadtrip"
9.	"Sweet Suicide"
10.	"Jack in the Box"
11.	"Since U Been Gone"

== Personnel ==
- Andy Pierce - Vocals and acoustic guitar
- Peter Espinoza - Lead guitar and synthesizers
- Dick Qwarfort - Bass
- Rikki Dahl - Drums

Additional musicians:

- Matti Engdahl - Hammond organ (3,11)
