= Pizza California =

Japanese pizza restaurant chain

Pizza California (ピザ・カリフォルニア, Piza Kariforunia) is a pizza chain in Japan. Franchises of the chain are located in 26 of Japan's 47 prefectures. The company has its headquarters in the Hiei Kudan-Kita Building in Kudankita, Chiyoda, Tokyo.

The company's slogan is "Hand made deliciousness, Local preference".
