= Christopher K. Hart =

American businessman

Christopher K. Hart was the President and Vice Chairman of First California Mortgage in Petaluma, California. Hart was responsible for restarting First Cal in 2002. His responsibilities include overseeing the general direction of the company, as well as negotiating and structuring the company’s relationship with Wall Street, secondary market investors and depository banks.

He is a licensed California real estate broker and was member of both the Fannie Mae Western Region Advisory Board and Freddie Mac Advisory Boards from 2007 to 2011.

== Personal ==
Hart resides in Northern California, with his wife and three children.
