= Californië, Limburg =

Coordinates: 51°25′N 6°07′E

Californië is a hamlet in the Dutch province of Limburg. It is located in the municipality of Horst aan de Maas, about 3 km west of Grubbenvorst and northwest of Venlo.
