= Heroes for Sale (Nasty Idols album) =

Studio album by Nasty Idols
- Released: 2002
- Genre: Hard rock, sleaze rock
- Label: Perris Records
- Producer: Berno Paulsson/Nasty Idols

Nasty Idols chronology
Vicious (1993)	Heroes for Sale (2002)	Boy's Town (2009)

Heroes for Sale is Nasty Idols fourth album release. Originally, the album was set for release in 1995 under the name The Fourth Reich. The album was released in 2002 under the revised name by Perris Records, as the band's original label (HSM) had gone bankrupt back in 1994.

== Track listing ==
No.	Title	Length
1.	"Hero For Sale"	5:08
2.	"Down"	3:33
3.	"Sheila"	3:42
4.	"Cool Runnings"	3:55
5.	"Too Drunk To Fuck"	3:08
6.	"Wish You We're Alive"	5:25
7.	"Blind Leads Blind"	4:24
8.	"Dead By Dawn"	4:51
9.	"When The Blood Runs Cold"	5:42
10.	"Generation Landslide"	4:31
11.	"Give Me No Lip"	4:03

== Personnel ==
- Andy Pierce - Vocals
- Peter Espinoza - Lead Guitar
- Dick Qwarfort - Bass
- Stanley - Drums
