= First California Mortgage =

First California Mortgage Company
- Company type: Private company
- Industry: Finance
- Founded: 1977
- Founder: Dennis Hart
- Defunct: 2018
- Fate: Unknown
- Headquarters: Petaluma, CA, United States
- Key people: Christopher K. Hart (President)
- Products: Financial services
- Number of employees: 350+ (2013)
- Divisions: Wholesale, Retail, Consumer Direct
- Website: www.firstcal.net

First California Mortgage Company (First Cal) was an American mortgage lender based in Petaluma, California, that had branches in Arizona, California, Colorado, Hawaii, Nevada, Texas, and Washington until the company was closed down. First Cal provided mortgage loans in these states plus Idaho, New Mexico and Oregon, and previously provided loans in 42 U.S. states.

As of 2013, First Cal had funded more than 300,000 home loans, mostly in California, and had a Better Business Bureau rating of A−. The company no longer has a rating and appears to no longer be in business.

Prior to its shutdown, First Cal offered purchased and refinance programs with a variety of loan programs, including FHA, VA, HomePath, and jumbo loans.

== History ==
First Cal was founded in 1977 by Dennis Hart to provide builder and retail financing. In 1986 they expanded, opening a wholesale division called Headlands Mortgage. First Cal sold its loan and servicing operations to a fortune 500 company in 1995. Three years later, Headlands was taken public (NASDAQ: HDLD) prior to being sold to GreenPoint Mortgage in 1999.

In 2003, First Cal resumed mortgage lending to serve mortgage brokers and retail borrowers in the San Francisco Bay Area behind President Christopher K Hart, son of Dennis Hart. Today, First Cal holds licenses to lend in 9 states.

== Community service ==
In 2010, First Cal had a silver sponsor and participates as a team in the American Cancer Society's Relay for Life. First Cal also participates in The Pajama Program, which provided pajamas and books to children in need.
