= 341 California =

Main-belt asteroid

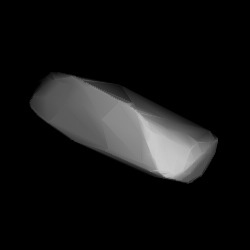
- Shape model of California

Discovery
- Discovered by: Max Wolf
- Discovery site: Heidelberg Obs.
- Discovery date: 25 September 1892

Designations
- Named after: California
- Alternative designations: 1892 J; 1979 FY2
- Minor planet category: Main belt

Orbital characteristics
- Epoch 31 July 2016 (JD 2457600.5)
- Uncertainty parameter 0
- Observation arc: 113.45 yr (41,439 d)
- Aphelion: 2.62698 AU (392.991 Gm)
- Perihelion: 1.77187 AU (265.068 Gm)
- Semi-major axis: 2.19943 AU (329.030 Gm)
- Eccentricity: 0.19439
- Orbital period (sidereal): 3.26 yr (1,191.4 d)
- Mean anomaly: 15.6325°
- Mean motion: 0° 18^{m} 7.783^{s} / day
- Inclination: 5.66900°
- Longitude of ascending node: 29.0469°
- Argument of perihelion: 293.875°

Physical characteristics
- Dimensions: 14.67±0.9 km 15 km
- Mean density: ~2.7 g/cm^{3}
- Synodic rotation period: 317.88 h (13.25 d)
- Geometric albedo: 0.4950±0.064; 0.495
- Spectral type: S
- Asteroid family: Flora family
- Absolute magnitude (H): 10.55

341 California is an asteroid belonging to the Flora family in the Main Belt. It was discovered by Max Wolf on 25 September 1892 in Heidelberg, and is named for the U.S. state of California. This object is orbiting the Sun at a distance of 2.20 AU with a period of 3.26 yr and an eccentricity (ovalness) of 0.19. The orbital plane is inclined at an angle of 5.7° to the plane of the ecliptic.

The very slow rotation rate of this asteroid favors collecting photometric data for an extended period in order to measure the period. Data collected from June to December 2016 was used to produce a light curve showing a rotation period of 317.88±0.06 h with a brightness variation of 0.9 in magnitude. It is tumbling with a period of 250±2 h. It has an unusually high albedo.
