= SS California =

SS California may refer to the following ships:

- SS California (1848), a United States paddle wheel mail steamer built in 1848 for the Pacific Mail Steamship Company which was wrecked near Pacasmayo, Peru in 1895
- SS California (1864), a 168-foot schooner-rigged passenger freighter built in Mystic, Connecticut as the Little California. She came to the west coast in 1866, and for several years made runs to Alaska. Renamed Eureka sometime between 1877 and 1889. According to Santa Cruz Island Company records, Eureka carried cargo for the Santa Cruz Island Company for a decade from 1889 through 1897. In 1891 she was acquired by the Pacific Coast Steamship Company. Eureka was scrapped in San Francisco in 1898
- SS California (1872), a UK passenger and cargo ship built 1872 for the Anchor Line and scrapped in 1904
- SS California (1890), sailing ship built by Harland and Wolff in 1890 for North Western Shipping
- SS California (1902), a UK passenger ship built in 1902 for the Pacific Steam Navigation Company and torpedoed on 17 October 1917
- SS California (1907), a UK passenger ship built in 1907 and torpedoed on 7 February 1917
- SS West Hixton, a US cargo ship built in 1920 and later renamed California
- SS California (Los Angeles, 1920), a cargo ship torpedoed and sunk in World War II
- SS California (Scotts, 1920), an ocean liner built in Scotland in 1920 as Albania and later renamed California by her Italian owners
- SS Helen Vinmont, a US oil tanker built in 1921, renamed SS Agwismith and then renamed SS California
- SS California (1923), a UK ocean liner built in 1923 and sunk by German air attack in 1943
- SS California (1927), a US ocean liner built in 1928 for the Panama Pacific Line; renamed Uruguay in 1938 and scrapped in 1964

== See also ==
- USS California
- SS Californian
- Californian (ship)
