= California's 1st district =

California's 1st district may refer to:

- California's 1st congressional district
- California's 1st State Assembly district
- California's 1st State Senate district
