= California, West Virginia =

Unincorporated community in West Virginia, United States

California
- Unincorporated community
- Location within the state of West Virginia California (the United States)
- Coordinates: 39°7′40″N 81°18′28″W
- Country: United States
- State: West Virginia
- County: Wirt
- Time zone: UTC-5 (Eastern (EST))
  - Summer (DST): UTC-4 (EDT)
- ZIP codes: 26180

California is a ghost town in northern Wirt County, West Virginia. It lies along the Hughes River, between the river and West Virginia Route 47 (the Parkersburg and Staunton Turnpike), about half a mile below the Ritchie County line, and just above the intersection of Route 47 with California House Road, or County Route 47–1.

California is notable as a point where shallow deposits of petroleum naturally percolated to the Earth's surface, a phenomenon common in the area, which spurred settlement at nearby Petroleum in Ritchie County, and Burning Springs, about fifteen miles south of California in Wirt County. Oil from the California area was being collected and used as a commercial lubricant as early as the 1820s. The first oil well at California was sunk in 1859 by Charles Shattuck and T. T. Jones, at about the same time as the well sunk by Edwin Drake near Titusville, Pennsylvania, often referred to as the first commercial oil well. This has led to some dispute as to which well was the earlier; Drake began drilling some months earlier, but did not discover oil until August 28.

After the Civil War, the development of more productive oil fields led to the gradual abandonment of oil production at small wells such as those at California, Petroleum, and Burning Springs. In 1924, there were six houses and eleven oil wells in the immediate vicinity, and fifteen more wells along a ridge on the south side of the Hughes River; in 1957, there were three wells remaining at or near California, and four more across the river. Today, a historical display including a replica oil derrick stands along route 47 just west of California House Road.
