= Hotel California (disambiguation) =

"Hotel California" is a song by the Eagles.

Hotel California may also refer to:

- Hotel California (album), an Eagles album that includes their hit song of the same name
- Hotel California, a hotel built in 1947 in Todos los Santos, Baja California Sur, Mexico
- Hotel California, a 2008 American thriller film with Erik Palladino
- Hotel California (Tyga album), a 2013 album
- Hotel California (2013 film), an Indian film
- Hotel California, a song by Joji from his 2026 album Piss in the Wind
- Cook County Jail in Chicago, Illinois, nicknamed Hotel California for its location on California Avenue

== See also ==
- Hotel Californian (disambiguation)
- California Hotel, Oakland, California, U.S.
- California Hotel and Casino, Las Vegas, Nevada, U.S.
- Motel California, a 1996 album by Ugly Kid Joe
- Hotel Kalifornia, a 2022 album by Hollywood Undead
