= Bahauddin Baha =

Afghan judge

Bahauddin Baha (بهاءالدين بهاء )، (Jurist of Islamic law, author, poet, born in Herat Province, Afghanistan) was Deputy Chief Justice of the Afghan Supreme Court from 2006 to 2016. Baha also served as a Supreme Court Justice and member of the High Judicial Council of the Supreme Court during the 1980s. Baha served as head of Prime Minister Mohammad Musa Shafiq’s office (1972-1973). In 2002, Baha was appointed as Chairman of the Independent Judicial Reform Commission, one of the three commissions established as part of the Bonn Agreement. Baha later served as Legal Advisor to Afghan President Hamid Karzai. Subsequently, he was nominated and appointed to the Afghan Supreme Court in 2006.

Justice Baha was a senior member of the High Judicial Council of the Supreme Court and served as the Deputy Chief Justice and President of the Criminal Tribunal of the Supreme Court.

Justice Baha has authored two books in Persian, حقيقت تصوف و بحثي از طريقهء نقشبنديه and محمد (ص) پيامبر آزادي, although neither is directly related to contemporary law. His writings and many articles and poems have been published in various judicial, religious, and cultural journals and publications.
