= Volkswagen California =

2003 model of campervan

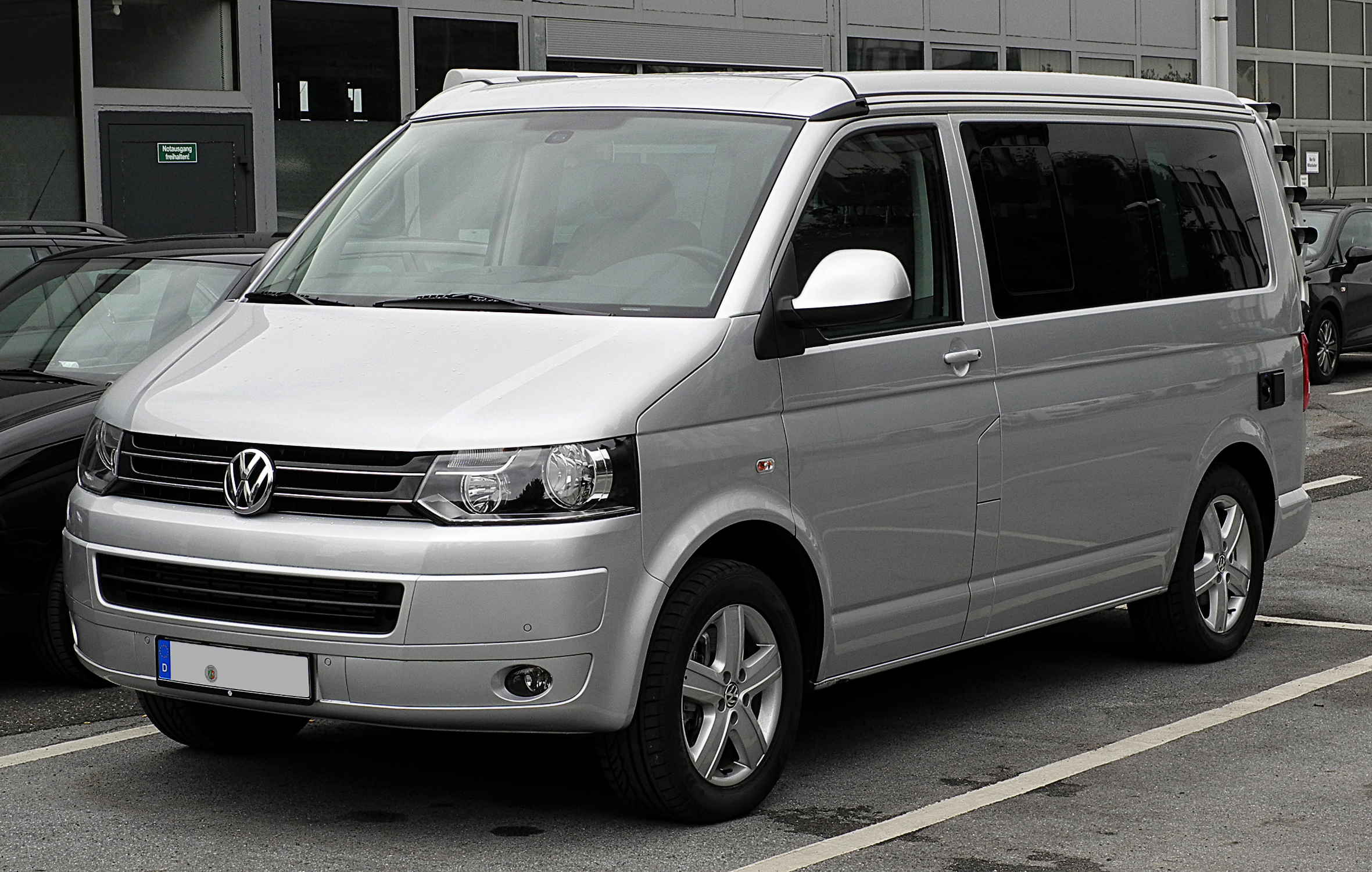

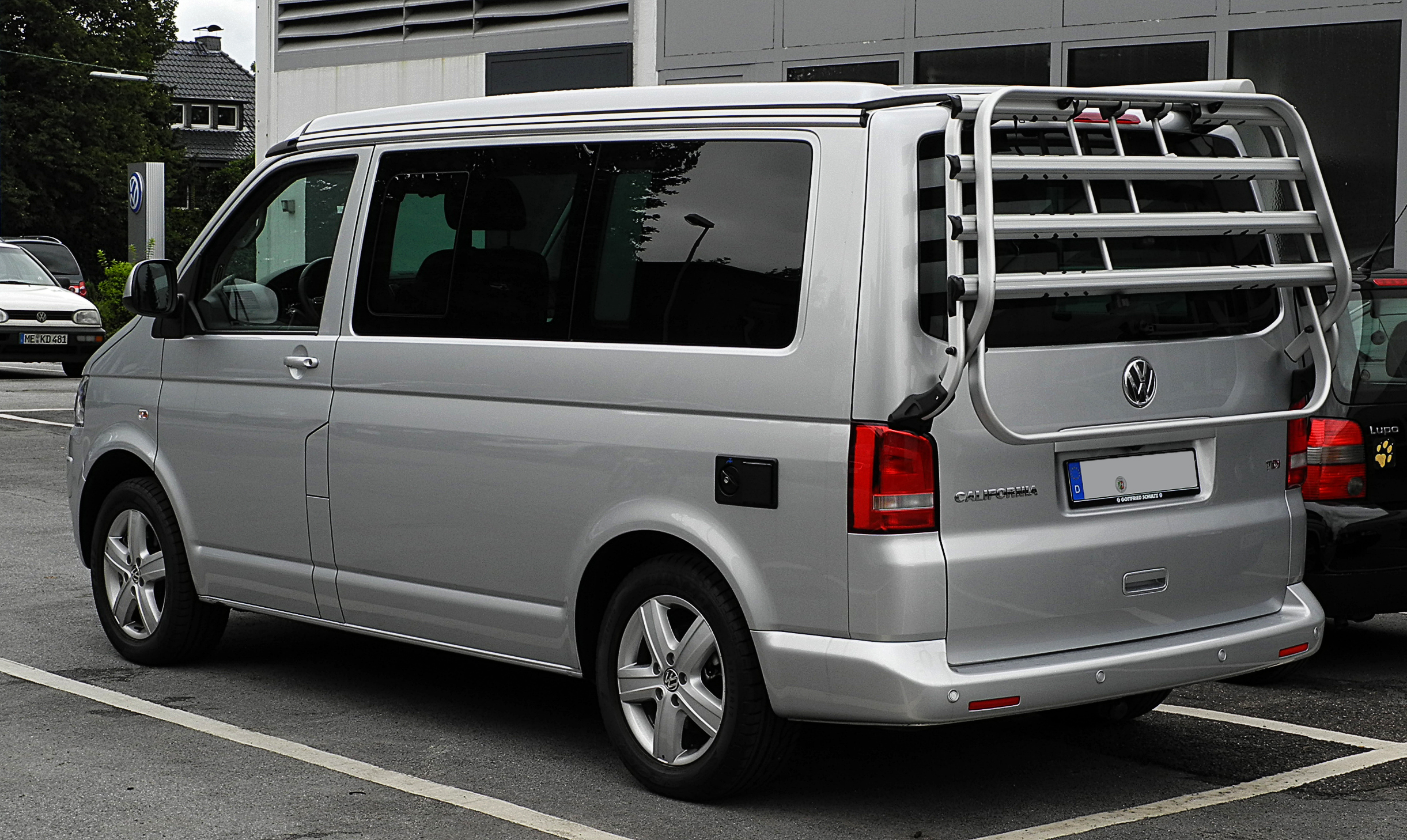
California Europe in Germany

The Volkswagen California is a campervan based on the mid-sized Transporter panel van, developed by Volkswagen Commercial Vehicles (VWCV) and sold since 2003. It is the first campervan designed and built in-house by VWCV Special Business Unit, a subsidiary of Volkswagen Commercial Vehicles.

Previously, Volkswagen offered the Volkswagen Westfalia Camper manufactured by Westfalia; the chassis were manufactured for Westfalia exclusively by Volkswagen. When Westfalia was acquired by DaimlerChrysler in 2001, VW decided to design and build their own campervan range, based on the Transporter range. The VWCV-designed campervan originally was called the Volkswagen Westfalia to provide branding continuity when it was launched in 2003; once Westfalia became its own company in 2005, VW rebranded it as the Westfalia California until 2012, when it received its present name.

Since then, VWCV have developed larger (Grand California, 2019) and smaller (Caddy California, 2021) campervans to fill out the line, based on the Crafter and Caddy, respectively.

== History ==
The VWCV-designed Westfalia California, based on the T4 Transporter, was launched in August 2003. In 2004 two design studies were presented at the Caravan Salon in Düsseldorf: California Beach and California Tramper. VWCV expanded the range in 2005 with the California (Multivan/Kombi) Beach, to bridge the gap between the Multivan/Kombi people carriers and the California.

By 2005, people could place an order for delivery of the Westfalia California, now based on the T5 Transporter. At the 2007 Caravan Salon in Düsseldorf, VWCV launched the new Westfalia California Beach with pop top bed, as seen in the higher specified versions of the California range. In 2013, under the launch of the T5.1 (T5 facelift) Volkswagen shortened the name of the vehicle to the "Volkswagen California". They also introduced two new versions of their new van, "California Tramper" and "California Beach".

In 2016, VW reintroduced the California for the launch of the new T6 Transporter, VW also changed the tramper into the "California Ocean" and continued offering the "California Beach". In 2019, the T6.1 California was launched at Düsseldorf with a third model coming out. The "California Coast" was introduced as a halfway line between the "California Ocean" and "California Beach". In 2022, the Coast variant of the California range was dropped across all worldwide markets.

The T7 Multivan also was released in 2022, but there was no corresponding California campervan models. The next iteration of the California instead will be based on the battery-electric ID. Buzz, of which the base vehicle is to be launched in 2023. However in 2023, Volkswagen announced the “California Universe” which was announced and explaining that the California was being offered on three different vans: The Multivan, The ID. Buzz and the new T7 Van giving a much bigger range.

=== New sizes ===
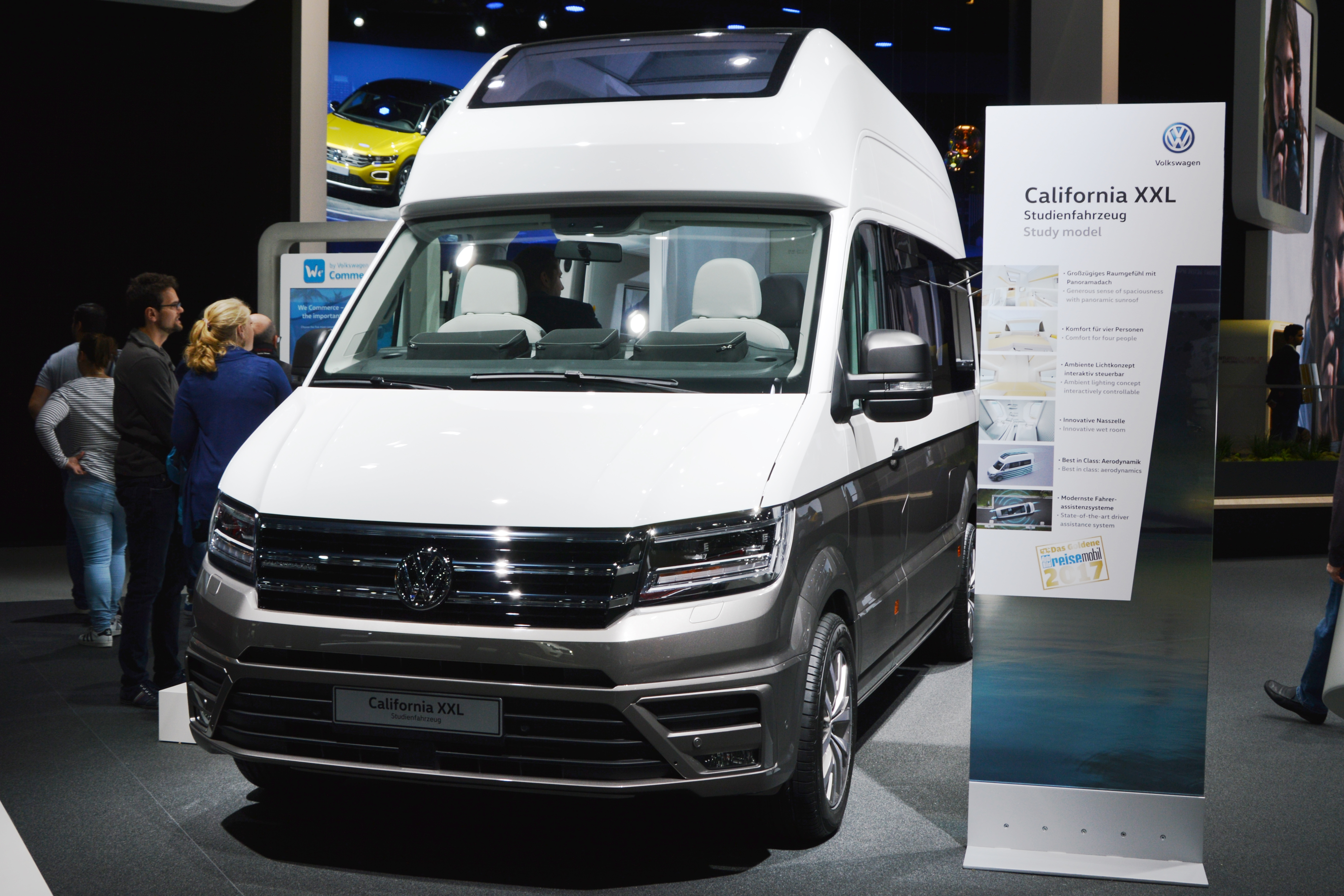
2017: Concept vehicle California XXL on the basis of the VW Crafter

At the International Motor Show 2017, a VW California XXL concept was presented, based on the VW Crafter. The 6.2 m (20 ft) long vehicle has an interior standing height of 2.2 m (7 ft 3 in) and is equipped with underfloor heating. The series model VW Grand California went on sale in 2019.

=== Trim lines ===
Volkswagen California trims
		Beach		Coast	Ocean (Note: aka Tramper, SE)
		Camper	Tour	Coast	Ocean
T4
T5
T5.1
T6	Seats	4 (5/7 opt.)		N/A	4 (5 opt.)
T6.1	Seats	4 (5 opt.)	5 (6/7 opt.)	4 (5 opt.)	4 (5 opt.)

== Models ==
=== Overview ===
==== Current ====
- T7 California (based on the T7 Multivan)
- Caddy California (based on the Caddy Typ SB)
- Grand California (based on the Crafter)

==== Future ====
- ID.Buzz California (202?)

==== Discontinued ====
- T1 Westfalia (1955–1964)
- T2 Westfalia (1965–1979)
- T3 Westfalia (1979–1991)
- T4 Westfalia California (1992–2005)
- T5 California (2005–2010)
- T5.1 California (2010–2015)
- T6 California (2016–2019)
- T6.1 California (2019–2024)
Westfalia/California campervans

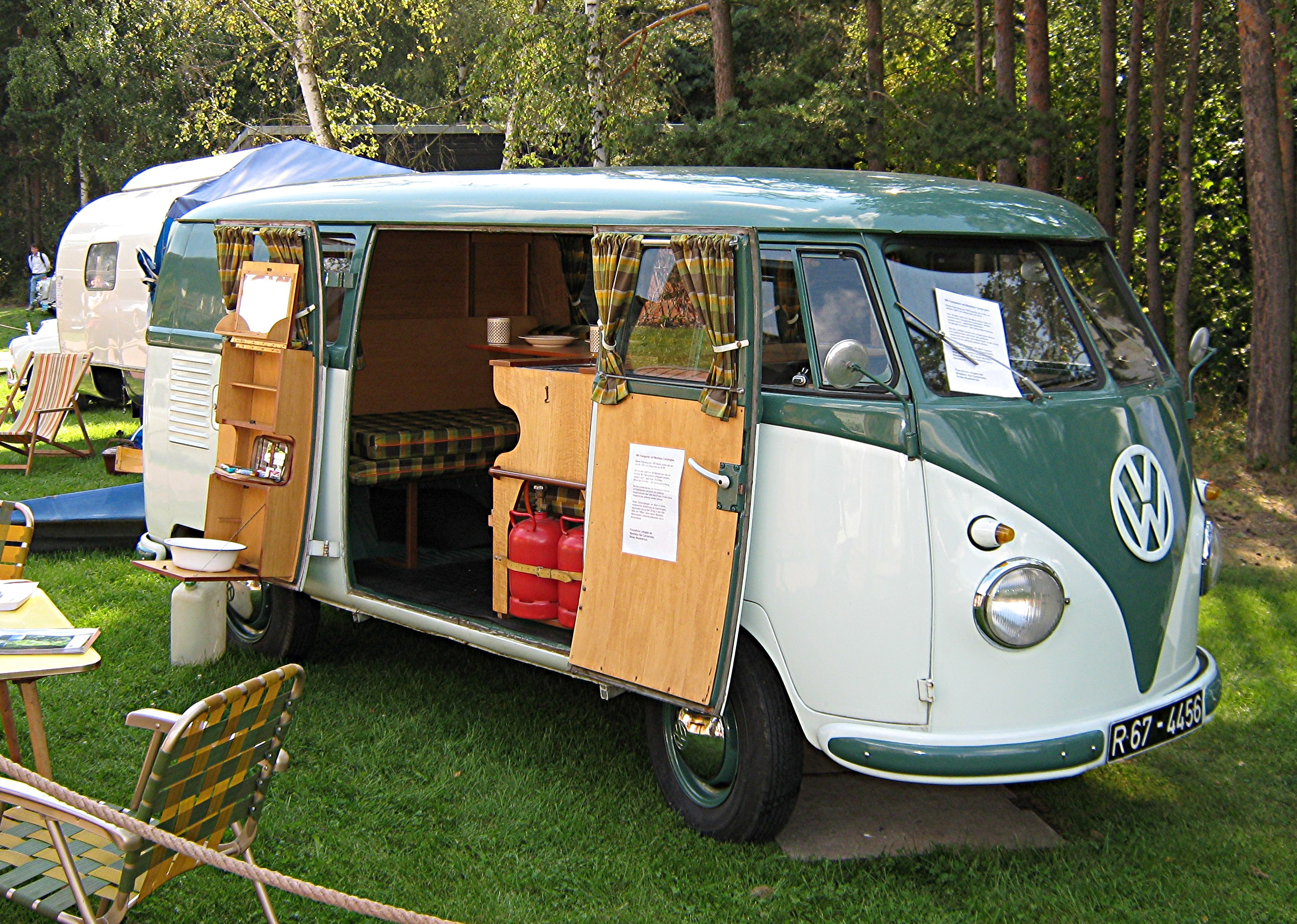
T1 Westfalia

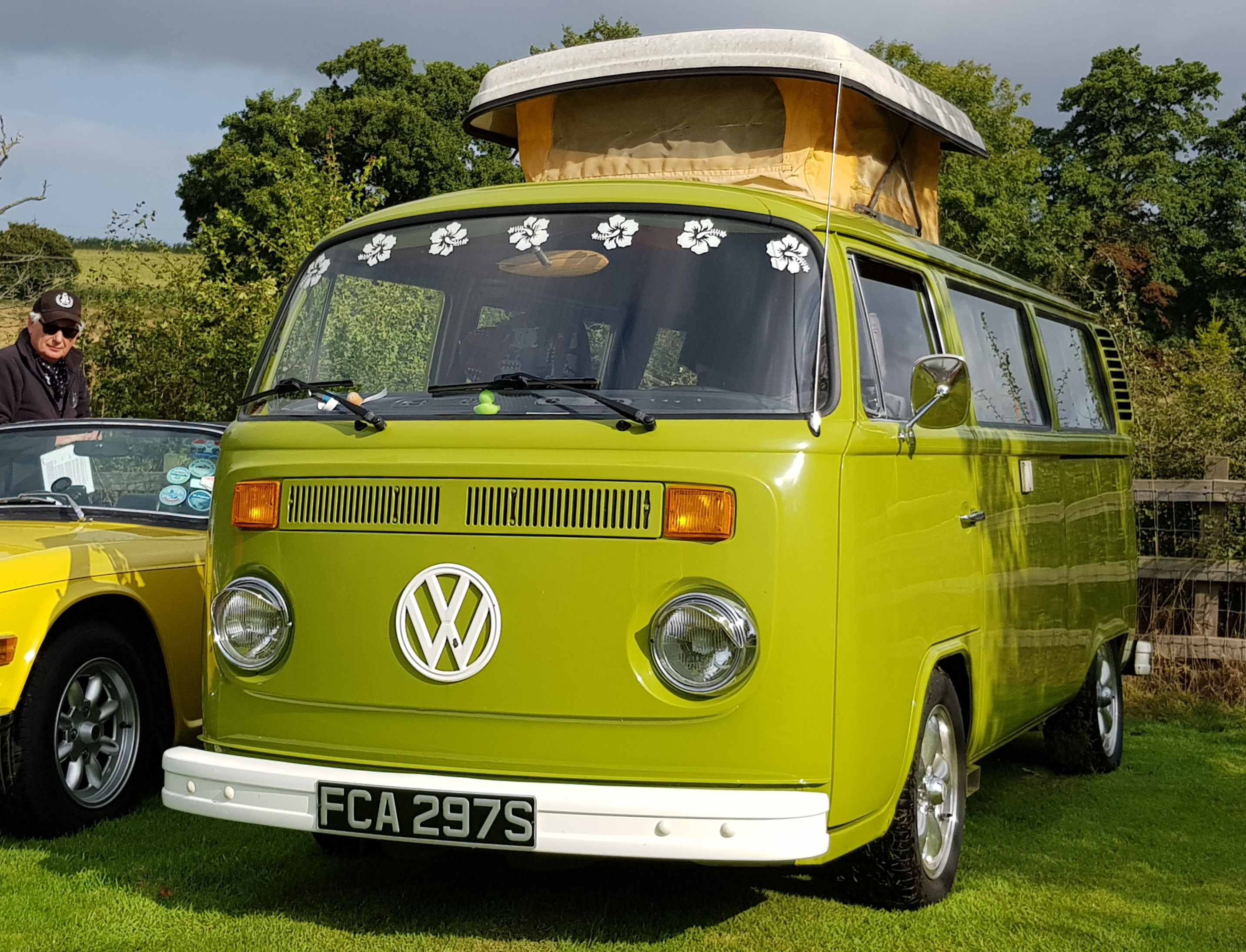
T2 Westfalia

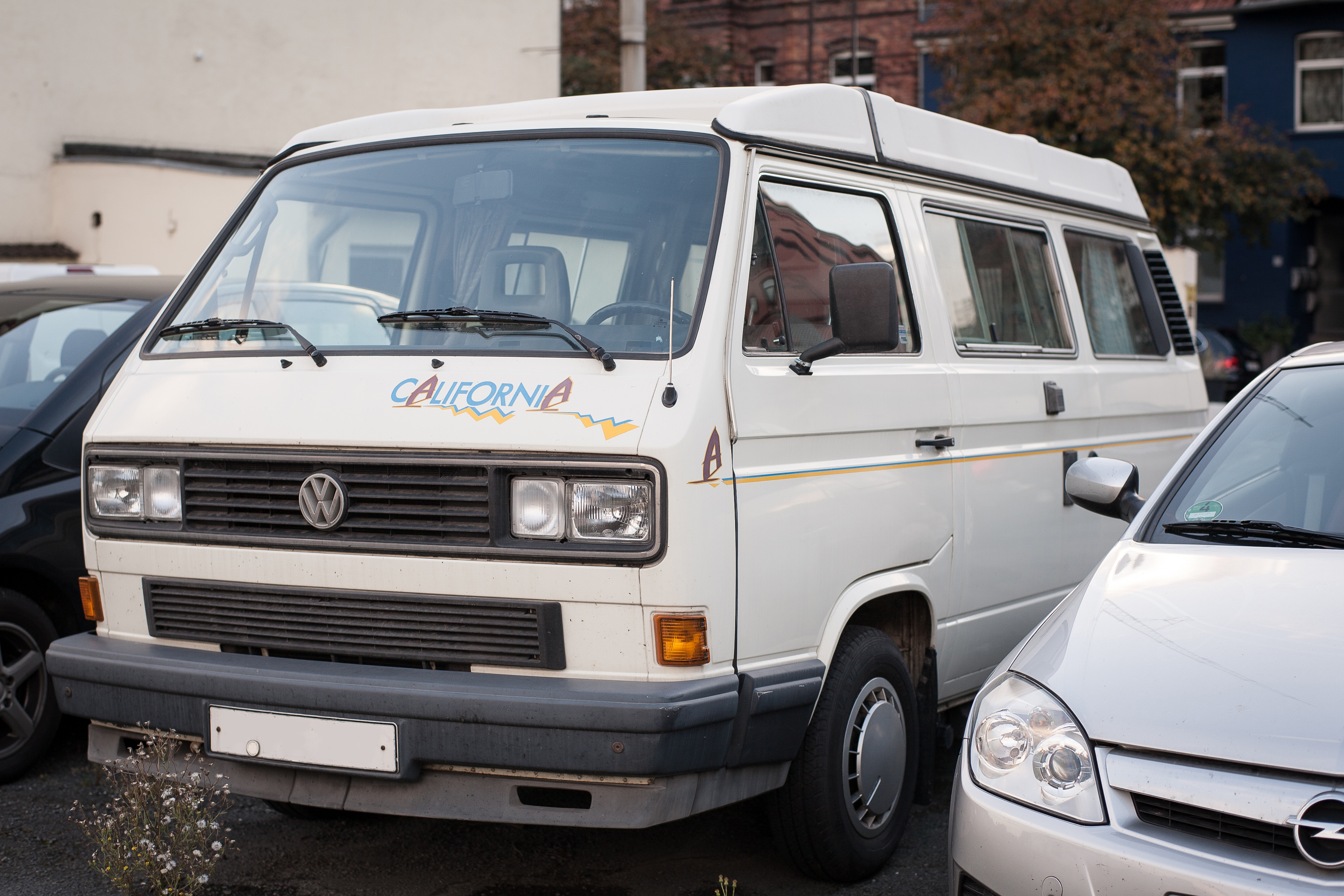
T3 Westfalia

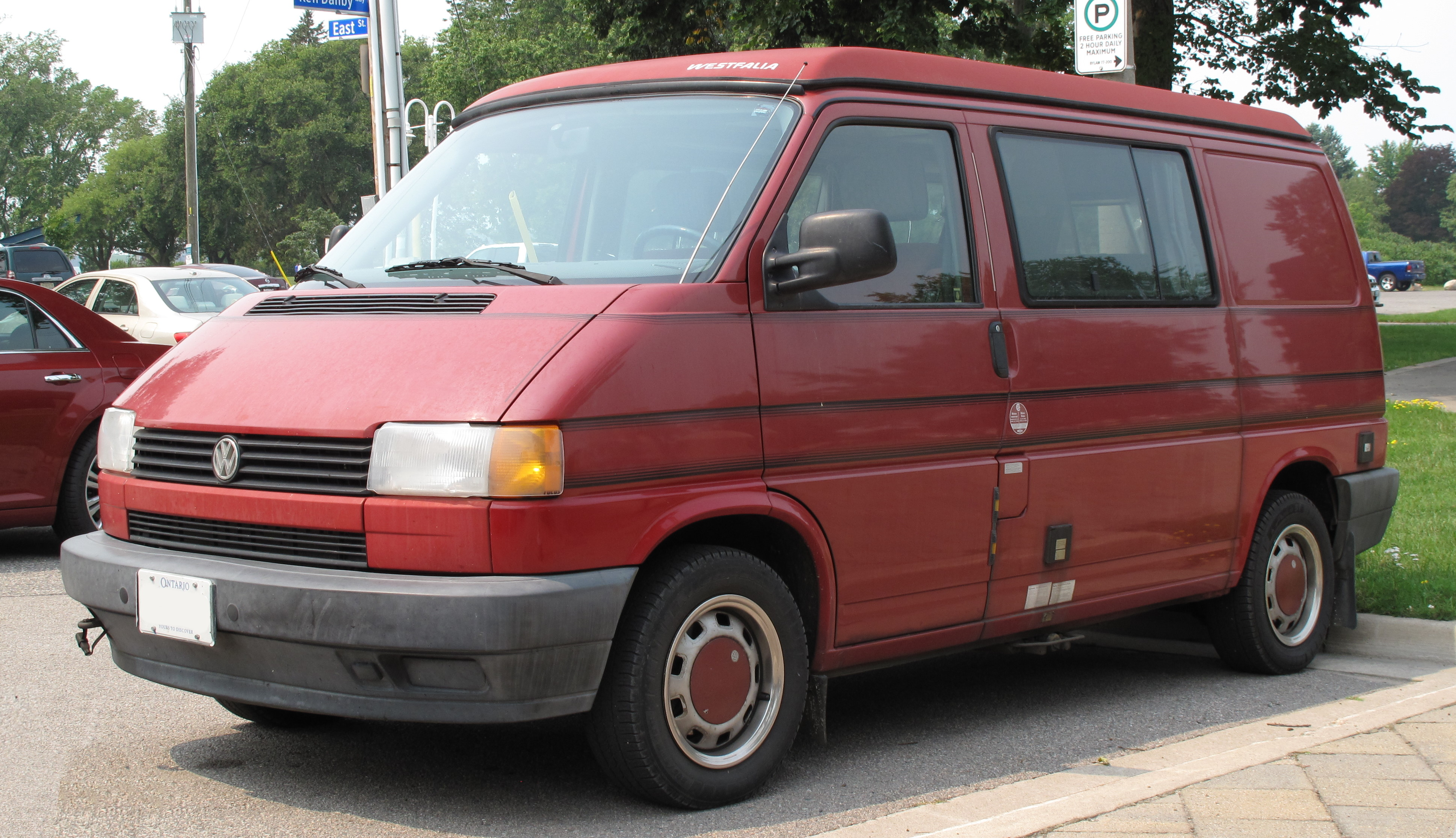
T4 Westfalia

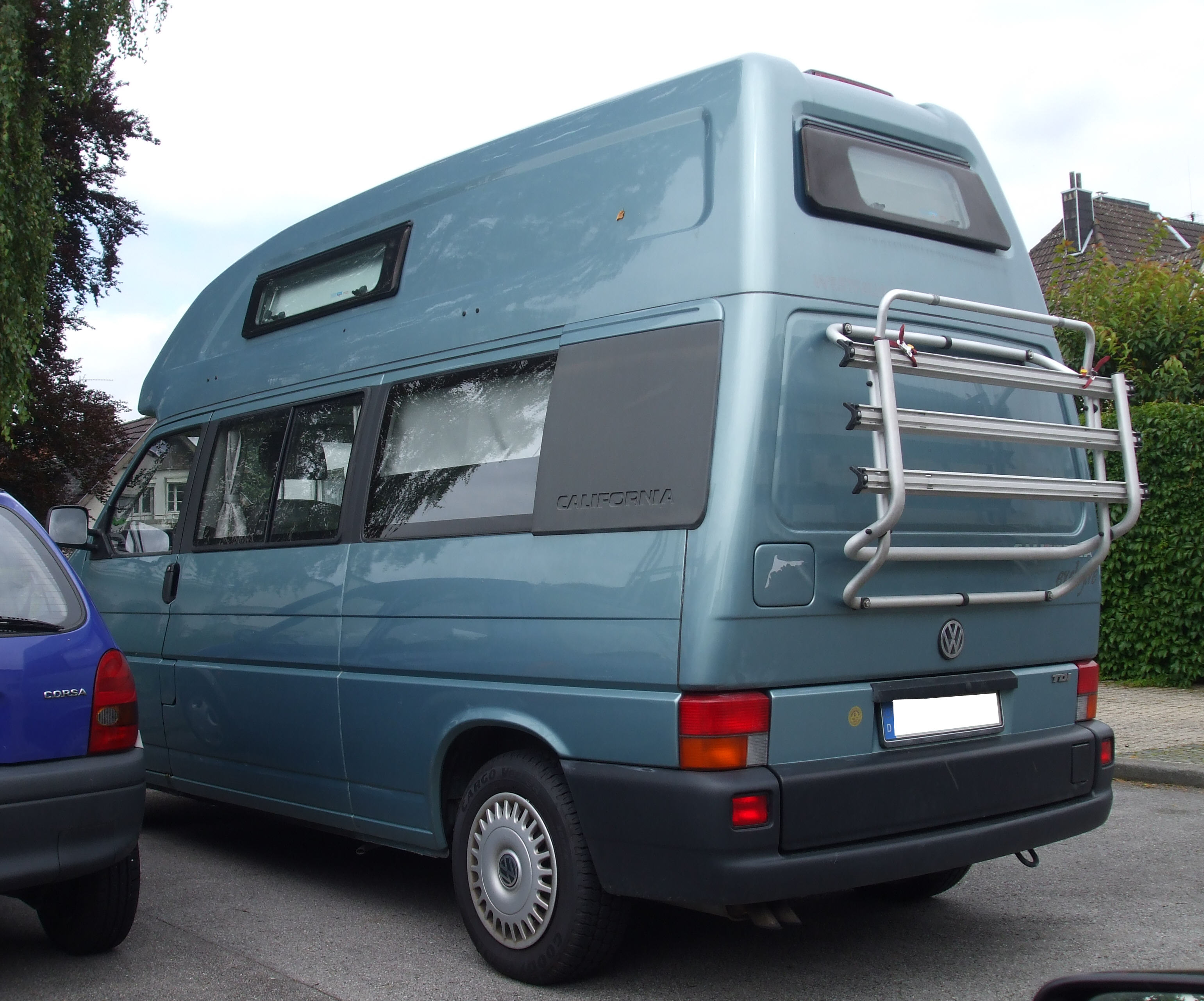
T4 Westfalia California

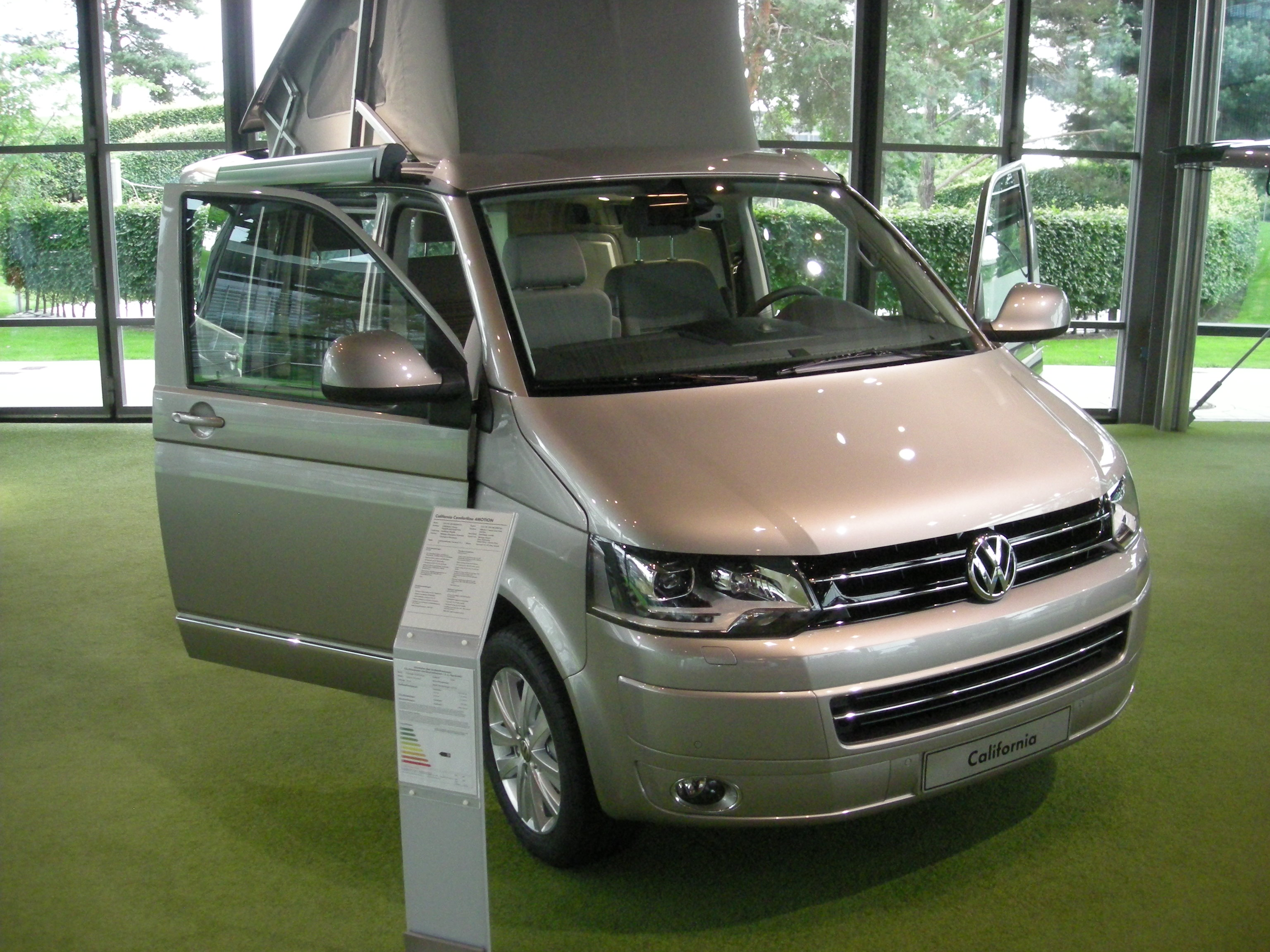
T5 California

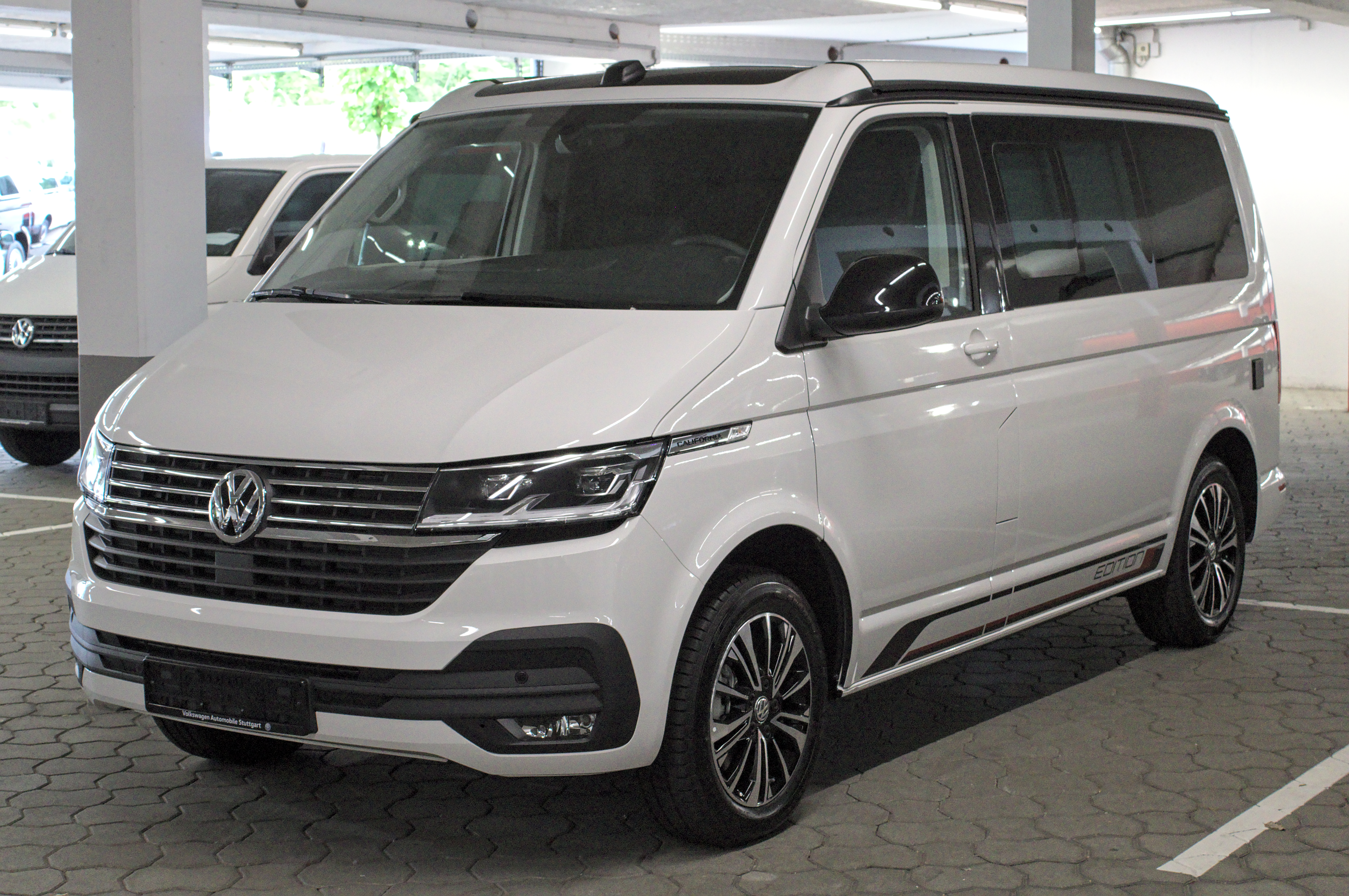
T6 California

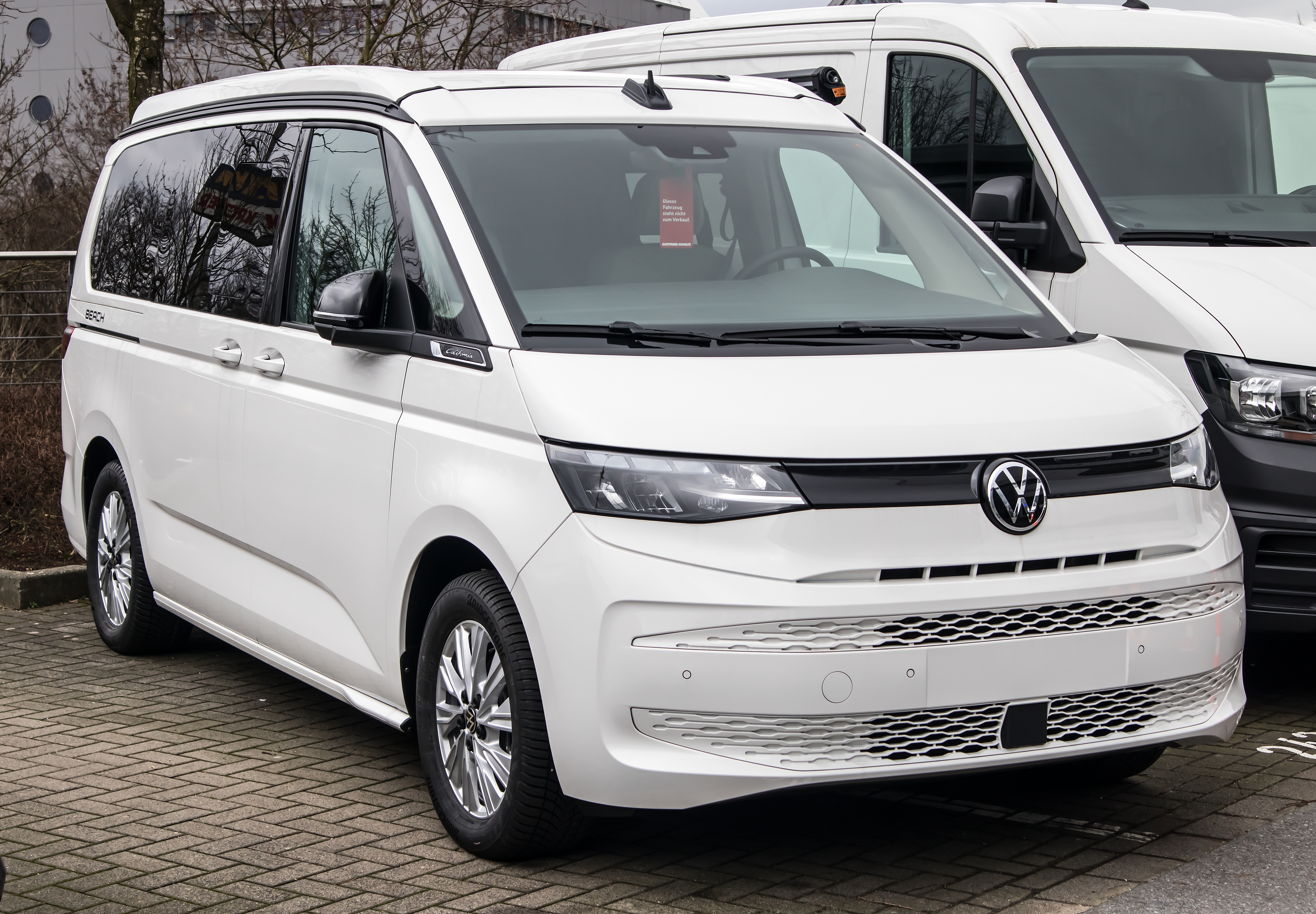
T7 California

=== T5/T5.1 California (Multivan/Kombi) ===
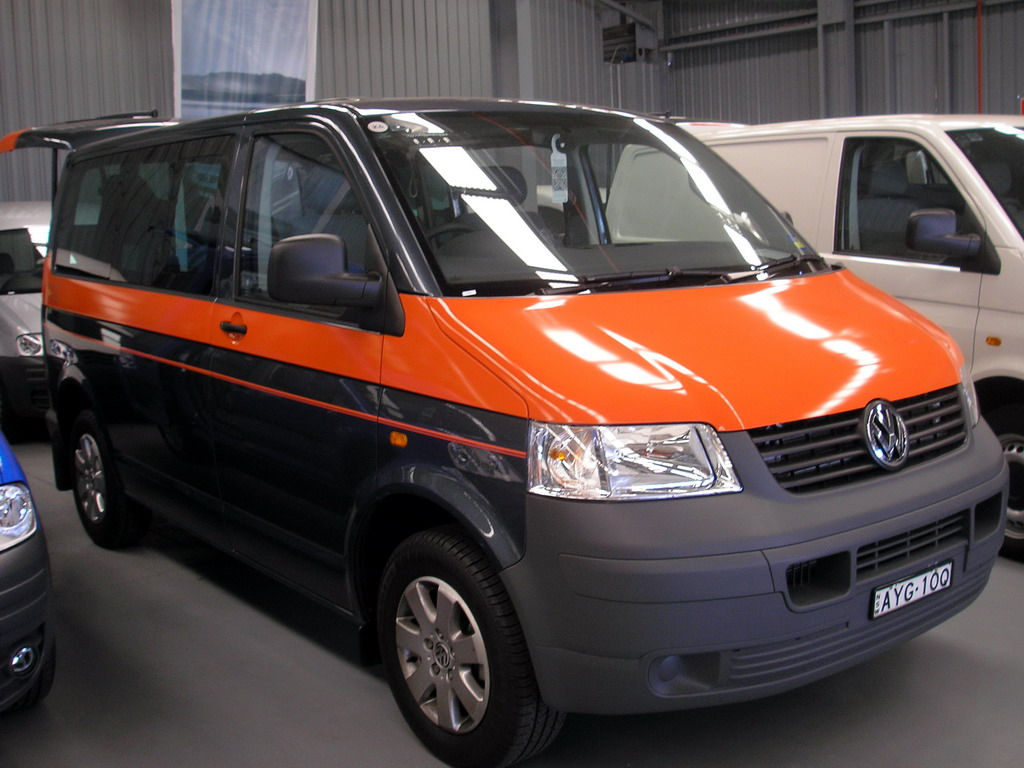
Australian spec Kombi Beach, known as California/Multivan Beach in Germany

- ABS brakes
- Acceleration Slip Regulator (ASR) - a traction control system
- cruise control
- air conditioning
- power front windows
- heated doors and mirrors
- remote central locking
- CD player with 6 speakers
- alloy wheels with full size spare
- dimmable dashboard illumination
- storage nets

==== Bedding ====
The "Good Night Package" comes with curtains, and the ability to fold the seats into a bed for two.

==== Indoor/outdoor features ====
A folding table integrated within the sliding door is able to be used outside and inside with two folding chairs.

Combined with the rear seats, the front seats swivel 180 degrees, so you can have a meeting/meal/break with the rear seat passengers.

==== Other options ====
California Beach now has the option of the elevating "pop top" aluminium roof, with bed space of 120x200cm in Germany.

=== T6/T6.1 California ===
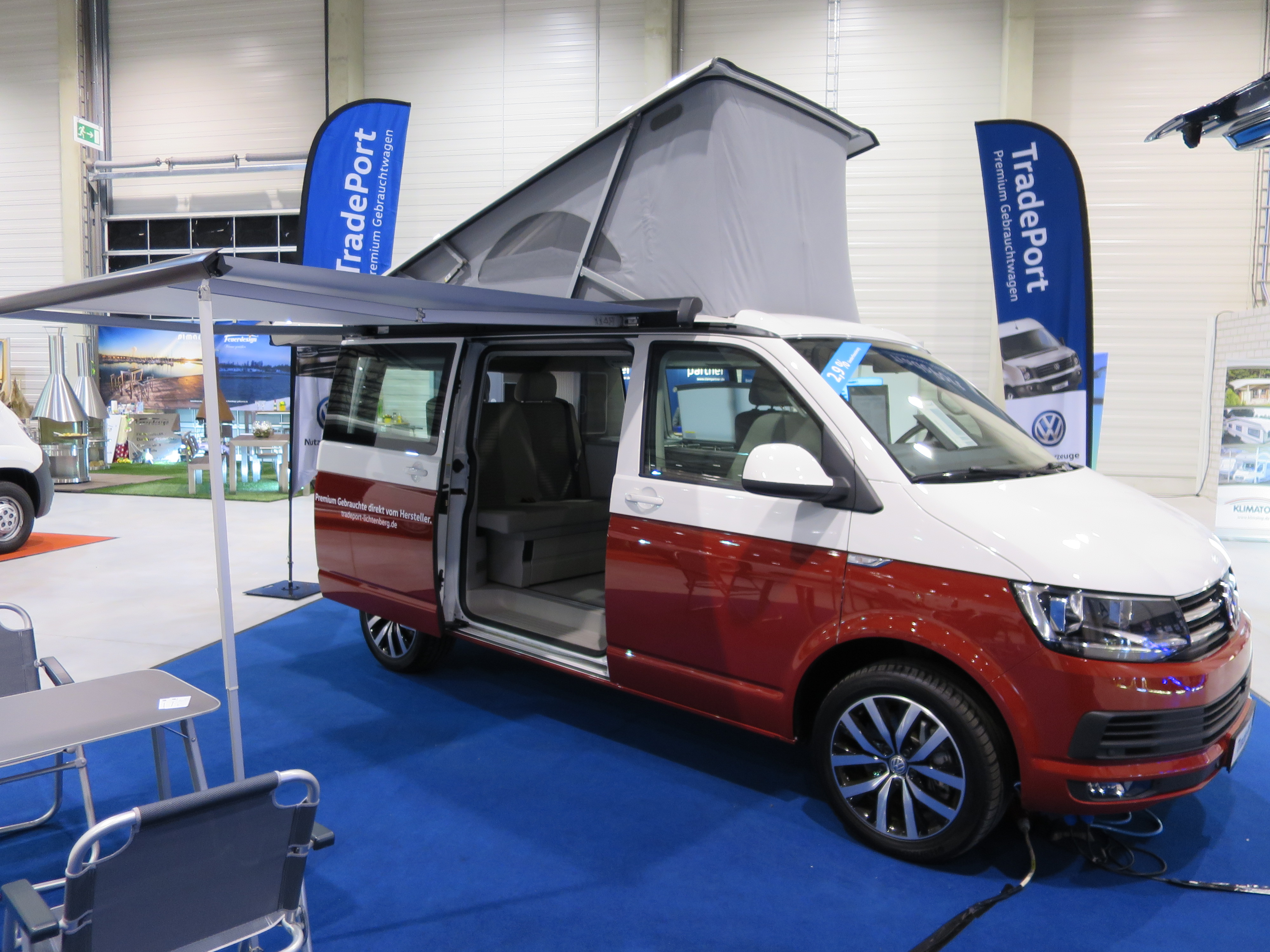
T6 California in Germany (2017 model)

In 2015, following the launch of the T6 Transporter, a new version of the VW California was released to replace the older T5 version. Notable changes to the later models include a re-styled grille as well as re-designed headlamps and wing mirrors. There were three equipment levels in this lineup, including the T6 Ocean, the T6 Coast and the T6 Beach.

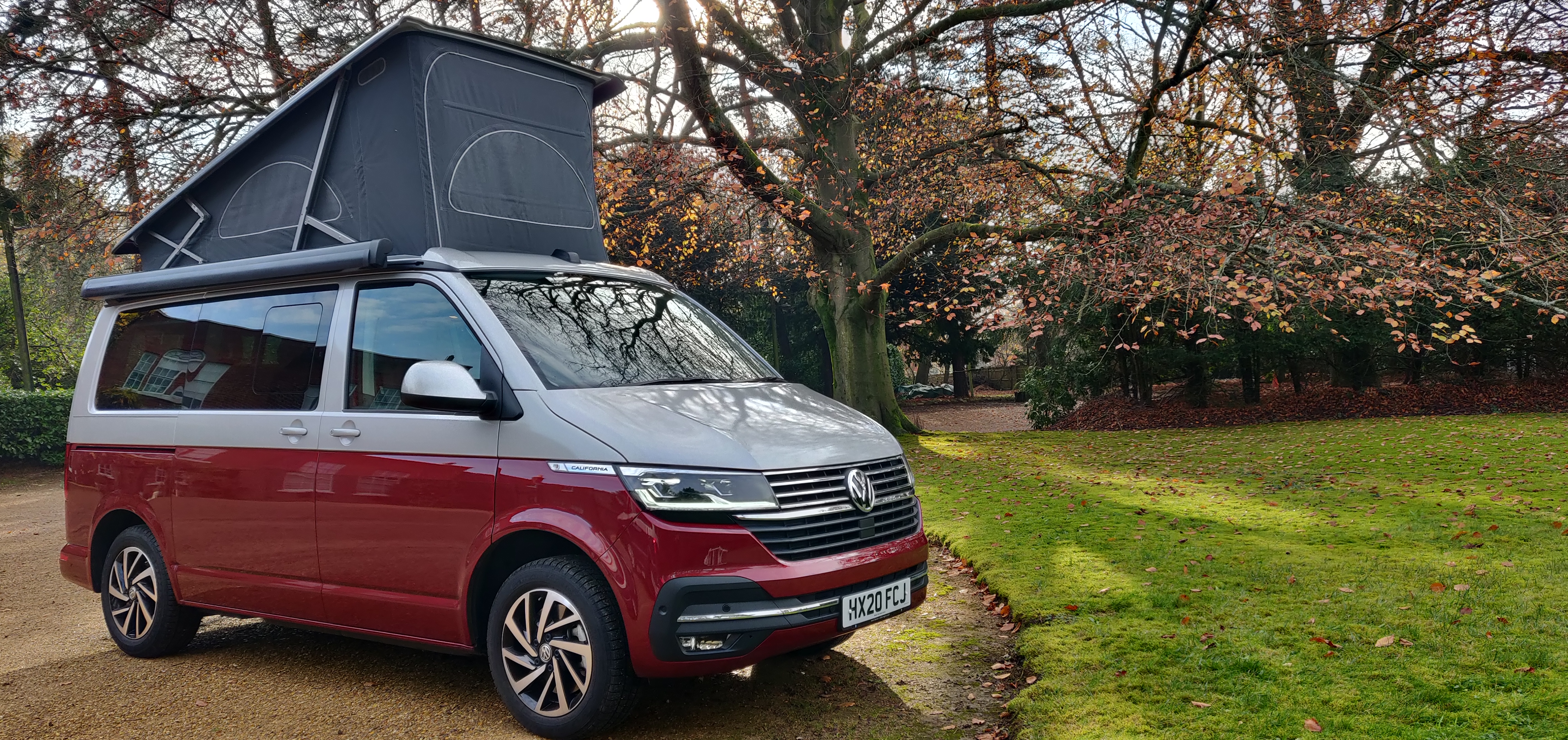
T6.1 California Ocean released September 2019

VW continued to update the VW California and in September 2019 the California T6.1 was released. This featured a restyled front and interior cabinets. The fragile concertina style tambour doors on the previous Ocean & Coast models were replaced with tougher rigid doors. The biggest changes were to the steering, VW completely replaced the system with an electronic fly-by-wire installation, giving a lighter feel and also allowing more driver assistance features such as lane assist and cross-wind assist to be introduced.

==== Bedding ====
The California Ocean comes with an electro-hydraulically elevating aluminium roof with bed space of 200x120cm. The rear seating in the California Ocean can be arranged to make lower level double bed measuring 200x116cm. The Coast and Beach comes with a manual elevating aluminium roof held up on gas struts with the bed being the exact same measurement. Whilst on the Beach as the 5 seater configuration the bottom bed measures 200x120cm. The 4 seater is exact the same but the third seat is replaced with two big chest cupboards (This was made standard on the T6.1 but wasn’t widely available on the T6). The T6.1 Beach also has a tour version which seats up to 7 seater people carrier/Campervan crossover.

==== Kitchen ====
In the Coast and Ocean models the kitchen comprises a sink, a two burner gas cooktop powered by a 2.8 kg gas cylinder, a 42-litre compressor fridge, two kitchen storage cupboards with drawers integrated in the design are also standard. Whereas, in the T6.1 Beach Camper model there is a pull out cooker which has a single burner hob and a small preparation zone. The 6.1 Beach Tour doesn’t come with a kitchen but has sliding doors on both sides.

==== Indoor/outdoor features ====
A standard fitment twin water tanks both hold 30 litres of water, one for drinking water, the other for foul/waste water. There is an optional 250 cm awning which mounts above the sliding door, and a foldaway table is stored in the sliding door and two chairs are hidden in the tailgate hatch.

==== Other options ====
- satellite navigation system
- 3 Zone climatic air conditioner
- Alcantara and leather upholstery
- single seat for living area
- parking sensors for front and rear
- rain sensing wipers
- auto dimming rear view mirror
- headlamp washers
- electric sliding door and tailgate
- privacy glass for rear
- removable towbar
- 2 tone paintwork
- 4motion four-wheel drive system

=== Grand California ===
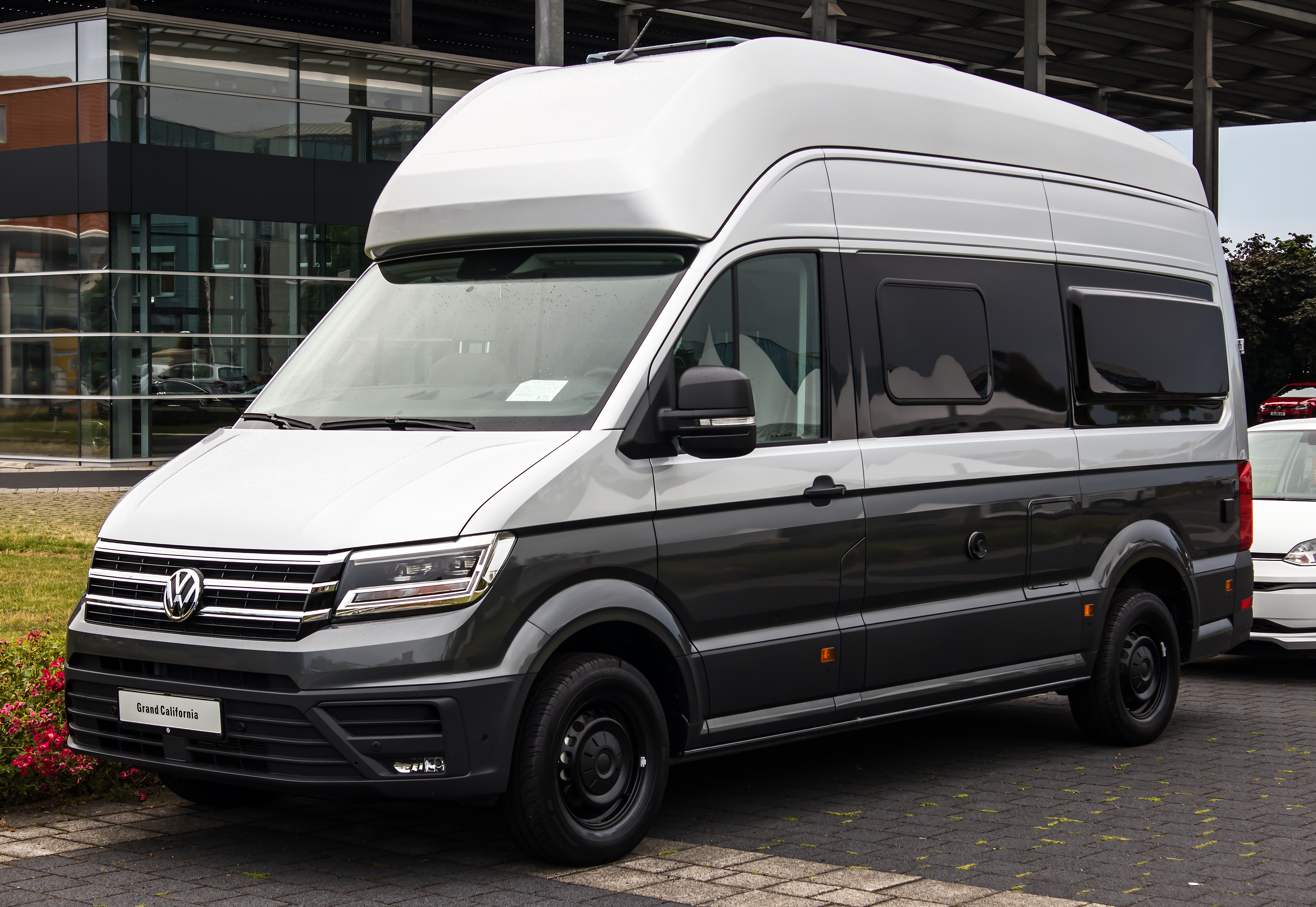
Grand California

The Grand California is based on the Volkswagen Crafter and it comes in two versions, a short wheel base 600 or long wheel base 680, with the van being able to sleep up to four people. However, unlike the standard California, it can only sleep two adults on the bottom bed and the top bed is only big enough for two children therefore making it a family van. Unlike the standard California this van has a built in bathroom which contains a toilet with a disposable tank, a sink which doubles up as the shower, two sided mirror which opens up to create cupboard space and hooks for towels. At the front, the van has two captains chairs and a double bench seat with a dining table to make a living room, a kitchen with two burner hob, sink, pull out fridge drawer, storage cupboards two pull out extra preparation desk including a fold down panel for the outside where two USB ports and a socket are housed for outdoor use. In the rear of the van on the rear doors there are two compartments where the outdoor table and chairs are stored, the rear bed also on both side has two cupboards, as well as the shower in the bathroom it comes with an outdoor shower. An awning is optional unlike the standard California. The Grand California comes with the same engines that you can option on the crafter van, the blinds and fly screens are available on all of the rear windows, but the front windows come with magnetic blinds.

=== Caddy California ===
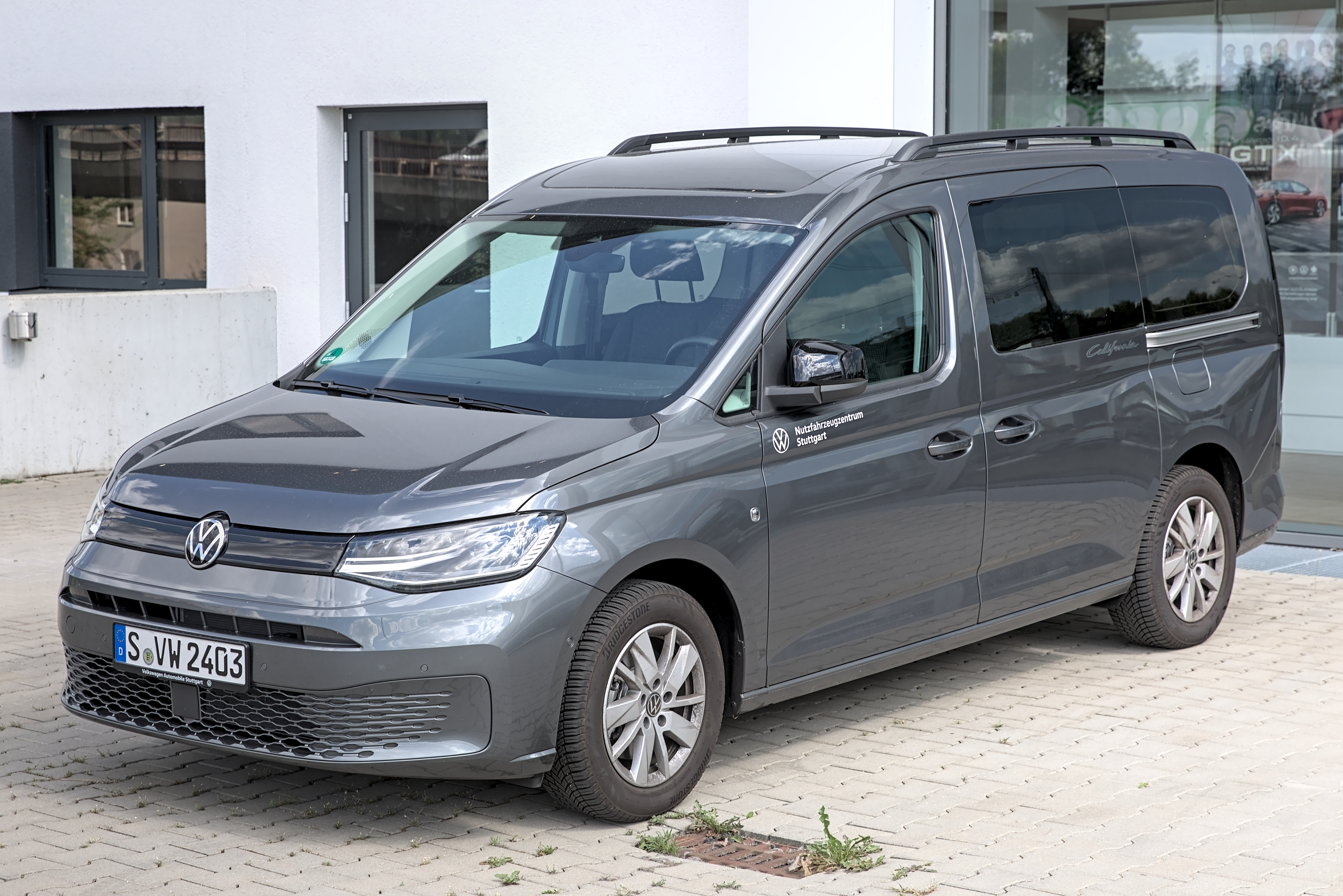
Caddy California Maxi

The Caddy California is the new smaller version for the California collection. The Caddy California is based on the new Caddy V van. The Caddy comes as either a short wheel base (SWB) or Maxi (LWB) with seats for five belted passengers.

In the main cabin of the van, there are two individual front seats and a rear bench with three seats. A bed frame and mattress is stowed behind the second row, serving as a rear package shelf when folded. To transform the van for sleeping, the rear bench and front seats are folded forward, then the bed frame and mattress is unfurled and pulled over the rear seat, where it is clamped down to form a double bed which measures 198 cm × 107 cm (78 in × 42 in). As an option, a free-standing tent can be ordered which attaches to the boot and provides sleeping space for another two people.

A slide-out kitchenette is provided as standard equipment for all models. It deploys from the rear of the vehicle when the tailgate is open. In the boot the kitchen is situated inside a wooden cabinet with two drawers on it. In the top drawer, there is a single burner hob with a small preparation zone. Next to the kitchen, there is a zip up cabinet where two camping chairs and table are stored folded. All the blinds are magnetic and stick to all the windows. The rear window blinds are two storage bags with two zipped compartments each. Another option is to have a long glass sunroof fitted.

=== T7, Multivan, and ID. Buzz California ===
In December 2021, Volkswagen announced that its next variant will be an all electric California campervan which will be based on the new all electric Volkswagen ID. Buzz which will be on the long wheelbase (LWB) vehicle only. The Multivan was originally optioned in 2021, but VW weren’t fully convinced at first but now the Multivan will be launched as a California camper variant.

In 2025, Volkswagen will launch two new versions of the California, one of which has already been launched. The first is the new T7, which is being sold as the Multivan in Europe after its initial debut in mid-2021. The California Multivan was launched in 2024 with plug-in hybrid, diesel, and gasoline options, only LWB. The upcoming ID. California will be based on the new all-electric people carrier inspired by the original T1 minivan, called the ID. Buzz. The ID. Buzz California will only be offered as a long-wheelbase (LWB) vehicle. Finally, the separate T7 Transporter van will not get a California variant because Volkswagen announced that the California is a premium camper brand, though the exact design variants for the upcoming electric ID. California are not yet fully revealed.
