= USS California =

USS California may refer to:

- USS California (1867) was a screw sloop originally named Minnetonka
- USS California (ACR-6) was a Pennsylvania-class cruiser commissioned in 1907, renamed San Diego in 1914 and sunk by a mine in World War I
- USS California (SP-249) served during World War I as a motor patrol boat in New York City Harbor; later renamed Hauoli
- USS California (SP-647) was a motor patrol boat in San Francisco Harbor during World War I.
- USS California (BB-44) was a Tennessee-class battleship active in World War II
- USS California (CGN-36) was the lead ship of her class of nuclear-powered guided missile cruisers; known as the "Golden Grizzly."
- USS California (SSN-781) is a Virginia-class submarine commissioned in 2011

== See also ==
- USS Californian (1900)
- SS California
