= Cochlear Bone Anchored Solutions =

Swedish hearing aid manufacturer

- Industry: Medical devices
- Founded: 1999
- Products: Bone anchored hearing aids
- Parent: Cochlear Limited
- Website: www.cochlear.com

Cochlear Bone Anchored Solutions is a company based in Gothenburg, Sweden that manufactures and distributes bone conduction hearing solutions under the trademark Baha. The company was founded in 1999 under the name Entific Medical Systems. When Cochlear bought the company in 2005, the name was changed to Cochlear Bone Anchored Solutions. The acronym "BAHA" (for bone anchored hearing aid) was trademarked into Baha, as it is not considered a hearing aid by insurance companies.

== Baha system ==
The Baha system is a bone conduction hearing system designed, developed and marketed by Cochlear Bone Anchored Solutions.

It is a semi-implantable, under the skin bone conduction hearing device coupled to the skull by a titanium fixture. The system transfers sound to the inner ear through the bone.

Over 100,000 people have had the system implanted.

== History ==
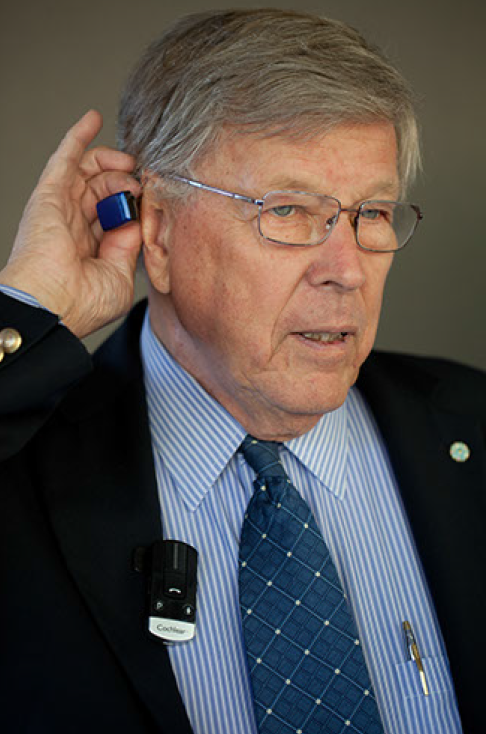
Dr Anders Tjellström, the founder of Baha, testing the Cochlear Baha wireless accessories

Professor Per-Ingvar Brånemark discovered osseointegration in the 1950s, which allows titanium implants to fuse with human bone. The discovery led to wide use in dental implants. In the mid-1970s, Brånemark, together with his ENT colleague Dr Anders Tjellström, glued an Oticon bone vibrator to a snap coupling fitted to a dental implant and then connected it to an audiometer. The patient reported a very high, clear sound, suggesting that the sound propagated through the bones of the maxilla to the inner ear.

Doctors Anders Tjellström at Sahlgrenska University Hospital in Gothenburg, Sweden, implanted and fitted the first patient with a Baha sound processor in 1977.
