= Spanish language in California =

Second-most spoken language in California

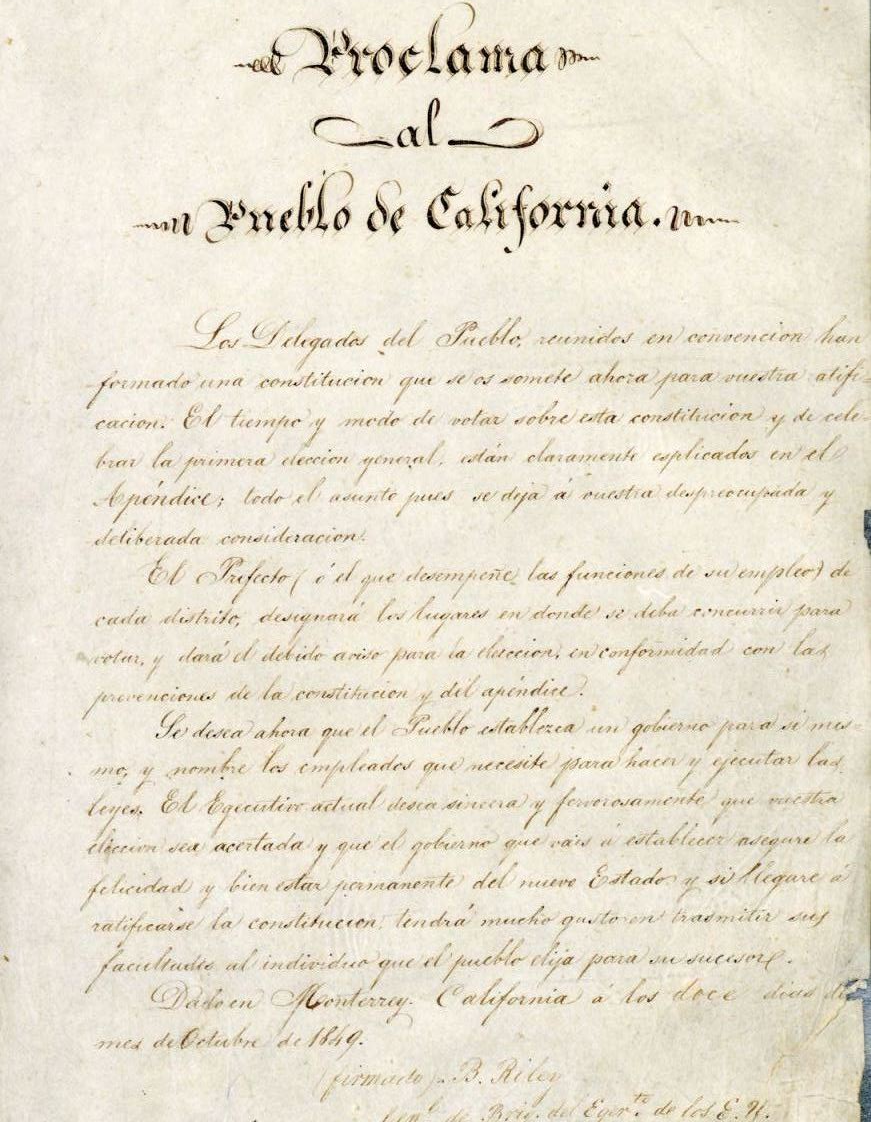
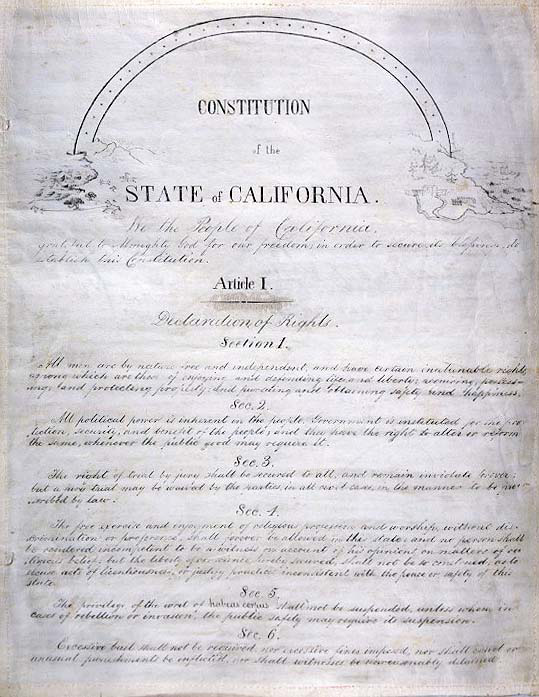
The Constitution of California was written in both Spanish (left) and English (right) in 1849.

The Spanish language is the second-most commonly spoken language in California (after the English language), spoken by 28.18 percent (10,434,308) of the population in 2021. Californian Spanish (español californiano) is a set of varieties of Spanish spoken in California, including the historical variety known as Californio Spanish (español californio).

Spanish was first introduced to California in 1542 and has since become deeply entwined with California's cultural landscape and history. Spanish was the official administrative language in California through the Spanish and Mexican periods until 1848, when Alta California was ceded from Mexico to the United States following the U.S. Conquest of California. Early American governments in California protected the rights of Spanish speakers in the 1849 Constitution of California, but those constitutional protections were removed in 1879.

== Demographics ==
As of 2010, 28.46% (9,696,638) of California residents age 5 and older spoke Spanish at home as a primary language. California has the second highest concentration of Spanish speakers in the United States. Hispanic students are the largest student demographic in public schools in California, making up the majority of student populations in nearly 40% of school districts. 21% of school students in California speak Spanish as their primary language.

Hispanic Californians make up the largest demographic group in California, accounting for nearly 40% of the population, or approximately 15,574,882 people.

== History ==
=== Spanish era ===
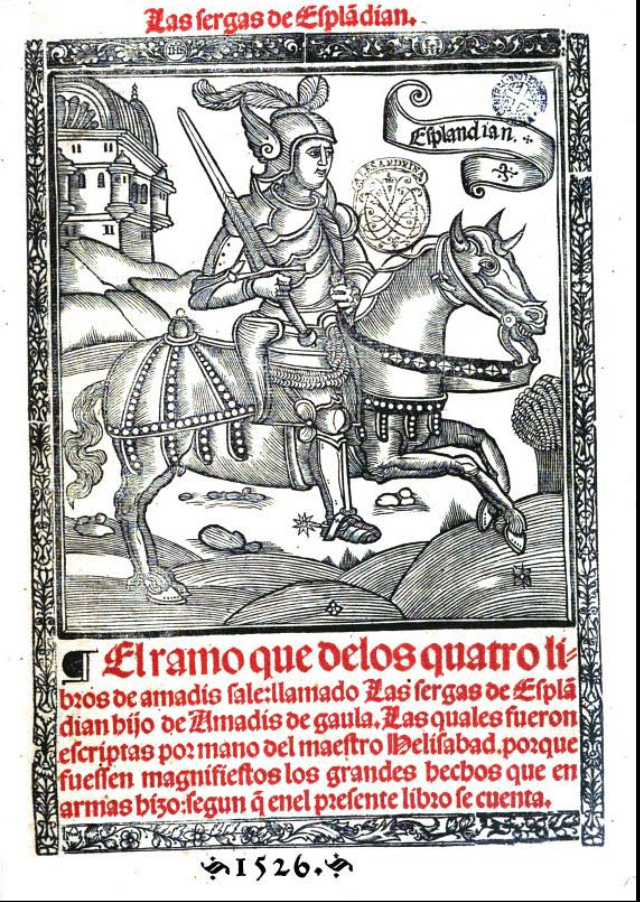
The name of California and its ruler Queen Calafia originate in Las Sergas de Esplandián, a Spanish chivalric epic written by Garci Rodríguez de Montalvo (1510).

The name of California has its origin in the Spanish epic Las sergas de Esplandián ("The Adventures of Esplandián"), written by Garci Rodríguez de Montalvo in the late 15th and early 16th centuries. In Las sergas de Esplandián, California is described as being an island kingdom of warrior women ruled by a queen known as Califia. The name was applied to the modern region of the Californias in the 1530s, initially just referring to Baja California (which is today part of Mexico), but later expanded to cover Alta California (today's U.S. state of California).

The spoken history of the Spanish language in California began in 1542, when the first expeditions of the Spanish Empire came to Alta California. While Spanish expeditions continued throughout the 16th and 17th centuries, permanent Spanish colonization was only solidified following the Portolá expedition in 1769–70, which ultimately led to the founding of Spanish settlements across California, such as Los Angeles, San Francisco, and San Diego. Expedition leader Gaspar de Portolá published his account of the voyage in Estracto de Noticias del Puerto de Monterrey, as did Spanish cartographer Miguel Costansó in his Diario Histórico de los Viages de Mar, y Tierra Hechos al Norte de la California, both published in 1770.

The creation of the Spanish missions in California led to the spread of the Spanish language into the lives of the Indigenous peoples of California which resided in the mission system. Franciscan missionaries served an important role in the proliferation of Spanish across communities in California, both through missionary-run education and through publishings of Franciscan padres, such as Francisco Palóu, who wrote various histories and essays on California, including his seminal Noticias de la Nueva California, written from 1767 to 1784.

=== Mexican era ===
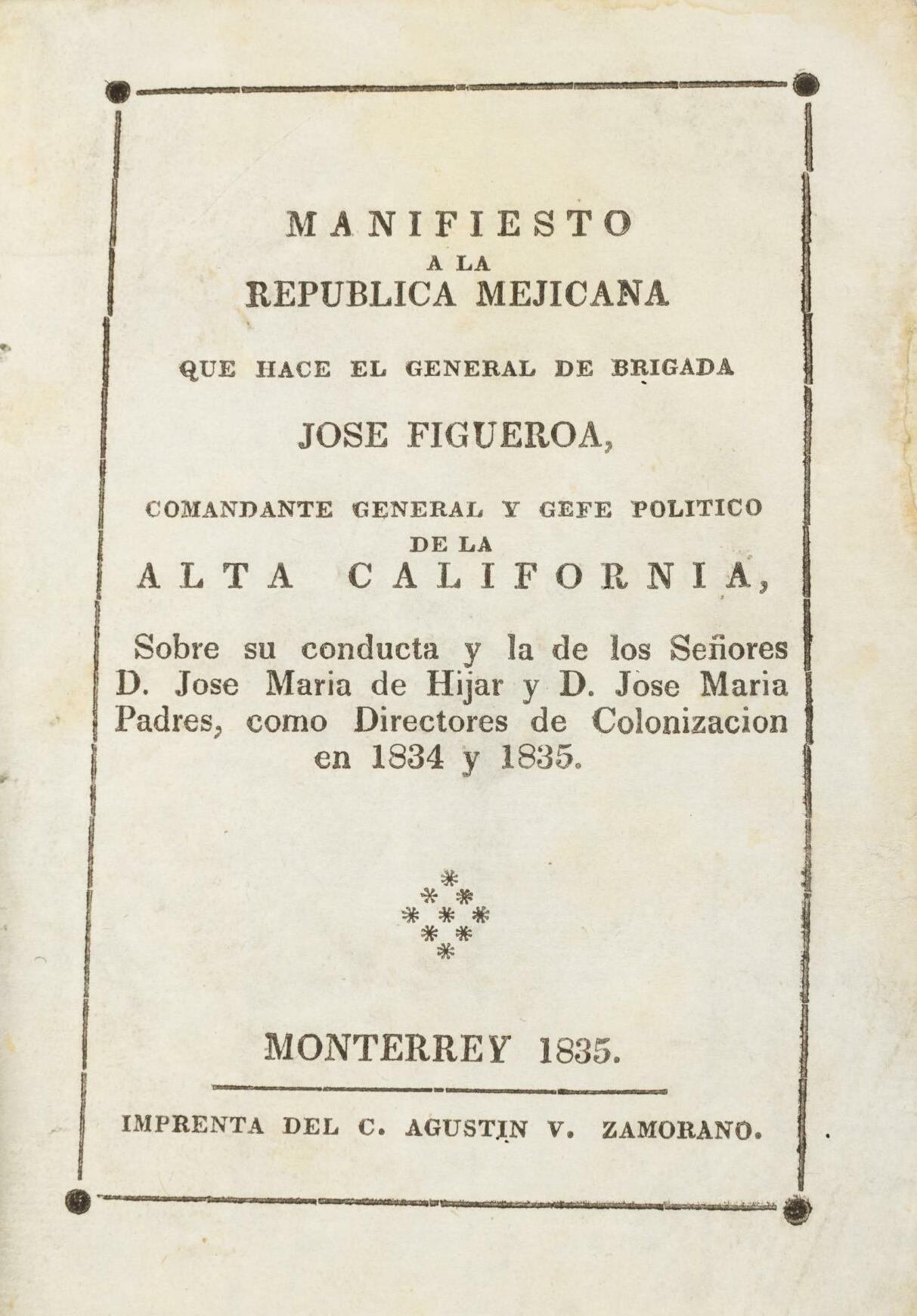
The first book published in California: "Manifesto a la República Mejicana" by José Figueroa (1835).

In 1834, Agustín V. Zamorano became the first publisher in the history of California, opening a print shop in Monterey, mainly serving as the official press of the Mexican government in California. In 1835, Zamorano published the first book in the history of California, "Manifesto a la República Mejicana", written by Governor José Figueroa.

Previous literary pieces had been written in California, but had to be published elsewhere, such as Carlos Antonio Carrillo's 1831 "Exposición dirigida á la Cámara de Diputados del Congreso de la Unión". During the Mexican era, a number of the American and European immigrants settled in Alta California and acquired Mexican citizenship, in order to own land, often under the requirement that they learn to speak Spanish.

=== Early American era ===
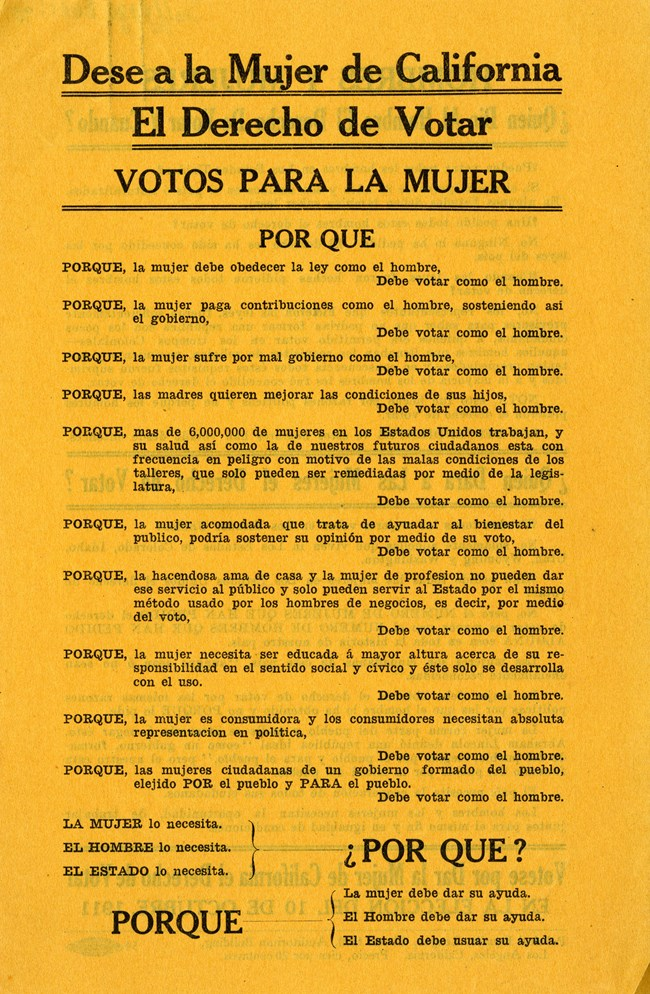
Californian women's suffrage pamphlet written by María de López (1911)

Following the U.S. Conquest of California in 1847, the rights of Spanish speakers were initially guaranteed by the American interim government of California. The first Constitution of California, written in 1849 in both English and Spanish, guaranteed the official status of Spanish alongside English in government regulations and publications. One of the first acts of the first California Legislature of 1850 was to appoint a State Translator, who would be responsible for translating all state laws, decrees, documents, and orders into Spanish.

While Spanish initially continued to be used in schools and government following the Mexican Cession in 1848, the Anglophone American settlers migrating en masse to California during the California Gold Rush would eventually establish their language, culture, and law as dominant, displacing Spanish in the public sphere. By 1855, California declared that English would be the only medium of instruction in its schools, as a way of ensuring the social and political dominance of Anglos.

By the time California's second constitutional convention was convened in 1872, judicial proceedings in Hispanic majority areas of California were carried out in Spanish, and those areas had justices of the peace appointed who only spoke Spanish. The 1872 constitutional convention had no Spanish-speaking participants (compared to a significant portion of the 1849 convention) and ultimately voted 46–39 to revise the earlier clause so that all official proceedings would henceforth be published only in English.

Coinciding with the 1872 constitution's ratification and the rise of the nativist Workingmen's Party of California, Hispanic children throughout California started to be segregated into separate educational facilities known as "Mexican schools". Despite the displacement of Spanish from the public sphere, most of California continued to be home to Spanish-speaking communities through the 19th and 20th centuries into the modern day.

== Legal status ==
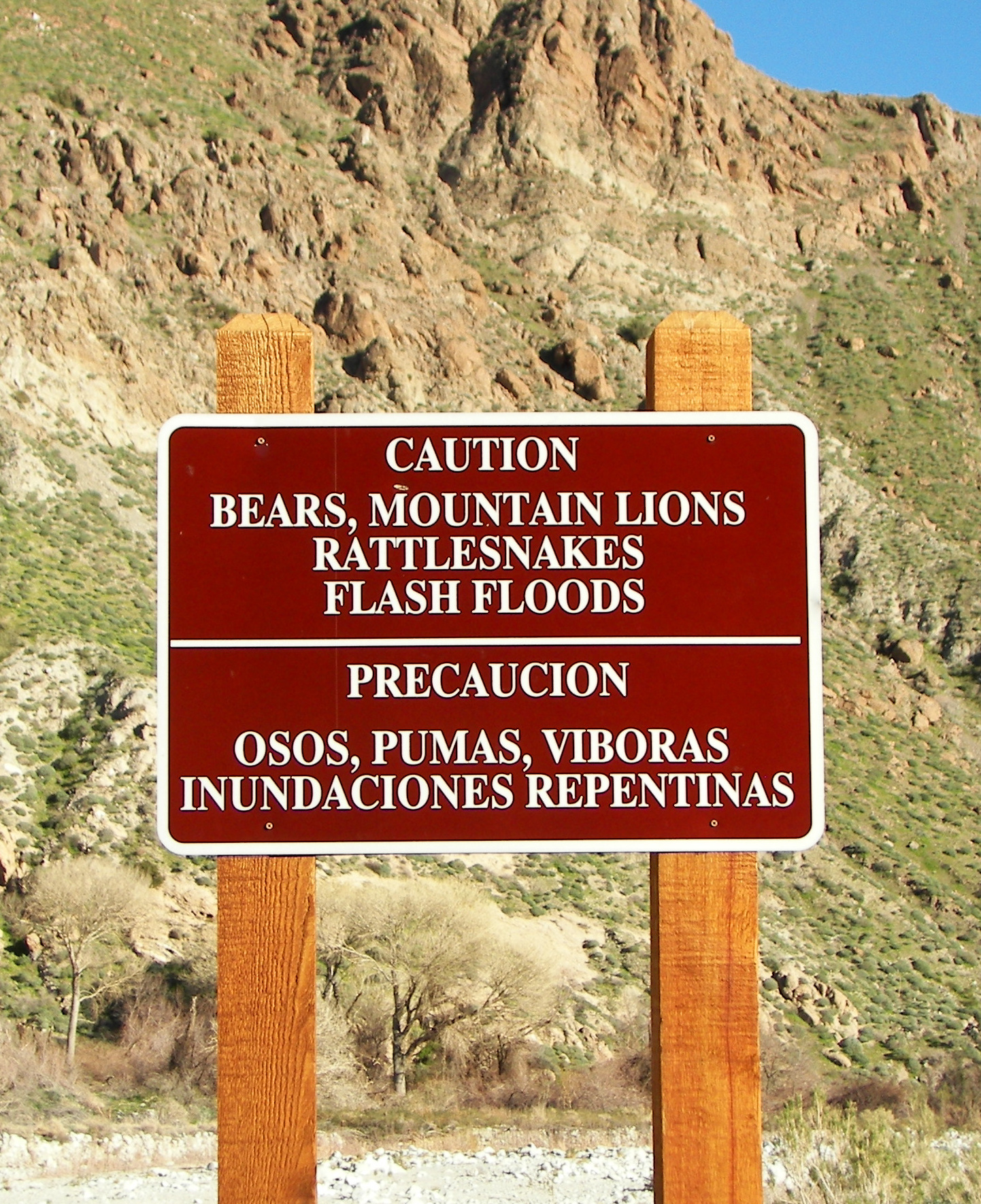
Bilingual sign where English and Spanish are displayed equally in size and font; the Colorado Desert in Southern California.

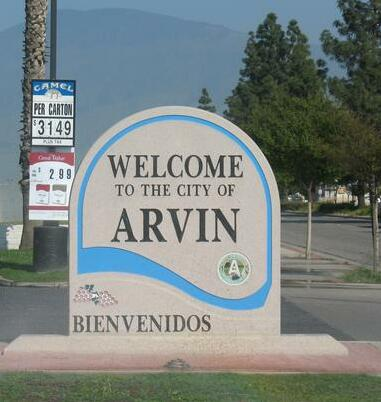
Bilingual sign where English is displayed more prominently than Spanish, in the San Joaquin Valley

Spanish was the official administrative language of California through the Spanish and Mexican eras, until 1848. Following the U.S. Conquest of California and the Treaty of Guadalupe-Hidalgo, the U.S. Government initially guaranteed the rights of the Spanish-speaking citizens in the Mexican Cession.

The first Constitution of California (1849) was written in both English and Spanish at the Monterey Constitutional Convention of 1849 and it enshrined the constitutional rights of Spanish speakers to use their language in government proceedings and mandated that all government documents be published in both English and Spanish.

All laws, decrees, regulations, and provisions emanating from any of the three supreme powers of this State, which from their nature require publication, shall be published in English and Spanish.

— Constitution of California, 1849, Art. XI Sec. 21.

By 1870, the English-speaking American population had become the majority in California. The revised 1879 constitution stripped the rights of Spanish speakers and the official status of Spanish. Under the new constitution, all official proceedings were to be conducted exclusively in English, a clause that remained in effect until 1966.

The growth of the English-only movement in the 20th century led to the passage of 1986 California Proposition 63, which constitutionally enshrined English as the only official language in California and ended Spanish language instruction in schools.

English is the official language of the State of California.

— Constitution of California, Art. 3, Sec. 6

The government of California has made efforts to expand its Spanish language capacity across a variety of agencies. Spanish is widely spoken through the state and many local governments and special districts offer services and publications in both English and Spanish.

The Judiciary of California provides live Spanish language interpretation in all 52 counties of California, across the Superior Courts of California and the California Courts of Appeal, as well as the Supreme Court of California.

=== Local governments ===
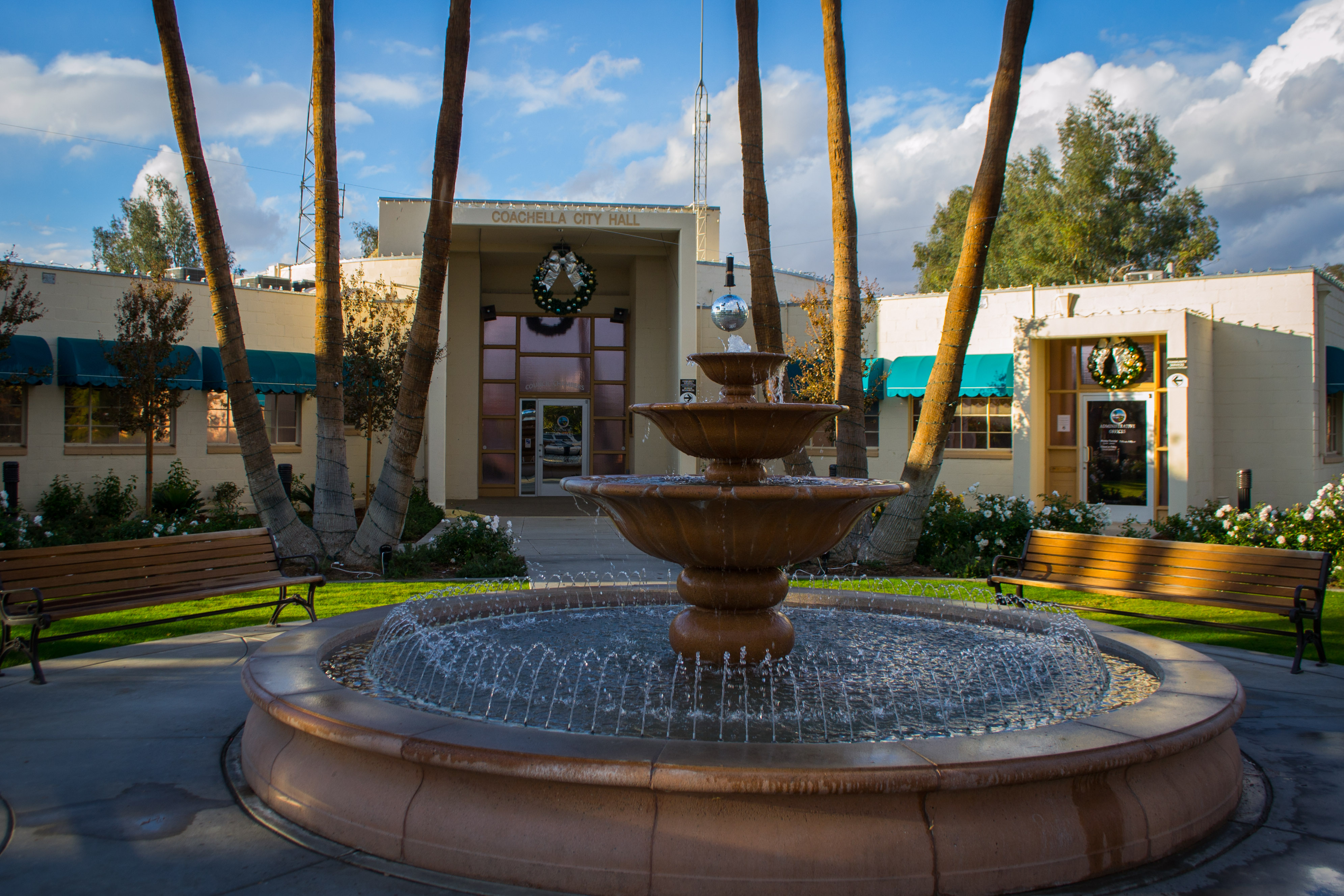
Coachella is an example of a city government that is officially bilingual in English and Spanish.

The redistricting processes of 225 (out of 482) cities in California are required to be conducted in both English and Spanish.

The city of Coachella is officially bilingual in English and Spanish, both in government publications and city council proceedings, with 90% of residents speaking Spanish. The city of Calexico is exploring becoming officially bilingual in English and Spanish.

The city of San Francisco recognizes Spanish as one of its official languages, alongside English, Chinese, Filipino, and Vietnamese.

The city of Los Angeles mandates that all Los Angeles City Council meetings be served by a Spanish language interpreter. LA council members regularly hold bilingual English/Spanish press conferences and often participate in Spanish language immersion courses in order to communicate directly with the high number of Spanish-speaking constituents. The Los Angeles Department of Transportation (LADOT) requires that "high quality and inclusive community engagement must be conducted in English and Spanish", while the LA Department of City Planning requires all city planning materials to be published in both English and Spanish.

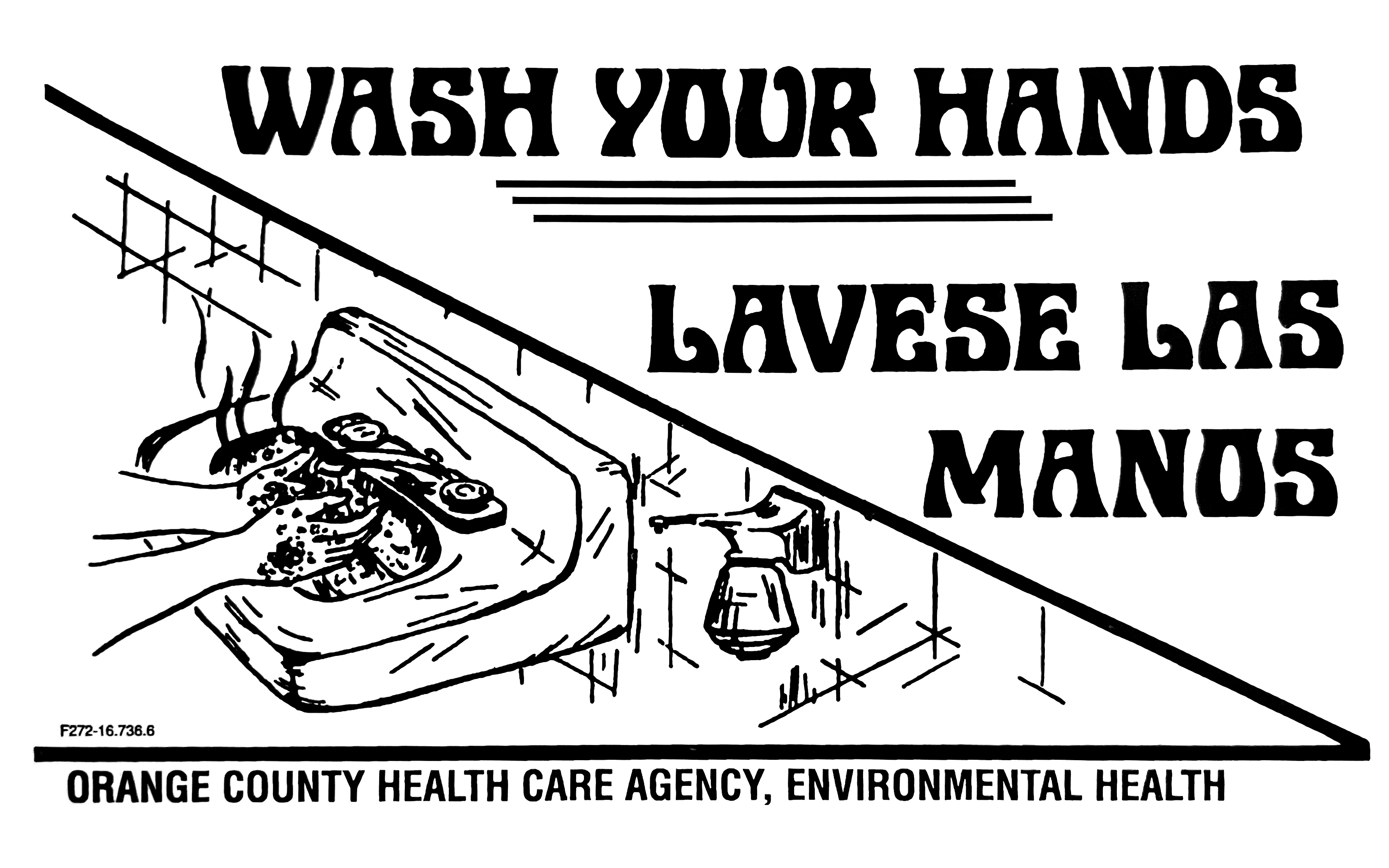
Bilingual English/Spanish Orange County public health notice

The cities of San Jose, Santa Ana, San Bernardino, Long Beach, Chula Vista, Ventura, Santa Maria, Merced, Santa Barbara, San Juan Capistrano, Modesto, Santa Monica, Santa Rosa, Fontana, and Los Angeles mandate live Spanish-language interpretation at all city council sessions. Efforts have been made to mandate live Spanish interpretation in government proceedings in Sacramento and Anaheim. Other cities provide Spanish language interpretation services at city council meetings only upon request, such as Fresno and Murrieta. Some cities have announced mandates for live Spanish language interpretation at all public meetings, but have failed to fulfill these mandates, such as Stockton.

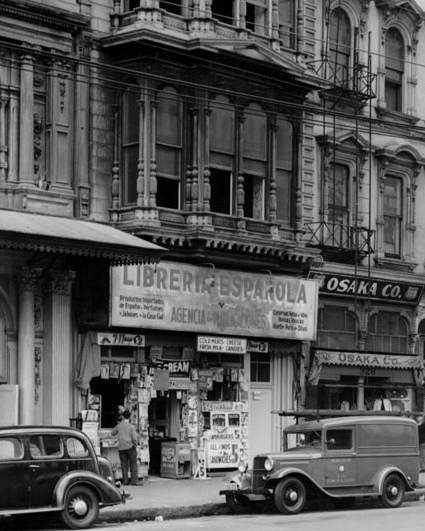
Librería Española, a historic Spanish language bookstore in Downtown L.A. in the 1930s

Orange County, Santa Barbara County, and San Diego County mandate that all public health notices, county board of supervisor meeting agendas, and emergency information be provided in Spanish. Santa Clara County, San Mateo County, Alameda County, Fresno County, San Benito County, and the consolidated City and County of San Francisco all provide Spanish language interpretation services at meetings of their respective county boards of supervisors upon request. Efforts have been made to mandate live Spanish interpretation in government proceedings in Imperial County.

The San Diego Association of Governments (SANDAG) mandates all public meetings must be staffed with bilingual English/Spanish staff, including English/Spanish court reporters, interpreters, and publications. SANDAG also mandates all regional surveys be conducted in both English and Spanish.

=== Police and public safety ===
The California Commission on Peace Officer Standards and Training has set standards for all law enforcement officers in California to meet a minimum fluency level in Spanish.

The San Diego County Sheriff operates the only Spanish-language police academy in California, known as the Academia del Agualcil (Spanish for "Sheriff's Academy").

Certified bilingual Spanish/English police officers are maintained by San Francisco PD, Santa Rosa PD, and the Sonoma County Sheriff's Department.

== Spanish language media ==
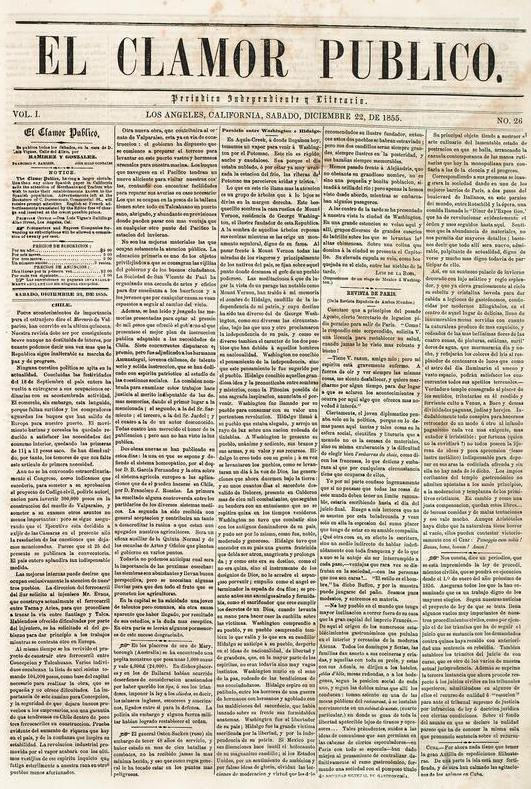
El Clamor Público was a Spanish language newspaper founded in 1855.

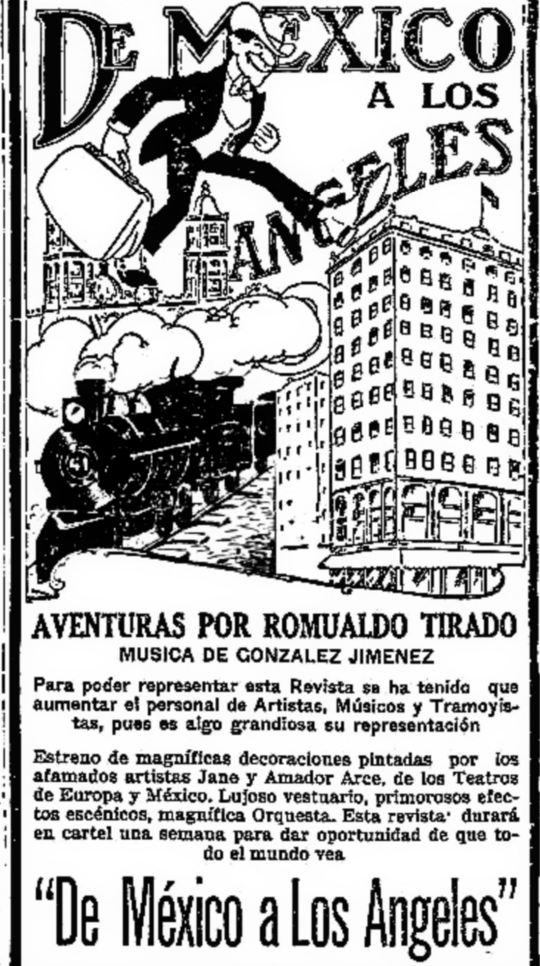
Romualdo Tirado's De México a Los Ángeles (1929), performed at the Teatro México in Los Angeles

Since the COVID-19 pandemic, Spanish language media has faced a crisis in California, with many local newspapers and radio stations closing and owners of Spanish newspapers shifting their resources towards English publications.

=== News ===
La Opinión, based in Los Angeles, is the largest Spanish-language news publication in the United States.

Most major English-language newspapers in California offer Spanish-language editions, such as the San Diego Union-Tribune en Español and the Los Angeles Times en Español. The San Francisco Chronicle does not publish a dedicated Spanish-language edition, but does publish select articles in Spanish, as does its sister publication SFGATE.

The San Jose Mercury News had published a Spanish-language edition from 1998 until 2005. The San José Spotlight maintains a Spanish language edition.

In 2014, The Orange County Register launched a Spanish language newspaper, Unidos en el Sur de California. In 2015, the Roman Catholic Diocese of Orange launched a Spanish language newspaper.

History

The Los Angeles Star/Estrella de Los Ángeles was the first newspaper in Southern California, publishing in Los Angeles in both Spanish and English, from 1851 to 1879. El Clamor Público was another Spanish language newspaper published out of Los Angeles from 1855 to 1859. La Sociedad was based in San Francisco, published in Spanish from 1869 to 1895.

In some cases, 19th century Mexican newspapers, such as La Orquesta, published Californian editions alongside their primary Mexican editions.

During the Chicano movement, from the 1940s to the 1970s, activist-oriented Chicano publications popped up around California, particularly in large cities and on college campuses, such as El Malcriado and La Raza, as well as Chicana feminist papers like Hijas de Cuauhtémoc.

=== Television ===
Estrella TV, owned by Estrella Media, is a major Spanish language television broadcast network, based in Burbank, California. LATV is a minor Spanish-English bilingual broadcast network, based in Los Angeles.

Telemundo and Univision, the two largest Spanish news broadcasters in the United States, maintain local affiliates across California.

== Spanish bilingual education ==
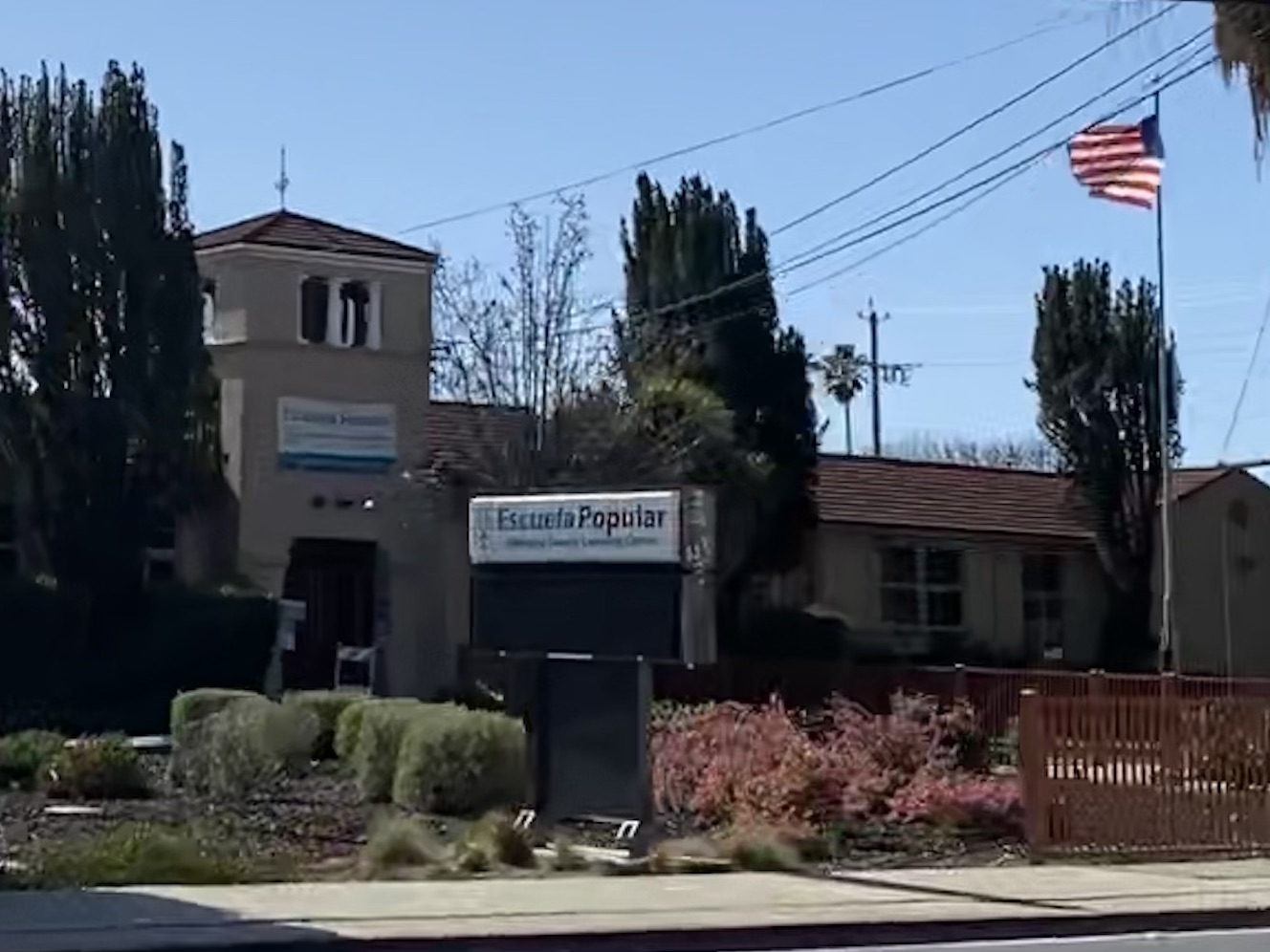
Escuela Popular, a Spanish-English dual immersion school in San Jose, established in 1986

2016 California Proposition 58 reversed the prohibition on bilingual education, but many barriers to the proliferation of Spanish bilingual education still exist, including a shortage of teachers and lack of funding. The government of California has since made efforts to promote Spanish language access and bilingual education, as have private educational institutions in California.

LéaLA — La Feria del Libro en Español y Festival Literario de Los Ángeles — is an annual Spanish language book fair, held at LA Plaza de Cultura y Artes in Los Angeles.

=== Primary and secondary education ===
A signification number of school districts in California operate Spanish-English dual immersion schools, including Santa Ana USD, San José USD, San Francisco USD, San Gabriel USD, San Diego USD, San Bernardino City USD, Los Angeles USD, Pasadena USD, San Luis Obispo Coastal USD, Capistrano USD, Salinas City ESD, San Leandro USD, and Santa Monica-Malibu USD.

=== Higher education ===
The Los Angeles Community College District operates select college programs with Spanish-language instruction.

== Spanish language arts and literature ==
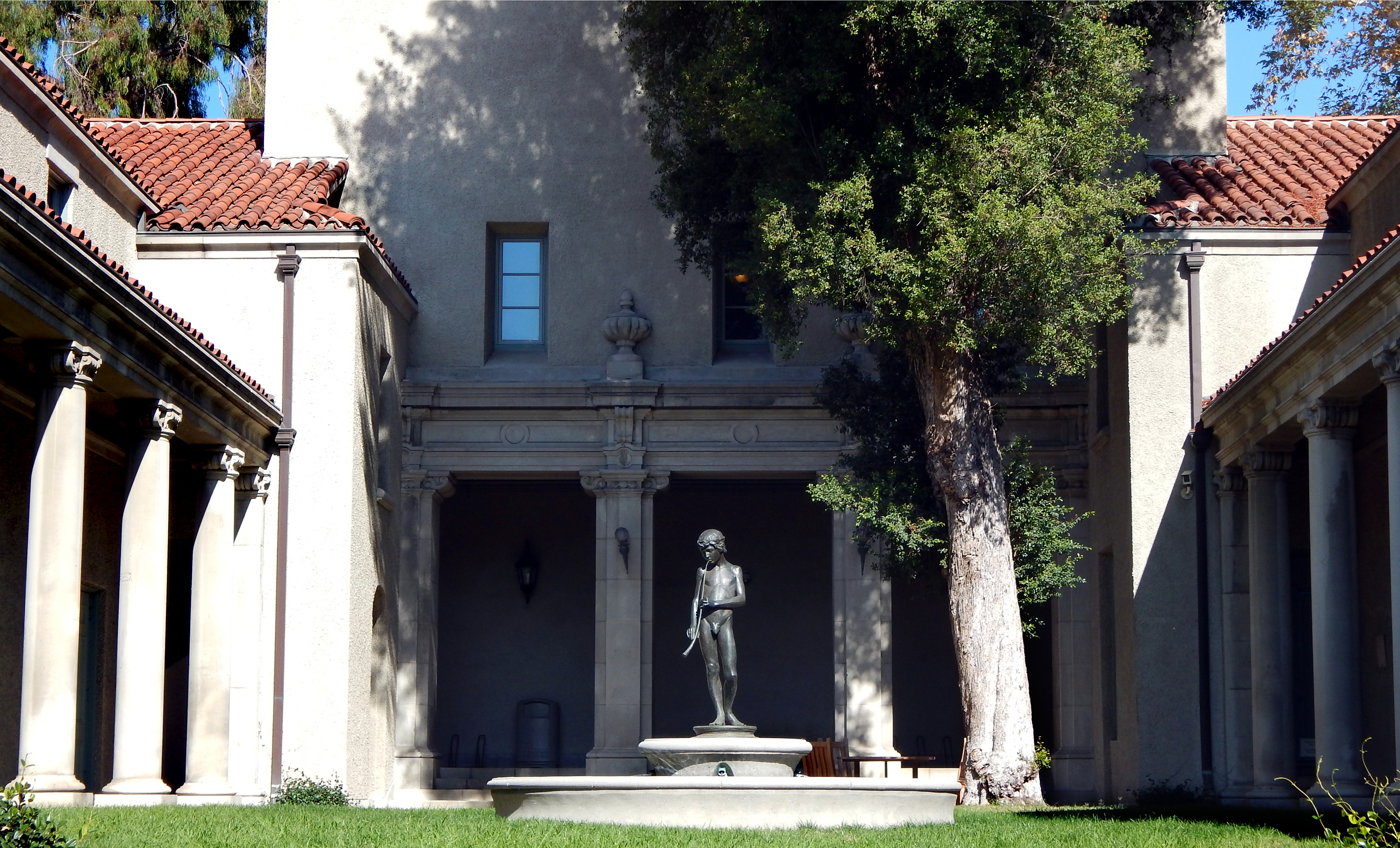
The Spirit of Spanish Music, a monument to Spanish language musical traditions at Pomona College

Contemporary Californian authors that write in the Spanish language include Juan Felipe Herrera, Javier O. Huerta, Richard Rodriguez, Francisco Jiménez, Aurora Guerrero, Francisco Aragón, Alex Espinoza, Stephen D. Gutiérrez, Reyna Grande, Rubén Martínez, Ivan Argüelles, and Daniel Chacón.

=== Theatre ===
El Teatro Campesino is a historic Chicano theatre company based in San Juan Bautista, California, performing in both Spanish and English.

== Usage in business ==
Many businesses in California promote the usage of Spanish by their employees, to better serve both California's Hispanic population and the larger Spanish-speaking world. California has legal protections against Spanish language discrimination in the workplace.

== Linguistic features ==
Californian Spanish has a wide variety of linguistic intonations. It is noted for the prevalence of code-switching and its notable influence from English loanwords, known as anglicisms.

The Spanish of Southern California exhibits morphosyntactic traits that are characterized by Spanish morphological structures that are applied to borrowed words and syntactic structures.

=== Dialects ===
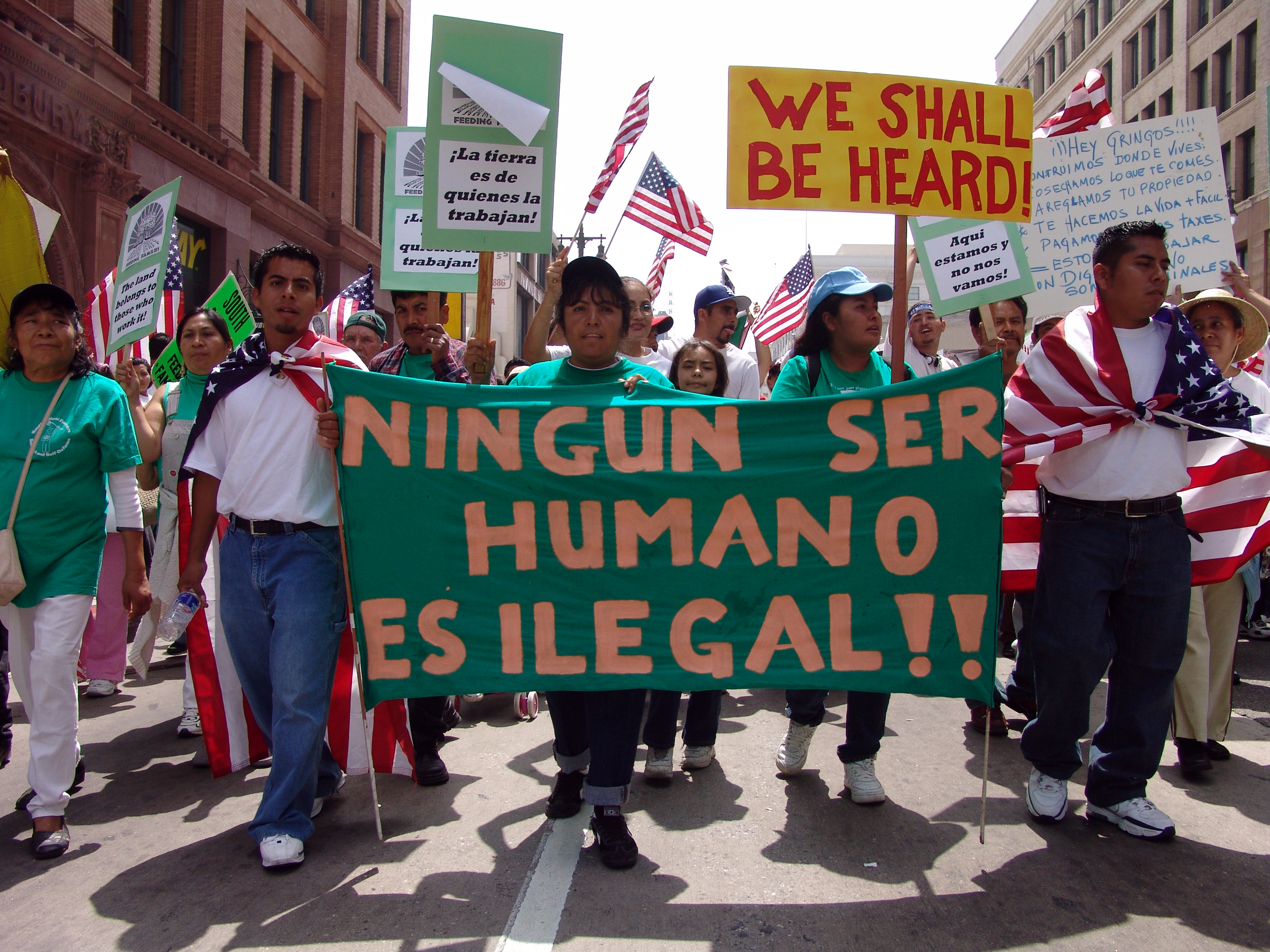
Spanish language signs at a May Day march in Los Angeles, in 2006

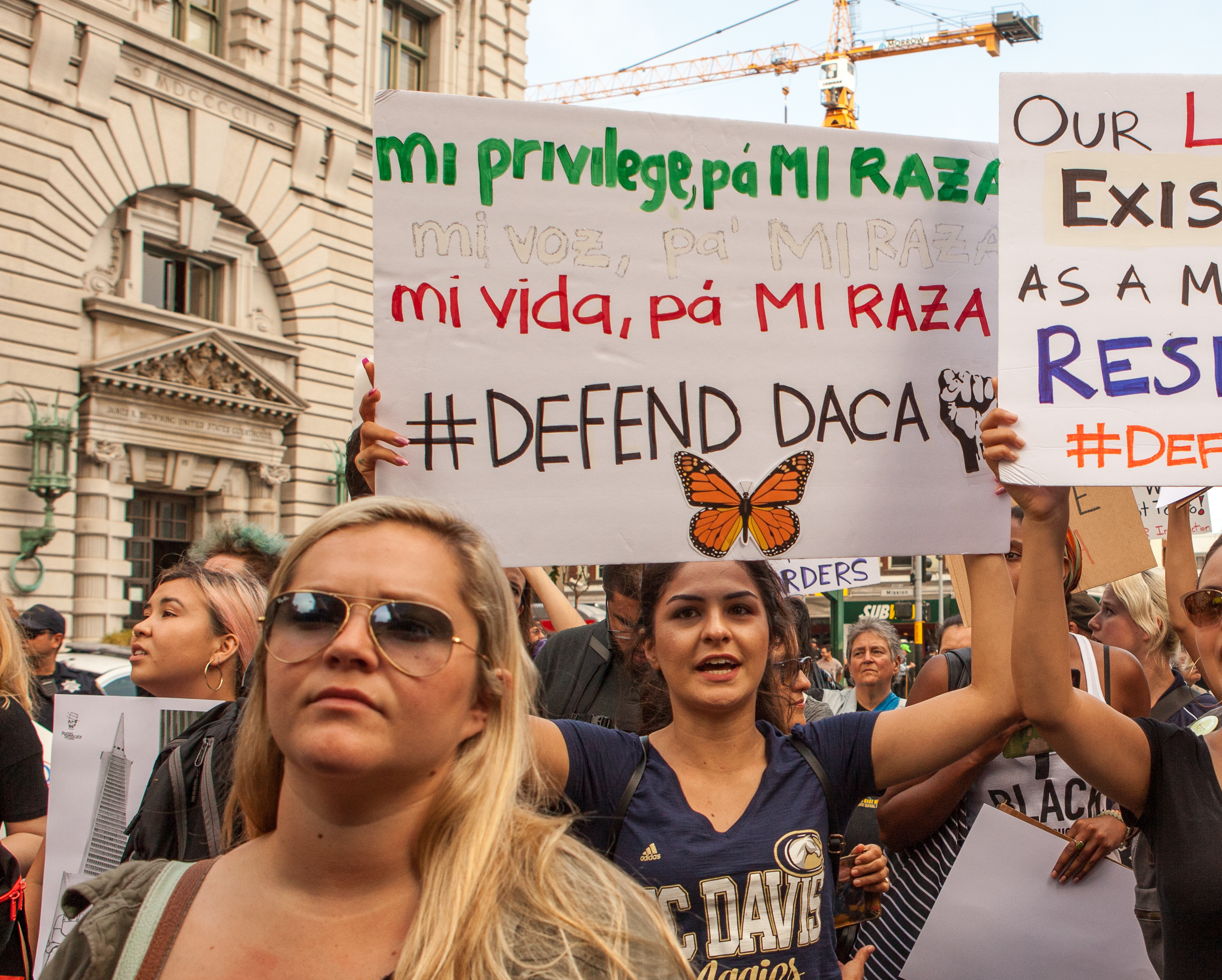
Spanish sign at a 2017 protest in support of DACA in San Francisco

Californian Spanish encompasses a number of linguistic varieties, including:

- Los Angeles Vernacular Spanish (español vernáculo de Los Angeles), abbreviated as LAVS, is a Southern Californian variety originating in the Greater Los Angeles area, which is primarily based in rural accents of Mexican Spanish, though with unique traits of its own. Characteristics of LAVS include:
  - The contraction of articles before vowels (l’avena, l’alfalfa, l’espada)
  - The simplification of consonant groups (/eklise/ <eclipse>, /sétimo/ <séptimo>, /elétriko/ <eléctrico>)
  - Lexical archaisms (i.e. mesmo, haiga, trujo, dende, agora)
  - Lenition of /ʝ/ to [j]
  - Diphthongization of vowel hiatus (/ljon/ <león>, /pjor/ <peor>, /twaʝa/ <toalla>, /kwete/ <cohete>)
  - Apheresis (pa <para>, tá <está>, ira <mira>, amá <mamá>)
  - Metathesis (/swidad/ <ciudad>)
  - Lexical contact phenomenons (carpeta, librería, troca, bil)
- Bay Area Spanish (español del Área de la Bahía) is a Northern Californian variety originating in the Bay Area. Also based in Mexican Spanish dialects, and notably influenced by Chicano English, Bay Area Spanish is noted for its features resulting from the California Vowel Shift, most notable having a more compressed vowel space than other Mexican Spanish dialects, owing to the high degree of Spanish-English bilingualism in the Bay Area, which has resulted in speakers transferring articulatory phonetics from one language to another, producing a similar modulation of the vowel space in both Spanish and English.
- Californio Spanish (español californio) is a historic variety spoken by early Californios throughout the Spanish, Mexican and early American eras of Californian history.

== See also ==
- Languages of California
  - California English – Dialect of English spoken in California
  - Chicano English – Dialect of English spoken in the Southwestern United States
  - Caló – Argot of Spanish spoken in the Southwestern United States
  - Indigenous languages of California – Native languages spoken in California
- Spanish in North America
  - Mexican Spanish
  - American Spanish
- Hispanics and Latinos in California

== Bibliography ==
- Sapiens, Alexander (June 1979). "Spanish in California: A Historical Perspective". Journal of Communication. 29 (2): 72–83. doi:10.1111/j.1460-2466.1979.tb02949.x.
- Acevedo, Rebeca (2013). "La tradicción histórica del español de California". Verbum et Lingua: Didáctica, Lengua y Cultura. 1 (1): 96–98.
- Valdés, Guadalupe; Fishman, Joshua A.; Chávez, Rebecca; Pérez, William (2006). "Chapter 3: The Spanish Language in California". Developing Minority Language Resources: The Case of Spanish in California. Multilingual Matters. pp. 24–53. doi:10.21832/9781853598999-005. ISBN 9781853598999.
- Colombi, María Cecilia (2006). "Multilingual California: Spanish in the Market". Multimodal Texts from Around the World. Palgrave McMillan. pp. 273–298. doi:10.1057/9780230355347_12. ISBN 978-1-349-32140-7.
- Medina, D. Xavier; Ugues, Antonio; Bowler, Shaun (2009-10-15). "Two Political Worlds? The Relevance of the Spanish Language in California Politics". California Journal of Politics and Policy. 1 (1). doi:10.5070/P2MP41.
- Covadonga Lamar Prieto (2012). El Español de California en el siglo XIX (PDF). University of California, Los Angeles.
- García, Sara Soledad (January 2008). "Spanish-English or English-Spanish in California: The Dialectics of Language in a Sociocultural Historical Context". Journal of Public Policy.
- Covadonga Lamar Prieto (1 July 2020). "Y al español de California no se lo tragó la tierra". Otros Diálogos de el Colegio de México. 12.
- Balestra, Alejandra (January 2006). "El tiempo futuro en el español de California (1800–1930): Incidencia del género en un cambio lingüístico en marcha". Spanish in Context. 3 (1): 72–83. doi:10.1111/j.1460-2466.1979.tb02949.x.
- Gutiérrez, Félix (1985). "The increase in Spanish-language media in California from 1970 to 1975: an index of the growing use of Spanish". International Journal of the Sociology of Language (53). doi:10.1515/ijsl.1985.53.115. S2CID 144668446.
- Moran, Kristin C. "The Development of Spanish-Language Television in San Diego: A Contemporary History" (PDF). Journal of San Diego History. 50 (1&2).
