= Etymology of California =

Origin of the name California

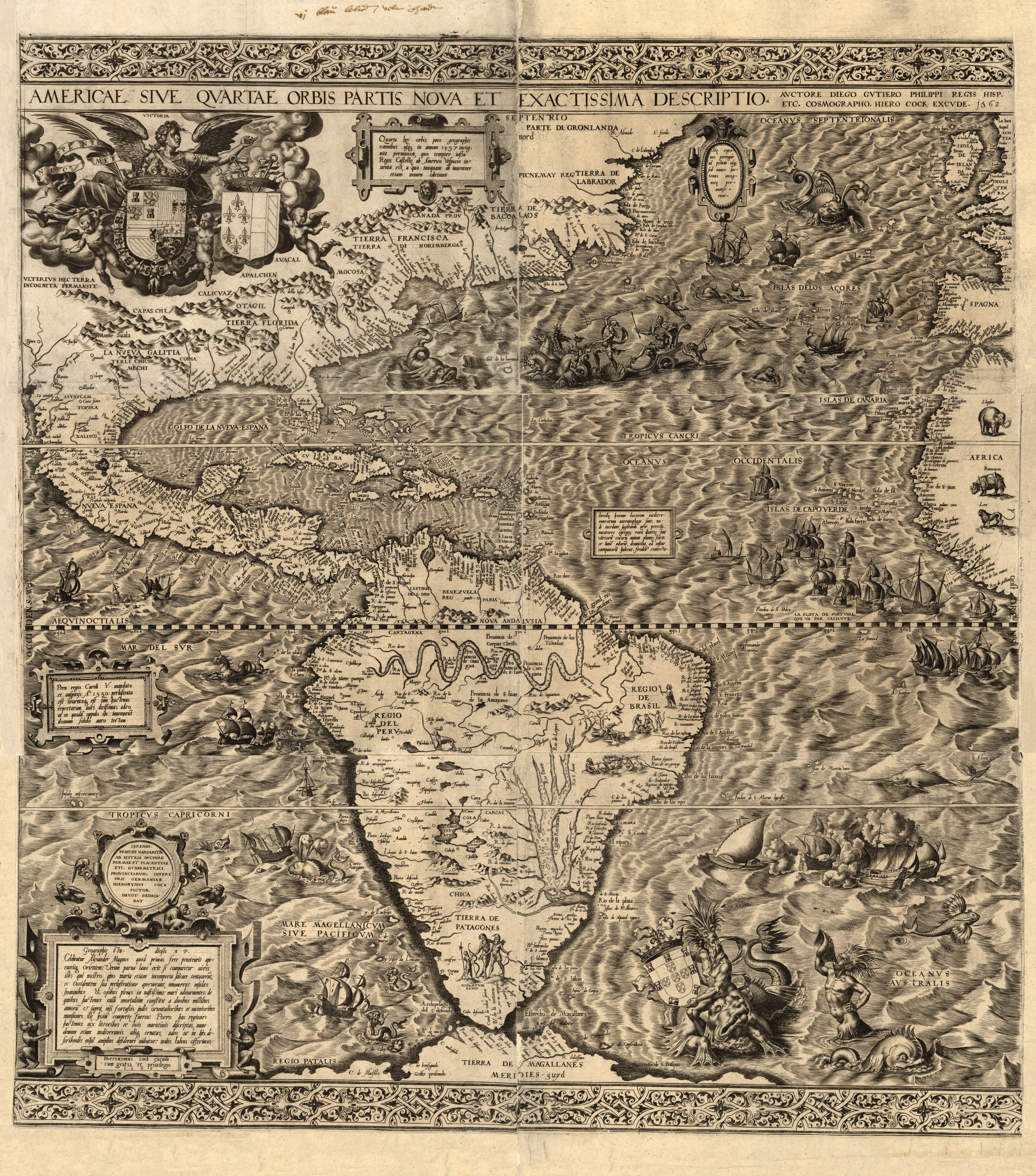
This 1562 map Americae Sive Quartae Orbis Partis Nova Et Exactissima Descriptio by Diego Gutiérrez was the first map to print the toponym California.

Multiple theories regarding the origin of the name California, as well as the root language of the term, have been proposed, but most historians believe the name likely originated from a Spanish 16th-century novel, Las sergas de Esplandián. The novel, popular at the time of the Spanish exploration of Mexico and the Baja California Peninsula, describes a fictional island named California, ruled by Queen Calafia, east of the Indies. (Note: At the time, "Indies" referred to India and the southeast Asian island groups influenced by India. The area is now referred to as the East Indies.) The author of the novel, Garci Rodríguez de Montalvo, also known as Ordóñez de Montalvo, is thought to have derived the name California from the Arabic Khalif and/or Khalifa, but he may also have been influenced by the place name "Califerne" in the Song of Roland, an 11th-century epic poem written in Old French.

When Spanish explorers in the 16th century first encountered the Baja California Peninsula, west of the Sea of Cortez, they believed the peninsula to be an island similar to the island described in de Montalvo's novel. They named the land California. Initially, California applied only to Baja California Peninsula; however, as Spanish explorers and settlers moved north and inland, the region known as California, or Las Californias, grew. Eventually it included not only the peninsula, but also the lands north of the peninsula, along the coast of today's U.S. state of California. Unlike the peninsula, this region was only practical to reach by sea voyages, and acquired a separate identity: Alta (Upper) California, making the lower territory Baja (Lower) California.

Today, the name California is shared by many places throughout the world, but is most commonly associated with areas of the southwest United States, and northwest Mexico. When used alone, California generally refers to the U.S. state of California, but when paired with the term "baja", or "lower", it can refer to the Baja California Peninsula, or one of the Mexican states on the peninsula, Baja California, or Baja California Sur. Collectively, the U.S. and Mexican states constitute a region referred to as The Californias.

== Las sergas de Esplandián origin theory ==
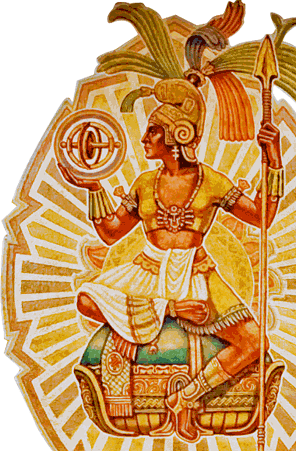
Queen Calafia, as depicted in California's Name, a 1937 mural by Lucile Lloyd, located at the California Capitol.

In the early 16th-century romance novel Las sergas de Esplandián (The Adventures of Esplandián), California was the name of a mythical island populated only by black warrior women. The popular Spanish novel was printed in several editions, with the earliest surviving edition published about 1510. The author was Garci Rodríguez de Montalvo, also known as Ordóñez de Montalvo. The novel described the Island of California as being east of the Indies, close to the Terrestrial Paradise, and ruled by Queen Calafia.

For many years the de Montalvo novel languished in obscurity, with no connection between it and the naming of California. That changed in 1862 when Edward Everett Hale made such a connection. He presented his findings to the Antiquarian Society that year, and then laid out his findings, along with a portion of the original novel, in the March 1864 issue of the Atlantic Monthly. Hale concluded that when Spanish explorers came upon the Baja California Peninsula, they named it California, after the fictional island in de Montalvo's book, because the explorers thought the peninsula was an island, east of the Indies, similar to the island described in de Montalvo's novel.

An excerpt from the novel, where California is first mentioned, using a contemporary Spanish translation:

Sabed que a la diestra mano de las Indias existe una isla llamada California muy cerca de un costado del Paraíso Terrenal; y estaba poblada por mujeres negras, sin que existiera allí un hombre, pues vivían a la manera de las amazonas. Eran de bellos y robustos cuerpos, fogoso valor y gran fuerza. Su isla era la más fuerte de todo el mundo, con sus escarpados farallones y sus pétreas costas. Sus armas eran todas de oro y del mismo metal eran los arneses de las bestias salvajes que ellas acostumbraban domar para montarlas, porque en toda la isla no había otro metal que el oro.

The English translation, as it appeared in the Atlantic Monthly in March 1864:

Know, then, that, on the right hand of the Indies, there is an island called California, very close to the side of the Terrestrial Paradise, and it was peopled by black women, without any man among them, for they lived in the fashion of Amazons. They were of strong and hardy bodies, of ardent courage and great force. Their island was the strongest in all the world, with its steep cliffs and rocky shores. Their arms were all of gold, and so was the harness of the wild beasts which they tamed and rode. For, in the whole island, there was no metal but gold.

–Las sergas de Esplandián, (novela de caballería)

by Garci Rodríguez de Montalvo.
Published in Seville in 1510.

Hale supposed that in inventing the names, de Montalvo held in his mind the Spanish word califa, the term for a leader of an Islamic community. Hale's joint derivation of Calafia and California was accepted by many, then questioned by a few scholars who sought further proof, and offered their own interpretations. George Davidson wrote in 1910 that Hale's theory was the best yet presented, but offered his own addition. In 1917, Ruth Putnam printed an exhaustive account of the work performed up to that time. She wrote that both Calafia and California most likely came from the Arabic word khalifa which means steward, (Note: The word khalifa خلیفة has a strong religious connotation in Arabic because the Quran states that man is the steward of God's earth, implying that he is neither its owner nor inheritor [Sura Al-Baqara 2:30].) successor or leader. The same word in Spanish was califa, easily made into California to stand for "land of the caliph" (خلیف), or Calafia to stand for "female caliph" (خلیفة). She also suggested California might have been inspired by Califerne in The Song of Roland.

=== Possible inspiration for Montalvo ===
Most scholars agree that Montalvo's Las sergas de Esplandián is the direct progenitor of the word California. However, no one knows absolutely how Montalvo derived the word—whether he invented it himself, formed it from the Arabic word khalifa, or was inspired by other works. Several unprovable theories have been put forward.

==== Califerne in Song of Roland ====
Putnam wrote that Montalvo's California might have been inspired by Califerne, a mysterious place mentioned in The Song of Roland, and perhaps named thus because it was the caliph's domain, a place of infidel rebellion. Chapman elaborated on this connection in 1921: "There can be no question but that a learned man like Ordóñez de Montalvo was familiar with The Song of Roland...This derivation of the word California can perhaps never be proved, but it is also plausible—and it may be added too interesting—to be overlooked." Polk characterized this theory as "imaginative speculation".

Polk wrote that another scholar offered the "interestingly plausible" suggestion that Roland's Califerne is a corruption of the Persian Kar-i-farn, a mythological "mountain of Paradise" where griffins lived.

French historian Prosper Boissonnade wrote in 1923 that a fortified city named Kal-Ifrene or Kalaa-Ifrene was located about four days march south of Bougie in Algeria. In the 11th century the city was an Arabic stronghold, manned by the Berber tribe of the Beni-Ifrene under their king Beni-Hammad. The city was feared and respected by Christian warriors of the Crusades. Based on his studies, Boissonnade felt that this city was the Califerne found in Song of Roland, and that it inspired Montalvo in turn. Contemporary California historians Herbert D. Austin and Rockwell D. Hunt wrote separately that this was a likely explanation.

The original French verse CCIX (lines 2920–2924):

Morz est mis nies, ki tant me fist cunquere
Encuntre mei revelerunt li Seisne,
E Hungre e Bugre e tante gent averse,
Romain, Puillain et tuit icil de Palerne
E cil d'Affrike e cil de Califerne;

An English translation of verse CCIX (lines 2920–2924):

Dead is my nephew, who conquered so much for me!
Against me will rebel the Saxons,
Hungarians, Bulgars, and many hostile men,
Romans, Apulians, and all those of Palermo,
And those of Africa, and those of Califerne;

–Song of Roland, Verse CCIX (lines 2920–2924), 11th century (Note: The original text for the Song of Roland, and English translation, follows Charles Scott Moncrieff (London, 1919), as reproduced at Orbis Latinus; many variant texts exist.)

==== Greek word kalli ====
Putnam discussed Davidson's 1910 theory that Montalvo's California was based on the Greek word kalli (meaning beautiful) but discounted it as exceedingly unlikely, a conclusion that Dora Beale Polk agreed with in 1995, calling the theory "far-fetched".

== Other origin theories ==
Several alternate theories have been proposed as possible origins of the word California, but they all have been dismissed, or at least determined by historians to be less compelling than the novel, Las sergas de Esplandián. Some of the most studied alternate theories include the following.

=== Calida Fornax ===
This term could derive from the Old Spanish *Calit Fornay, an alteration of the Latin Calida Fornax, meaning "hot furnace".

This theory may explain why the circa 1650 map of the Island of California has the name as two words, "Cali Fornia."

The word California may signify that it is a place that is hot in the manner of a lime kiln; both Spanish and Catalan have similar words taken from the Latin roots calcis (lime) and fornax (oven).

=== Kali forno ===
Another suggested source is kali forno, an indigenous phrase from one of the local Baja languages or Californian languages meaning "high mountains". However, the name "California" was printed in Montalvo's book before Spanish explorers spoke with Native Americans.

=== Calahorra ===
Another possible source for California's name may be Calahorra in Spain.

== Application of the name ==
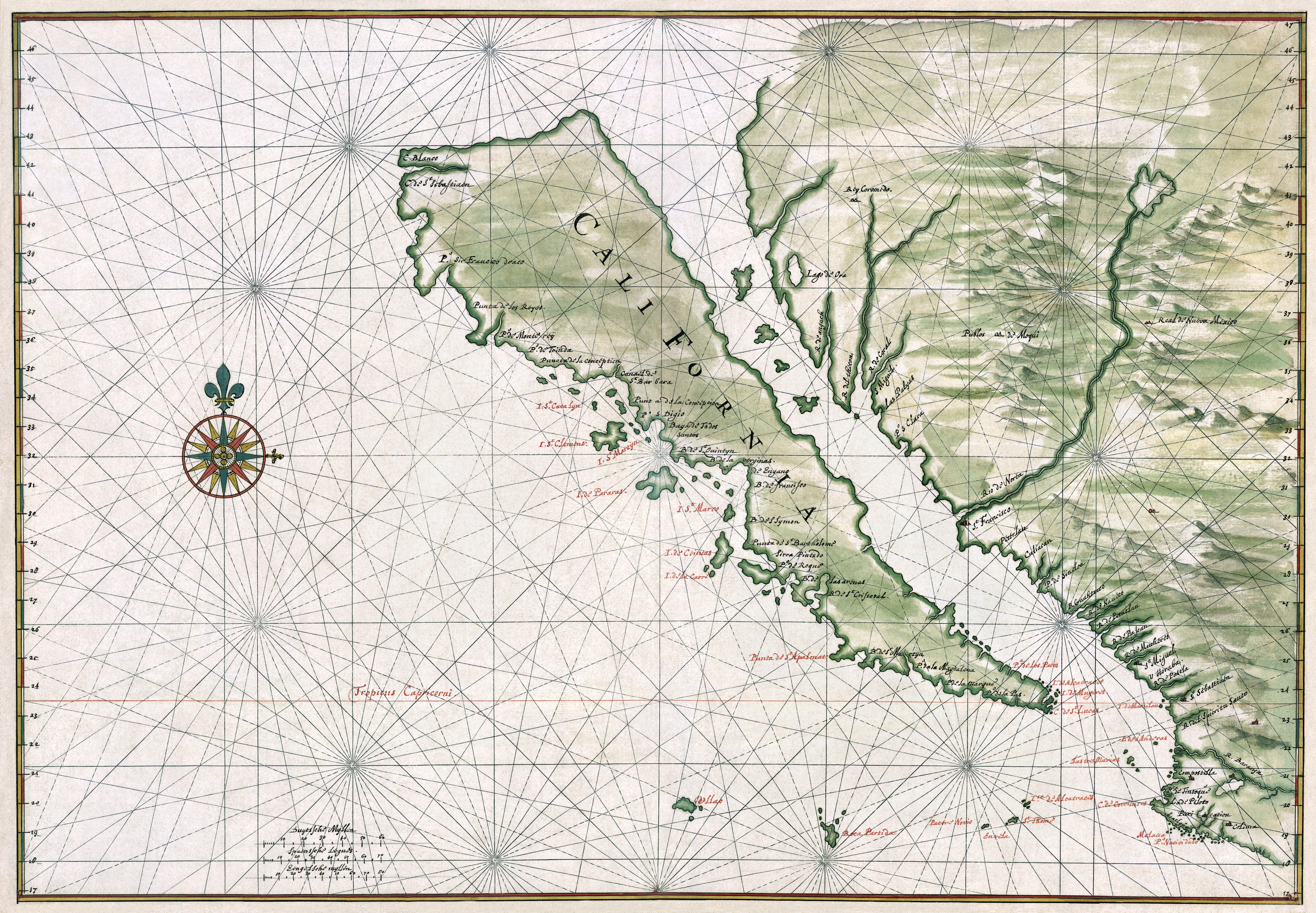
The Island of California, from a map c. 1650 (restored)

Hernán Cortés is often credited with being the first to apply the name California to the Baja Peninsula, but researchers believe it was more likely one of the men he assigned to do some advance exploration of the South Sea. Diego de Becerra and Fortún Ximénez, under the direction of Cortés, landed near the southern tip of the Baja California peninsula in 1533. They were the earliest explorers who would likely have applied the name California to the peninsula, thinking it was an island. Cortés did not reach the Baja peninsula until 1535, when he tried unsuccessfully to establish a colony that he named Santa Cruz (modern-day La Paz). Captain Bernal Diaz del Castillo, a soldier under Cortés, later used the name California in his memoirs in reference to Cortés's discovery.

It has also been suggested that Hernando de Alarcón, sent by the viceroy Mendoza—an enemy of Cortés—on a 1540 expedition to verify Cortés's discoveries, referred to the inhospitable lands as California, and it was he who named the peninsula after the fabled island in Las sergas. There is no question about Hernando de Alarcón's use of the term, nor about his allusion to Las sergas, but there is question as to whether this is the first use of the name to refer to those lands and whether he intended the name as mockery. Alarcón provides a clear link from the literary, imaginary California to the real place, but his usage cannot be proven to be the actual origin, in that the name may predate him.

Today the name California is applied to the Baja California Peninsula, the Gulf of California (also known as the Sea of Cortés), the U.S. State of California, and the Mexican states of Baja California and Baja California Sur.

== See also ==
- California (disambiguation)
- Etymology
- Toponymy
- United States
  - History of California
  - History of California before 1900
  - List of state and territory name etymologies of the United States
- Mexico
  - History of Mexico
  - List of Mexican state name etymologies
