= Calafia =

Fictional character in Las sergas de Esplandian

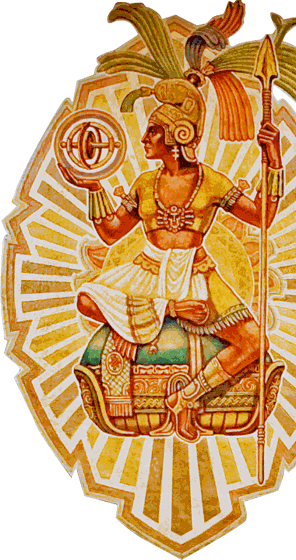
- Depiction of Queen Califia, part of California's Name, a 1937 mural by Lucile Lloyd, located at the California State Capitol
- First appearance: c. 1510
- Created by: Garci Rodríguez de Montalvo

In-universe information
- Gender: Female
- Title: Queen Calafia
- Occupation: Ruler of the Island of California
- Spouse: Talanque
- Nationality: Californian

Calafia, or Califia, is the fictional queen of the Island of California, first introduced by 16th century poet Garci Rodríguez de Montalvo in his epic novel of chivalry, Las sergas de Esplandián (The Adventures of Esplandián), written around 1510. Rodríguez's fictional Californie is most likely the namesake of the California region encompassing the U.S. state of California and the Mexican states of Baja California and Baja California Sur.

In the novel, Calafia is a pagan warrior queen who ruled over a kingdom of Black women living on the Island of California (an island off the coast of Asia). Calafia is convinced to raise an army of women warriors and sail away from California with a large flock of trained griffins so that she can join a Muslim battle against Christians who are defending Constantinople. In the siege, the griffins harm enemy and friendly forces, so they are withdrawn. Calafia and her ally Radiaro fight in single combat against the Christian leaders, a king and his son the knight Esplandián. Calafia is bested and taken prisoner, and she converts to Christianity. She marries a cousin of Esplandián and returns with the remainder of her army to California for further adventures.

The name of Calafia was likely formed from the Arabic word khalifa (religious state leader) that is known as caliph in English and califa in Spanish. Similarly, the name of Calafia's realm, California, likely originated from the same root, fabricated by the author to remind the 16th century Spanish reader of the reconquista, a centuries-long fight between Christian Iberians and Muslim Arabs that had recently concluded in Spain. The character of Calafia is used by Rodríguez de Montalvo to portray the superiority of chivalry in which the attractive virgin queen is conquered, converted to Christian beliefs, and married off. The book was very popular for many decades—Hernán Cortés read it—and it was selected by author Miguel de Cervantes as the first of many popular and presumed-harmful books to be burnt by characters in his famous novel Don Quixote.

Calafia has been the subject of modern-day sculpture, paintings, stories, and films; she often figures in the myth of California's origin, symbolizing an untamed and bountiful land prior to European settlement.

== Character ==
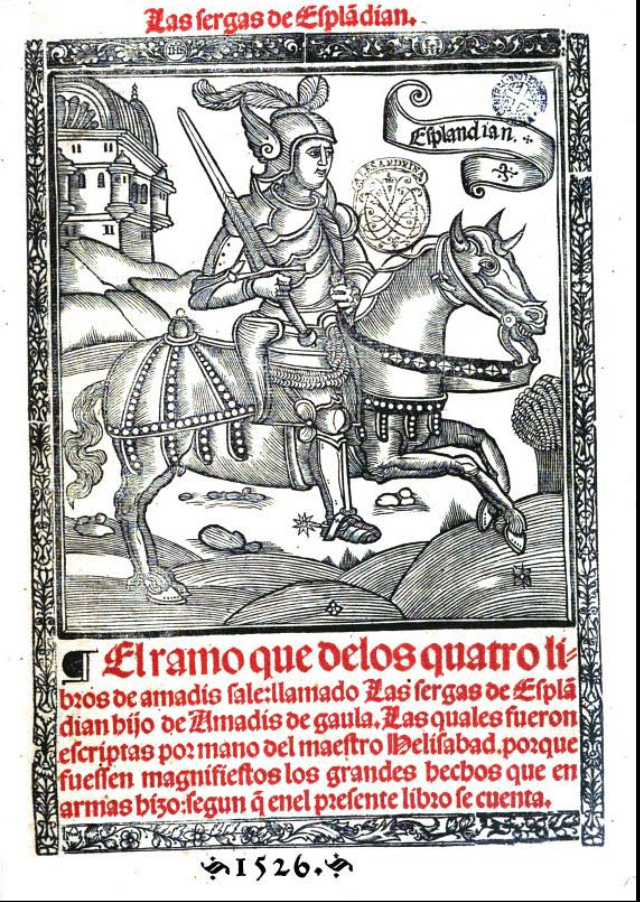
Queen Calafia and California's name originate in the old Castilian epic Las Sergas de Esplandián (The Adventures of Esplandián), written by Garci Rodríguez de Montalvo in 1510.

In the book The Adventures of Esplandián, after many pages of battles and adventures, the story of Calafia is introduced as a curiosity, an interlude in the narrative. Calafia is introduced as a regal black woman, courageous, strong of limb and large of person, full in the bloom of womanhood, the most beautiful of a long line of queens who ruled over the mythical realm of California. She is said to be "desirous of achieving great things"; she wanted to see the world and plunder a portion of it with superior fighting ability, using her army of women warriors. She commanded a fleet of ships with which she demanded tribute from surrounding lands, and she kept an aerial defense force of griffins, fabulous animals which were native to California, trained to kill any man they found.

Calafia meets Radiaro, a Muslim warrior who convinces her that she should join him in retaking Constantinople from the Christian armies holding it. Calafia, in turn, convinces her people to take their ships, weapons, armor, riding beasts, and 500 griffins, and sail with her to Constantinople to fight the Christians, though she has no concept of what it means to be Muslim or Christian. Her subjects arm themselves with weapons and armor made of gold, as there is no other metal in California. They fill their ships with supplies and hasten to sea.

Landing near Constantinople, Calafia meets with other Muslim warrior leaders who were unable to remove King Amadis and his Christian allies from the city, and she tells them all to hold back and watch her manner of combat—she says they will be amazed. The next morning, she and her women warriors mount their "fierce beasts" wearing gold armor "adorned with the most precious stones", advancing to invest the city. Calafia orders the griffins forward and they, hungry from the long sea voyage, fly out and maul the city's defenders. Sating their hunger, the griffins continue to snatch Christian men in their claws and carry them high in air only to drop them to their deaths. The city's defenders cower and hide from the griffins. Seeing this, Calafia passes word to her Muslim allies that they are free to advance and take the city. The griffins, however, cannot tell Muslim from Christian; they can only tell man from woman. The griffins begin snatching Muslim soldiers and carrying them aloft, dropping and killing them. Calafia questions her pagan faith, saying, "O ye idols in whom I believe and worship, what is this which has happened as favorably to my enemies as to my friends?" She orders her woman warriors to take the city's battlements and they fight well, taking many injuries from arrows and quarrels piercing the soft gold metal of their armor. Calafia orders her allies forward to assist the Californians in battle, but the griffins pounce again, killing Muslim men. She directs the griffin trainers to call them off, and the griffins return to roost in the ships. This inauspicious beginning weighed heavily on Calafia. To restore their honor she directed her forces to fight alongside those of her allies, with the griffins kept in the ships. Terrific battles raged along the city's walls but the attackers were repulsed. Calafia led a picked group of women warriors to attack a city gate, one held by Norandel, the half-brother of King Amadis. Norandel charged out of the gate against Calafia; upon meeting their two lances were broken but the warriors remained standing. They struck at each other with sword and knife, and a general melee ensued, Calafia throwing knights from their horses and taking great blows on her shield. Two more knights charge forward from the city, nobles named Talanque (a nephew of King Amadis) and Maneli, a prince of Ireland. These men nearly swamp Calafia in blows, and she can only be pulled back to friendly forces by her sister Liota who attacks the two knights "like a mad lioness". The day's battle left many dead including 200 of Calafia's women.

The story continues with the arrival of several more Christian princes and their armies. Radiaro and Calafia issue a challenge to two Christian warriors to engage them in single combat for the purpose of deciding the battle. King Amadis and his son Esplandián accept the challenge. The black-skinned warrior woman chosen as messenger tells Calafia that Esplandián is the most handsome and elegant man that has ever existed. Calafia determines that she must see the man herself before engaging him in combat. She stays awake all night wondering whether to wear royal robes or warrior's armor. Deciding in favor of a thick golden toga embroidered with jewels, topped by a golden hood, she rode to meet her enemies, escorted by 2,000 women warriors. After being seated among the Christian kings, she immediately recognized Esplandián from his great beauty, and fell in love with him. She tells him she will meet him on the field of battle and, if they should live, that she wishes to speak further with him. Esplandián considers Calafia an infidel, an abomination of the rightfully subservient position of woman in relation to man, and he makes no response.

The next day, Calafia duels with King Amadis, and Radiaro duels with Esplandián. With Leonorina, his betrothed, looking on, Esplandián masters Radiaro with a flurry of weapon thrusts. Calafia and Amadis trade blows until he disarms her and knocks her helmet off. Both Calafia and Radiaro surrender to the Christians. While being held prisoner, Calafia acknowledges the astonishing beauty of Leonorina, daughter of the Constantinople emperor and the intended bride of Esplandián, and resolves not to interfere with their union. She accepts Christianity as the one true faith, saying, "I have seen the ordered order of your religion, and the great disorder of all others, I have seen that it is clear that the law which you follow must be the truth, while that which we follow is lying and falsehood." She marries Talanque, a large and handsome knight who fought with her outside the city gate; similarly, her sister Liota marries Maneli, Talanque's companion in arms. The women return to California with their husbands to establish a new dynasty complete with both sexes, as a Christian nation. With her new husband in tow, the queen then goes on to "have many amazing adventures, including very large challenges, many battles and victories over great seigniories", with the narrator informing the reader that to recount them all would be "a never ending story."

== Etymology ==
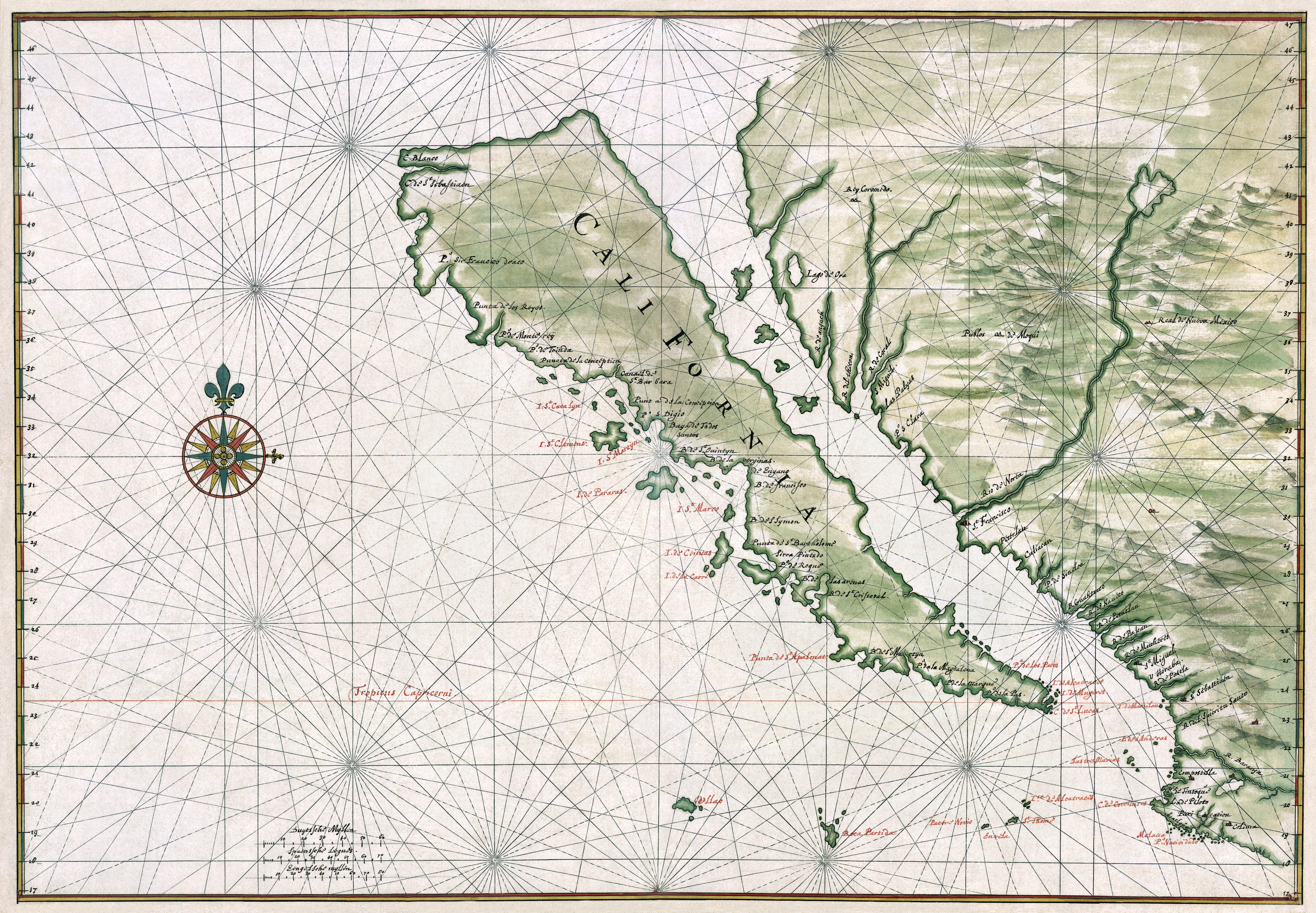
An early conception of the Island of California, this map is the result of partial exploration and guesswork.

The first voyage of Christopher Columbus in the late 15th century sparked a new interest in the search for "Terrestrial Paradise", a legendary land of ease and riches, with beautiful women wearing gold and pearls. Spanish author Garci Rodríguez de Montalvo drew upon reports from the New World to add interest to his fantasy world of chivalry and battle, of riches, victory, and loss, of an upside-down depiction of traditional sex roles. Around the year 1500 in his novel The Adventures of Esplandián, he writes:

Know ye that at the right hand of the Indies there is an island called California, very close to that part of the Terrestrial Paradise, which was inhabited by black women without a single man among them, and they lived in the manner of Amazons. They were robust of body with strong passionate hearts and great virtue. The island itself is one of the wildest in the world on account of the bold and craggy rocks.

The explorer Hernán Cortés and his men were familiar with the book; Cortés quoted it in 1524. As governor of Mexico he sent out an expedition of two ships, one guided by the famous pilot Fortún Ximénez who led a mutiny, killing the expedition's leader, Diego de Becerra, and a number of sailors faithful to Becerra. After the mutiny, Ximénez continued sailing north by northwest and, in early 1534, landed at what is known today as La Paz, Baja California Sur. Ximénez, who reported pearls found, believed the land was a large island. He and his escort of sailors were killed by natives when they went ashore for water. The few remaining sailors brought the ship and its story back to Cortés. There is some dispute whether the land was named at this time—no record exists of Ximénez giving it a name.

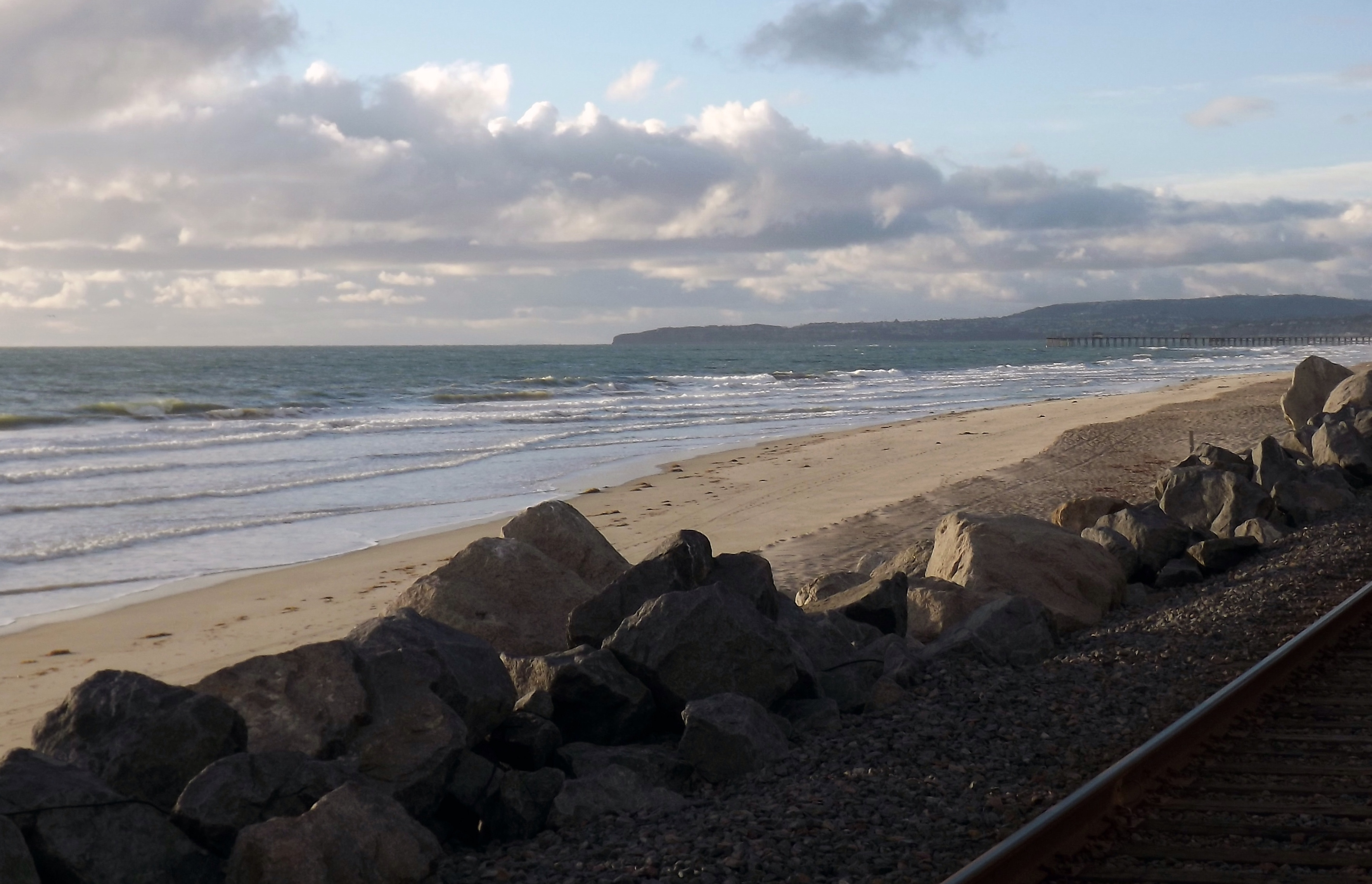
Calafia State Beach, located in San Clemente, California

In 1535, Cortés led an expedition back to the land, arriving on May 1, 1535, a day known as Santa Cruz de Mayo, and in keeping with methods of contemporary discoverers, he named it Santa Cruz. It is not known who first named the area California but between 1550 and 1556, the name appears three times in reports about Cortés written by Giovanni Battista Ramusio. However, the name California also appears in a 1542 journal kept by explorer Juan Rodríguez Cabrillo, who used it casually, as if it were already popular. In 1921, California historian Charles E. Chapman theorized that Ximénez named the new land California but the name was not accepted by Cortés because Ximénez was a mutineer who killed Becerra, a kinsman of Cortés. Despite this, the name became the one used popularly by Spaniards, the only name used by non-Spaniard Europeans, and by 1770, the entire Pacific coast controlled by Spain was officially known as California. The Spanish-speaking people who lived there were called Californios.

For many years, the Rodríguez de Montalvo novel languished in obscurity, with no connection known between it and the name of California made by English-speaking American settlers. In 1864, a portion of the original was translated by Edward Everett Hale for The Antiquarian Society, and the story was printed in the Atlantic Monthly magazine. Hale supposed that in inventing the names, Rodríguez de Montalvo held in his mind the Spanish word calif, the term for a leader of the Muslim people. Hale's joint derivation of Calafia and California was accepted by many, then questioned by a few scholars who sought further proof, and offered their own interpretations. George Davidson wrote in 1910 that Hale's theory was the best yet presented, but offered his own addition.

In 1917, Ruth Putnam printed an exhaustive account of the work performed up to that time. She wrote that both Calafia and California most likely came from the Arabic word khalifa which means ruler or leader. The same word in Spanish was califa, easily made into California to stand for "land of the caliph", or Calafia to stand for "female caliph". Putnam discussed Davidson's 1910 theory based on the Greek word kalli (meaning beautiful) but discounted it as exceedingly unlikely, a conclusion that Dora Beale Polk agreed with in 1995, calling the theory "far-fetched". Putnam also wrote that The Song of Roland held a passing mention of a place called Califerne, perhaps named thus because it was the caliph's domain, a place of infidel rebellion. Chapman elaborated on this connection in 1921: "There can be no question but that a learned man like Ordóñez de Montalvo was familiar with the Chanson de Roland ...This derivation of the word 'California' can perhaps never be proved, but it is too plausible—and it may be added too interesting—to be overlooked." Polk characterized this theory as "imaginative speculation", adding that another scholar offered the "interestingly plausible" suggestion that Roland's Califerne is a corruption of the Persian Kar-i-farn, a mythological "mountain of Paradise" where griffins lived.

In 1923, Prosper Boissonnade, Dean of Literature at the University of Poitiers, wrote that a fortified capital city in 11th century Algeria was built and defended by the Beni-Iferne tribe of Berber people. This city was called Kalaa-Iferne or Kal-Iferne by the Arabs, and was certainly known at the time in Spain; today it is the ruins known as Beni Hammad Fort. Boissonnade said the Arab name of this fortress city likely inspired Roland and later Rodríguez de Montalvo, such that Kal-Iferne became first Califerne and then California. John William Templeton describes how Hernán Cortés' expedition in search of California had Africans as a third of his crew, including his second-in-command, Juan Garrido. Templeton says that Calafia is exemplary of a genre of literature from the 14th to the 16th centuries that featured black women as powerful, wealthy and beautiful. Historian Jack Forbes wrote that the Spanish were quite experienced in being ruled by Africans given the Moorish occupation from 710 to 1490.

== Legends of an island of women warriors ==
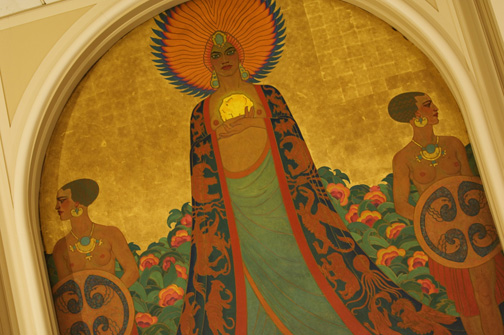
Mural of Queen Calafia and her Amazon warriors, painted in 1926 by Maynard Dixon and Frank Van Sloun, located at the Mark Hopkins Hotel in San Francisco, California

Rodríguez de Montalvo's description of Calafia, her people and her country was based upon many centuries of stories of Amazons, groups of woman warriors who fought like men. As well, the story of an island paradise filled with gold and pearls was a recurring theme that Rodríguez de Montalvo was familiar with. In seeking new land, Spanish explorers were often led onward after hearing about a land of gold, or a land ruled by women. California historian Lynn Townsend White, Jr wrote that they considered the as-yet undiscovered California "a land of Orient with fantastic attributes". The novel about Esplandián and Calafia's domain had a strong influence on the searching Conquistadors, who believed they might find a nation of women and riches somewhere at the edge of the known world.

In Greek mythology, Amazons are described as a nation of female warriors who live in kingdoms outside of recognized civilization, women who fight with Greek warriors. They appear in many Greek tales including those by Homer, and they are usually killed or otherwise subdued by male warriors. Male hostility to the woman warriors is expressed by Dictys of Crete who wrote that an Amazon queen "transgressed the boundaries of nature and of her sex." Niketas Choniates, a medieval Greek historian, wrote about women warriors who fought alongside men in the Second Crusade, riding horses "unashamedly astride" (rather than modestly sidesaddle), dressed as men and maintaining a very warlike appearance. Jacques de Vitry, a Bishop of Acre, and a historian of the Crusades, wrote about Amazons who fought who were stronger than men because their vitality was not "consumed in frequent copulation." In some stories, women warriors fought alongside Muslim men and in others they allied themselves to Christian armies.

Some of the tales of Amazons describe them as having dark skin. In Africa, King Musa I of Mali was protected by black female Royal Guards on his famous and influential hajj to Mecca in 1332. Johann Schiltberger wrote in 1440 about a group of Tatar Amazons, Mongol giantesses led by a vengeful princess. Columbus returned to Spain with the story of an island in the Lesser Antilles called "Matinino" (perhaps modern Martinique) that was inhabited only by women, a tale told to him by many of the natives of the West Indies. Columbus did not call the Matinino women "Amazons", but the comparison was drawn by his contemporaries.

When encountering natives in the New World, Spanish explorers were occasionally told of a tribe composed entirely of women. One such tale was related to Cortés about a group of Amazons supposedly living in a province called Ciguatán. Juan de Grijalva was told of Amazons during his 1518 expedition through the Tabasco region of Mexico. Nuño de Guzmán followed tales of a nation of women who lived in riches on or near the sea, women with whiter skin who were accounted goddesses by the natives. He described how they used bows and arrows, and lived in many towns. Polk characterized Guzmán as driven by lust for sex and riches—his greed and sadism were well known.

== Legacy ==
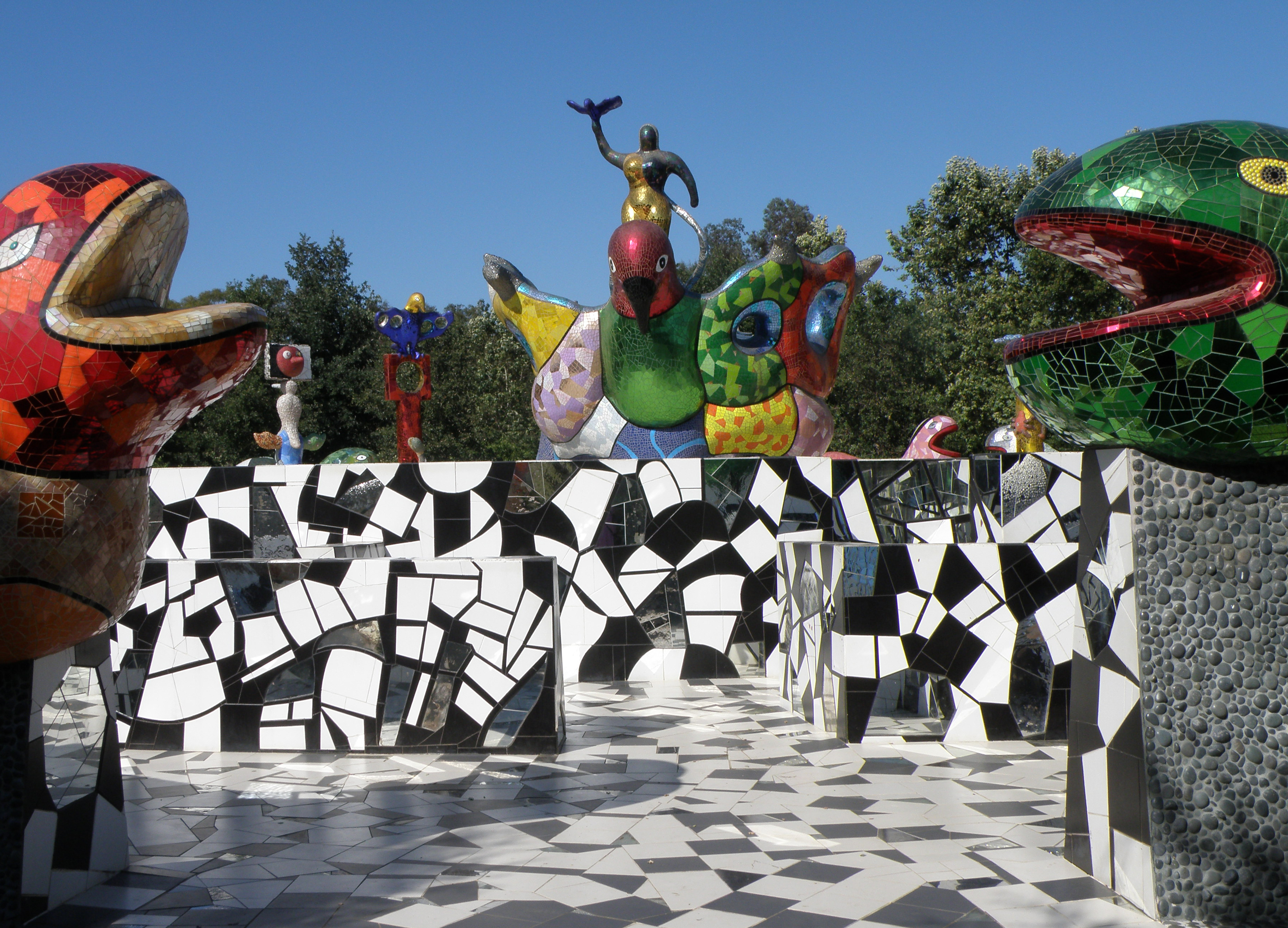
Queen Califia's Magical Circle, a sculpture garden by artist Niki de Saint Phalle, located in Escondido, California

Spanish novelist Vicente Blasco Ibáñez wrote a book entitled La reina Calafia (Queen Calafia) in 1924.

A 1926 portrayal of Queen Calafia and her Amazons is found in a mural in the Room of the Dons at the Mark Hopkins Hotel in San Francisco. It was created for the opening of the hotel in 1926 by Maynard Dixon and Frank Van Sloun, and has been called "the first embodiment of Queen Califia" though criticized as showing her "haughty and aloof".

In 1937, Lucile Lloyd unveiled her triptych mural "Origin and Development of the Name of the State of California", also known as "California Allegory", which was displayed at the State Building in Los Angeles until 1975 when the building was demolished for safety reasons. The paintings were archived, and in 1991 they were restored and mounted in the California Room of the California State Capitol, room 4203, renamed the John L. Burton Hearing Room. The regal central figure shows Queen Calafia depicted as a Mayan warrior-priestess, holding a spear in her left hand and examining a gyroscope in her right.

In 1931, Diego Rivera finished his first U.S. mural, "The Allegory of California," for the Pacific Coast Stock Exchange building (now the City Club of San Francisco), which has a woman as its central figure, holding up the industries and abundance of California. Rivera called the central figure "California", and used the famous tennis player Helen Wills as his model. Most observers agreed in calling the central figure "California", describing it as a mother earth archetype, possibly harking back to portrayals of the Roman goddess Pomona, who stood for agricultural abundance. After some webpage postings in the 2000s, the figure has sometimes been labeled Calafia.

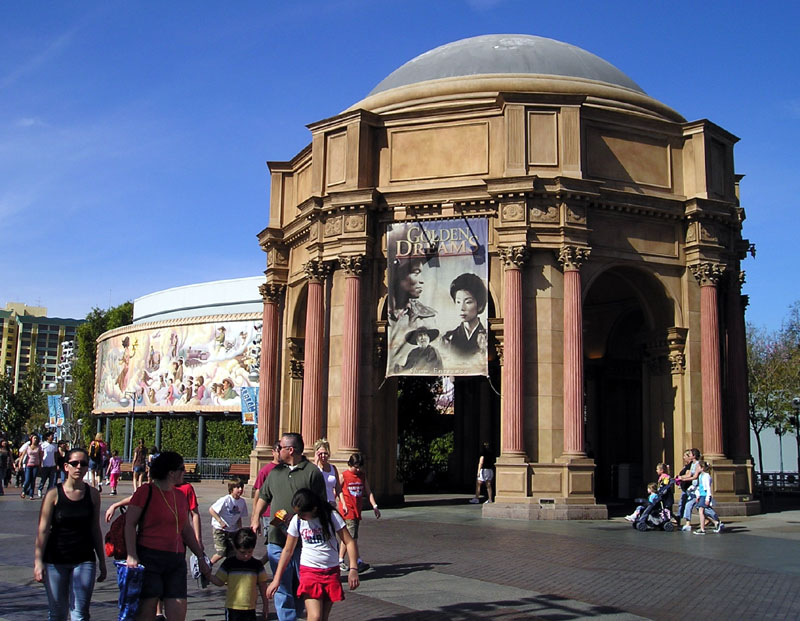
Golden Dreams was an experience at Disney California Adventure showcasing the history of California and narrated by Queen Califia, as portrayed by Whoopi Goldberg.

The publication of Our Roots Run Deep, the Black Experience in California, Vol. 1 was the lead story in the Sunday Examiner and Chronicle on February 1, 1992, as reporter Greg Lewis pointed out the book's depiction of the Queen Calafia story as particularly noteworthy. An exhibition featuring Queen Calafia followed in 1995 at the Historic State Capital Museum in Sacramento with subsequent showings in the sixth Floor Gallery of the San Francisco Main Library and the Los Angeles Central Library. In 1998, the California Council on Humanities funded the seminar The Black Queen: Primary Sources in California History to promote additional primary source research in California African-American history.

The mural of Queen Calafia is featured at the top of the new African-American Freedom Trail brochure produced by ReUNION: Education-Arts-Heritage and San Francisco Travel in November 2013.

Within the Society for Creative Anachronism, the San Diego, California, local chapter is the Barony of Calafia, established in 1972.

Los Angeles Times columnist Jack Smith owned a sailboat that he named Califia, which he would occasionally write about in his column.

In November 1975, the 11,000-capacity Plaza de Toros Calafia was completed, a bullfighting arena in the city of Mexicali, the capital of the Mexican state of Baja California. The arena is also known as la reina Calafia (Queen Calafia).

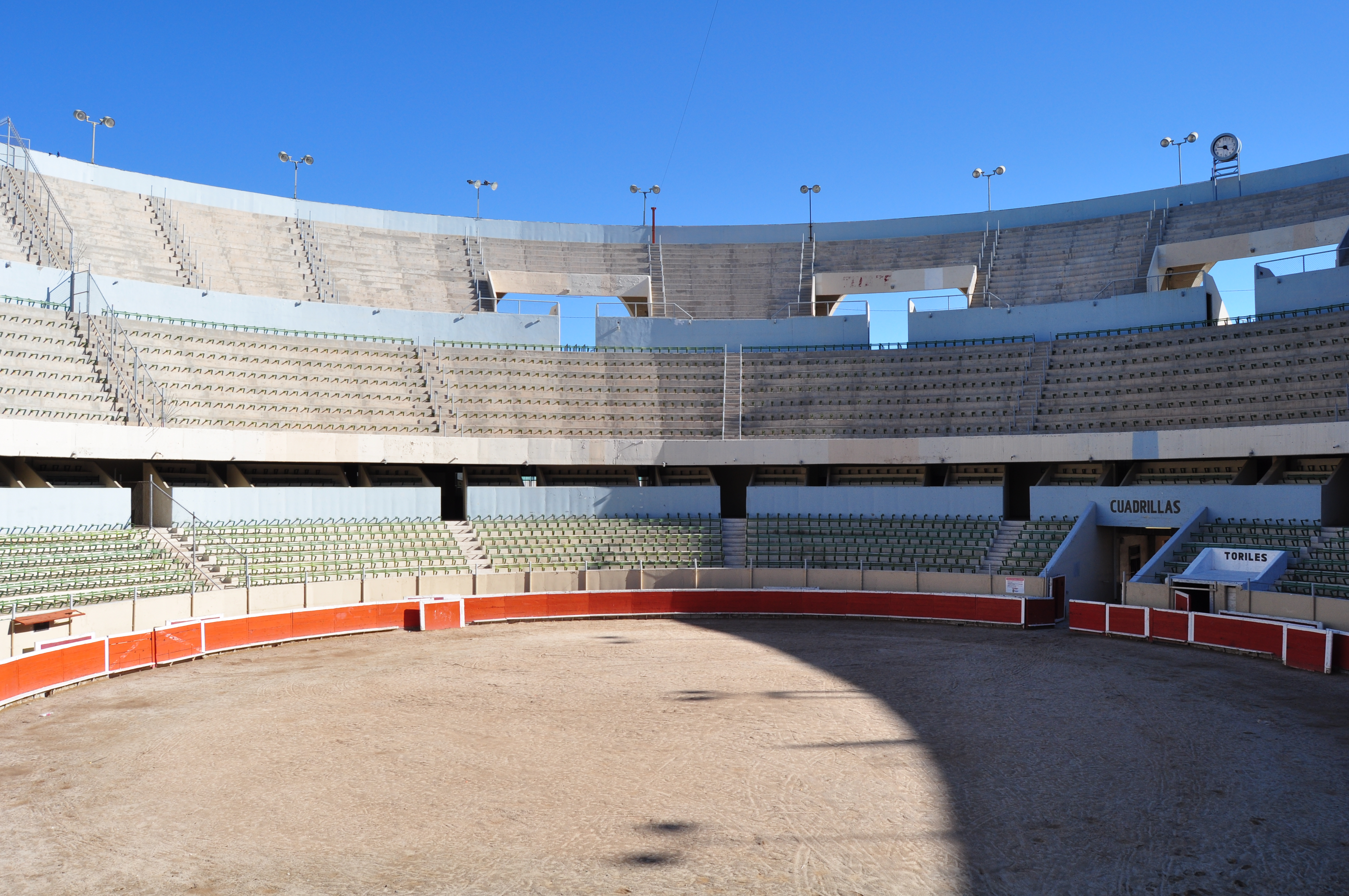
Plaza Calafia arena, located in Mexicali, Baja California

Queen Califia's Magical Circle, an outdoor sculpture garden in Escondido, California, opened in 2003, designed by famed French-American designer and artist Niki de Saint Phalle. The central character of Queen Califia is presented wearing gold glass armor atop a stylized giant bird. The final work on the sculpture garden was overseen by de Saint Phalle's granddaughter and by her assistants and technical advisers.

In 2004, the African American Historical and Cultural Society Museum in San Francisco assembled a Queen Califia exhibit, curated by John William Templeton, featuring works by artists such as TheArthur Wright and James Gayles; artistic interpretations of Calafia. The show displayed a 1936 treatment of Lucile Lloyd's "California Allegory" triptych, with Queen Califia as the central figure. Templeton said that "Califia is a part of California history, and she also reinforces the fact that when Cortes named this place California, he had 300 black people with him." Templeton pointed out that Columbus had a black navigator and that Africans were seen by Europeans as being culturally advanced in the 15th century. William E. Hoskins, director of the museum, said that very few people know the story of Queen Califia. He said, "One of the things we're trying to do is let people have the additional insight and appreciation for the contributions of African Americans to this wonderful country and more specifically to the state of California", adding that "the Queen Califia exhibit is particularly poignant."

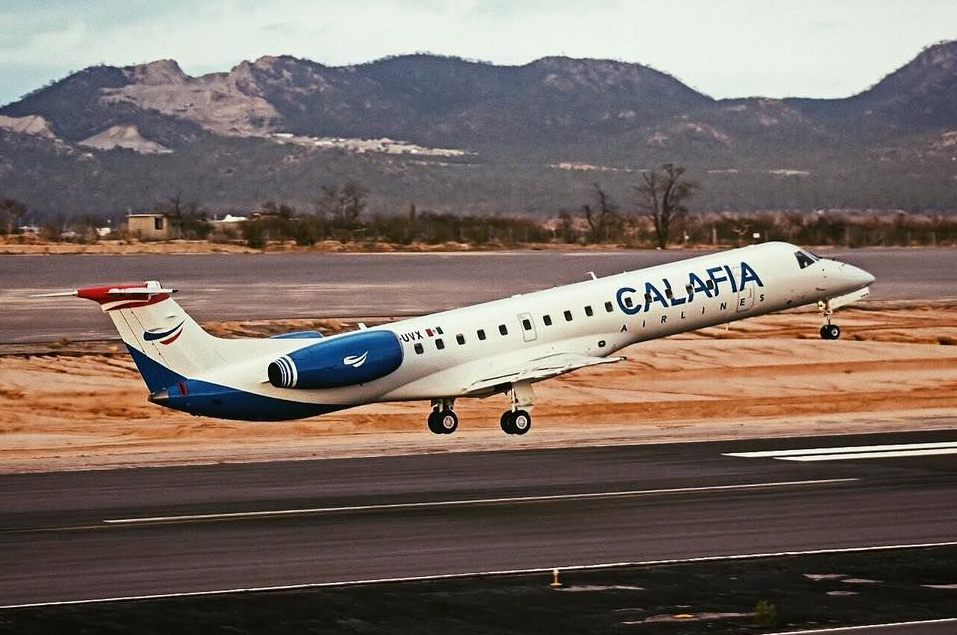
Calafia Airlines is a regional airline based in Cabo San Lucas serving the Baja California Peninsula.

Califia makes an appearance in the 2015 video game Code Name: S.T.E.A.M., appearing as a member of Abraham Lincoln's strike force. In 2018, Queen Calafia and the mythical island of California will be the inspiration for the Mexicali Biennial, an arts program focusing on art from Mexico and California. Entitled Calafia: Manifesting the Terrestrial Paradise, it will showcase performance, visual arts and mixed media events to interrogate the concept of myth in California's origin story.

Golden Dreams was a 23-minute film and multimedia experience showing the history of California through several recreated scenes, narrated by Whoopi Goldberg as Califia, the Queen of California. A bust of Goldberg attired in queenly raiment was the target of a projected image showing Goldberg narrating the story—the sculpture appeared to come to life. The attraction, at Disney California Adventure Park at the Disneyland Resort in Anaheim, California, opened with the park on February 8, 2001. It closed to the general public on September 7, 2008, and was open only to school groups until March 2009. It was demolished in July 2009 to make way for the construction of a dark ride called The Little Mermaid: Ariel's Undersea Adventure.

In 2021, the town of Sausalito, California staged the "Queen Calafia Welcoming Event", in which the Sausalito Historical Society and local actors depicted the fictional return of Queen Calafia to present-day California, in celebration of the legendary queen and the etymology of California.
