= List of Mexican state name etymologies =

This article provides a collection of the etymologies of the names of the states of Mexico.

| State name | Language of origin | Source word | Meaning and notes |
|---|---|---|---|
| Aguascalientes | Spanish | aguas calientes | "Hot waters". When the city was first founded in 1575, it was given this name for the abundance of hot springs in the region, which still are exploited for numerous spas and for domestic use. The state was named after its capital city, Aguascalientes City. |
| Baja California | Spanish | | "Lower California". The Spanish colony of California was divided into two—upper and lower—in 1804. See also: Origin of the name California. |
| Baja California Sur | Spanish | | "Southern Baja California". The southern part of Baja California See also: Origin of the name California. |
| Campeche | Yucatec Mayan | Kaan Peech | The state takes its name from the city of Campeche, which was founded in 1540 by Spanish Conquistadores as San Francisco de Campeche atop the preexisting Maya city of Canpech or Kimpech. The native name means "place of snakes and ticks." |
| Chiapas | Nahuatl | Chiapan | "Place where the chia sage grows" |
| Chihuahua | Nahuatl | xicuahua | The state takes its name from its capital city, Chihuahua City. This name is thought to derive from the Nahuatl Xicuahua, or "dry, sandy place". |
| Coahuila | Nahuatl | coatl + huila | Origin disputed. May mean "serpent that flies" (coatl "snake" + huila "to fly") or "place of many trees" (quautli "trees" + la "abundance") |
| Colima | Nahuatl | Coliman | The state takes its name from its capital city, Colima City. |
| Durango | Basque | | The state is named after its capital city, Durango City, which was named after the city of Durango in the Basque Country, northern Spain. During colonial times it was part of the Spanish realm of Nueva Vizcaya, "New Biscay", a province of New Spain. |
| Guanajuato | Purépecha | Quanax Huato | "Place of the monstrous frogs". The state is named after its capital city, Guanajuato City. |
| Guerrero | Spanish | | "Warrior". Named after Vicente Guerrero, a hero of the Mexican War of Independence and an early president of Mexico. The surname Guerrero, meaning "warrior" in Spanish, is derived from guerra "war", a Germanic loanword related to the English word war. |
| Hidalgo | Spanish | | Named after Miguel Hidalgo y Costilla, considered the initiator of the Mexican War of Independence in 1810. See also: Hidalgo (nobility) |
| Jalisco | Nahuatl | Xālixco | "Place with sand on the ground". |
| México | Nahuatl | Mēxihco | The state is named after the Mexica. |
| Michoacán | Nahuatl | Michhuahcān | "Place of possessors of fish". |
| Morelos | Spanish | | Named after José María Morelos, one of the leaders of Mexico's struggle against Spain during the War of Independence. |
| Nayarit | Cora | Naáyeri (plural: Naáyerite) | "Place of Nayar", referring to a 16th-century Cora chief |
| Nuevo León | Spanish | | "New Leon". Named after the Kingdom of León, one of the historical realms that formed Spain. |
| Oaxaca | Nahuatl | Huāxyacac | After its capital city, Oaxaca City, whose name in turn derives from the Nahuatl for "on the nose of the huajes", huajes being a type of tree with an edible pod quite common locally. |
| Puebla | Spanish | Pueblo | "Town" or "the people" (that live in the town). The state is named after its capital city, Puebla City. The state name is from the verb poblar |
| Querétaro | Purépecha | Crettaro | "Juego de pelota" or "cañada". The state is named after its capital city, Querétaro City. |
| Quintana Roo | Spanish/Galician-Portuguese | | Named after Andrés Quintana Roo, a hero from the War of Independence. |
| San Luis Potosí | Spanish | | Named after Louis IX, and the mines of Potosí in Bolivia. |
| Sinaloa | Mayo | sinalobola | Origin of name is disputed. May mean "round pitahaya (cacti)" or "cut corn" |
| Sonora | Opata | xunuta | "In the place of the corn". |
| Tabasco | Nahuatl | Tlapaco | The name appears in the chronicles of Bernal Díaz del Castillo during the conquest era, who says it comes from the name of a river in the area, Tabasco River. |
| Tamaulipas | Huasteca Nahuatl | Tamaholipa | "Place with high mountains". |
| Tlaxcala | Nahuatl | Tlaxcallān | "Place of tortillas". The state is named after the capital of Tlaxcala City, which is named after the pre-Columbian city-state of Tlaxcallan. |
| Veracruz | Spanish | vera cruz | "True Cross." The state is named after the port of Veracruz City. This name was given to the first Spanish city in New Spain by Hernán Cortés in 1519, in the form La Villa Rica de la Vera Cruz, "The Rich Village of the True Cross". |
| Yucatán | Chontal Maya | Yokot'an | An apocryphal story goes that when the Spaniards first waded ashore on the Yucatán Peninsula, they asked the members of the local population, who were watching, "What is this place?" The local inhabitants, not understanding Spanish, asked "What did you say?" (Yuca-hatlanás?). The Spanish assumed that anyone would understand their language, and took it to be the name. Another legend has it that when Spaniards asked a local native "Where are we?", the native answered "Yuc Atan", meaning "I'm not from here", which Spaniards assumed as the name of the place. The most likely derivation is from the native Chontal Maya people, who call themselves Yokot'anob or Yokot'an, "speakers of Yoko ochoco." |
| Zacatecas | Nahuatl | zacatēcah | "People from the Place of Grass". The state is named after its capital city, Zacatecas City. |
