= Las sergas de Esplandián =

1510 novel by Garci Rodríguez de Montalvo

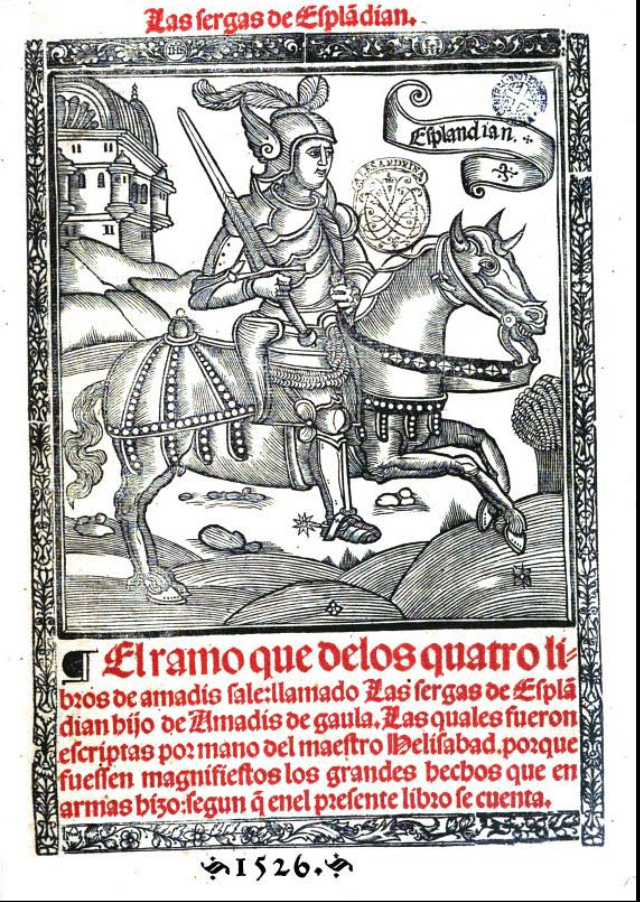
- Author: Garci Rodríguez de Montalvo
- Language: Spanish
- Genre: Chivalric romance
- Published: July 1510
- Publication place: Spain

Las Sergas de Esplandián (The Adventures of Esplandián) is a novel written by Garci Rodríguez de Montalvo in the late fifteenth or early sixteenth century. The novel is a sequel to a popular fifteenth century set of chivalric romance novels, Amadís de Gaula. The name of California likely originated in Las Sergas de Esplandián, which featured the island of California ruled by its Queen Calafia.

== History ==
The original Amadis was in three volumes, but Montalvo added a fourth that is considered to be completely his own work. Upon completion, Montalvo wrote the sequel, Las Sergas de Esplandián, regarding the exploits of Esplandián, the son of Amadis. The oldest known surviving edition of this work was published in Seville in July 1510. Earlier editions are thought to have been published in Seville as early as 1496. Ruth Putnam argues that Montalvo finished his novel sometime after 1492, but before Queen Isabella died in 1504. Montalvo is thought to have died in 1505, leaving some of his works to be published after his death.

In the sixth chapter of Don Quixote, written by Miguel de Cervantes in 1605, Montalvo's sequel is mentioned as one of the books in Quixote's library. When Quixote's niece, the housekeeper, and the parish curate set out to destroy Quixote's library, considered the source of Quixote's fanciful behavior, Las Sergas de Esplandián is the first book selected for the pyre.

The first that master Nicholas put into his hands was Amadis de Gaul, in four parts; and the priest said, "There seems to be some mystery in this, for as I have heard say, this was the first book of chivalry printed in Spain, and all the rest have had their foundation and rise from it; and therefore I think, as head of so pernicious a sect, we ought to condemn him to the fire without mercy." — "Not so, Sir," said the barber; "for I have heard also that it is the best of all the books of this kind: and therefore, as being singular in his art, he ought to be spared." — "It is true," said the priest, "and for that reason his life is granted him for the present. Let us see the other which stands next him." — "It is," said the barber, "the Adventures of Esplandian, the legitimate son of Amadis de Gaul." — "Verily," said the priest, "the goodness of the father shall avail the son nothing; take him, mistress Housekeeper, open yon casement, and throw him into the yard, and let him give a beginning to the pile for the intended bonfire."

— Miguel de Cervantes, The Ingenious Gentleman Don Quixote de la Mancha, chapter 6, translated by Charles Jervas

== California ==
Chivalric novels were popular at the time the Spanish empire was beginning to explore the New World. Such novels were a mix of truth, lore, and fiction, but with little clarity as to where each aspect of the novels fell. The explorers used the novels as a source of inspiration, while the authors of the novels, in turn, used the reports of new explorations to embellish their tales.

The Esplandián novel describes a fictional island named California, inhabited only by black women, ruled by Queen Calafia, and east of the Indies. When Spanish explorers, under the command of Hernán Cortés, learned of an island off the coast of Western Mexico, and rumored to be ruled by Amazon women, they named it California. Believing the Pacific Ocean, then called the South Sea, was much smaller than it turned out to be, the island seemed to precisely be east of the Indies just as the island of California was described in Montalvo's novel. Once the island was determined to be a peninsula, the name California had already been adopted, and the "island" eventually became known as the Baja California Peninsula.

The novel achieved particular notability in 1862, when Edward Everett Hale concluded that the novel was the origin of the name California.

== Bibliography ==
- Polk, Dora Beale (1995). The Island of California: A History of the Myth. Lincoln, Nebraska: University of Nebraska Press. ISBN 0803287410.
