= Ruth Putnam (author) =

American author and academic (1856–1931)

Ruth Putnam (18 July 1856, Yonkers, New York – 12 February 1931, Geneva, Switzerland) was an author, suffragist, and alumni trustee of Cornell University.

One of eleven children of the publisher George Palmer Putnam and his wife Victorine Haven Putnam, she received her bachelor's degree in 1878 from Cornell University (in 1873 Emma Sheffield Eastman had been the first woman to graduate from Cornell University). Putnam wrote a number of historical works and consulted original sources in Dutch, French, and German, as well as English. She also wrote a biography of her eldest sibling Mary Corinna Putnam Jacobi, who was a famous physician and suffragist.

== Selected publications ==
- as collaborator with Alfred John Church: The Count of the Saxon Shore; of, The Villa in Vectis. A Tale of the Departure of the Romans from Britain. Putnam. 1887. (historical novel)
- William the Silent, Prince of Orange, the Moderate Man of the Sixteenth Century: The Story of His Life as Told from His Own Letters, from Those of His Friends and Enemies, and from Official Documents. Vol. 2 vols. Putnam. 1895. ISBN 9780790582078. (translated into Dutch as Willem de Zwijger, Prins van Oranje (1900) by Dirk Christiaan Nijhoff)
- Annetje Jans' farm. Half Moon Series, v. 1, no. 3. G. P. Putnam's. 1897.
- as editor with Eva Palmer Brownell, Maud Wilder Goodwin, and Alice Carrington Royce: Historic New York. Vol. 1, 1897, vol. 2, 1898. G.P. Putnam's sons.
- as translator with Oscar Albert Bierstadt: History of the people of the Netherlands. Vol. 5 vols., 1898–1912. G. P. Putnam's sons.; a translation and abridgment of the 8-volume Geschiedenis van het Nederlandsche volk by Petrus Johannes Blok
- A Mediæval Princess; being a True Record of the Changing Fortunes Which Brought Divers Titles to Jacqueline, Countess of Holland, together with an Account of her Conflict with Philip, Duke of Burgundy (1401–1436). G.P. Putnam's Sons. 1904.
- Charles the Bold, Last Duke of Burgundy. Heroes of the Nations. G.P. Putnam's Sons. 1908.
- William the Silent: Prince of Orange (1533–1584) and The Revolt of the Netherlands. Heroes of the Nations. G.P. Putnam's Sons. 1911.
- Alsace Lorraine from Cæsar to Kaiser, 58 B.C.–1871 A.D. G.P. Putnam's Sons. 1915.
- with the collaboration of Herbert Ingram Priestley: California: The Name. Berkeley, University of California press. 1917. (about the etymology of California)
- Luxemburg and Her Neighbours: a Record of the Political Fortunes of the Present Grand Duchy from the Eve of the French Revolution to the Great War, with a preliminary sketch of events from 963 to 1780. G. P. Putnam's sons. 1918.
