= Garci Rodríguez de Montalvo =

Spanish writer (c. 1450–1505)

- Born: c. 1450; Medina del Campo, Kingdom of Castile
- Died: 1505 (aged 54–55)
- Occupation: Author
- Writing career
- Pen name: Garci Ordóñez de Montalvo; García Gutiérrez de Montalvo; García de Montalvo el Viejo
- Language: Early Modern Spanish
- Genres: Fiction, chivalric romance

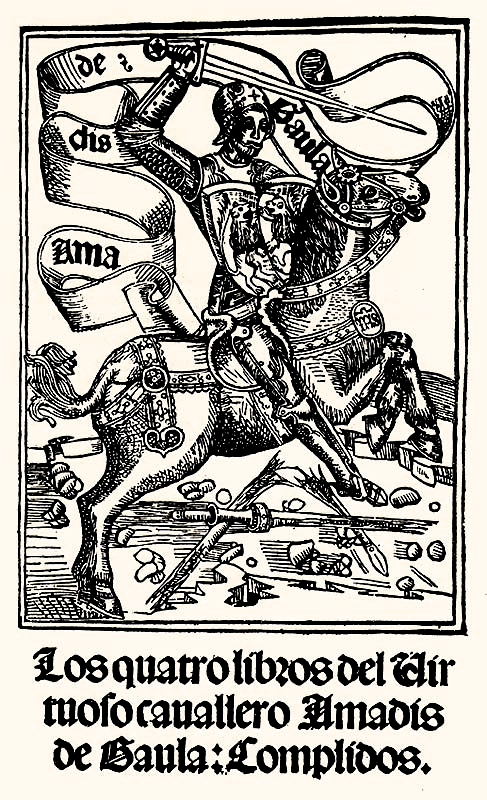
Los cuatro libros de Amadís de Gaula, Zaragoza: Jorge Coci, 1508

Garci Rodríguez de Montalvo (Spanish: [ˈɡaɾθi roˈðɾiɣeθ ðe monˈtalβo]; c. 1450 – 1505) was a Castilian author who arranged the modern version of the chivalric romance Amadís de Gaula, originally written in three books in the 14th century by an unknown author. Montalvo incorporated a fourth book in the original series, and followed it with a sequel, Las sergas de Esplandián. It is the sequel that Montalvo is most often noted for, mainly because within the book he coined the word California.

Montalvo is known to have been referred to by several other names, including Garci Ordóñez de Montalvo, García Gutiérrez de Montalvo and García de Montalvo el Viejo.

== Biography ==
Montalvo was born in Medina del Campo in the Province of Valladolid, Spain. He came from an influential family, belonging to the Pollino lineage, one of the seven who dominated Medina's council policy. This lineage came from Martín Gutiérrez de Montalvo, VIII lord of Botalorno. At one time Montalvo had the title Alderman of Medina del Campo and was clerk of the land of the surrounding town. In 1482 he was part of a contingent sent from Medina del Campo to guard Alhama in the Province of Granada, which had recently been captured from the Moors.

Garci Rodríguez de Montalvo had three children: Pedro Vaca, Juan Vaca Montalvo and Francisco Vaca. His grandson García de Montalvo participated in the conquest of Venezuela and Peru around 1540 and was an informant for Fernández de Oviedo.

Records of a lawsuit held in the Chancery of Valladolid show that by 1505 Montalvo had died. Most of his works may have been published after his death.

== Las Sergas de Esplandián ==
Montalvo spent many years translating and recasting the Amadis of Gaul novels and appending a fourth book of his own. He then wrote a sequel, Las sergas de Esplandián (The Adventures of Esplandián), in which he tells the life and wandering of Amadis' eldest son. In the sequel Montalvo described a mythical Island of California as being west of the Indies:

Know, that on the right hand of the Indies there is an island called California very close to the side of the Terrestrial Paradise; and it is peopled by black women, without any man among them, for they live in the manner of Amazons.

The novel was highly influential in motivating Hernán Cortés and other explorers in the discovery of the "island", which they believed lay along the west coast of North America. In 1539, Francisco de Ulloa, sailing under the commission of Cortés, explored the Gulf of California and the coast of Baja California peninsula, determining that it was a peninsula, not an island. Nevertheless, the cartographic misconception of California as an island persisted on many European maps well into the 18th century.

Many more authors contributed sequels to the saga after Montalvo, including Feliciano de Silva, Ruiz Paes de Ribera, and Juan Diaz.

== See also ==
- Amadís de Gaula
- Calafia
- History of California
- Origin of the name California
