= Fortún Ximénez =

Spanish sailor and the first European known to have landed in Baja California

Fortún Ximénez Bertandoña (pronounced [foɾˈtun ʃiˈmeneθ]; died 1533) was a Spanish sailor of Basque origin who led a mutiny during an early expedition along the Pacific Coast of Mexico and is the first European known to have landed in the Baja California peninsula.

Ximénez was the pilot of a ship, the Concepción, sent by Hernán Cortés and captained by Diego de Becerra. The ship set out November 30, 1533, to travel north along the coast of New Spain from present-day Manzanillo, Colima, in search of two ships that had been lost without a trace on a similar voyage the previous year. The previous voyages had been in search of the "Strait of Anián" (the western end of the much-hoped-for Northwest Passage) and the Island of California, named for the mythical places in the romance novel, Las sergas de Esplandián previously published in Spain and popular among the conquistadors. The fictional California was a terrestrial paradise populated only by dark-skinned women.

During the voyage, Ximénez led a revolt in which the captain was killed. The mutineers then landed near present-day La Paz, on the southern tip of the Baja California peninsula, which the mutineers believed to be the Island of California. Ximénez was killed in a clash with the local natives. The survivors returned to New Spain with the story of having black pearls, which prompted further exploration of the "Island" of Santa Cruz, as Cortés named the peninsula.

The stories of the survivors prompted several follow-up expeditions by Cortés in the following years, which resulted in very short-lived pearl fisheries.

== See also ==
- Francisco de Ulloa

== Sources ==
- Caughey, John W. California, second edition (Englewood: Prentice-Hall, 1953), 45–46.
- Chapman, Charles E. A History of California: The Spanish Period (New York: The MacMillan Co., 1921), 50–51.
- Wilson, J. G.; Fiske, J., eds. (1900). "Becerra, Diego" . Appletons' Cyclopædia of American Biography. New York: D. Appleton.
