= Lucile Lloyd =

American muralist, decorative painter, illustrator

- Born: August 28, 1894; Cincinnati, Ohio, U.S.
- Died: February 25, 1941 (aged 46)
- Other names: Lucile Lloyd Brown, Lucila Lloyd Nulty
- Education: Woman's Art School at Cooper Union, Art Students League of New York
- Known for: Muralist, Illustrator, Decorative Painter
- Spouses: Addison Brown, Jr. (m. 1919–1925) Niel McNulty (m. 1936–1939)

Lucile Lloyd, also known as Lucile Lloyd Brown, Lucila Lloyd Nulty (August 28, 1894 – February 25, 1941) was an American muralist, illustrator, and decorative painter. In 1937, Lloyd worked with the Works Progress Administration's Federal Arts Project to paint three murals in the assembly room in the state building in Los Angeles, California.

== Early life ==
Lloyd was born in Cincinnati, Ohio. Her parents were Mary Alice (Holcomb) and Harry Kensington Lloyd. She apprenticed in her father's stained-glass and textile design studio. Her English grandfather was a textile designer during the Arts and Crafts movement.

She attended school at the Woman's Art School at Cooper Union in New York City and won two scholarships to the Art Students League of New York. While at Cooper Union she studied with Frank Fairbanks, Frederick Dielman, Robert Tyland, and Joseph C. Chase. She was the first woman to work in the drafting room of architect Bertram G. Goodhue and painted her first mural decoration at the age of twenty.

In 1919 Lloyd married Addison Brown II, son of Addison Brown. They had one child, Addison Brown III.

== Career ==
Lloyd moved with her husband and son to California in 1919. She opened a studio, taught classes and took the role of directorship of the Stickney Memorial Art School in Pasadena. Lloyd worked as a muralist and decorator and also produced bookplates, cartoons, logos, water color, charcoal, architectural renderings and stained-glass designs. She worked with many well-known architectural firms, including: Howard Hewitt; Marsh, Smith, and Powell; Carleton Monroe Wilson; and, the West Coast office of Bertram Goodhue.

In 1923, Lloyd contributed an article in the December issue of California Southland entitled "The Relationship Between Architecture and Decoration", in which she acknowledges that while the architect has the vision, it is the interior specialist that brings together the decorative elements that complete a space. Lloyd mentions the need for time to research and create full scale working drawings as well as full color renderings. She goes on to stress that muralists such as herself be included from the onset of a project. "Bringing in an artist at the last minute can lead to a displeased client". "If the client could only be persuaded to put the money he spends, later, on landscapes or genre paintings which do not go with his house, into one good ceiling for over-mantel, which becomes a part of the architecture of his home, he would be better satisfied in the end." She closed the article by saying that while mural artists "speak the language of trade painters, murals artist are not to be confused with 'house painters'".

In 1925, her spouse Addison Brown II divorced her and moved with their two-year-old child back to the East Coast.

The Madonna of the Covered Wagon (1928) was a large mural completed at a middle school in south Pasadena. The scene recalls a journey made by thousands of pioneer families as they came west during the 1800s. While the work was considered by some contemporary critics as saccharine, it is typical of the Illustrators School which was the style of her time. Los Angeles Times art critic Arthur Millier gave the work high praise, saying, "her delightful mural combines humor and sentiment in delightful proportions.

Lloyd was one of six artists who submitted drawings for the murals at Griffith Observatory. She was a member of the California Art Club, Women Painters of the West, American Bookplate Society and the California State Historical Association.

She married her second husband Niel McNulty in 1936; he died in 1939.

== Death ==
Lucile Lloyd died by suicide in February 1941, "overcome by gas".

== Commissioned artwork ==
Select list of commissioned artwork
| Year | Name | Location | Notes |
|---|---|---|---|
| 1916 | Music room ceiling murals | John E. Aldred Estate, Glen Cove, New York | A Bertam Goodhue architecture project. |
| 1917 | Mural on the great hall ceiling | Philip W. Henry house in Scarborough, New York | A Bertam Goodhue architecture project. |
| 1923 | 'Episodes of Beowulf' | Hanson House, Flintridge, California | |
| 1925 | Murals and ceiling beams | First Baptist Church Pasadena, Pasadena, California | |
| 1928 | Madonna of the covered Wagon, mural on the proscenium of the auditorium | South Pasadena Junior High (now known as South Pasadena Middle School), Pasadena, California | Lloyd, under the auspices of the architectural firm of Marsh, Smith, Powell, created the 39" X 7" foot oil painting. The Madonna of the Covered Wagon was executed on canvas at the artist's studio and installed in the proscenium of the auditorium after completion. The scene recalls a journey made by thousands of pioneer families as they came West during the 1800s. The sheer cliffs of El Capitan are shown on the right rising high about the banks of the Merced River. |
| 1929 | Ceilings; First Methodist Episcopal Church | Santa Ana, California | |
| 1929 | Children's rooms | Ives and Warren Mortuary, Pasadena, California | |
| 1930 | Kindergarten Frieze | Stoneman Elementary School, San Marino, California | Mural was preserved in 1997 by Nathan Zakheim, son of muralist, Bernard Zakheim. |
| 1930 | Ceilings and mural | First Baptist Church Chapel, Pasadena, California | |
| 1930 | Administration Building murals | South Pasadena Schools, California | |
| 1930 | South Pasadena Public Library | Pasadena, California | |
| 1930 | Auditorium ceiling | Sierra Madre Grade School, Sierra Madre, California | |
| 1930 | | Newport Harbor Union High School, Newport Beach, California | |
| 1931 | Ceilings | Hollywood Citizen News building, Hollywood, California | |
| 1931 | Auditorium | El Centro Elementary School, South Pasadena, California | |
| 1931 | Facade | Averill-Morgan Company, Hollywood, California | |
| 1931 | Auditorium | Long Beach Polytechnic High School, Long Beach, California | |
| 1931 | Interiors | Mannings Restaurant, Long Beach, California | |
| 1931 | Study Hall ceiling | Excelsior Union High School, Norwalk, California | |
| 1931 | Ceilings and porch | 87th Street Elementary School (Manchester Ave Elementary School), Los Angeles, California | |
| 1931 | Celings | Pacific Colony (later Lanterman Developmental Center), Spadra, California | |
| 1931 | Murals, suites | Dr. I. Eugene Gould, Pasadena, California | |
| 1932 | Three wall panels | Hollywood National Bank | |
| 1932 | Ceiling and Murals | Hotel Miramar, Santa Monica, California | |
| 1932 | | Eagle Rock High School | |
| 1932 | Altarpiece | St. Mary of the Angels Anglican Church, Hollywood | |
| 1932 | | Virgil Junior High, Los Angeles, California | |
| 1932 | Mural 'Peter Pan' | East Whittier Middle School, East Whittier, California | |
| 1932 | Gymnasium ceiling | Foshay Junior High School, Los Angeles, California | |
| 1933 | Library ceiling | Hollywood High School, Los Angeles, California | |
| 1933 | Border frames on murals, main murals by Dean Cornwell | Library Rotunda, Los Angeles Central Library, Los Angeles, California | |
| 1933 | | La Chappelle Residence, Beverley Hills, California | |
| 1933 | Interiors | Manning's Restaurant, Los Angeles, California | |
| 1934 | Third floor remodel | Broadway Department Store, Los Angeles, California | |
| 1934 | Entrance | Jeweler's Exchange Building, Los Angeles, California | |
| 1936 | Windows | mausoleum at Inglewood Cemetery, Inglewood, California | |
| 1937 | Three murals, California's Name | Assembly Room, State Building, Los Angeles, California | The mural, titled "California's Name", was dedicated on October 16, 1937, at the Los Angeles State Building at 217 West First Street on the Civic Center, hung in an Assembly room. The middle is approximately 16×13 ft and side panels 6.5×13 ft. Since 1992, these murals now reside in the Burton Hearing Room, California State Capitol, Sacramento, California. The murals were moved after the original site was damaged in the 1971 San Fernando earthquake. |

== Publications ==
A list of articles and essays penned by Lucile Lloyd about her mural work.

| Year | Article title | Publication | Notes |
|---|---|---|---|
| 1941 | Does the Sun Make the Wind? | | |
| undated | How A Plane Flies | | |
| 1940 | Plymouth Weaving Stunts | | |
| 1940 | Textiles | | |
| 1940 | Travel By Water | | |
| 1928 | South Pasadena Junior Highschool | | |
| 1933 | St. Mary of the Angeles Church | | |
| 1928 | Stoneman Elementary School | | |
