= Instituto Loaiza Cordero para Niños Ciegos Historic District =

- U.S. National Register of Historic Places
- U.S. Historic district
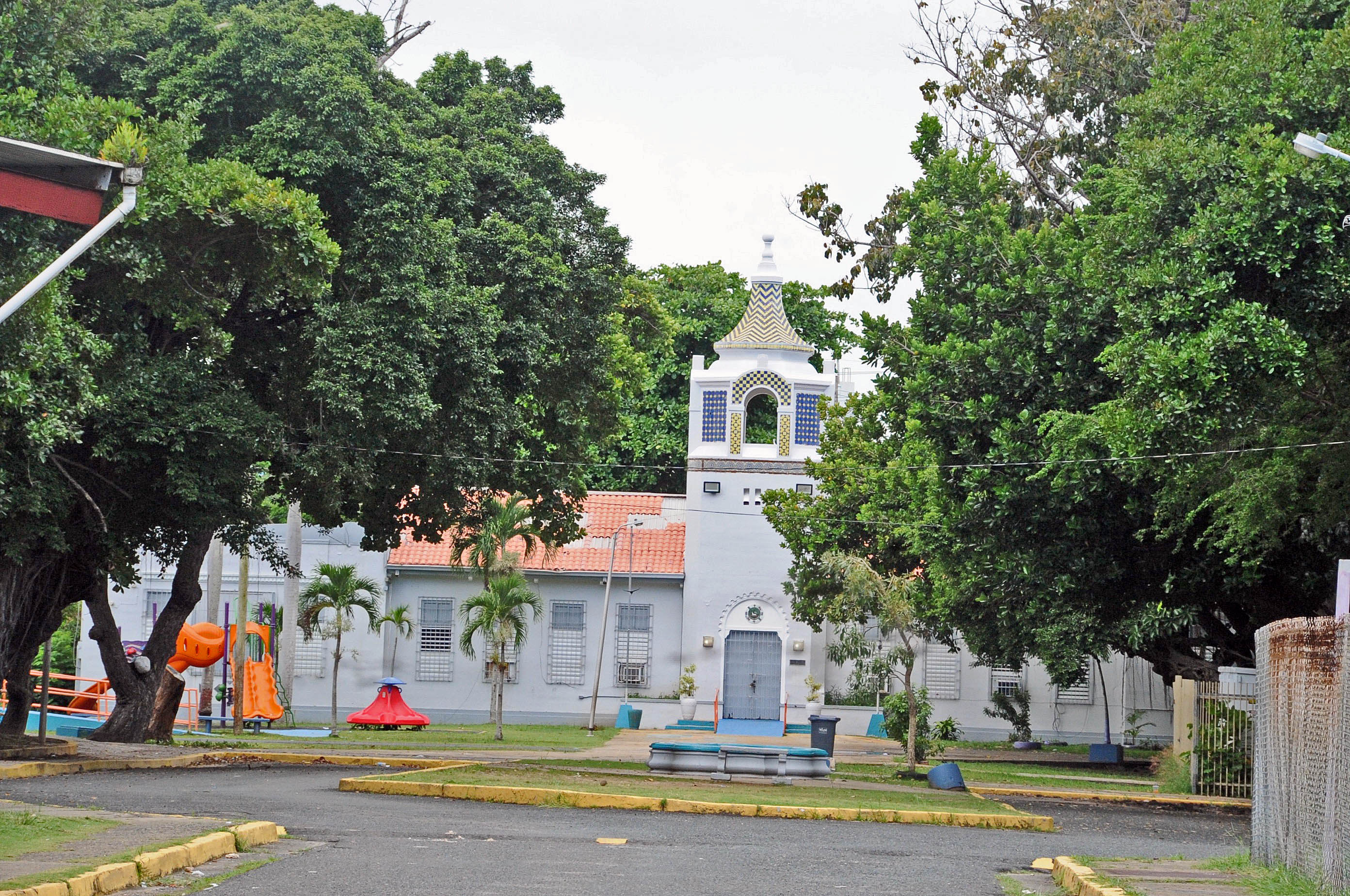
- building in the historic district

- Location within Puerto Rico
- Location: 1312 Avenida Fernández Juncos San Juan, Puerto Rico
- Coordinates: 18°26′50″N 66°04′27″W
- Area: 169,209 sq ft
- Built: 1925
- Architect: Joseph O'Reilly; Manuel L. Miró; Demetrio del Valle
- Architectural style: Mediterranean Revival
- NRHP reference No.: 100002935
- Added to NRHP: October 23, 2018

The Instituto Loaiza Cordero para Niños Ciegos (lit., "Loaiza Cordero Institute for Blind Children"), also known as the Instituto Puertorriqueño para Niños Ciegos (lit., "Puerto Rican Institute for Blind Children"), is a former hospital and school complex for blind children and now a historic district located in the Santurce area of the city of San Juan, Puerto Rico. The historic district is located in a large urban block in the Figueroa subbarrio of Santurce, bound by the Avenida Manuel Fernández Juncos to the northeast, Avenida Hipódromo to the southeast, Las Palmas Street to the southwest and Figueroa Street to the northwest. The historic district was added to the National Register of Historic Places in 2018 due to its historical and architectural significance.

It was designed by architect Joseph O'Reilly who worked closely with Loaiza Cordero herself. The namesake of the institute is Loaiza Cordero del Rosario, a partially blind educator, public servant and poet who was highly involved in the development, construction and management of the site. Native to Yauco, she was part of the first graduate class (1907) of the Normal Industrial School (Escuela Normal Industrial), one of the institutions that would later become the University of Puerto Rico. Loaiza Cordero became a schoolteacher afterwards, an endeavor that was cut short after finding herself partially blind. She was forced to resign from her position but later enrolled at a two-year program at the Perkins Institution for the Blind in Watertown, Massachusetts. This experienced motivated her to resume her education career and to bring education services to children in Puerto Rico. She soon lobbied in the Puerto Rican government for the creation of infrastructure for blind individuals in the island which resulted in the creation of several blind schools throughout the island and the then-called Puerto Rican Institute for Blind Children. The development of the institution was the first of its kind in Puerto Rico and one of the earliest of its kind in the United States that would bring pedagogical, architectural and urban planning ideas together. The complex was design to provide safety, comfort and mobility to blind children, evident in the use of Braille in both Spanish and English throughout the whole site. In addition to Joseph O'Reilly, engineers Manuel L. Miró and Demetrio del Valle were also involved in the construction of the complex according to a dedicative plaque located at the site today.

The Loaiza Cordero Institute historic district designations consists of two contributing buildings (the former hospital and schoolhouse for blind children), a former park and playground also designed for blind children, an allée-like road that transverses the institutes and an ornamental fountain.

== See also ==
- Architecture of Puerto Rico
- Education in Puerto Rico
