= Marcriá =

Studio album by RaiNao
- Released: May 25, 2026
- Genres: Reggaeton; Latin pop; R&B
- Length: 47:47
- Language: Spanish
- Label: Rimas

RaiNao chronology
| Capicú (2024) | Marcriá (2026) |

Singles from Marcriá
- 1. "sofocón" Released: May 7, 2025; 2. "GRIS" Released: May 6, 2026

Marcriá is the second studio album by the Puerto Rican singer RaiNao. It was released on May 25, 2026, through Rimas Entertainment, two years after her debut studio album, Capicú (2024). RaiNao and her principal collaborator Wiso Rivera led its production, working with a rotating group of co-producers. The album features Omara Portuondo, Cultura Profética, Andy Montañez, El Laberinto del Coco, Solo Fernández, and Frido Vargas.

RaiNao conceived Marcriá as a sequence of "sensory treatments" inspired by attending a school for children with visual impairments during her childhood. Its title combines the Spanish word malcriada (a spoiled or ill-mannered woman) with a stylized expression meaning "raised by the sea". Musically, it expands her pop, R&B, and reggaeton foundation through salsa, Latin jazz, bomba, plena, bolero, Brazilian funk, and Cuban guaguancó. The songs follow an emotional progression from infatuation and euphoria toward rejection, anger, and mortality.

The singles "sofocón" and "GRIS" preceded the album, whose visual campaign included color visualizers, song-by-song microstories, and the companion short film Oídos que ven GRIS. RaiNao also promoted it with an NPR Music Tiny Desk Concert. The album received positive reviews from critics, who praised the record's detailed arrangements and its synthesis of contemporary production with Caribbean traditions. It appeared on midyear best-album lists from the Los Angeles Times, The Boston Globe, Rolling Stone en Español, and Variety.

== Background and development ==
RaiNao released her debut studio album, Capicú, in 2024. Its follow-up arrived during a period of wider exposure for her, after she featured on Bad Bunny's "Perfumito Nuevo" from his 2025 album Debí Tirar Más Fotos and performed at several shows during his San Juan concert residency. After completing Capicú, RaiNao initially concentrated on live performance. She later said that this emphasis had disconnected her from purposeful, structured creation, although it also allowed her to recover from the anger and emotional instability she associated with the earlier album. She characterized Marcriá as a more natural product of the personal changes that followed, including the end of unhealthy relationships. She developed the album over approximately two years.

The concept originated in RaiNao's memories of attending a specialized elementary school for children with visual impairments in Santurce, Puerto Rico, where she was one of a small number of sighted pupils. Her mother had enrolled her to take part in the community and assist classmates and teachers.

== Recording and production ==
With one exception, RaiNao wrote or co-wrote and co-produced every track: Frido Vargas wrote and performs "mareo". Wiso Rivera co-produced 15 of the 16 tracks and handled recording and mixing across the album. Numerous producers contributed to individual songs, while Rafferty Santiago shared mixing duties and Colin Leonard mastered the record. RaiNao also played saxophone and percussion.

RaiNao had listened to Omara Portuondo and Andy Montañez since childhood and wanted to preserve their voices within a new project, while Cultura Profética had been a formative influence during her adolescence. After Portuondo's social-media account followed RaiNao, she contacted it with a demo of "dandovueltas...". Portuondo's son invited the production team to Cuba, where they recorded the singer at her home during a period of electrical outages and shortages on the island. RaiNao also set aside complete tracks for emerging acts, continuing a practice from Capicú. "mareo" was Vargas's first released song. RaiNao included it despite reservations from her label because she considered it part of the album's "world."

== Music and lyrics ==
Pitchfork characterized Marcriá as pop and R&B and described it as an expansion of RaiNao's reggaeton-rooted style into salsa, Latin jazz, Brazilian funk, Cuban guaguancó, and bolero. Laia Garcia-Furtado of Harper's Bazaar noted electronic beats, layered choruses, salsa rhythms, plena bass lines, bomba drums and panderos, and jazz passages led by saxophone. RaiNao framed the combination as part of a continuous sensory and emotional journey. She described the sequence as beginning with deception, turning toward dance, euphoria, and the desire for love, and then descending into rejection, repetition, anger, and death.

Apple Music characterized the opening "teaser", which introduces the brighter part of the emotional arc, as atmospheric perreo. "GRIS", one of only two tracks written before the album's concept was established, was produced by RaiNao, Tainy, Koji Kose, and Rivera and includes a tranquil handpan part. RaiNao had sent the song to Tainy for possible use by another artist but reclaimed it while structuring Marcriá, believing that no other song represented water as effectively. The arrangement of "(toco madera y te beso)" develops sparse congas and cuíca into a mixture of cuatro and salsa piano, while "mariposas en el estómago" pairs El Laberinto del Coco's percussion with bomba-influenced funk. "sofocón" combines RaiNao's vocals with bomba percussion and lyrics that refer to Lajas and La Parguera.

Near the end, "cántaro" turns the record toward mortality. RaiNao based its brass arrangement on a vocal sample and recorded her saxophone for one of her own projects for the first time; the instrumentation also includes bassoon, harp, trombone, and a plena tumbadero. Montañez sings a traditional chorus commonly associated with bomba musician Félix Alduén, although RaiNao noted that its authorship may predate him. The song applies the literary concept of the death of the author to releasing an album: once listeners receive the work, its meaning no longer belongs exclusively to its creator. The closing title track incorporates RaiNao's recitation of a poem by Puerto Rican poet Angelamaría Dávila from her 1966 collection Homenaje al ombligo. RaiNao had considered adapting the poem into an interlude called "Garabato", but retained it in fuller form after deciding that it summarized the project.

== Release and promotion ==
RaiNao performed "sofocón" for the German performance platform ColorsxStudios on April 28, 2025. Rimas released its studio version as the album's first single on May 7.

The second single, "GRIS", followed on May 6, 2026. On May 20, RaiNao made her debut on NPR Music's Tiny Desk Concert series. The ensemble performed without a conventional drum kit, using Puerto Rican percussion and arrangements that crossed jazz, R&B, bomba, plena, salsa, and reggaeton; the set included "dandovueltas..." five days before the album's release. Rimas released the 16-track album digitally on May 25.

== Critical reception ==
Professional ratings
Review scores
| Source | Rating |
|---|---|
| Maxazine | 8/10 |
| Pitchfork | 8.0/10 |

Marcriá received generally positive reviews from music critics. Tatiana Lee Rodriguez of Pitchfork called it an immersive expansion of RaiNao's alternative sound and praised both its thematic range and compositional precision. She found the arrangements unusually detailed for contemporary urbano, identifying "(toco madera y te beso)" and "mariposas en el estómago" as particular examples of the record's collaborative instrumentation.

For JazzTimes, A. D. Amorosi characterized the album as intimate and idiosyncratic jazz shaped by what he called space-reggaeton. He contrasted the samba and bossa nova-influenced "sofocón" and "dandovueltas..." with the busier backgrounds of "ODIO A TU NOVIA" and "cántaro". Jan Vranken of Maxazine likewise praised the cohesion of the guaguancó, bomba, jazz, and reggaeton elements. He singled out "dandovueltas..." as the highlight and used "tornasol" to illustrate the album's modern production, ultimately calling Marcriá the strongest Latin American album released in 2026 up to that point.

In midyear commentary, Jem Aswad of Variety compared the album's ambition and multi-genre construction to Rosalía's Motomami, while distinguishing Marcriá as a less confrontational synthesis of Caribbean traditions and electronic production. Noah Schaffer of The Boston Globe highlighted its emotional directness, textures, colors, and placement of veteran collaborators in unfamiliar settings.

=== Accolades ===
Midyear lists
| Publication | List | Rank | Ref. |
|---|---|---|---|
| The Boston Globe | The 20 Best Albums of 2026 (So Far) | Unranked | |
| Los Angeles Times (De Los) | Latin Albums You Need to Hear | Unranked | |
| Rolling Stone en Español | Best Albums of 2026 So Far | 27 | |
| Variety | Best Albums of 2026 So Far | Unranked | |

== Track listing ==
Credits adapted from Qobuz and Apple Music.

Marcriá track listing
| No. | Title | Writer(s) | Producer(s) | Length |
|---|---|---|---|---|
| 1. | "teaser" | Naomi Ramírez Rivera (RaiNao) | RaiNao; Wiso Rivera | 2:12 |
| 2. | "GRIS" | Ramírez | RaiNao; Tainy; Rivera; Koji Kose | 3:01 |
| 3. | "(toco madera y te beso)" | Ramírez | RaiNao; Slow Jamz; Rivera; Ailish F. Quiñones | 3:10 |
| 4. | "mariposas en el estómago" (featuring El Laberinto del Coco) | Ramírez; Héctor Barez | RaiNao; Barez; Rivera; Barba Blanca; Frido Vargas | 3:40 |
| 5. | "sofocón" | Ramírez | RaiNao; Rivera; David B; Orteez; Noize | 2:26 |
| 6. | "dandovueltasdandovueltasdandovueltasdandovueltasdandovueltasdandovueltasdandovueltasdandovueltasdandovueltasdandovueltasdandovueltasdandovueltas" (featuring Omara Portuondo) | Ramírez | RaiNao; Rivera; Barba Blanca | 3:24 |
| 7. | "dame la verde" (featuring Cultura Profética) | Ramírez; Willy Rodríguez | RaiNao; Rivera; Brandon Cores; Vargas; Gabo Lugo | 4:17 |
| 8. | "mareo" (performed by Frido Vargas) | Frido Vargas | Vargas; Cores | 2:48 |
| 9. | "へ( •́ ‸ •̀) ʋ" | Ramírez; Vargas | RaiNao; Vargas; Rivera | 1:00 |
| 10. | "track5" | Ramírez | RaiNao; Rivera; Jomar Santana; Quimera Music | 3:00 |
| 11. | "tornasol" (featuring Solo Fernández) | Ramírez; Giancarlo Rojas | RaiNao; Rojas; Rivera; Ricardo Montilla; Freddy Nuñez | 3:01 |
| 12. | "ODIO A TU NOVIA" | Ramírez | RaiNao; Rivera; Jota Rosa; Albert Hype; Taiko | 4:36 |
| 13. | "Chamberi" | Ramírez | RaiNao; Rivera; Cores; Giova de las Águilas | 3:06 |
| 14. | "ε=┌(;・_・)┘" | Ramírez | RaiNao; Rivera; Giova de las Águilas; Barba Blanca | 1:53 |
| 15. | "cántaro" (featuring Andy Montañez) | Ramírez | RaiNao; Rivera; Jota Rosa; Albert Hype; Taiko | 3:21 |
| 16. | "Marcriá" | Ramírez | RaiNao; Rivera | 2:52 |
| Total length: | | | | 47:47 |

Notes

- The title of track 6 repeats "dandovueltas" twelve times; it is abbreviated as "dandovueltas...".
- "cántaro" incorporates a traditional chorus associated with Félix Alduén.
- "Marcriá" incorporates a recitation from Dávila's Homenaje al ombligo.

== Personnel ==
Credits are adapted from Qobuz, the Los Angeles Times, and El Nuevo Día.

=== Musicians ===
- RaiNao – lead vocals (tracks 1–7 and 9–16), saxophone (track 15), percussion
- El Laberinto del Coco – featured performer (track 4)
- Omara Portuondo – featured vocals (track 6)
- Cultura Profética – featured performer (track 7)
- Frido Vargas – lead vocals (track 8)
- Solo Fernández – featured performer (track 11)
- Andy Montañez – featured vocals (track 15)
- Luis "Lagarto" Figueroa – tumbadero (track 15)

=== Technical ===
- Wiso Rivera – recording, mixing
- Rafferty Santiago – mixing; surround mixing (track 6)
- Colin Leonard – mastering
- Edgar Segarra – recording (track 8)
- Giancarlo Rojas – recording (track 11)
- Emanuel Santana – additional recording (track 15)
