= RaiNao =

Puerto Rican singer-songwriter (born 1994)

- Born: Naomi Ramírez Rivera; May 26, 1994 (age 32); Santurce, San Juan, Puerto Rico
- Occupations: Singer; songwriter; record producer
- Years active: 2020–present
- Musical career
- Genres: Reggaeton; alternative reggaeton; Dominican dembow; R&B; Latin hip-hop; Latin trap; Latin pop; Bomba; Plena; Bolero; Salsa; Bachata; Afrobeats
- Instrument: Vocals • saxophone
- Label: Rimas
- Website: mejorainao.com

Naomi Ramírez Rivera (born May 26, 1994), known professionally as RaiNao, is a Puerto Rican singer-songwriter. Based in Santurce, San Juan, Puerto Rico, her music incorporates elements of reggaeton, jazz, R&B, and alternative pop, shaped by her background in music theory and live performance. She got signed to Rimas Entertainment in 2024.

== Early life and education ==
Naomi Ramírez was born and raised in Santurce, San Juan, Puerto Rico. Her father, a vocalist in salsa bands, including Pete "El Conde" Rodríguez's ensemble, introduced her to music from an early age. Despite her musical upbringing, she focused on the saxophone rather than singing, enrolling in the Escuela Libre de Música to study music theory and instrumental performance.

During her teenage years, Ramírez experienced anxiety and panic attacks, once requiring hospitalization during a mental health crisis. These challenges contributed to her initial hesitation to pursue music as a career.

Ramírez attended the University of Puerto Rico, where she initially pursued a biology major with aspirations of becoming a surgeon. After encountering academic challenges, she switched to theater arts and audiovisual production in 2014. She is queer.

== Career ==
RaiNao began her professional music career in 2020, uploading a reggae-infused cover of Víctor Manuelle's "He Tratado" to YouTube. Before embarking on a solo career, she toured as a backup vocalist for fellow Puerto Rican musician Rafa Pabön for four years, which helped her overcome stage fright and refine her vocal abilities.

Her debut EP, ahora A.K.A. Nao, was released in 2022 under Rimas Entertainment's independent-focused label, Sonar. The EP included tracks such as "Plug" and "Un Amarre" and featured experimental approaches to urbano and alternative genres. Bad Bunny highlighted her track "LUV", which led to her performing at one of his concerts during the Un Verano Sin Ti tour in San Juan, Puerto Rico.

In 2023, RaiNao performed at the South by Southwest music festival in Austin, Texas. She contributed to Mora's album Estrella, appearing on two tracks.

Her debut album, Capicú, was released in February 2024, blending reggaeton, jazz, R&B, and other genres. It featured experimental elements such as live horns and percussive rhythms and included songs like "Roadhead" and "Naomi's Interlude". That year, she performed at Ceremonia and Baja Beach Fest, marking another milestones in her career.

RaiNao featured on the Bad Bunny song "Perfumito Nuevo" on his sixth album Debí Tirar Más Fotos, released on 5 January 2025. She starred in the 2026 video game Grand Theft Auto VI as the radio host of Cocoteo FM.

== Artistry ==
Ramírez's music is defined by its genre-blending style, incorporating elements of reggaeton, jazz, R&B, drum and bass, and alternative pop. Her background as a saxophonist influences her use of live instrumentation, and her lyrics often explore themes of self-expression, vulnerability, and empowerment.

Ramírez avoids trends in favor of creating music that reflects her personal experiences and artistic vision. Writing lyrics is a central part of her process, which she describes as a way to communicate uniquely.

Her stage name, RaiNao, originated as an evolution of her nickname "Nao" and became part of her artistic identity as she embraced music as her "life project".

== Discography ==
=== Albums ===
- Capicú (2024)
- Marcriá (2026)

=== EPs ===
- ahora A.K.A. Nao (2022)

=== Selected songs ===
- "He Tratado" (2020)
- "Me Fui" (2021)
- "LUV" (2022)
- "Plug" (2022)
- "Un Amarre" (2022)
- "Roadhead" (2024)
- "Naomi's Interlude" (2024)
