= Figueroa (disambiguation) =

Figueroa is a Spanish surname.

Figueroa may also refer to:

== Places ==
- Figueroa (Santurce), a subbarrio in San Juan, Puerto Rico
- Figueroa Department of Argentina
- Figueroa Mountain in the U.S. state of California

== Other uses ==
- Alférez FAP David Figueroa Fernandini Airport, airport serving Huanuco, Peru
- Figueroa Street, 30-mile long street in Los Angeles, California
- Figueroa Street Tunnels, series of tunnels on the Pasadena Freeway in Los Angeles, California
- Figueroa v. Canada, Canadian Supreme Court case involving the rights of political parties
