= Puerto Rico Highway 39 =

Highway in Puerto Rico

Highway 39
- Ruta 39
- Calle Cerra

Route information
- Maintained by Puerto Rico DTPW
- Length: 0.9 km (0.56 mi; 3,000 ft)

Major junctions
- South end: PR-1 in Santurce
- PR-42 in Santurce; PR-35 in Santurce
- North end: PR-25 in Santurce

Location
- Country: United States
- Territory: Puerto Rico
- Municipalities: San Juan

Highway system
- Roads in Puerto Rico; List
← PR-38	→ PR-40

Puerto Rico Highway 39 (PR-39) is an urban road in Santurce. This is a short road that connects from the PR-1 (Expreso Luis Muñoz Rivera) to PR-26 (Expreso Román Baldorioty de Castro) and is parallel to PR-2. This road intersects with PR-35 (Avenida Manuel Fernández Juncos) and PR-25 (Avenida Juan Ponce de León). This road is called Calle Cerra.

== Major intersections ==
The entire route is located in Santurce, San Juan.

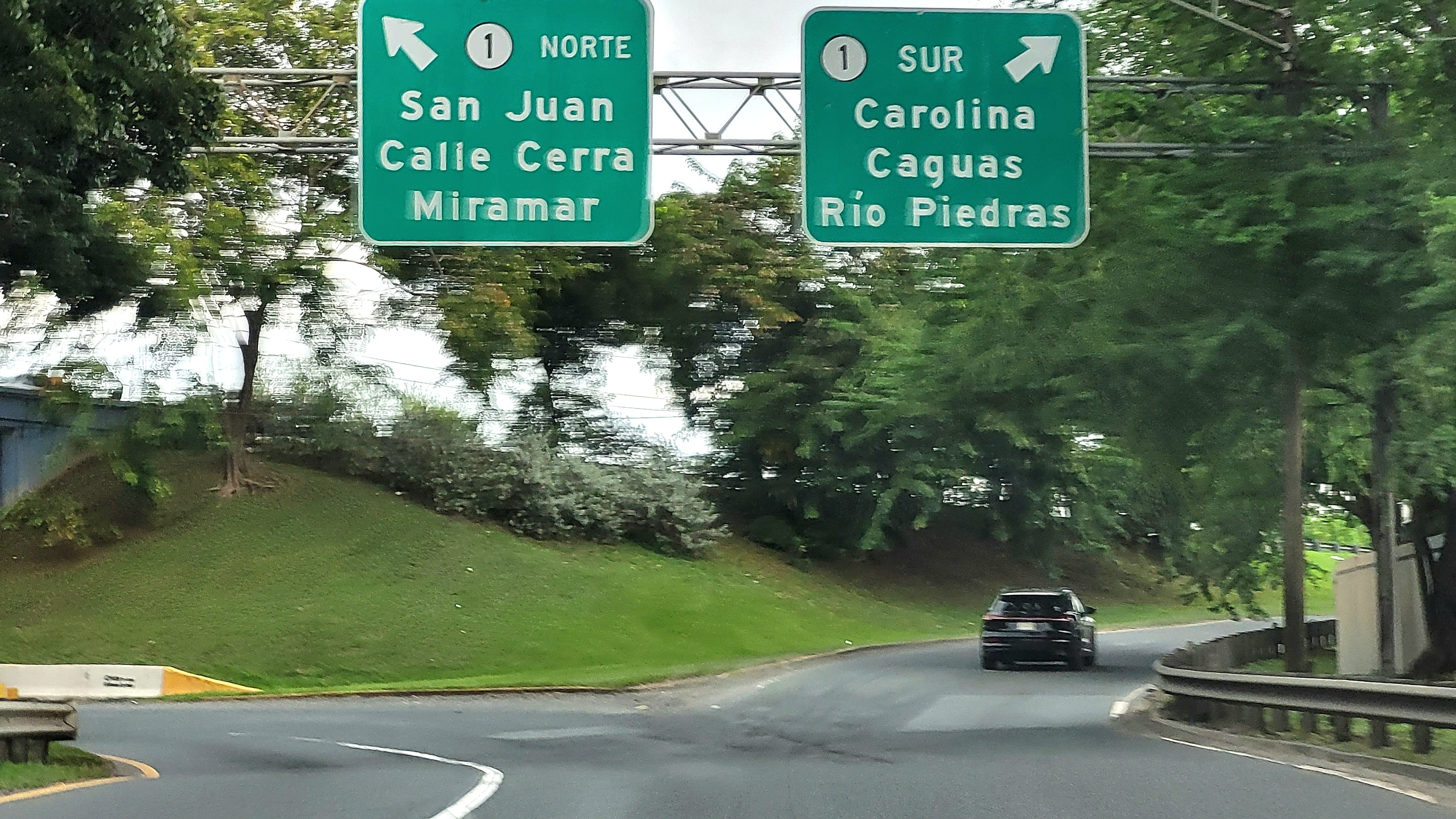
Traffic sign for Calle Cerra (PR-39) from PR-2 eastbound exit at PR-1/PR-2 interchange

km	mi	Destinations	Notes
0.9	0.56	PR-1 north (Expreso Luis Muñoz Rivera) to PR-2 west (Expreso John F. Kennedy) – San Juan, Miramar, Bayamón, Guaynabo	Southern terminus of PR-39; northbound exit and entrance; no access to PR-2 eastbound
0.6– 0.5	0.37– 0.31	PR-42 (Calle Las Palmas) – Santurce	
0.3– 0.2	0.19– 0.12	PR-35 (Avenida Manuel Fernández Juncos) – San Juan, Hato Rey	One-way street
0.0	0.0	PR-25 (Avenida Juan Ponce de León) – San Juan, Miramar	Northern terminus of PR-39; one-way street
1.000 mi = 1.609 km; 1.000 km = 0.621 mi: Incomplete access
