= Rosarito =

- City
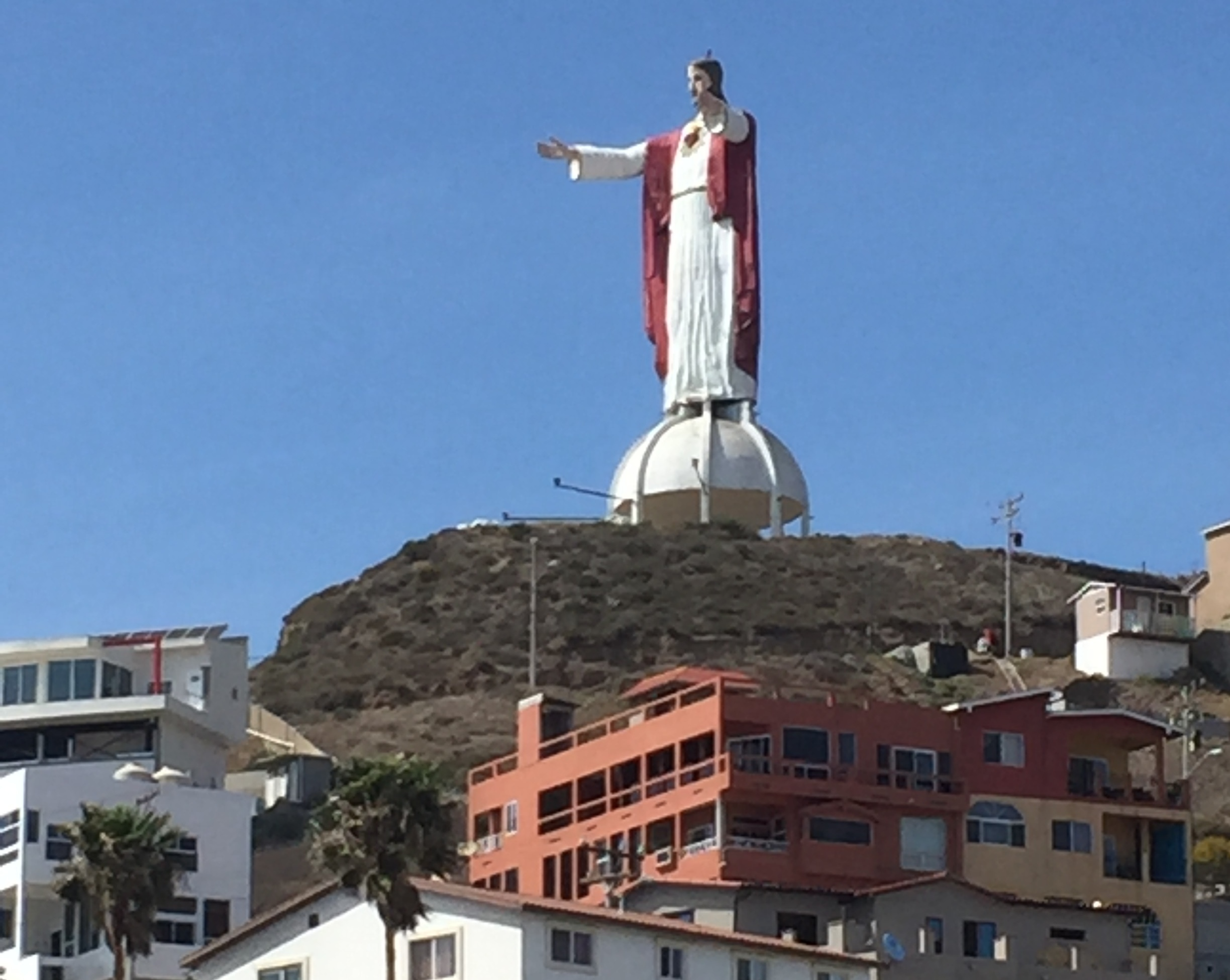
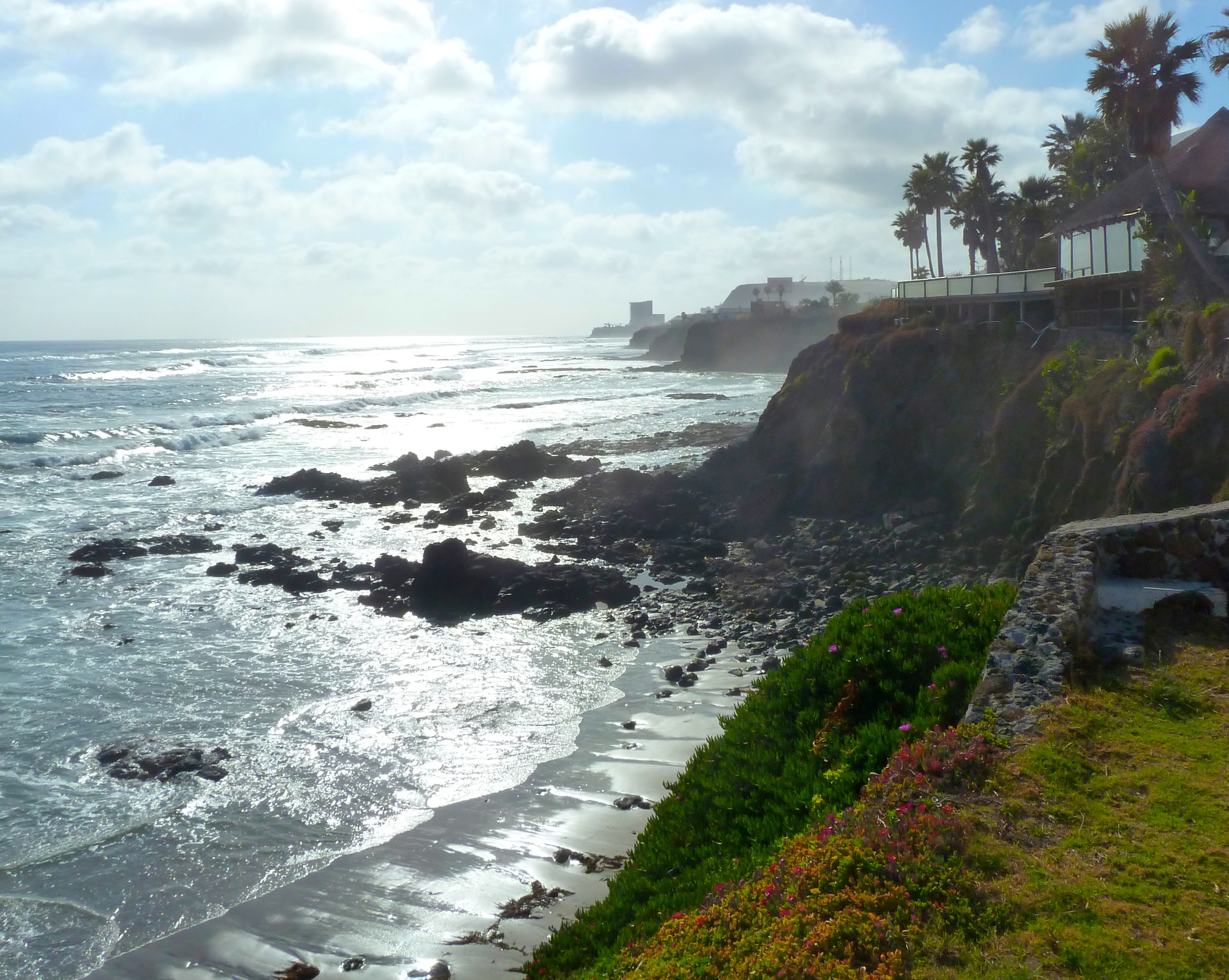
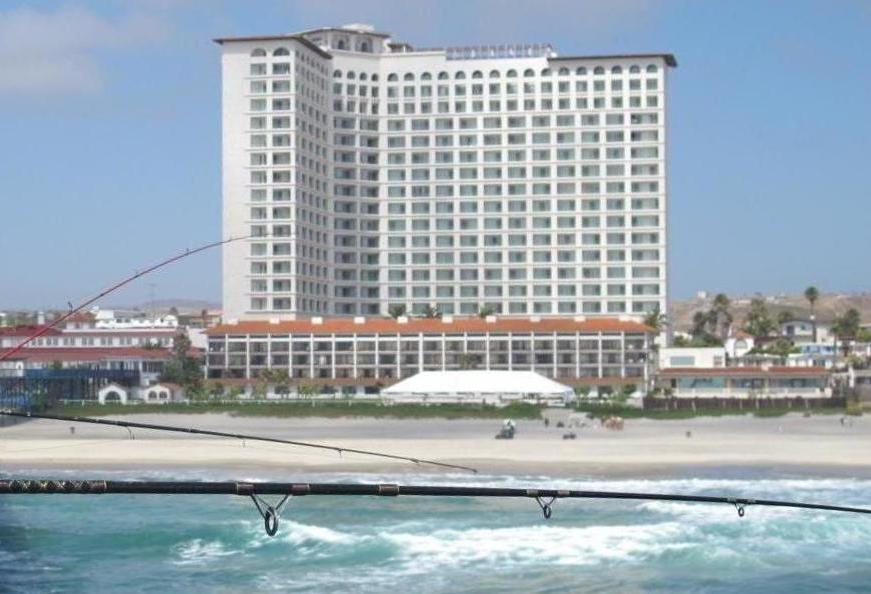
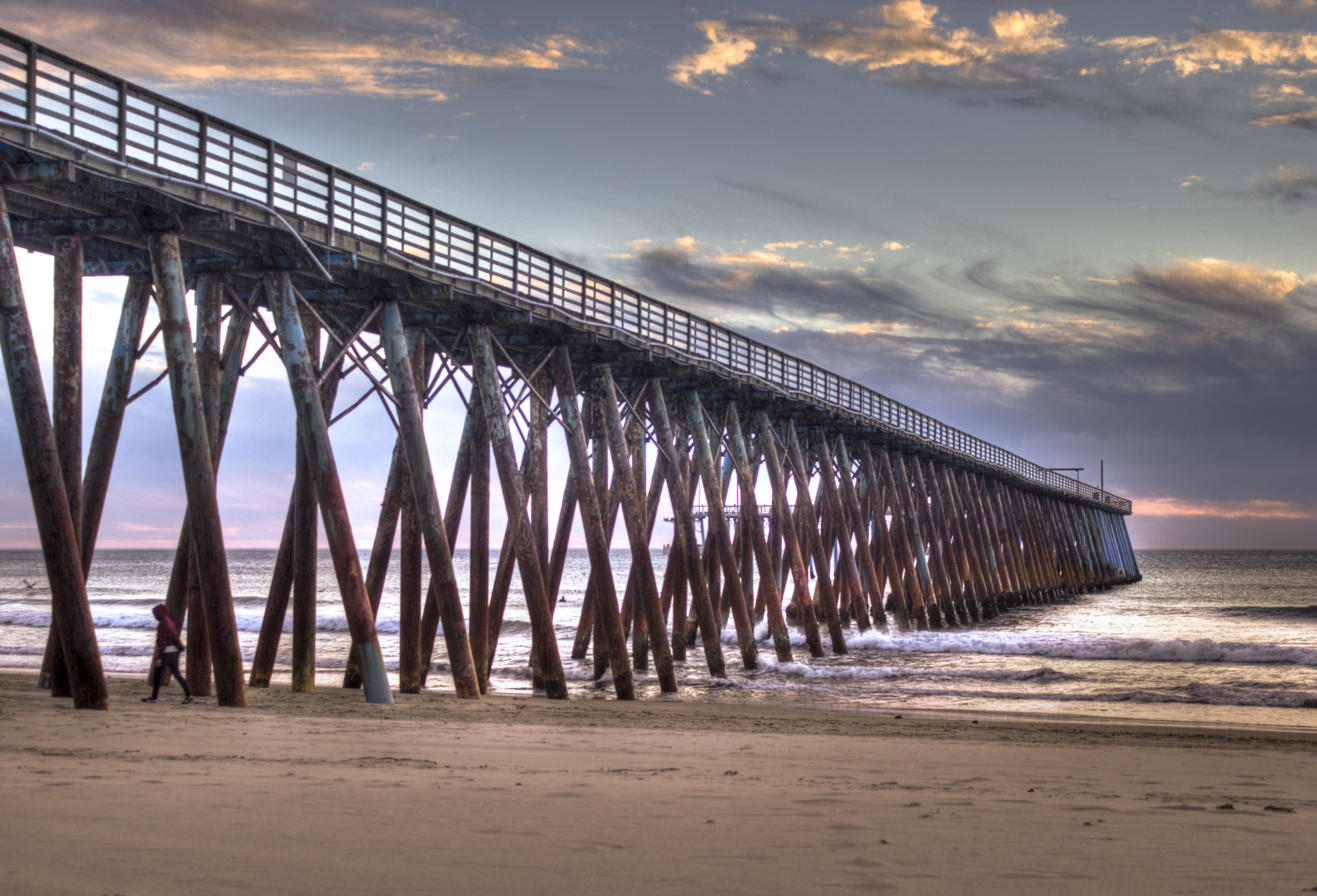
- Top: Cristo del Sagrado Corazón statue (left) and Rosarito's Pacific Coast; bottom: Rosarito Beach Hotel (left) and the Muelle de Rosarito (right).

- Coat of arms
- Motto: A Horizon of Possibilities
- Location of Rosarito in Baja California
- Interactive map of Rosarito
- Location of Rosarito in Mexico
- Coordinates: 32°20′32″N 117°3′22″W
- Country: Mexico
- State: Baja California
- Municipality: Playas de Rosarito
- Municipality established: June 29, 1995

Area
  - Total: 35.71 km^{2} (13.79 sq mi)
- Elevation: 14 m (46 ft)

Population (2020 census)
  - Total: 100,660
  - Density: 2,819/km^{2} (7,301/sq mi)
- Time zone: UTC−08:00 (Zona Noroeste)
  - Summer (DST): UTC−07:00 (DST)
- Area code: +52 661
- Website: rosarito.gob.mx
- Sources: (in Spanish) INEGI, Enciclopedia de los Municipios de México

Rosarito is a coastal city in Playas de Rosarito Municipality, Baja California, on the Pacific Coast of Mexico. As of 2010, the city had a population of 65,278. Located 10 miles (16 km) south of the US–Mexico border, Rosarito is a part of the greater San Diego–Tijuana region and one of the westernmost cities in Mexico. Rosarito is a major tourist destination, known for its beaches, resorts, and events like the Baja Beach Fest.

== History ==
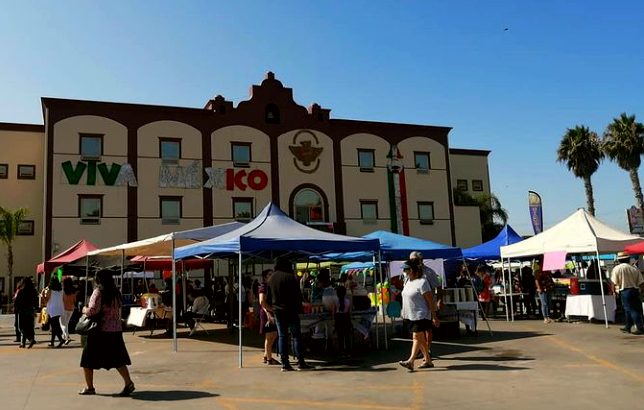
The Casa Municipal (Municipal Hall) of Playas de Rosarito Municipality.

Evidence of the presence of Paleo-Indians in the region has been dated as early as 2,000 BC. By 1,000 BC, a group emerged that is recognizable as the Yuman ancestors of the Kumeyaay, who continued to inhabit the northern portion of the Baja California Peninsula at the time of European contact. The Kumeyaay referred to the area now known as Rosarito as Wa-cuatay, which translates to "big houses" in the Kumeyaay language.

=== Spanish era ===
After conquering the Aztec Empire, Hernán Cortés sent expeditions to explore what he believed to be the Island of California. In 1533, mutineer Fortún Ximénez was the first European to land in Baja California, at La Paz, Baja California Sur. In September 1542, Juan Rodríguez Cabrillo passed through the Rosarito area on his way from Ensenada to San Diego Bay. The year of 1697 saw the establishment of the first permanent European settlement in Baja California in a Jesuit mission at Loreto. Rosarito would soon be caught in a power struggle between Jesuits, Dominicans, and Franciscan friars for decades.

In 1773, a frontier was defined separating Nueva ("new") or Alta ("upper") California, under the jurisdiction of the Franciscans, from Antigua ("old") or Baja ("lower") California, which was entrusted to the Dominicans. In 1788, Luis de Sales, a Dominican priest, redrew the boundary, extending Baja California to the Rosarito Arroyo, known at the time as the Barrabas Arroyo.

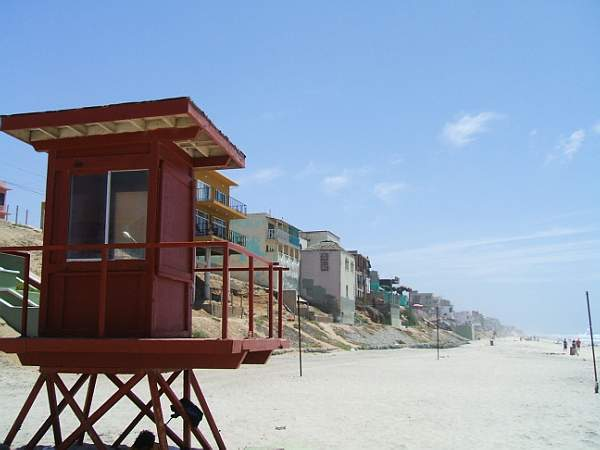
Lifeguard station and beach houses in Rosarito

Because Mission San Miguel, 13 km (8.1 mi) to the south, was frequently flooded by the Río Guadalupe, Dominican missionary Tomás de Ahumada sought another site on higher ground for at El Descanso. Additional advantages of the northerly location were good grazing and plentiful arable land. In 1817, Ahumada founded the Misión El Descanso or Misión San Miguel la Nueva among the Kumeyaay people 22 km (14 mi) to the south of the present-day Rosarito.

=== Rancho era ===
The property of Rancho El Rosario, granted by José María de Echeandía in 1827 to Don José Manuel Machado, one of the first soldiers stationed at the Presidio of San Diego, was the first ranch in the modern-day Rosarito region. The 11 league rancho was bounded on the north by Rancho Tía Juana, on the west by the Pacific Ocean and on the south by public lands.

In 1830, Father Félix Caballero constructed an adobe church here and managed both missions from El Descanso, but in 1834, it ceased to function as a mission. At the time it had a population of just 254, including those from Mission San Miguel. By 1853 the mission was deserted. Ruins of Misión El Descanso remain within the community of El Descanso.

José Manuel Machado's son, Don Joaquín Machado, applied for title to the land as Rancho Rosarito to President Porfirio Díaz. On May 14, 1885, Machado received his title and registered it in Ensenada, then the capital city of the Northern District of Baja California Territory. May 14 is now recognized and celebrated as Rosarito's Foundation Day by the Historical Society of Rosarito.

=== Modern era ===
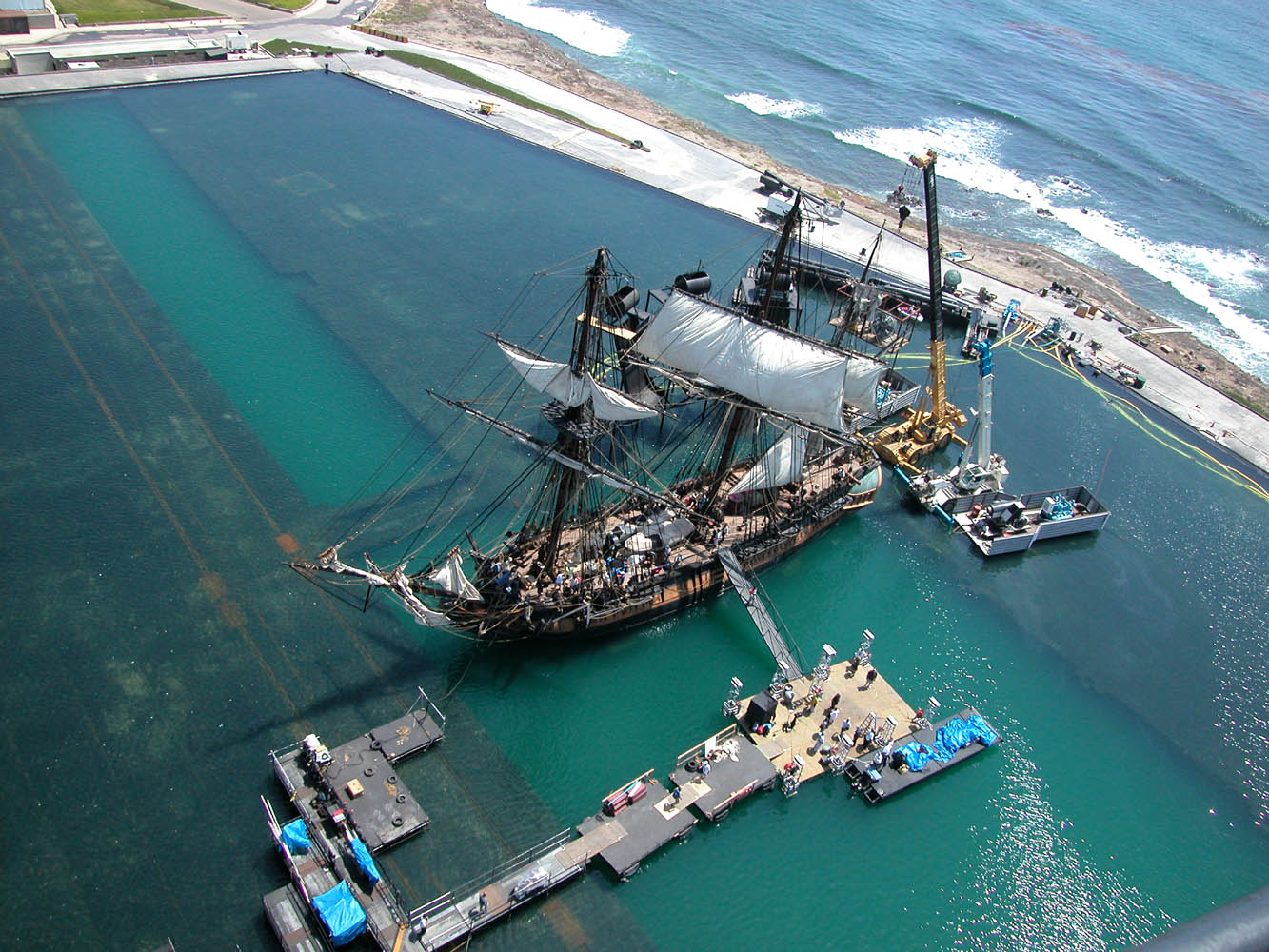
Baja Studios is the world's largest water stage and filming set, used in films such as Titanic.

On December 1, 1995, Rosarito was converted from a suburb of Tijuana to an independent city.

Playas de Rosarito lies on the coast of the Pacific Ocean on the North Baja California Peninsula. The city is positioned between the foothills of the Peninsular Ranges and the ocean. It maintains a relatively uniform topography and displays few variances in terrain.

Urbanization in 1950 marked the beginning of Rosarito's contemporary-era development as planning and construction of streets and city blocks took place. As land sales soared, coupled with the construction of small restaurants, some shops and two hotels, the city began to take shape its present-day appearance. In the 1960s, Playas de Rosarito entered the commercial and industrial era with the constructions of a large thermoelectric power plant and the later installations of Pemex, the state-owned petroleum company.

The city maintains luxury resorts that take the form of skyscrapers on its coast. The majority of these buildings are located on Boulevard Benito Juárez, also the city's main Boulevard. Residential and commercial highrises continue to go up along the coast, towards both Tijuana and Ensenada.

== Geography ==
=== Climate ===
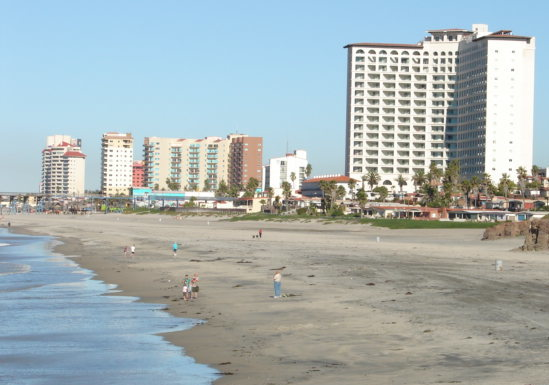
Hotels along the Pacific Coast.

Rosarito has a semi-arid climate with Mediterranean-like precipitation patterns (Köppen climate classification BSh/BSk). The climate is strongly influenced by the cold California Current and, as a result, temperatures are mild throughout the year with average temperatures ranging between 14.3 and 20.9 °C (57.7 and 69.6 °F).

The average annual precipitation is 261 mm (10 in), most of it being concentrated in the winter months. The wettest month is March with 57 mm (2 in) while the driest month is July. It has cool winters with an average temperature of 14.3 °C (57.7 °F) in February and March, and warm summers with an average temperature of 20.9 °C (69.6 °F) in August.

On December 16, 2008, the city center was flooded by heavy rains.

Climate data for Rosarito
Month	Jan	Feb	Mar	Apr	May	Jun	Jul	Aug	Sep	Oct	Nov	Dec	Year
Record high °C (°F)	33.5 (92.3)	32.5 (90.5)	31.5 (88.7)	31.0 (87.8)	34.5 (94.1)	40.0 (104.0)	32.0 (89.6)	34.0 (93.2)	41.5 (106.7)	38.0 (100.4)	36.5 (97.7)	31.5 (88.7)	41.5 (106.7)
Mean daily maximum °C (°F)	19.1 (66.4)	19.0 (66.2)	18.6 (65.5)	19.7 (67.5)	20.6 (69.1)	21.8 (71.2)	23.2 (73.8)	24.9 (76.8)	24.2 (75.6)	23.3 (73.9)	21.3 (70.3)	19.6 (67.3)	21.3 (70.3)
Daily mean °C (°F)	14.5 (58.1)	14.3 (57.7)	14.3 (57.7)	15.3 (59.5)	16.6 (61.9)	18.1 (64.6)	19.5 (67.1)	20.9 (69.6)	20.1 (68.2)	19.0 (66.2)	16.6 (61.9)	14.9 (58.8)	17.0 (62.6)
Mean daily minimum °C (°F)	9.8 (49.6)	9.6 (49.3)	9.9 (49.8)	11.0 (51.8)	12.6 (54.7)	14.4 (57.9)	15.9 (60.6)	16.9 (62.4)	16.0 (60.8)	14.6 (58.3)	11.9 (53.4)	10.3 (50.5)	12.7 (54.9)
Record low °C (°F)	2.0 (35.6)	2.0 (35.6)	1.0 (33.8)	2.0 (35.6)	7.0 (44.6)	10.0 (50.0)	10.0 (50.0)	10.0 (50.0)	9.0 (48.2)	6.0 (42.8)	0.0 (32.0)	1.5 (34.7)	0.0 (32.0)
Average precipitation mm (inches)	50.5 (1.99)	52.4 (2.06)	56.5 (2.22)	17.3 (0.68)	7.6 (0.30)	1.1 (0.04)	0.0 (0.0)	2.2 (0.09)	6.1 (0.24)	9.6 (0.38)	27.1 (1.07)	30.3 (1.19)	260.7 (10.26)
Average precipitation days (≥ 0.1 mm)	5.5	5.7	6.9	3.3	2.0	0.6	0.0	0.5	1.2	2.0	3.6	4.1	35.4
Source: Servicio Meteorológico Nacional

== Culture ==
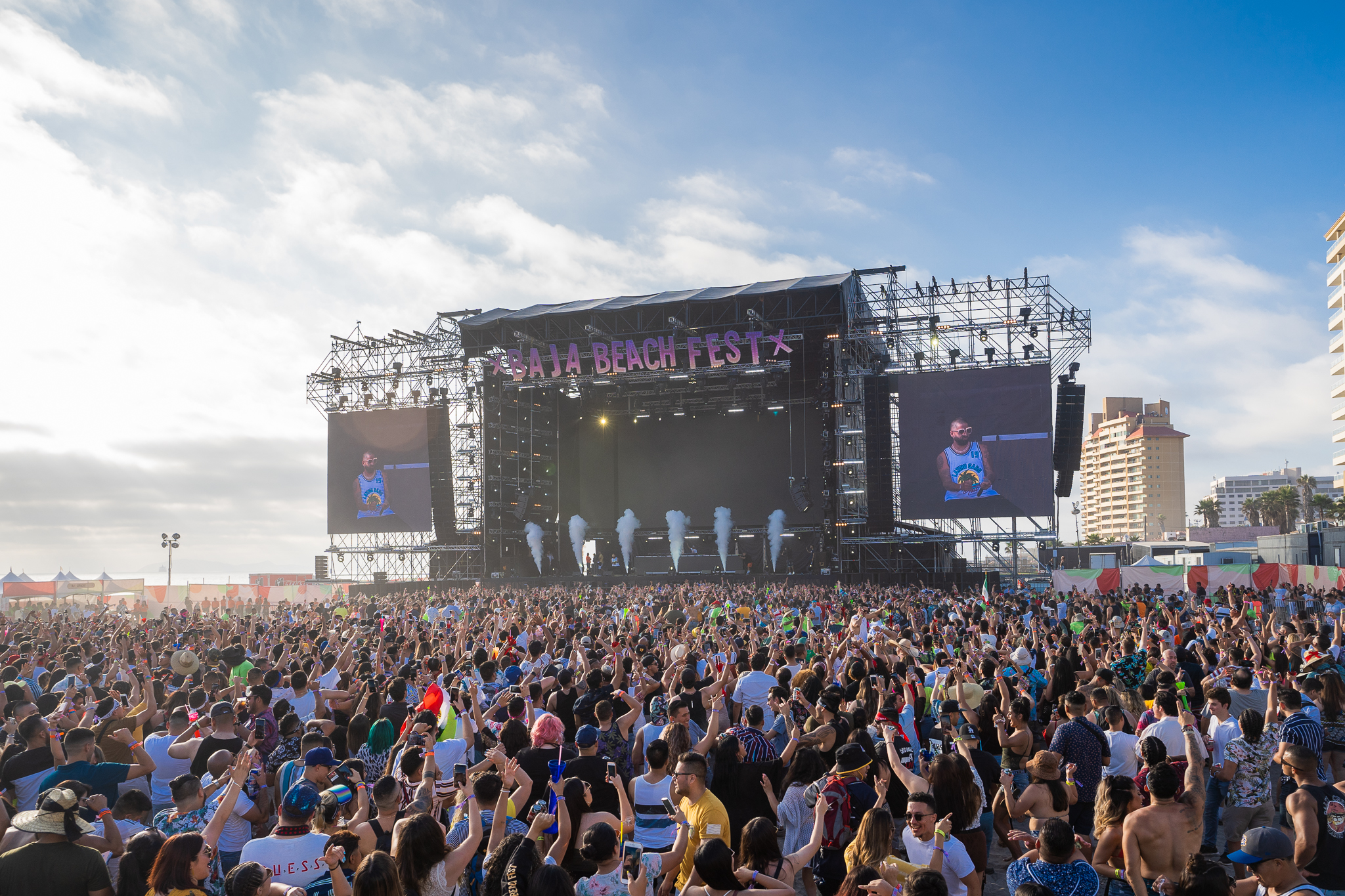
Baja Beach Fest is a major reggaetón music festival, featuring artists like Bad Bunny and J Balvin.

Rosarito has historically been centered on tourism. It began with the Ortiz family's establishment of Rene's (Bar, Restaurant, Trailer Park and Motel) in 1925. Rene served his town holding the position Delegado (Mayor) more than any other politician in Rosarito. Rene, a prominent businessman, helped create Rosarito from a ranch to a town which later became a city. When Rene was not able to serve his people any longer he chose as his successor Hugo Torres Chabert, a friend and owner of Hotel Rosarito.

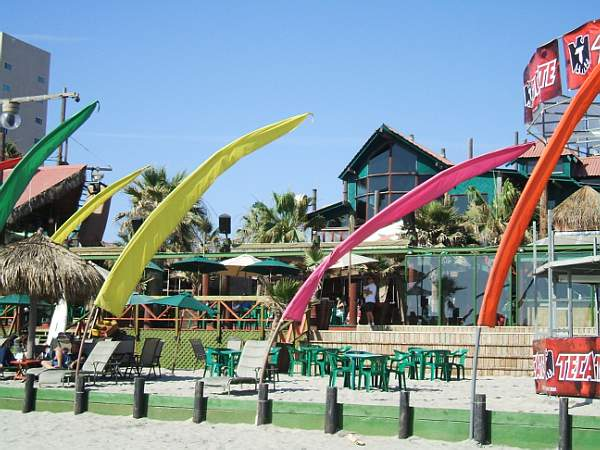
Restaurants on a beach.

While Prohibition was the law of the land, many U.S. residents began to cross the border into Mexico, where drinking was still legal. Tijuana seemed to attract a more speakeasy-oriented clientele, and Rosarito became a haven for the more well-heeled and Hollywood set. Rosarito was visited by Hollywood film stars such as Orson Welles and Dolores del Río who were attracted by hunting (deer, quail and rabbit) and fishing (lobster, abalone). While Rita Hayworth was married to Prince Aly Khan, son of Aga Khan III, the two would visit the Rosarito Beach Hotel, take over an entire floor, and bring their own staff, including a personal chef. Other Hollywood visitors included Mickey Rooney, Ava Gardner, Spencer Tracy and Katharine Hepburn.

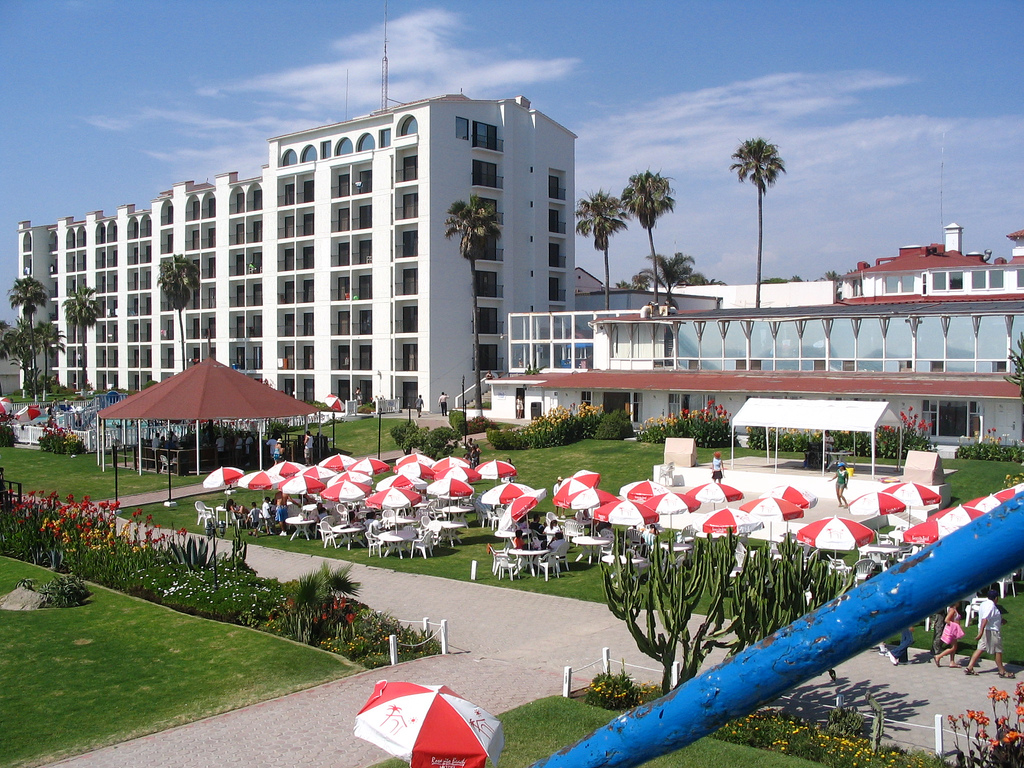
Rosarito is one of Baja California's most popular tourist destinations.

A descendant of Maria Luisa Chabert Uriarte, the young wife of Manuel P. Barbachano the founder of Rosarito Beach Hotel, her nephew Hugo Torres Chabert led the drive to incorporate the city in 1995, and was appointed to a three-year term as Mayor. In 2007, Torres Chabert ran for election and was overwhelmingly elected to a new three-year term. The subject of rising crime rates and police corruption were major issues in the campaign. Torres Chabert, as owner of the Rosarito Beach Hotel, was deeply concerned about the safety of tourists, and pledged strong action to deal with both issues. In early 2008, both federal and state police were ordered into the city (along with neighboring Tijuana) to reinforce the city's efforts.

Rosarito was the source of rocks for the Pet Rock collectible of the 1970s.

In September 1996, James Cameron's production team moved to the newly built Fox Baja Studios in Rosarito, where a full scale RMS Titanic had been constructed for the 1997 film, in which Fox acquired 40 acres (16 ha) of waterfront south of Rosarito. Some scenes for the movie Deep Blue Sea were also filmed here too, in the same studio as Titanic.

== Transportation ==
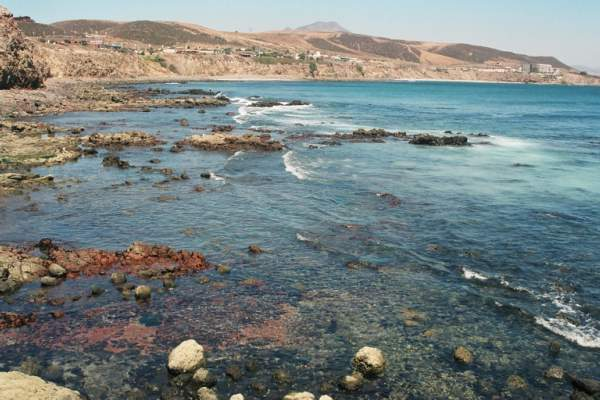
Highway 1 and Highway 1D connect Rosarito to the rest of Baja California along the Pacific coastline.

Mexican Federal Highway 1 and tollway 1D connect Rosarito with western and Downtown Tijuana to the north and Ensenada to the south.

The Corredor Tijuana-Rosarito 2000 freeway connects Rosarito with the Mesa de Otay area of northeast Tijuana and the Otay Mesa Port of Entry to the United States.

== Education ==
Rosarito hosts a branch of the Autonomous University of Baja California, offering bachelor's degree in Administration and Public Accounting, Social Sciences and Humanities, Commerce and International Relations, Communication, Journalism, Education and Pedagogy, Engineering and Technology, Psychology, and Social Sciences of Behavior.
