= Misión El Descanso =

19th century Dominican mission in Baja California, Mexico

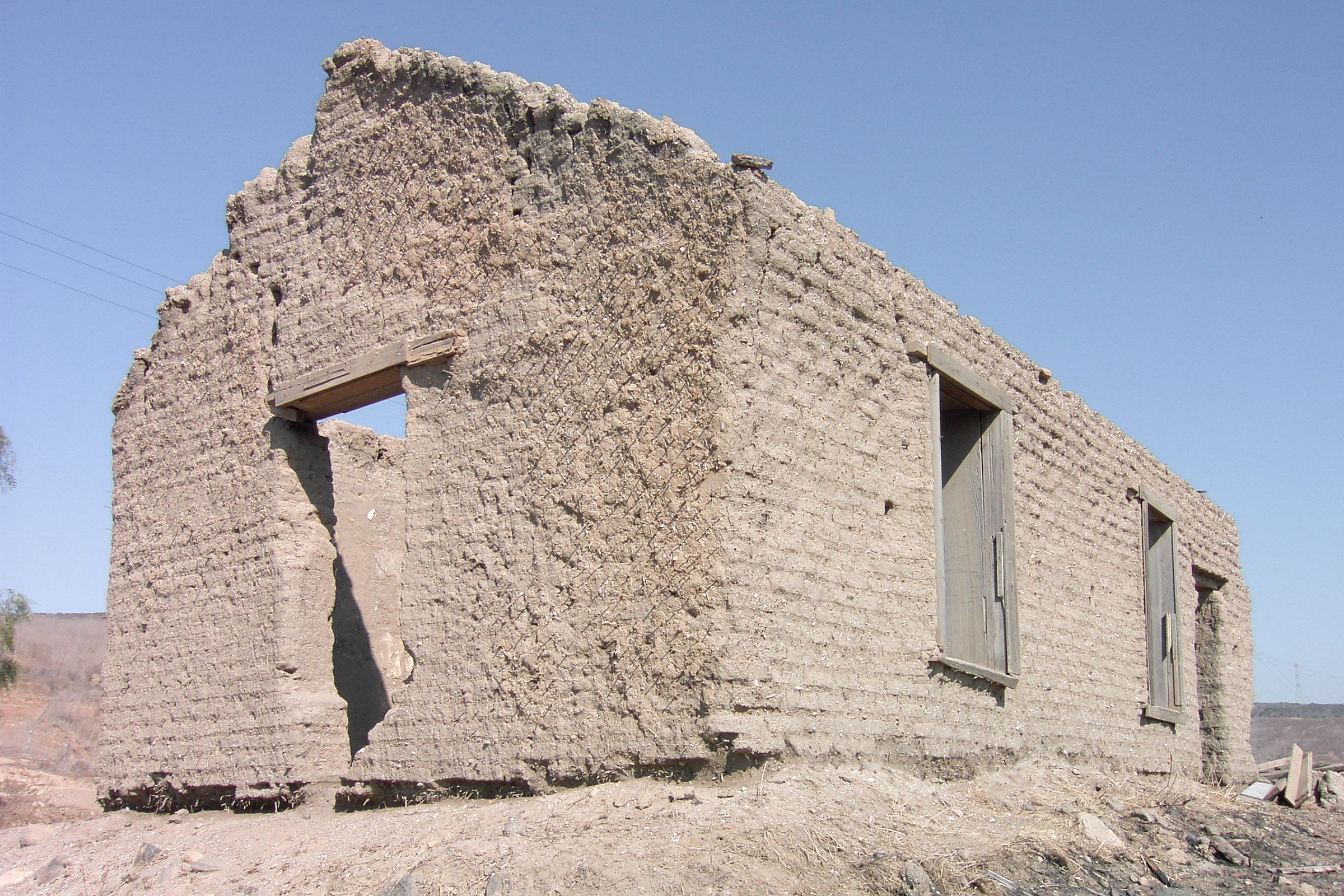
- The fort at Mission El Descanso

- Location in Baja California Location in Mexico
- Location: Playas de Rosarito Municipality, Baja California, Mexico
- Coordinates: 32°12′19″N 116°54′19″W
- Name as founded: Misión San Miguel la Nueva
- Patron: Archangel Michael
- Founded: 1810
- Founded by: Tomás de Ahumada
- Built: 1810 (original); 1830 (second site)
- Founding Order: Dominican
- Native tribe(s) Spanish name(s): Kumeyaay

Mission El Descanso (Spanish: Misión El Descanso), originally Misión San Miguel la Nueva, was a Spanish mission located in what is now Playas de Rosarito Municipality, Baja California. It was the founded by the Dominican missionary Tomás de Ahumada in 1810 in an area long inhabited by the Kumeyaay people.

The mission was the penultimate Dominican mission to be founded and the only mission to be founded in what was then the short-lived Spanish province of Baja California. It is also the northernmost mission in what is now Mexico. Today, only stone foundations and ruined adobe walls survive.

== History ==
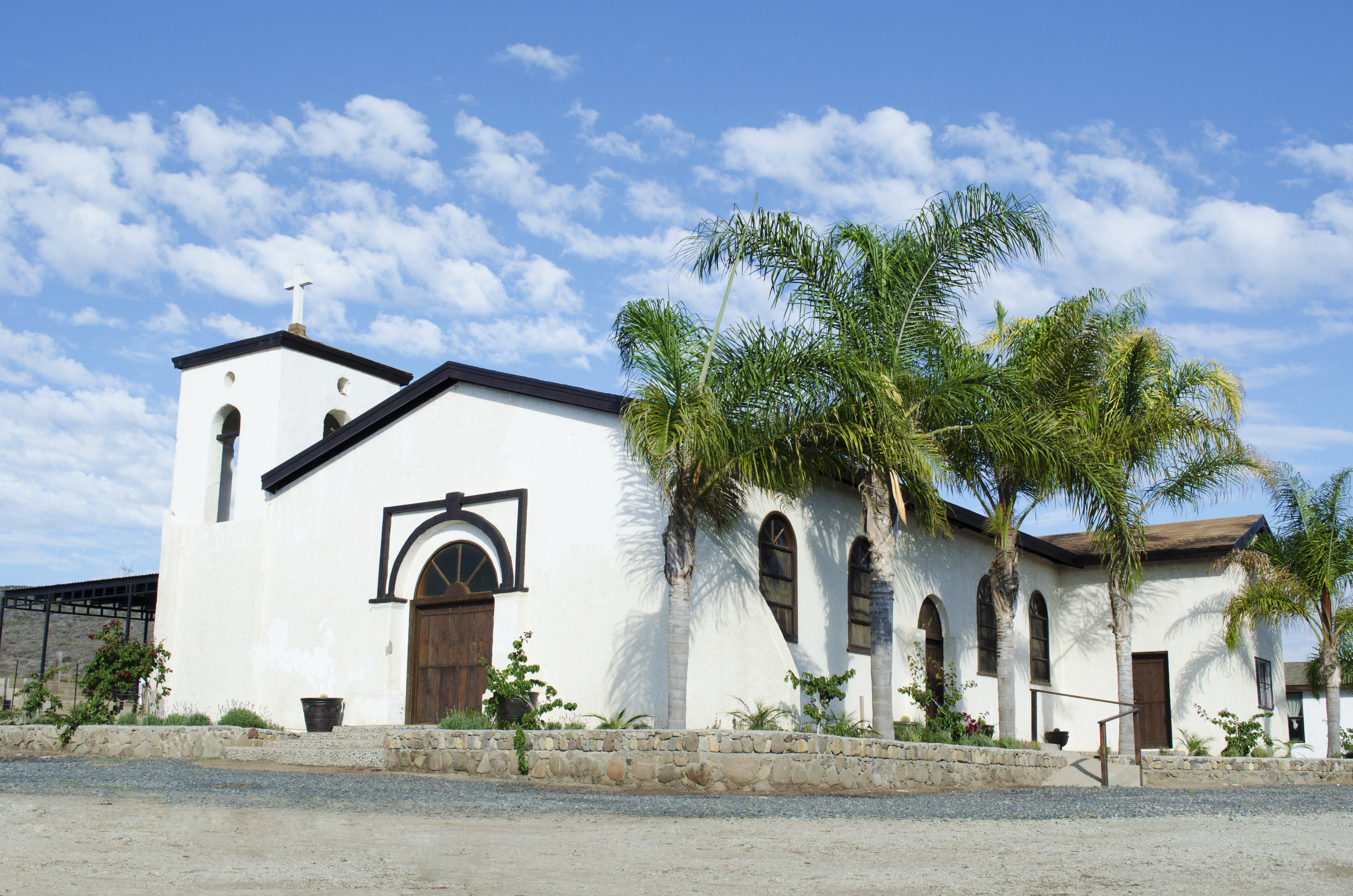
The new mission church.

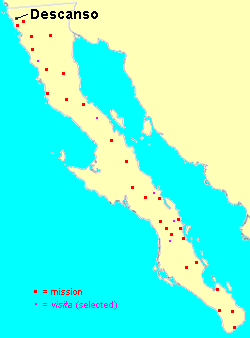
Location of Mission El Descanso among the Spanish missions in Baja California

Due to the frequent flooding of Mission San Miguel by the Río Guadalupe, missionary Tomás de Ahumada sought another site located on higher ground. The preferred site was located 13 km (8.1 mi) to the north at the head of a ridge overlooking a reliable creek and the ocean. Additional advantages of the site included the northerly location closer to the Presidio of San Diego, as well as the farming and grazing potential of the river valley below.

In 1810, Misión San Miguel la Nueva was established.

In 1830, Father Félix Caballero oversaw the construction of an adobe church and fortification about 600 m (2,000 ft) to the north of the original site. From here, both mission sites were managed in a cooperatively and collectively referred to as Mission El Descanso.

In 1834, following the Decree for the Secularization of the Missions of California, Mission El Descanso ceased to function. At the time it had a population of just 254, including those from Mission San Miguel. By 1853, the mission was deserted and fell into ruin.

== Mission complex ==
The church, the sacristy, and the missionary rooms were the main structures and formed a square. Several kilometers upstream there was a garden, a winery, and orchards. The irrigation system, which used a reservoir and gravity to take the water in acequias into the fields, was typical for missions of this sort. Protection may have been provided by a small fort, located on a hill to the south where the old cemetery is located.

Due to its proximity to the Pacific Ocean, El Descanso had been involved in a maritime commerce with ships that traveled along its shores in search of merchandise such as otter fur, salt, tallow, vegetables, and grain.

=== Construction ===
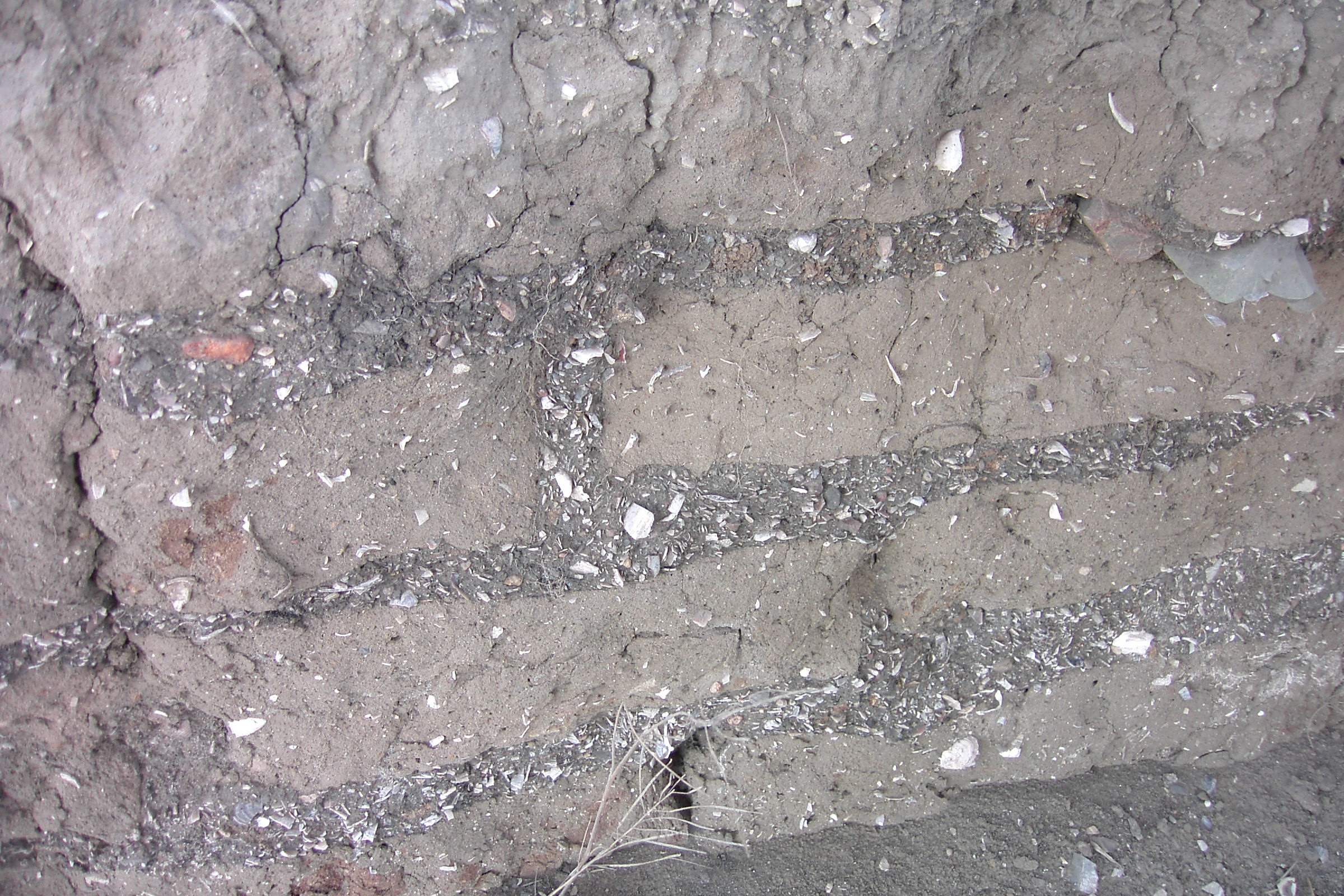
Detail of the adobe walls of the mission: crushed shells are clearly visible

The buildings were made of adobe, with round foundations set at a depth of 80 centimeters and cemented with a mortar of clay, sand, and lime.

The adobe bricks resting on the foundation were cemented with the same mixture and placed in an alternating fashion to give the walls more strength and stability. The walls were from 0.90-1.10 meters thick. The adobe was made with local soil, water, clay, and sand; unlike the other missionary complexes of the area, these were mixed with pebbles and crushed shells instead of the usual straw, to make the material tougher.

The walls probably reached a height of 4.5 m (15 ft). The roofs were interlaced with rush branches over oak beams, and the floors were made of adobe tile.

== Location and natural habitat ==
The ruins of this mission are situated in El Descanso Valley, on the banks of an arroyo of the same name, which ends in a small estuary. In front of this are large coastal dunes formed by strong winds from the sea that have blown the sand there.

The missionaries discovered a mild, humid climate and fertile land in this region, with the characteristic vegetation of coastal shrubs such as rush, watercress, purslane, cattail, mustard, mangrove, grease wood, coastal live oaks, manzanita, yucca, honey mesquite, red willow, cholla, and goat nut.

Animals that inhabited the region included red fox, badger, skunk, coyote, deer, cougar, bobcat, hare, rabbit, squirrel, California quail, rattlesnake, several water snakes, and lizards.

Since the sea was nearby, the sea provided other sources of food, including lobster, abalone, clam, mussel, octopus, sea bass, tuna, small sharks, rays, and sardine.

The agricultural production was favored by the humid climate, allowing the cultivation of wheat, barley, and corn, as well as a diversity of fruits and vegetables.

The orchard and vineyard were located in the eastern portion of the valley. Animals kept included cattle, sheep, goats, horses, and mules.

== Conservation ==
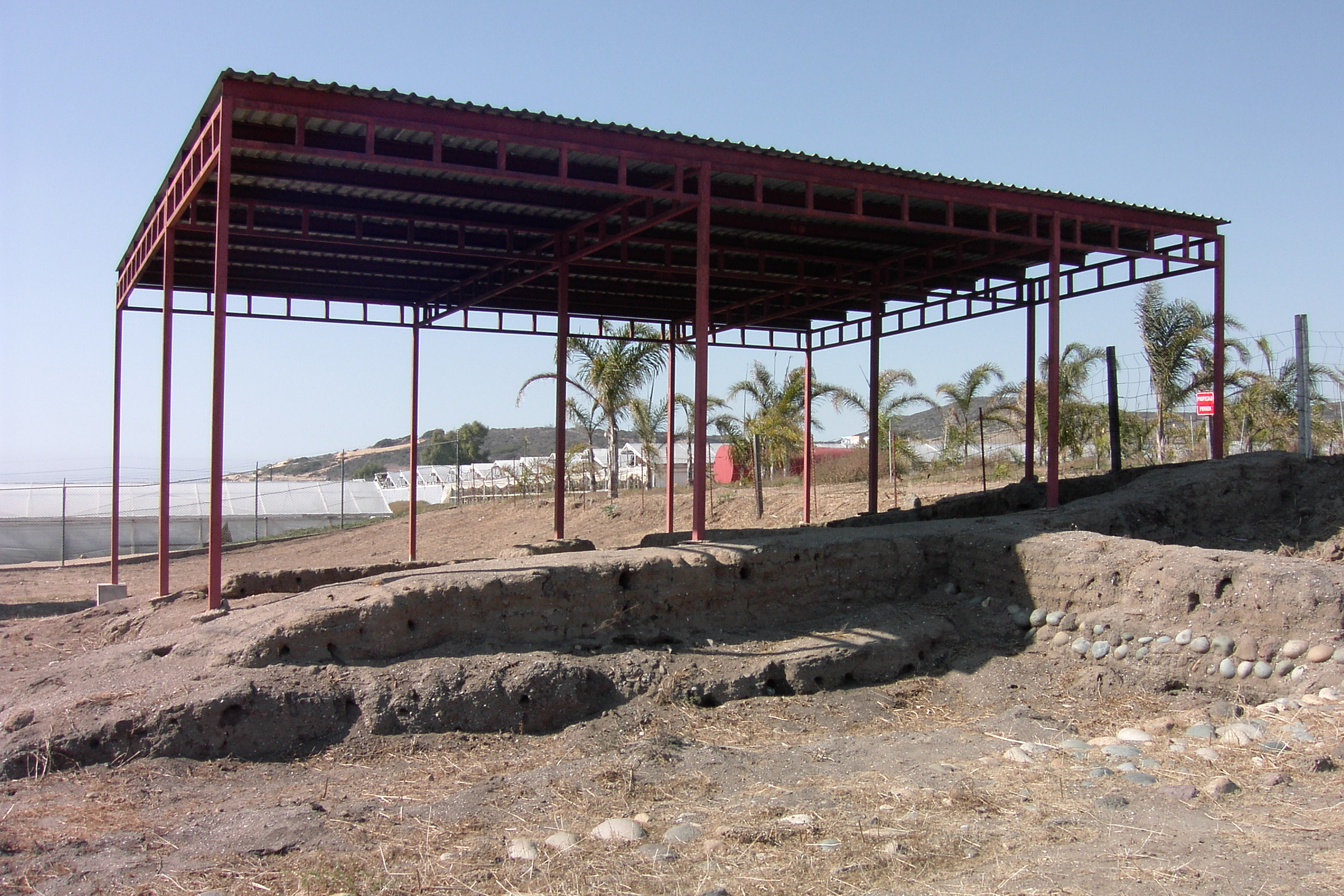
Metal covering over the remains of the mission

Of the original mission complex, only the foundations, small portions of the mission walls, and an outbuilding remain. Efforts to preserve and study the remaining traces of Mission El Descanso have been implemented under the auspices of Mexico's National Institute of Anthropology and History (INAH). A provisional metal covering was installed to protect the remaining adobe tile floors, adobe walls, and foundations from the elements. Exploratory archaeological excavations were also made at the site in 1997.

== El Descanso Church ==
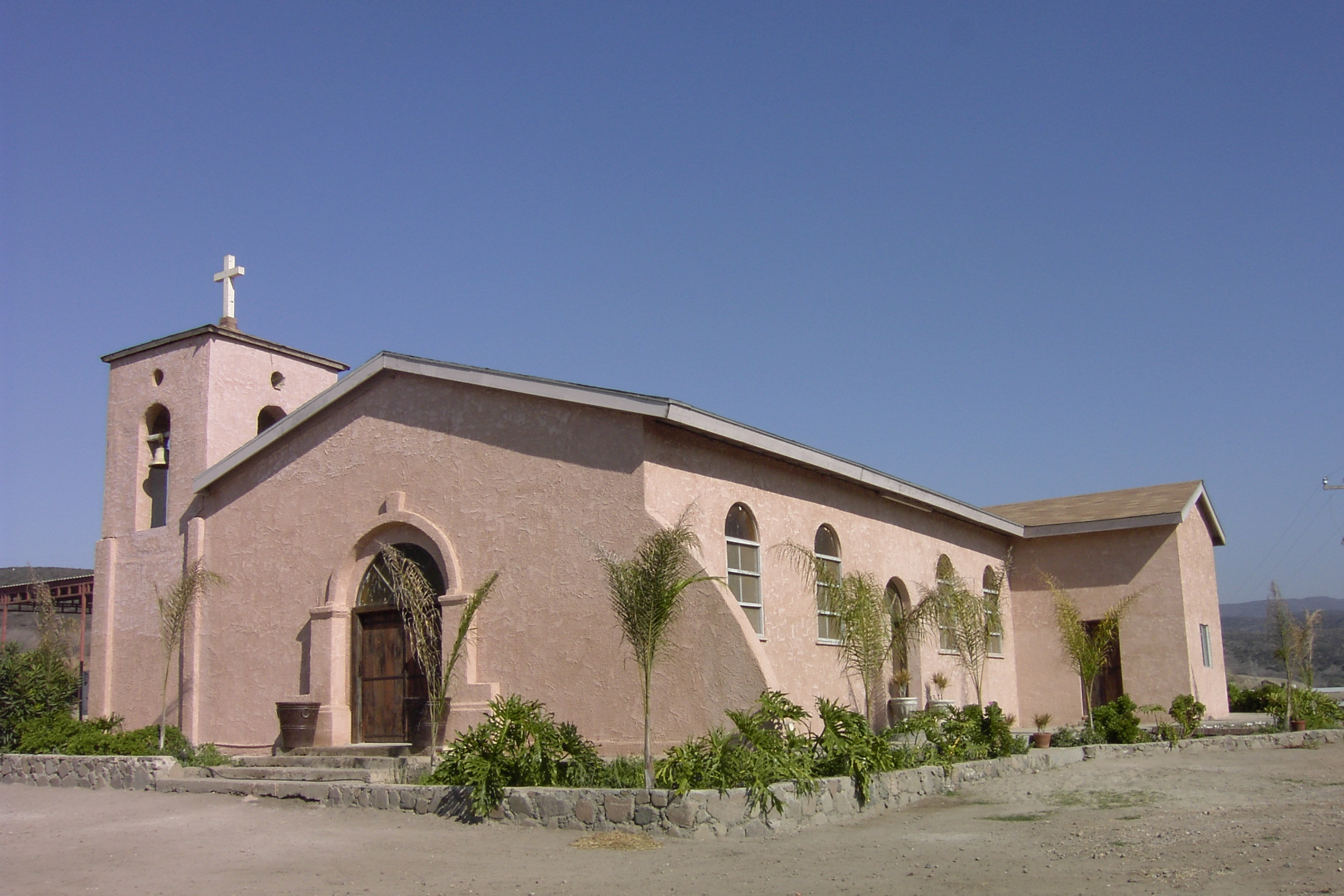
El Descanso Church, built on the site of the 1830 Dominican Misión El Descanso

El Descanso Church, officially the Iglesia de San Miguel Arcángel, a new Mission Revival Style Church, was built on the site of the 1830 Dominican Misión El Descanso, south of the present-day city of Rosarito, Baja California.

== See also ==
- Spanish missions in Baja California
- Spanish missions in California
- Mission San Diego de Alcalá
- Misión Guadalupe del Norte - the final Dominican mission to be founded, 1834
- Mission San Francisco Solano - the final Franciscan mission to be founded, 1824
