= Puerto Rico Highway 16 =

Highway in Puerto Rico

Highway 16
- Ruta 16
- Bulevar Román Baldorioty de Castro

Route information
- Maintained by Puerto Rico DTPW
- Length: 0.85 km (0.53 mi; 2,800 ft)

Major junctions
- South end: Calle Miraflores in Santurce
- PR-35 in Santurce
- North end: PR-1 / PR-26 in Santurce

Location
- Country: United States
- Territory: Puerto Rico
- Municipalities: San Juan

Highway system
- Roads in Puerto Rico; List
← PR-15	→ PR-17

Puerto Rico Highway 16 (PR-16) is an urban road in Santurce, Puerto Rico. With a length of about 0.85 kilometers (0.53 mi), this highway extends from an interchange with PR-1, PR-26 and Avenida Juan Ponce de León (PR-25) to PR-1 south.

== Route description ==
This is a short road with two lanes per direction on most of its length and is parallel to PR-1 (Expreso Luis Muñoz Rivera), near to the western terminus of PR-26 (Expreso Román Baldorioty de Castro). This road intersects with PR-35 (Avenida Manuel Fernández Juncos) and provides access to Puerto Rico Convention Center and Fernando Luis Ribas Dominicci Airport. This road is called Boulevard Román Baldorioty de Castro.

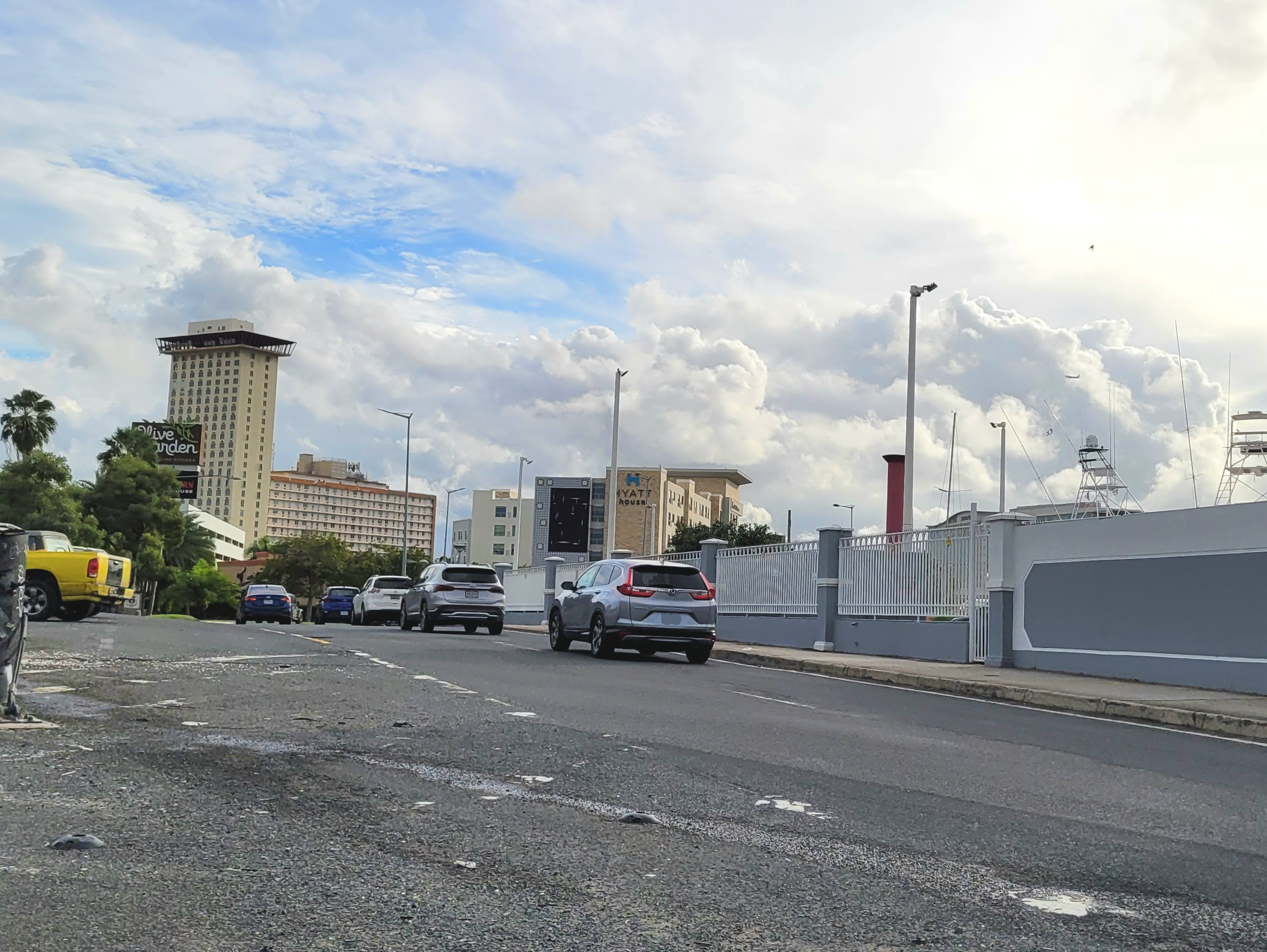
Southbound beginning of PR-16, leaving PR-1 interchange

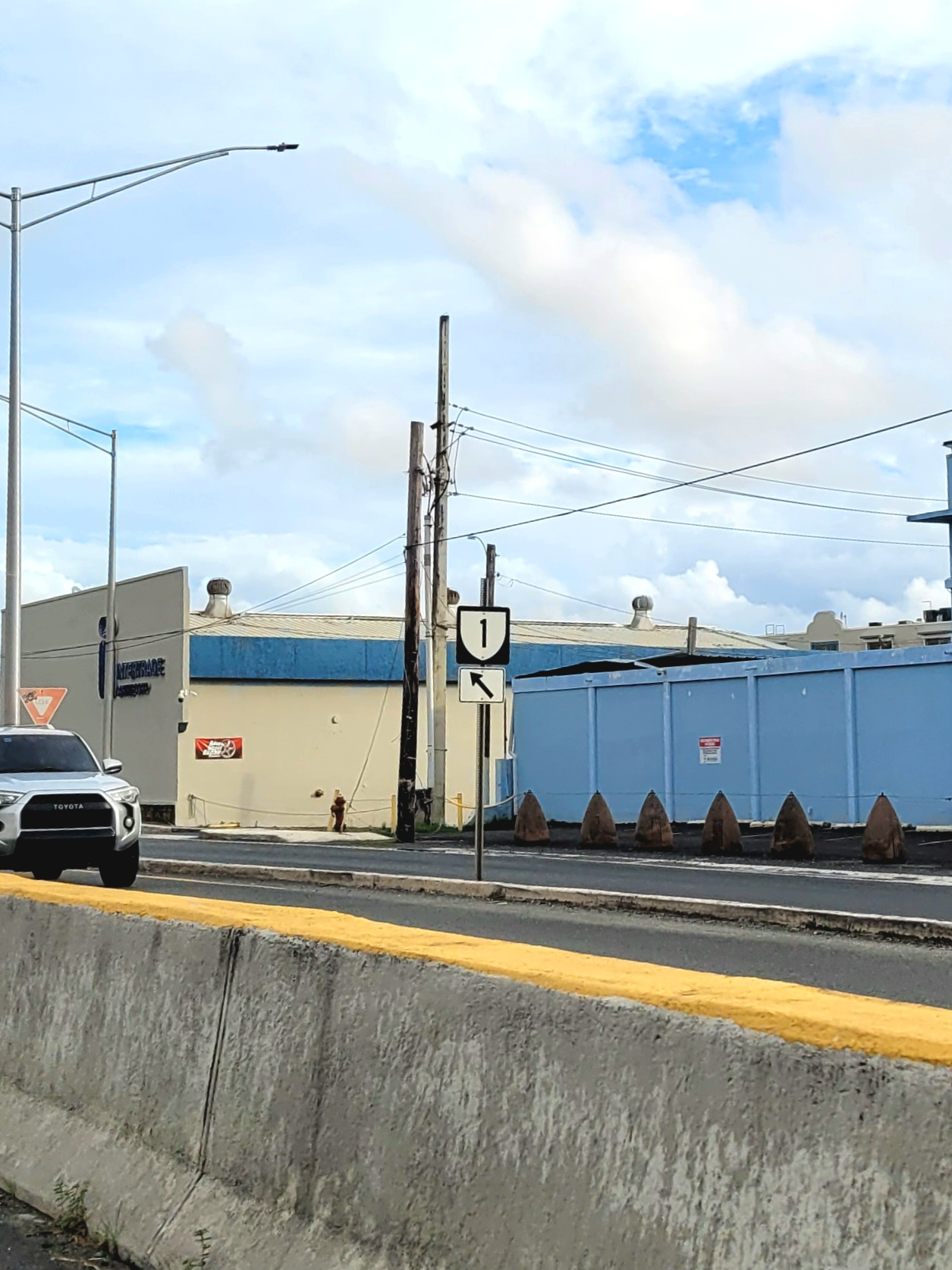
PR-16 at its southern terminus

== Major intersections ==
The entire route is located in Santurce, San Juan.

km	mi	Destinations	Notes
0.85	0.53	To PR-1 south (Expreso Luis Muñoz Rivera) / PR-Calle Miraflores – Hato Rey, Zona Portuaria	Southern terminus of PR-16; no left turn from Calle Miraflores
0.7	0.43	PR-Calle Refugio – Santurce	No access across PR-16; no left turn from PR-16 northbound
0.6	0.37	PR-Bulevar del Centro de Convenciones – Santurce	Access to Puerto Rico Convention Center
0.4	0.25	PR-Paseo Isla Grande – Santurce	No left turn from PR-16 southbound
0.3– 0.2	0.19– 0.12	PR-35 south (Avenida Manuel Fernández Juncos) / PR-Calle Lindbergh – Santurce	Access to Fernando Luis Ribas Dominicci Airport
0.0	0.0	PR-1 north (Expreso Luis Muñoz Rivera) / PR-26 east (Expreso Román Baldorioty de Castro) – San Juan, Carolina	Northern terminus of PR-16; no access to PR-1 southbound; no exit ramp from PR-26
1.000 mi = 1.609 km; 1.000 km = 0.621 mi: Incomplete access

== See also ==
- Román Baldorioty de Castro
