= Figueroa (Santurce) =

Subbarrio of Santurce in San Juan, Puerto Rico

Coordinates: 18°26′54″N 66°04′30″W

- Subbarrio
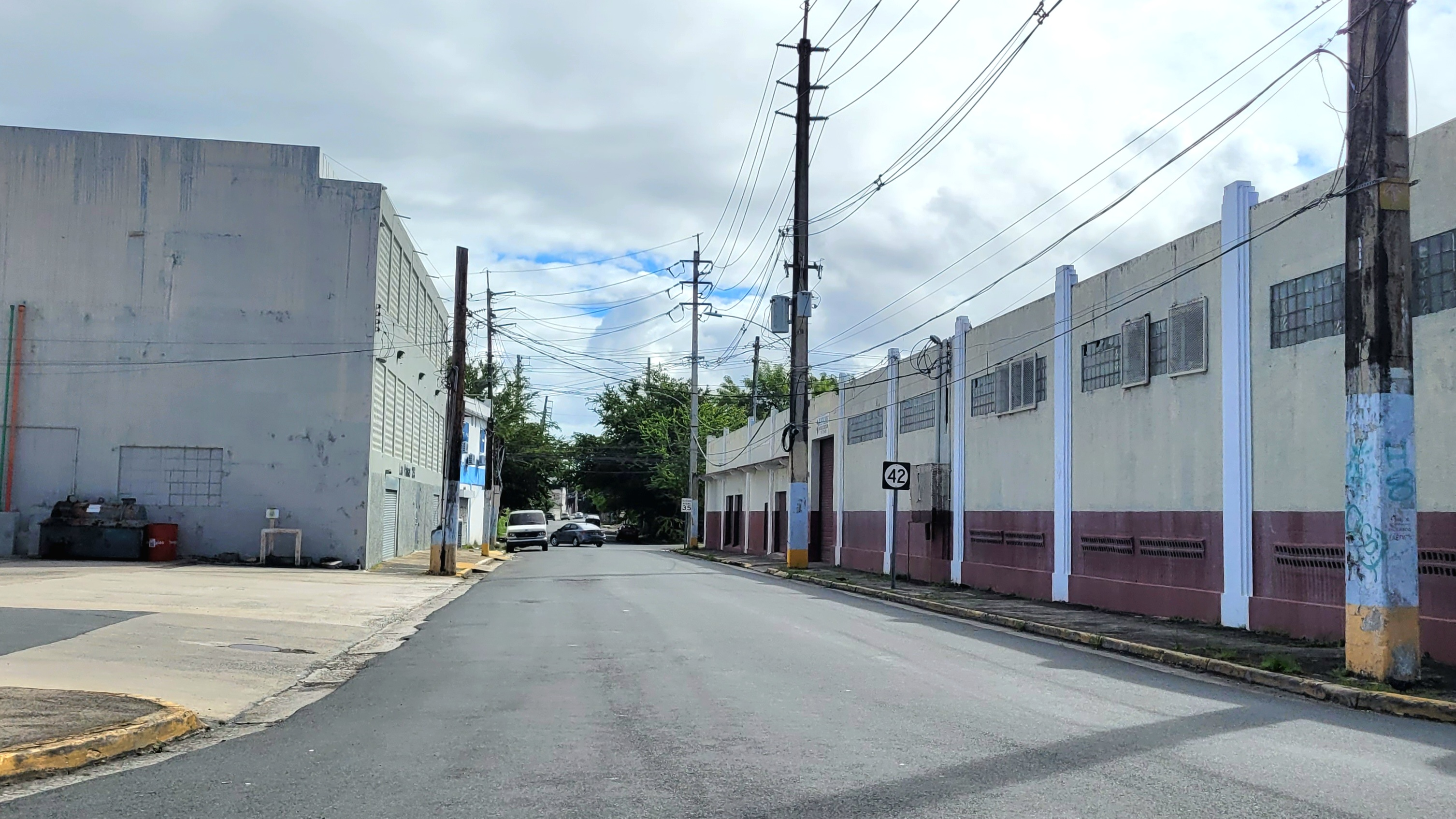
- Puerto Rico Highway 42 in Figueroa

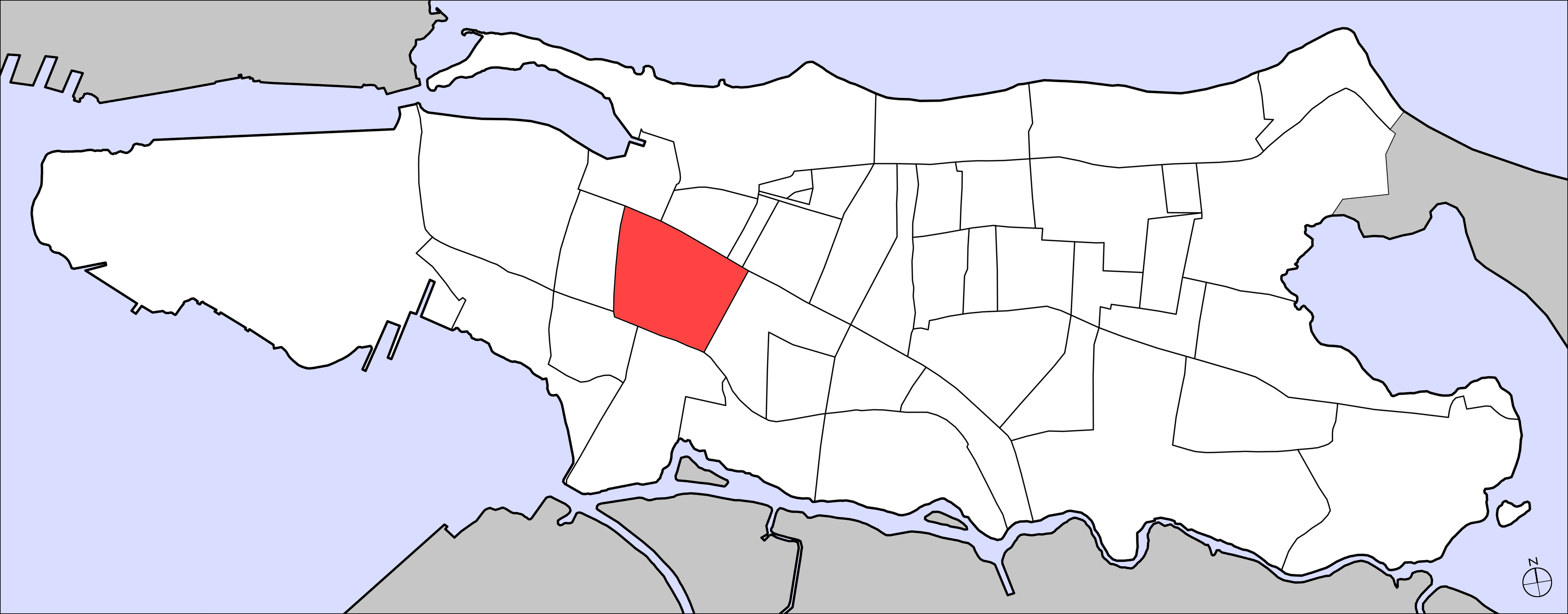
- Commonwealth: Puerto Rico
- Municipality: San Juan
- Barrio: Santurce

Area
  - Total: .14 sq mi (0.36 km^{2})
  - Land: .14 sq mi (0.36 km^{2})
- Elevation: 0 ft (0 m)

Population (2010)
  - Total: 698
  - Density: 4,985.7/sq mi (1,925.0/km^{2})
- Source: 2010 Census
- Time zone: UTC−4 (AST)

Figueroa is one of the forty subbarrios of Santurce, San Juan, Puerto Rico.

== Demographics ==
In 1940, Figueroa had a population of 3,209.

In 2000, Figueroa had a population of 1,016.

In 2010, Figueroa had a population of 698 and a population density of 4,985.7 persons per square mile.

== See also ==
- List of communities in Puerto Rico
