= Baja Beach Fest =

Yearly music festival held in Mexico

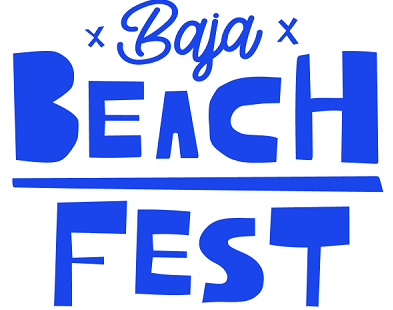
- Genre: Reggaeton, Latin
- Dates: August every year
- Locations: Rosarito, Baja California, Mexico
- Years active: 2018–present
- Website: https://bajabeachfest.com/

The Baja Beach Fest is a reggaeton & Latin music festival. The festival was inaugurated in 2018 and is held annually in Rosarito, Baja California, Mexico.

== History ==
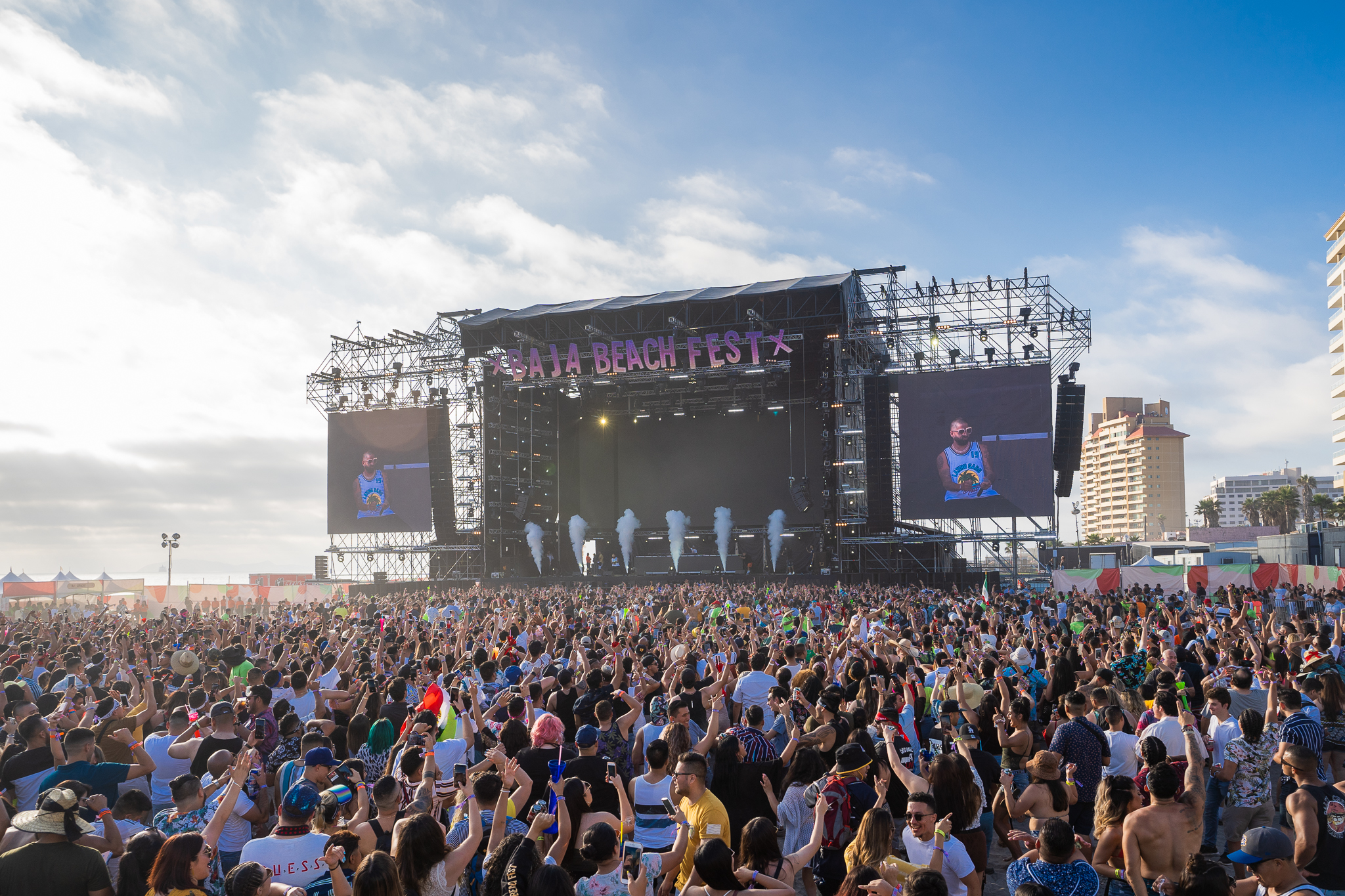
Baja Beach Fest 2019

Baja Beach Fest was founded in 2018 by Rosarito-based Aaron Ampudia and Los Angeles-based Chris Den Uijl, who met in Encinitas and are the current co-owners and promoters of the festival. It is an annual beachside festival held in the month of August every year.

The 2018 festival was one-day event which hosted 15 thousand people and featured performances by Bad Bunny, Yandel, Farruko and more artists. The 2019 festival was a two-day event which hosted 30 thousand people with performance by Ozuna, J Balvin, Becky G, Bad Bunny, and Nicky Jam along with other artists including Alex Rose, Brytiago, Cazzu, DJ Luian, Lyanno, and Amenazzy. In 2019, the festival was recognized as the #1 Emerging Festival of North America by USA Today.

The 2020 festival was to be a three-day event with headline artists including Ozuna, Anuel AA, Karol G & J Balvin, however, it got delayed for reasons related to the COVID-19 pandemic. In 2021, the festival hosted 30 thousand fans and expanded to two weekends featuring performances by artists including Ozuna, Karol G, El Alfa, Lunay, Dalex, Farruko, Becky G, Sech and DJ Luian. The organizers followed COVID19 regulations for safety.

The 2021 festival began from August 13 to August 22 with hosting artists including Karol G, Rauw Alejandro, Lunay, Guaynaa, Jhay Cortez, J Balvin, Kali Uchis, Justin Quiles and more.

The 2022 festival began from August 12-14th to August 19-21st with hosting artists including Daddy Yankee, Anuel AA, Maluma, Arcángel, Wisin & Yandel, Sech, Nicki Nicole, Natti Natasha, Myke Towers, Farruko, Emilia Mernes and more.

The 2024 festival began from August 9th to August 11th with hosting artists including Peso Pluma, Rauw Alejandro, Fuerza Regida, Becky G, Yandel, Jhayco, Kali Uchis and many more.

== See also ==
- Midi Music Festival
- Festival of the Sound
- Laurel Pop Festival
