= Puerto Rico Highway 42 =

Highway in Puerto Rico

Highway 42
- Ruta 42
- Calle Las Palmas

Route information
- Maintained by Puerto Rico DTPW
- Length: 1.0 km (0.62 mi)

Major junctions
- West end: PR-39 in Santurce
- PR-2 in Santurce
- East end: Calle Lafayette in Santurce

Location
- Country: United States
- Territory: Puerto Rico
- Municipalities: San Juan

Highway system
- Roads in Puerto Rico; List
| ← PR-41 | → PR-47 |

Puerto Rico Highway 42 (PR-42) is an urban road in Santurce. This is a short road that connects from the PR-39 (Calle Cerra) to Calle Lafayette and intersects with PR-2. It is parallel to the PR-35 (Avenida Manuel Fernández Juncos) and PR-25 (Avenida Juan Ponce de León). This road is called Calle Las Palmas.

== Major intersections ==
The entire route is located in Santurce, San Juan.

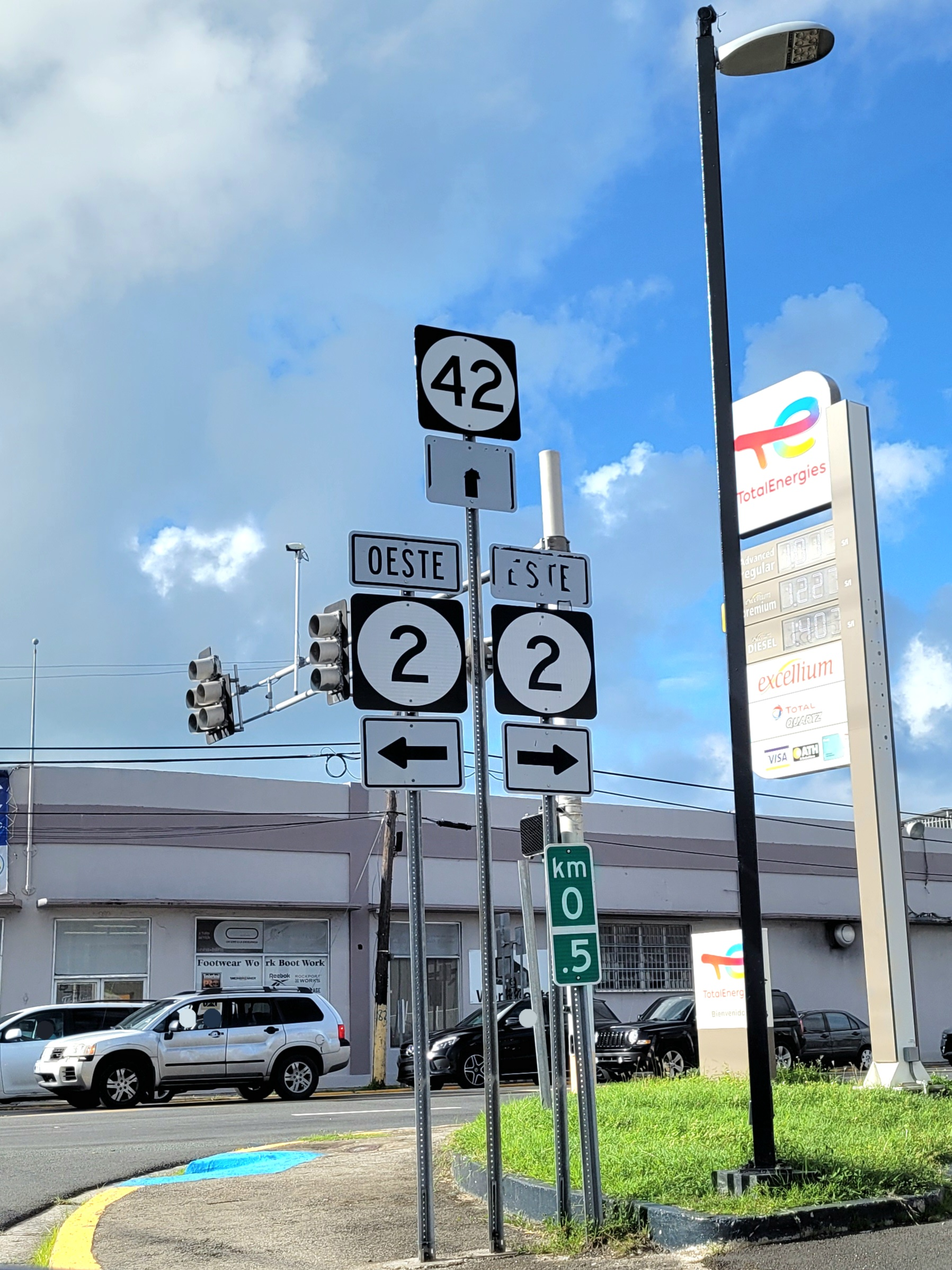
PR-42 west at PR-2 junction in Santurce

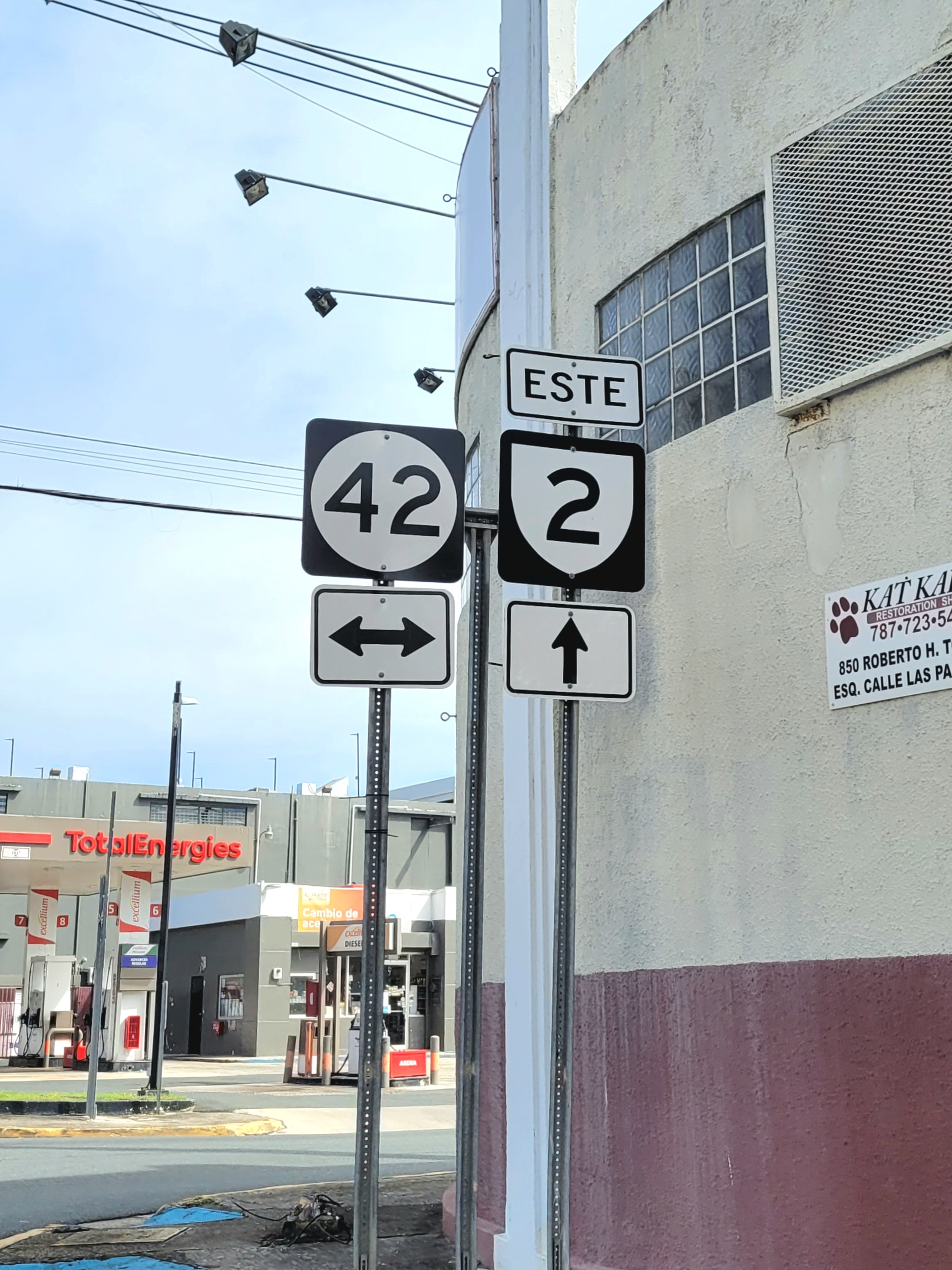
PR-2 east at PR-42 junction in Santurce

| km | mi | Destinations | Notes |
|---|---|---|---|
| 0.0 | 0.0 | PR-39 (Calle Cerra) to PR-1 | Western terminus of PR-42; no right turn |
| 0.5 | 0.31 | PR-2 (Calle Labra) | Calle Labra is also known as Avenida Roberto H. Todd |
| 1.0 | 0.62 | Calle Lafayette | Eastern terminus of PR-42 |
1.000 mi = 1.609 km; 1.000 km = 0.621 mi: Incomplete access

== See also ==
- List of streets in San Juan, Puerto Rico
