= Puerto Rico Highway 35 =

Highway in Puerto Rico

Highway 35
- Ruta 35
- Avenida Manuel Fernández Juncos

Route information
- Maintained by Puerto Rico DTPW
- Length: 4.1 km (2.5 mi)

Major junctions
- South end: PR-1 in Santurce
- PR-37 in Santurce; PR-22 in Santurce; PR-2 in Santurce; PR-39 in Santurce
- North end: PR-16 in Santurce

Location
- Country: United States
- Territory: Puerto Rico
- Municipalities: San Juan

Highway system
- Roads in Puerto Rico; List
| ← PR-34 | → PR-36 |

Puerto Rico Highway 35 (PR-35), also known as Avenida Manuel Fernández Juncos, is an urban road in San Juan, Puerto Rico. This highway extends from PR-16 to PR-1.

== Route description ==
It begins at Miramar, near the intersection of PR-1 (Expreso Luis Muñoz Rivera) and PR-26 (Expreso Román Baldorioty de Castro) to the PR-1 (Avenida Luis Muñoz Rivera), near Hato Rey. It is a road that runs parallel to PR-25 (Avenida Juan Ponce de León). Among its intersections are PR-39 (Calle Cerra), PR-2 and PR-37.

Puerto Rico Highway 35

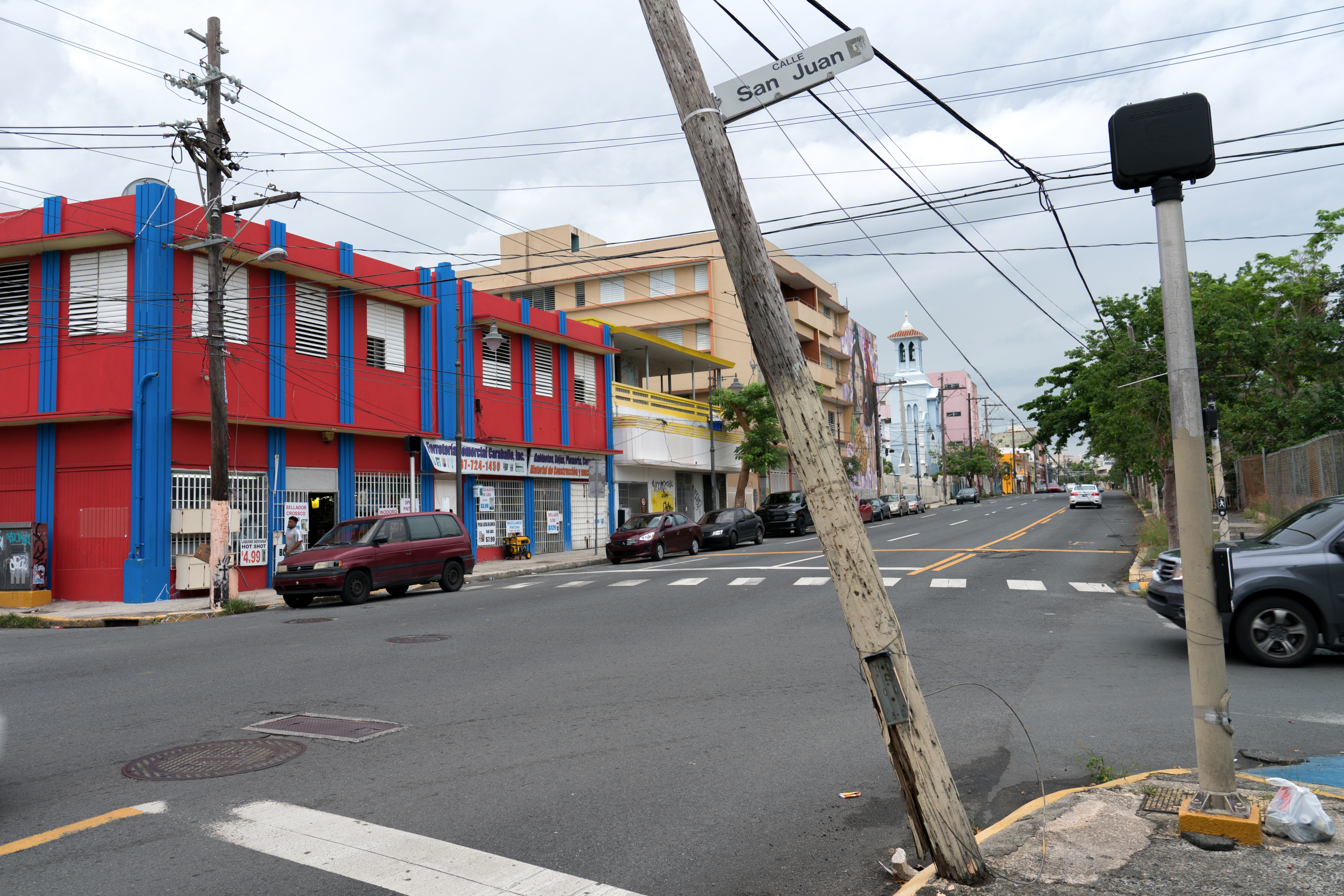
Looking north in Santurce

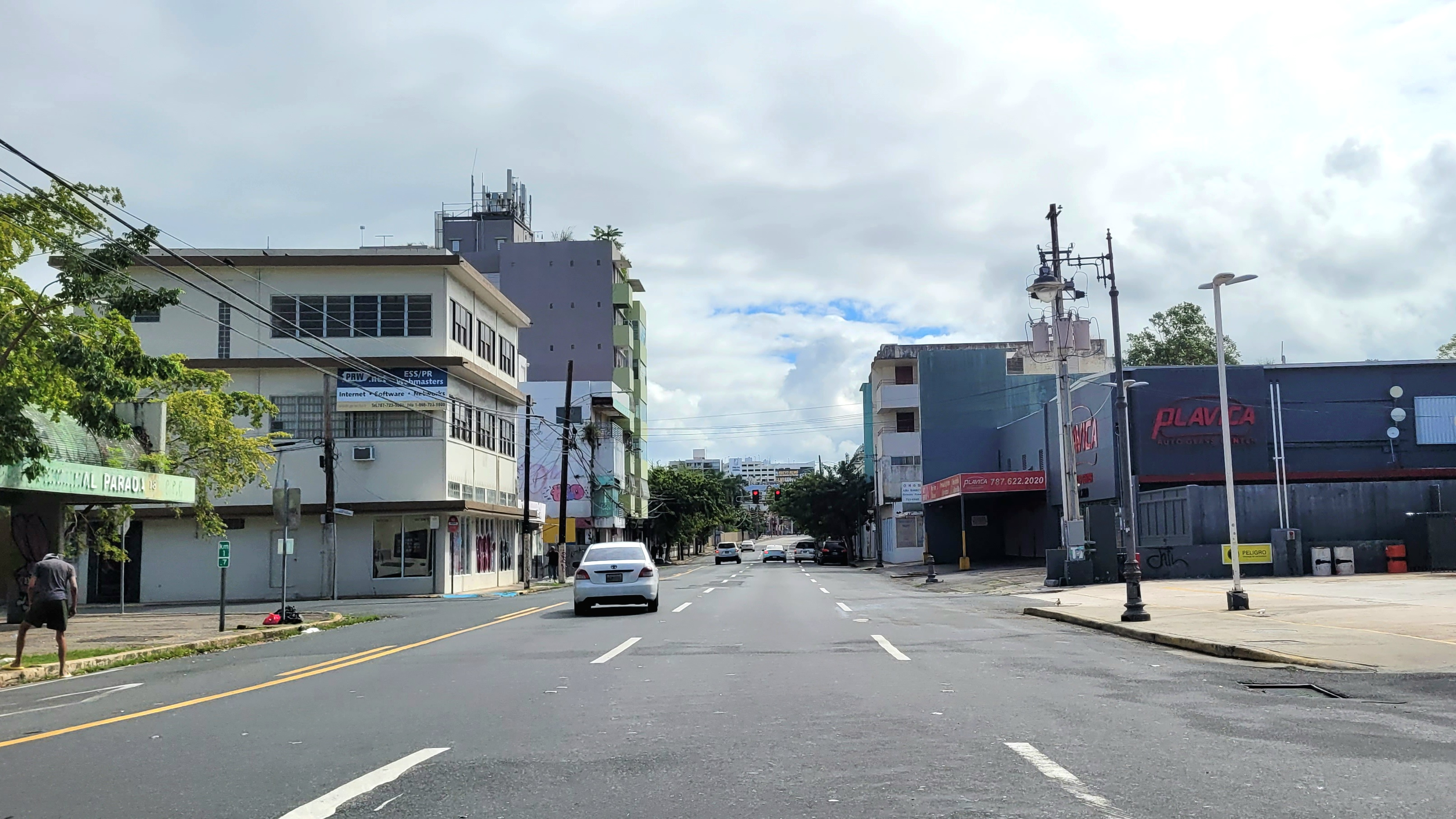
Looking south in Santurce

== Major intersections ==
The entire route is located in Santurce, San Juan.

| km | mi | Destinations | Notes |
|---|---|---|---|
| 4.1 | 2.5 | PR-1 south (Avenida Luis Muñoz Rivera) – Hato Rey | Southern terminus of PR-35 |
| 3.8– 3.7 | 2.4– 2.3 | To PR-1 north (Expreso Luis Muñoz Rivera) / PR-36 (Avenida Borinquen) – Santurce, Bayamón, Caguas | |
| 3.0 | 1.9 | PR-Avenida José Fidalgo Díaz / PR-Calle Los Ángeles – Santurce | |
| 2.5 | 1.6 | PR-37 (Calle Doctor Manuel Fernández Pavía) – Santurce | One-way street |
| 2.4 | 1.5 | PR-22 west (Autopista José de Diego) – Bayamón, Caguas | PR-22 exit 0B; incomplete diamond interchange; eastbound exit and westbound entrance |
| 1.7– 1.6 | 1.1– 0.99 | PR-2 (Avenida Roberto H. Todd) – San Juan, Bayamón | |
| 1.2– 1.1 | 0.75– 0.68 | PR-39 (Calle Cerra) – Santurce | One-way street; northbound access via Calle Monserrate |
| 0.0 | 0.0 | PR-16 (Bulevar Román Baldorioty de Castro) – Santurce | Northern terminus of PR-35 |
1.000 mi = 1.609 km; 1.000 km = 0.621 mi: Incomplete access; Route transition

== See also ==
- Manuel Fernández Juncos
