= History of the mapping of California =

Attempts to survey and map California

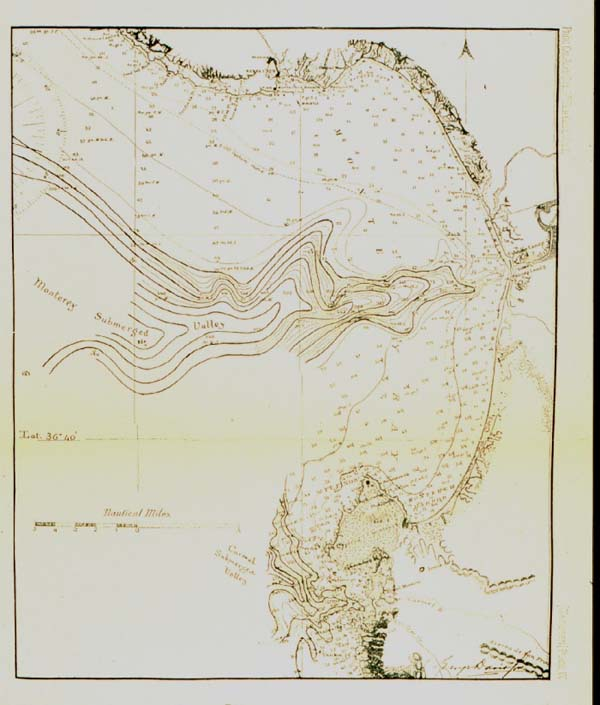
The 1897 contoured map of Monterey Bay 1897 contoured map of Monterey "Submerged Valley". From George Davidson published paper in Proc. of Calif. Acad. of Sciences. Monterey Canyon was first noted in 1857 by James Alden of C&GS Ship ACTIVE . Alden termed the canyon a "submarine gulch." Courtesy of the NOAA Image Library .

Exploration of California by Europeans began in 1542 with Juan Rodríguez Cabrillo of Spain. Although 16th-century maps correctly depicted California as a peninsula, many 17th-century maps depicted California as an island. This error was not corrected until the mid-18th century.

The first geological mapping of California began in 1826. Interest in plotting California's landscapes increased when gold was discovered in 1848.

California quickly became a well-documented piece of the United States. Modern improvements to mapping technology, particularly GIS, have enabled every aspect of California to be recorded on a map.

== History ==
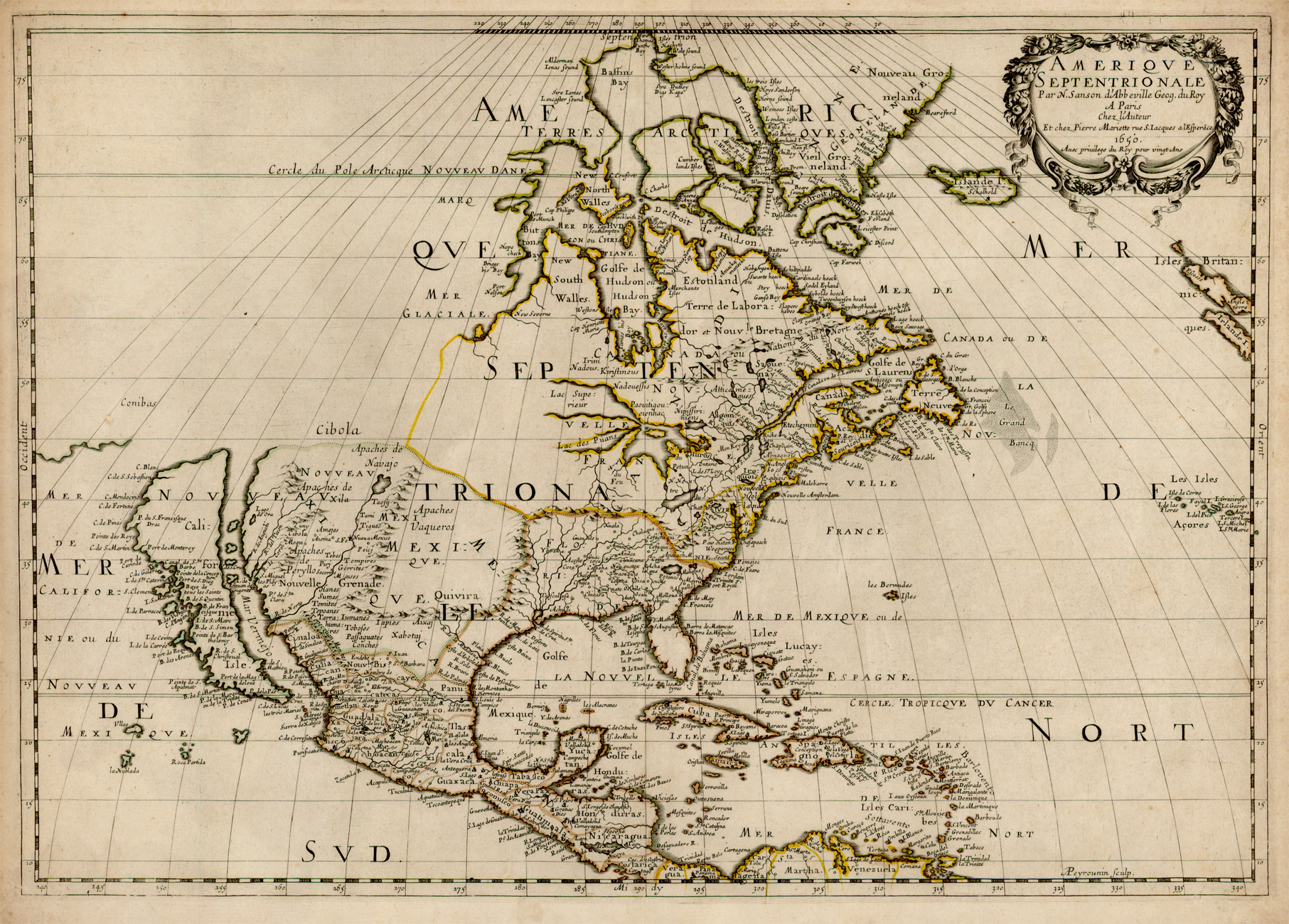
1650 Nicolas Sanson map showing California as an island.

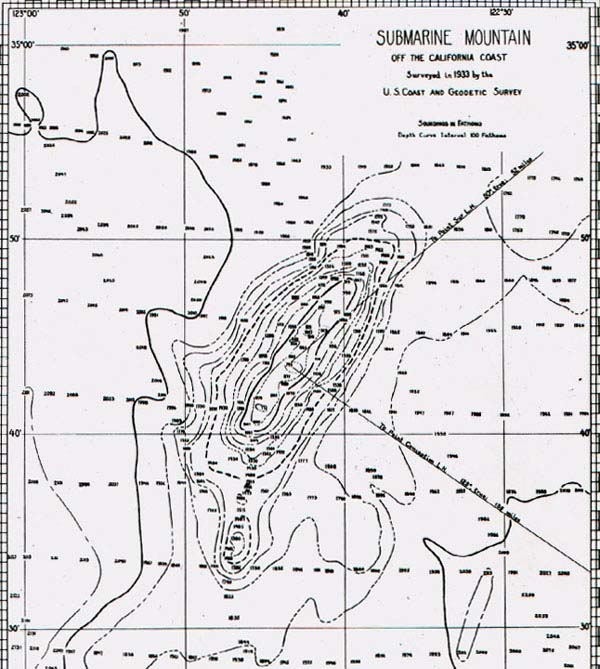
A bathymetric map of the Davidson Seamount, before it was named for George Davidson in 1936. Courtesy of the NOAA Image Library.

=== Island of California myth ===
The Island of California (Spanish: Isla de California) refers to the long-held global misconception, dating from the 16th century, that the California region was not part of mainland North America but rather a large island separated from the continent by a strait now known to be the Gulf of California.

One of the most famous cartographic errors in history, it was propagated on many maps during the 17th and 18th centuries, despite contradictory evidence from various explorers. The legend was initially infused with the idea that California was a terrestrial paradise, like the Garden of Eden or Atlantis. This mapping error was not a one-off event. From the mid-1500s to the late 1700s great controversy surrounded the geography of California. For instance, a Spanish map from 1548 depicts California as a peninsula, while a 1622 Dutch map depicts California as an island. A 1626 Portuguese map depicts the land as a peninsula, while a 1630 British map depicts it as an island. A French map from 1682 only shows the tip of the Baja Peninsula. There are slightly over 1,000 maps in Stanford's Glen McLaughlin Collection of California as an Island, the largest collection of such maps in the world.

=== Early surveying and mapping efforts by the US ===
In 1841, Cadwalader Ringgold, an officer in the United States Navy, spent twenty days surveying the San Francisco Bay watershed as a member of the United States Exploring Expedition In 1849, Cadwalader Ringgold began a more comprehensive survey the San Francisco Bay region, the Sacramento River, and parts of the American and created several maps which included depth sounding information for the Sacramento River and San Francisco Bay. Also included on the maps are the sizes and locations of settlements along the Sacramento River. A Series of Charts with Sailing Directions, by Cadwalader Ringgold was published in 1852. This book includes the maps from the 1849 expedition and color illustrations of ports and important landmarks. To further supplement the navigators, the book includes notes on observed magnetic variation and a table of 26 coordinates for landmarks, harbors, and a table of bearings for several point-to-point journeys.

In 1857, the commanding officer of the United States Coast Survey Steamer, Active, discovered a deep submarine valley, or "gulch", in the center of Monterey Bay. This was the first known sea-floor canyon and is now called Monterey Canyon.

From the 1850s through the 1860s, the United States Coast Survey, now NOAA's Office of Coast Survey, published a set of color maps with five stratigraphic units detailing the geological makeup of California as well as a comprehensive set of nautical charts for the entire coast of California.

Shortly after statehood, the California state government appointed its first State Geologist and began commissioning geologic surveys of its own. The state appointed John B. Trask to the position of State Geologist, and he served from 1850 to 1856. He compiled a report titled "On the Geology of the Sierra Nevada, or California Range." The second State Geologist, Josiah Whitney, served from 1860 to 1873. Whitney organized the first comprehensive survey of California, and the first complete topographic maps of the state were completed under him. Mount Whitney, the tallest peak in California is named after him.

The State Mining Bureau was established in 1880, and the position of State Geologist was changed to State Mineralogist. In 1891, the first state geological map showing eight color stratigraphic regions was published. The second geological map of the state was published in 1916 and shows twenty-one stratigraphic regions. The State Mining Bureau was renamed the Division of Mines and Geology in 1862. Its pseudonym, the California Geologic Survey, was established in January 2002.

In 1869, George Davidson, an assistant coast surveyor, compiled the book Pacific Coast: Coast Pilot of California, Oregon, and Washington Territory. The 262-page volume is complete with illustrations, coordinate tables, notes on magnetic variation, and some bathymetric sounding information.

The first maps of California's vegetation were produced at the end of the 19th century.

=== Modern projects ===
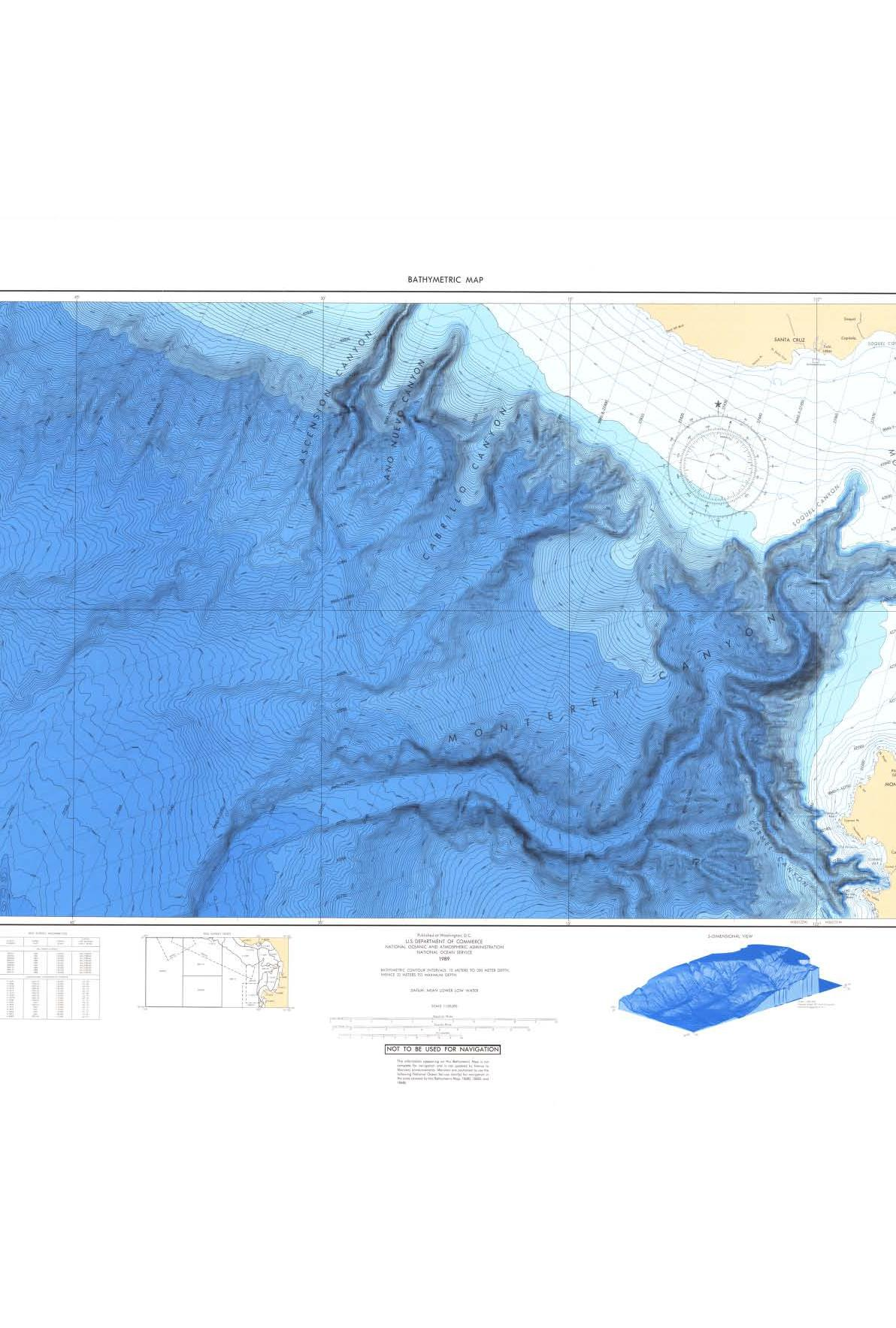
Modern Bathymetric chart of Monterey Canyon. Courtesy of NOAA.

Surveying efforts in California continue today with the assistance of modern technology. Modern mapping in California involves using modern electronics to refine information found through analog methods. Many organizations and government agencies are involved in collecting and mapping data in California today.

== See also ==
- Territorial evolution of California
- Island of California
- Bathymetry
- Depth sounding

=== Mapping legislation ===
- Alquist Priolo Special Studies Zone Act
- Surface Mining Control and Reclamation Act of 1977 (SMCRA)
- Seismic Hazards Mapping Act
