= California Geological Survey =

California state geologic agency

California Geological Survey (CGS)
Agency overview
- Formed: 1880 (as the California State Mining Bureau)
- Jurisdiction: California
- Headquarters: 715 P Street, MS 1900; Sacramento, California, U.S.
- Motto: Altiora Petimus ("We Reach Higher")
- Parent agency: Department of Conservation
- Child agencies: Burned Watershed Geohazards Program (BWGP); Forest and Watershed Geology Program (FWGP); Regional Geologic and Landslide Mapping Program (RGLMP); Mineral Resources Program (MRP); Seismic Hazards Program (SHP); California Strong Motion Instrumentation Program (CSMIP/SMIP)
- Website: www.conservation.ca.gov/cgs

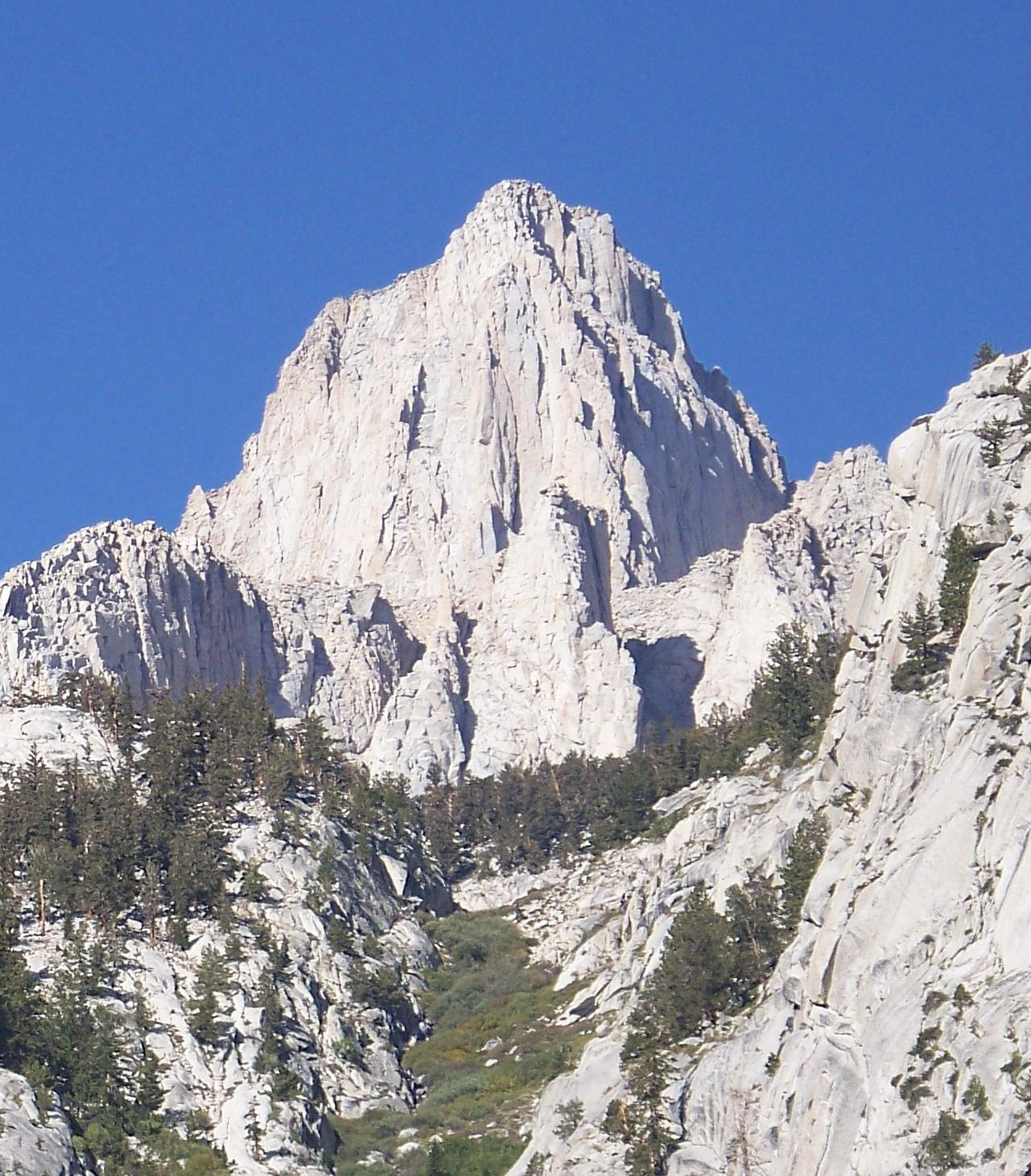
Mount Whitney, the highest peak in California, named after the second State Geologist

The California Geological Survey, previously known as the California Division of Mines and Geology, is the California state geologic agency.

== History ==
Although it was not until 1880 that the California State Mining Bureau, predecessor to the California Geological Survey, was established, the "roots" of California's state geological survey date to an earlier time. As might be expected for a state that owed its existence to the gold rush of 1849, the California state legislature recognized that geologists could provide valuable information. In 1851, one year after California was admitted to the United States, the Legislature named John B. Trask, a medical practitioner and active member of the California Academy of Sciences, as Honorary State Geologist. In 1853 the Legislature passed a joint resolution asking him for geological information about the state. He submitted a report On the Geology of the Sierra Nevada, or California Range. About two months later, the Legislature created the first California Geological Survey headed by Trask, who retained the title of State Geologist.

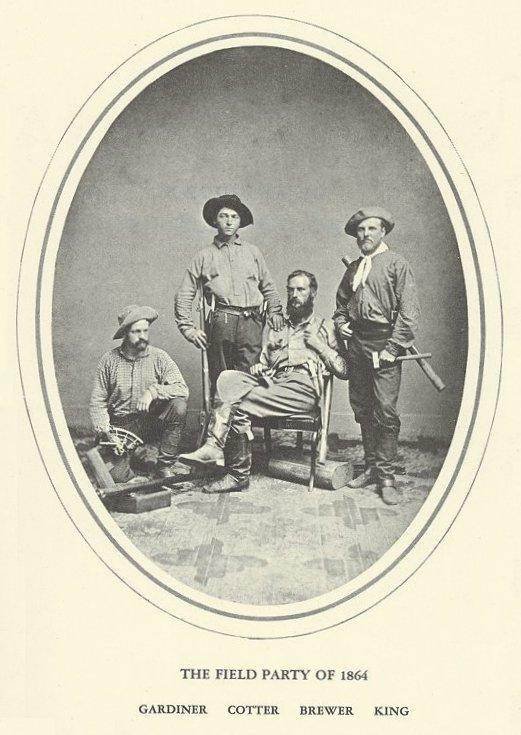
William H. Brewer's 1864 field party

Within a few years the mining of placer gold began to decline and mining of quartz lodes began. These changes, coupled with publication of reports by Trask, created a public clamor for a state geological survey. In 1860 the Legislature passed an act creating the Office of State Geologist and defining the duties thereof. The act named Josiah D. Whitney (for whom Mount Whitney is named) to fill the office. A Yale graduate, Whitney had worked on several surveys in the east. The act directed Whitney to make an accurate and complete geological survey of the state.

== The Team ==
Whitney chose William Henry Brewer as chief botanist to lead the original field party. Brewer then added Clarence King, James Gardiner, topographer Charles F. Hoffmann and packer Dick Cotter. It was one of the most ambitious geological surveys ever attempted and yielded a vast amount of information about California that was hitherto unknown and unpublished. Among the natural features of California they were the first to describe Kings Canyon, which they discovered in 1864. The original California Geological Survey influenced the future of surveying and spurred the creation of the United States Geological Survey. Funding for the field work was limited and the last field work was done in 1870 by Hoffmann and W. A. Goodyear. In 1874 the Survey was officially ended due to hostility between then Governor of California Newton Booth and Whitney.

== Later Organizations ==
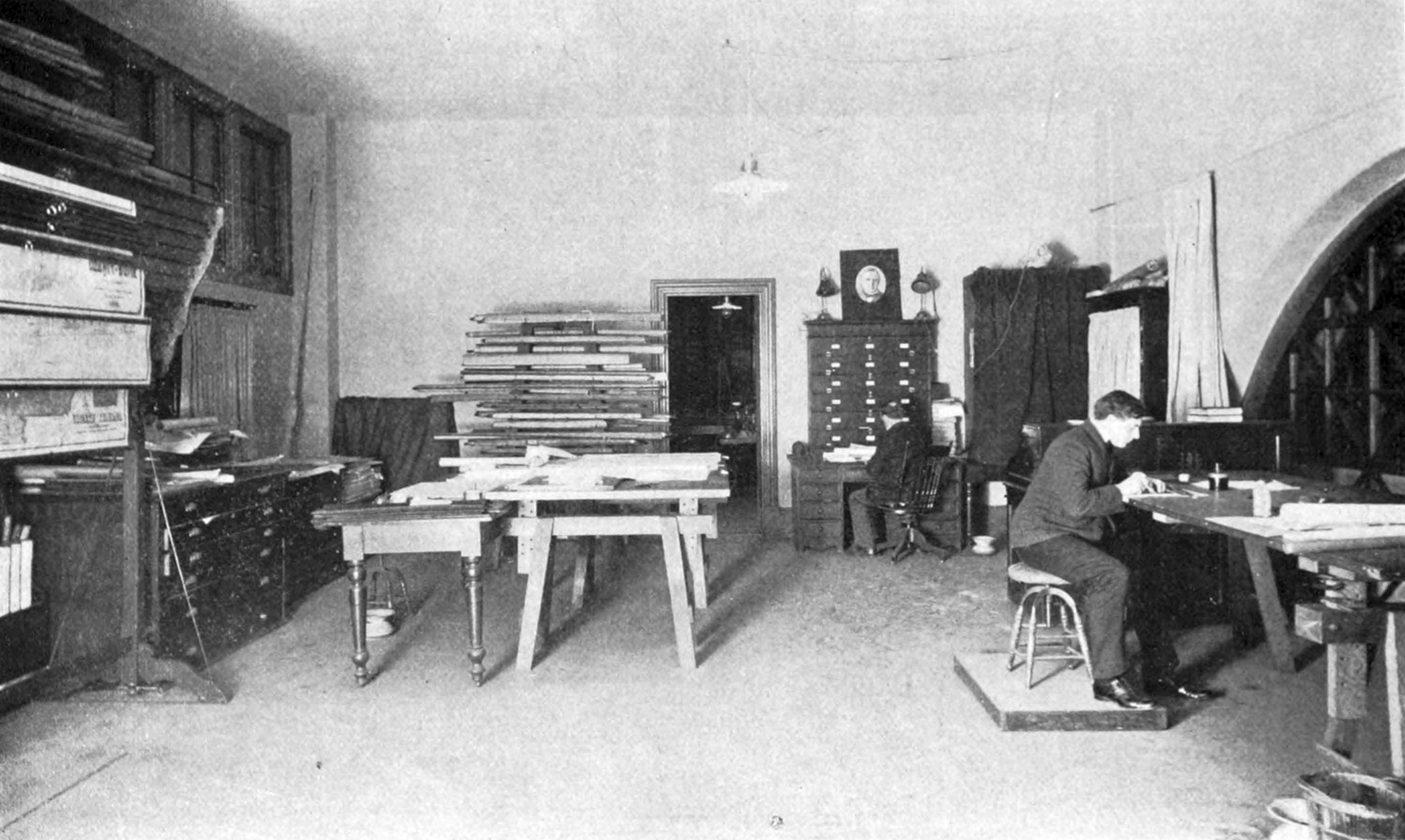
Drafting Department, 1905

In 1880 the State Mining Bureau was established by the Legislature. The establishment of the Bureau was a direct action in response to the need for information on the occurrence, mining, and processing of gold in the state. Its focus was on California's mining industry and the California governor appointed the State Mineralogist. In 1891, the Bureau published the first geologic map of the state showing eight stratigraphic units in color, along with numerous blank areas where information was lacking. The second colored geologic map of the state, published in 1916, showed 21 stratigraphic units and was accompanied by an explanatory volume (Bulletin 72, Geologic Formations of California).

In 1927 the Bureau became the Division of Mines within the Department of Natural Resources. In 1928, with the hiring of the first geologist, the focus of the Division began to shift towards the gathering of basic geologic information. In 1938 a new 1:500,000-scale geologic map was published.

During the 1940s and 1950s, the Division developed as a state geological survey and two well-defined branches were established: the Mining Engineering Branch and the Geology Branch. The Division began processing numerous geological quadrangle maps and reports for publication. In 1952 the Division conducted its first public-safety related effort by documenting the impacts of the 1952 Kern County earthquake and its aftershocks.

The 1960s were years of development of new programs and modernization of long-standing programs. In 1962, eighty-one years after its creation, the Division of Mines was renamed the Division of Mines and Geology (DMG). Its focus had shifted from an organization that was primarily mine-oriented to one responsible for a broader range of practical applications of geology, especially geologic hazards and seismic hazards. A highlight of the decade was the completion in 1966 of the geologic mapping program.

From the early 1970s to the present, Division programs have expanded often due to the passage of legislation. Following earthquakes and landslide damage during the 1970s and 1980s, legislation passed which clearly focused DMG's authority on several fronts, including:

- Establishing the Strong-Motion Instrumentation Program to obtain statewide records of the response of rock, soil, and structures to ground motion caused by earthquakes.
- Enacting the Alquist Priolo Special Studies Zone Act, mandating the delineation of zones along traces of hazardous faults.
- Enacting the Surface Mining and Reclamation Act to ensure that significant mineral deposits are identified and protected and the reclamation of mined lands.
- Declaring that the California Department of Conservation is the primary state agency responsible for geologic hazard review and investigation.
- Enacting the Seismic Hazards Mapping Act, establishing a program to identify and map seismic hazard zones.

Language was also added which outlined DMG's responsibilities as encompassing:

- Hazard assessment – identification and mapping of geologic hazards and estimates of potential consequences and likelihood of occurrence.
- Information and advisory services including maintenance of a geologic library, public education program, maintenance of a geologic data base, review functions, and expert consulting to federal, state and local government agencies.
- Emergency response including monitoring and assessment of anomalous geologic activity, and operation of a clearinghouse for post-event earth science investigations.
- Development and application of mitigation methods, including identifying state research needs, facilitating needed research, and expediting the application of new research results to public policy.

== Naming history ==
The California Geological Survey has had many names over its history. The original Geological Survey of California was replaced in April 1880 by the new California State Mining Bureau. This was renamed the Division of Mines in 1927. In 1962 the division's name was expanded to be California Division of Mines and Geology, a name that lasted until August 2006, when the state legislature renamed the division the California Geological Survey.

== See also ==
- James M. Hyde, metallurgist and curator of the Mining Museum, 1900
- Mapping California

== Resources ==
- California Geological Survey
- History of the Sierra Nevada by Francis P. Farquhar, University of California Press, 1965
