= Priolo =

Priolo may refer to:

- Alquist Priolo Special Studies Zone Act, earthquake safety legislation, California, USA
- Borgo Priolo, municipality in Lombardy, Italy
- Rosario Priolo, Chicago mobster
- Priolo, local name for the Azores bullfinch
- Priolo (horse), French racehorse
- Priolo Gargallo, municipality in Sicily, Italy
