= James Lyman Whitney =

American librarian

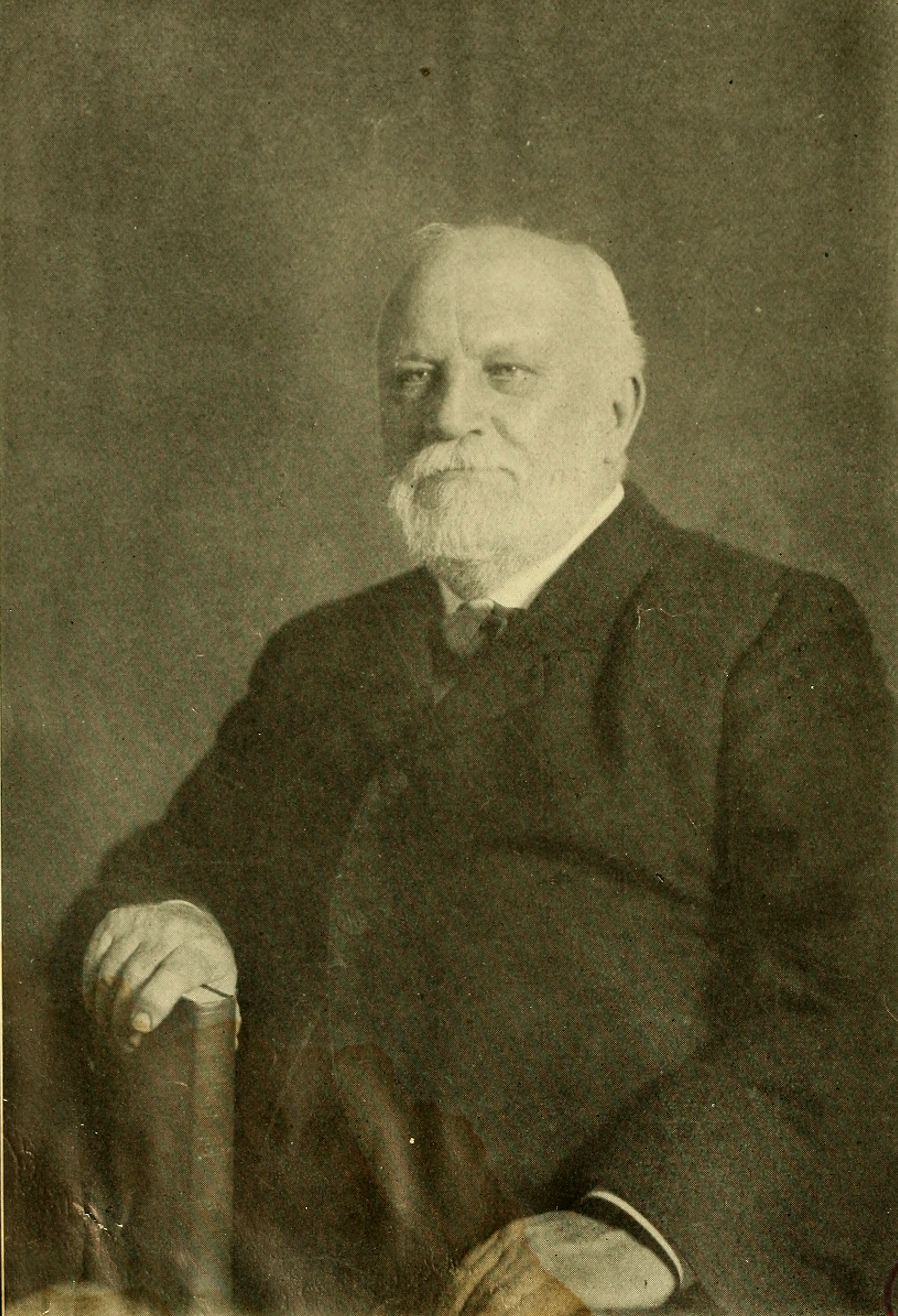
Portrait of James Lyman Whitney

James Lyman Whitney (November 28, 1835 — September 25, 1910) was an American librarian who worked at the Boston Public Library from 1869 to 1910. For the majority of his library career, Whitney was the library catalog head from 1874 to 1899. Prior to this position, Whitney held assistant positions for Cincinnati Public Library and Boston Public Library from 1868 to 1874. After his library catalog position, Whitney was the librarian of Boston Public from 1899 to 1903. He then was in charge of the library's documents and statistics section from 1903 until his death in 1910.

Outside of Boston Public, Whitney had experience in book publishing and bookselling from the late 1850s to late 1860s. During the late 1870s, Whitney was a co-founding organizer of the American Library Association. With the ALA, he was a board member during the 1870s to 1890s. He was also the organization's treasurer from 1882 to 1886.

== Early life and education ==
On November 28, 1835, Whitney was born in Northampton, Massachusetts. Some of his siblings were Josiah Dwight Whitney and William Dwight Whitney. Throughout the 1850s, Whitney attended Yale University for a Bachelor of Arts.

During his time at Yale, Whitney joined the Yale Banner as a newspaper editor at the start of his post-secondary education. He then became a library assistant before working for the Brothers in Unity as their librarian. In the 1860s, Whitney returned to Yale for a Master of Arts.

== Career ==
With Wiley & Halsted, Whitney briefly worked in New York for the book publishing company when he started his career in 1857. The following year, Whitney switched to bookselling in Springfield, Massachusetts when he was hired by Bridgman & Company. After the company was renamed to Bridgman & Whitney, he continued to work there until 1868. With W. F. Adams, Whitney became co-owner of the Old Corner Bookstore in the early 1870s. Whitney continued to co-own the Springfield bookstore leading up to the mid 1880s before ending his retail career in 1887.

For his library career, Whitney started out as a library assistant at Cincinnati Public Library in 1868 before joining the Boston Public Library in 1869. From 1869 to 1874, Whitney worked with the library catalog in assistant positions for Justin Winsor and William Adolphus Wheeler. During this time period, Whitney built a card catalog for the Boston library alongside Wheeler in 1871. When Wheeler died in 1874, Whitney was selected as the library catalog's head and also given a junior position under the superintendent.

During his tenure with the library catalog, Whitney built a catalog in 1879 of posthumously donated Portuguese and Spanish books from George Ticknor. Whitney also expanded the library catalog and was an editor on various works by the library. In 1898, Whitney opined his beliefs against a complete published library catalog with his work titled "Considerations as to a Printed Catalogue in Book Form".

In March 1899, Whitney became the librarian for Boston Public in a temporary position. He later was named Boston Public's permanent librarian in December 1899. While working as librarian, Whitney created a manuscript section for the library. While is his librarian position in 1902, Whitney said "the selection should be more careful" in a Boston Globe article titled Are There Too Many Novels in Our Public Libraries? Whitney continued to hold his librarian position until he was replaced by Horace G. Wadlin in 1903. After ending his librarian tenure, Whitney became in charge of a section dedicated to statistics and governmental documents for the Boston Library in 1903. In this section, Whitney worked on assembling a manuscript catalogue for the Boston library. He continued to work with data and documents until his death in 1910.

With the American Library Association, Whitney was a co-founding organizer in 1876. When the ALA became official in 1879, Whitney joined a board of directors for the organization with four other members. He was renominated to the board in 1881 and 1883. While with the ALA, Whitney was the organization's treasurer from 1882 to 1886. Whitney became in charge of a newly created board on cataloging materials for the ALA in 1886. In 1890, Whitney was selected as one of the members of a revised ALA committee. Apart from the ALA, Whitney was in charge of a committee for a Concord, Massachusetts school from 1879 to 1887.

== Death and personal life ==
On September 25, 1910, Whitney died from a stroke in Cambridge, Massachusetts.
