= Silas Selleck =

American businessman and photographer (1828–1885)

- Born: Silas Wright Selleck; November 26, 1827; Putnam County, New York, U.S.
- Died: June 17, 1885 (aged 57); Sacramento, California, U.S.
- Resting place: San Francisco Columbarium
- Occupations: Businessman; photographer
- Spouse: Sarah Elizabeth Selleck
- Children: 3

Silas Wright Selleck (November 26, 1827 – June 17, 1885) was an American businessman and photographer. He was the proprietor of the Bay View Park Hotel in San Francisco (Bayview Park, San Francisco). Yale University has a collection of his work in their archives. His work includes daguerreotypes and ambrotypes.

== Early life ==
Selleck was born on November 26, 1827, in Putnam County, New York.

== Career ==
He assisted photographer Henry Sherman Beals in Sacramento. After a fire in Sacramento he partnered with George Howard Johnson in San Francsico.

He had a photographic gallery at 415 Montgomery Street in San Francisco called the Cosmopolitan Gallery.

In 1863, he photographed the chief of the California Geological Survey, Josiah Whitney. Clarence King and the Field Party of 1864 is an albumen silver print he took that is in the National Portrait Gallery.

His portraits include cartes de visite. Thomas Almond Ayers overpainted one of his photographs.

== Personal life and death ==
He had a wife Sarah Elizabeth Selleck, a son, and two daughters.

He died on June 17, 1885, in Sacramento, California and is buried in the San Francisco Columbarium.

== Work ==
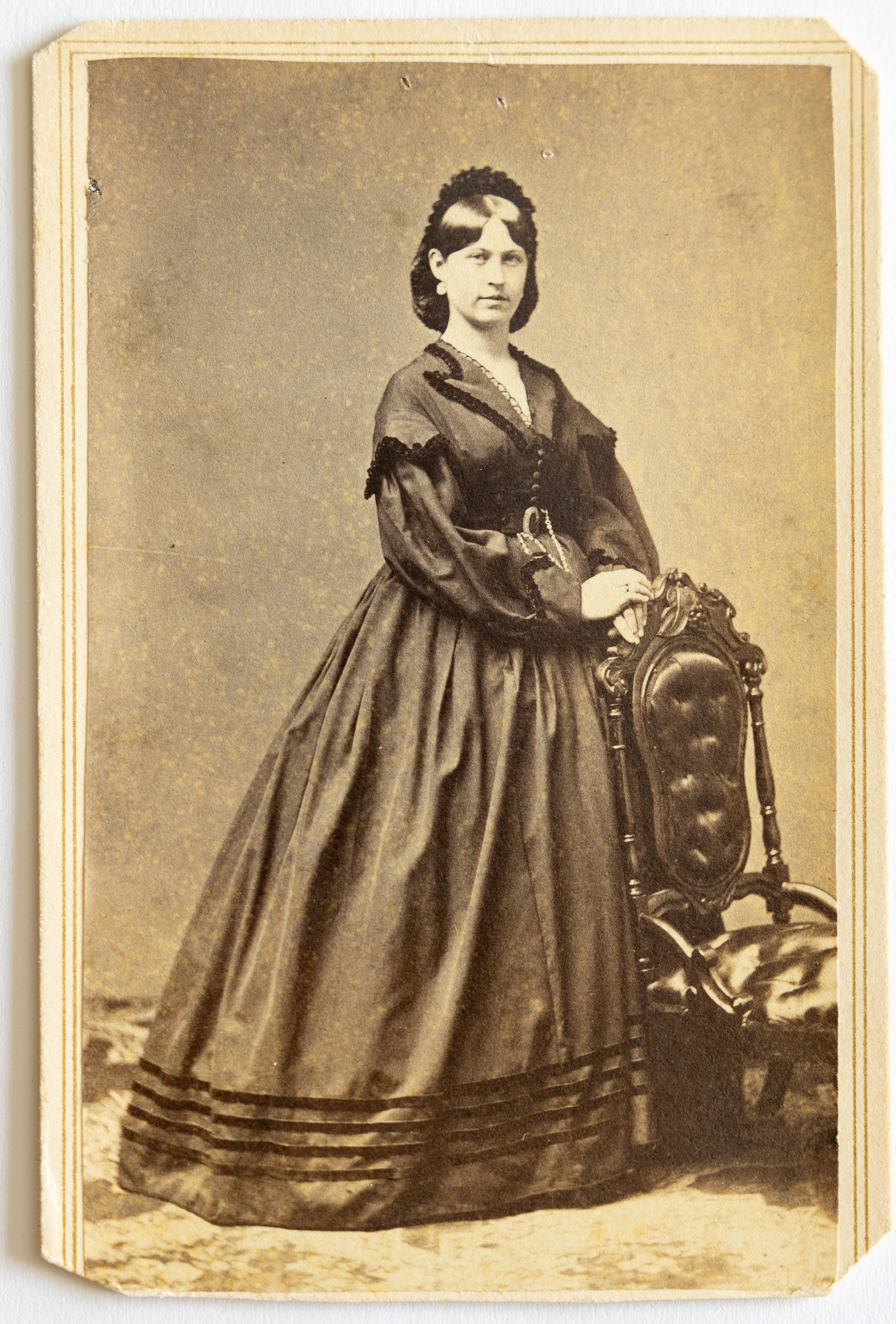
Unidentified woman

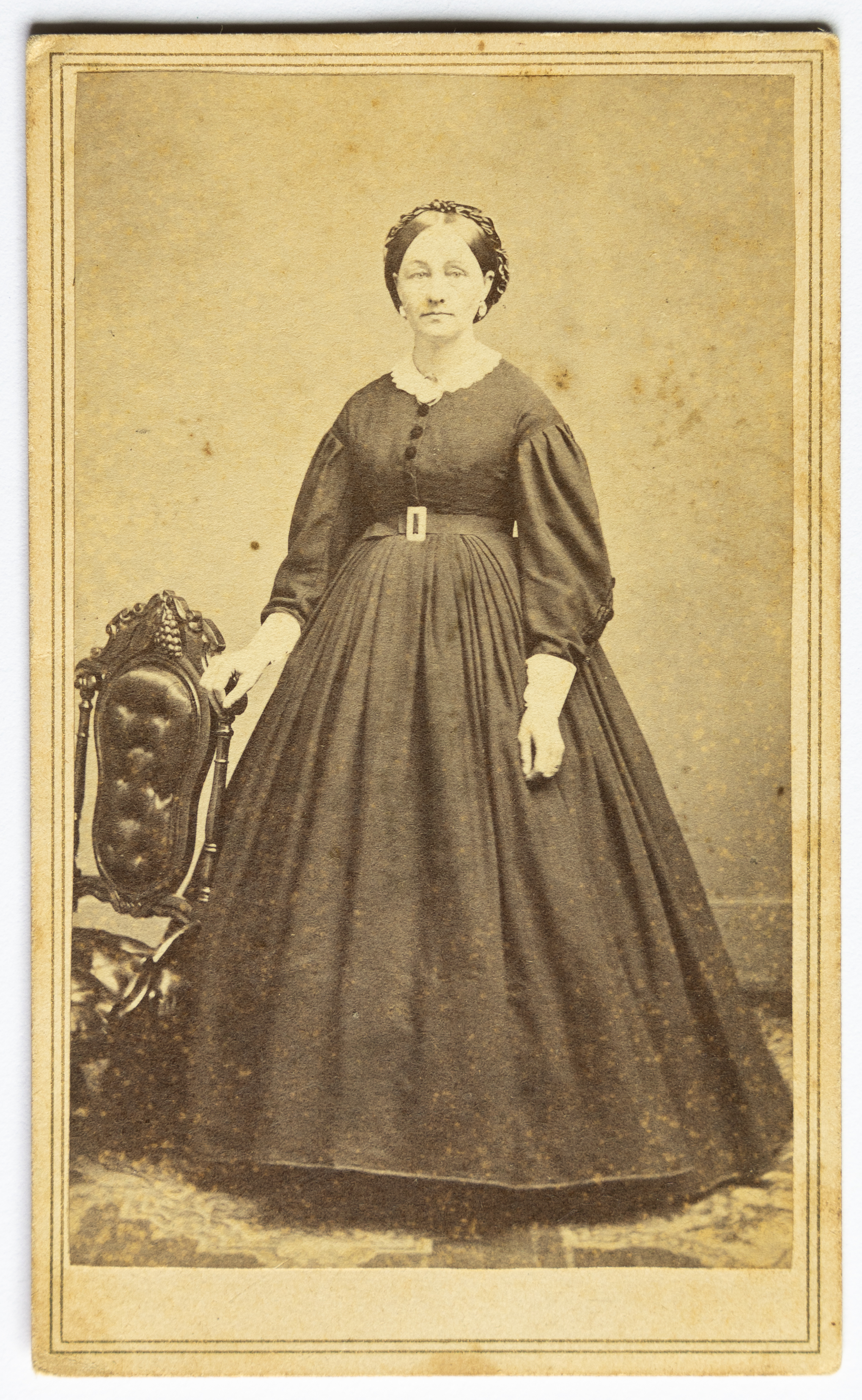
Unidentified woman

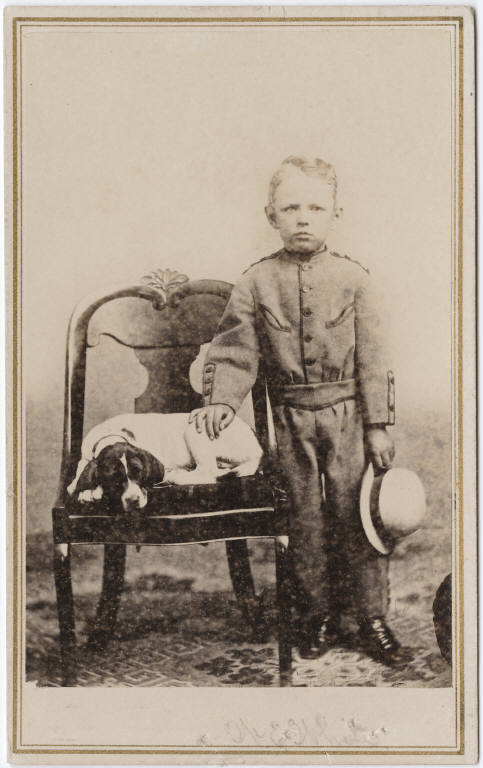
A boy and his dog

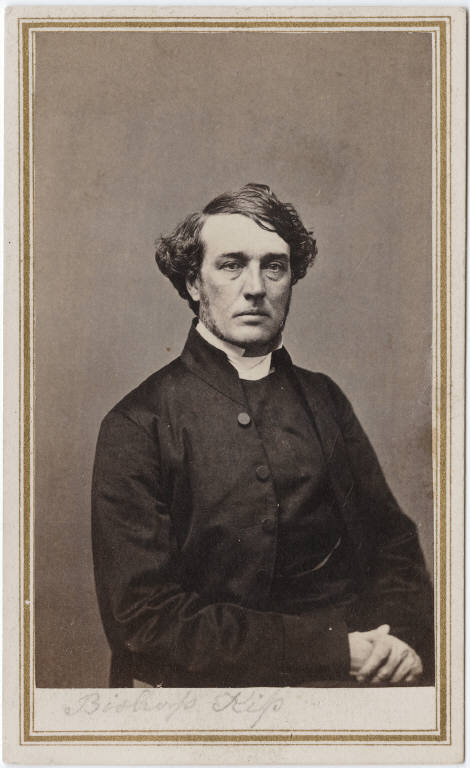
Bishop William Ingraham Kip

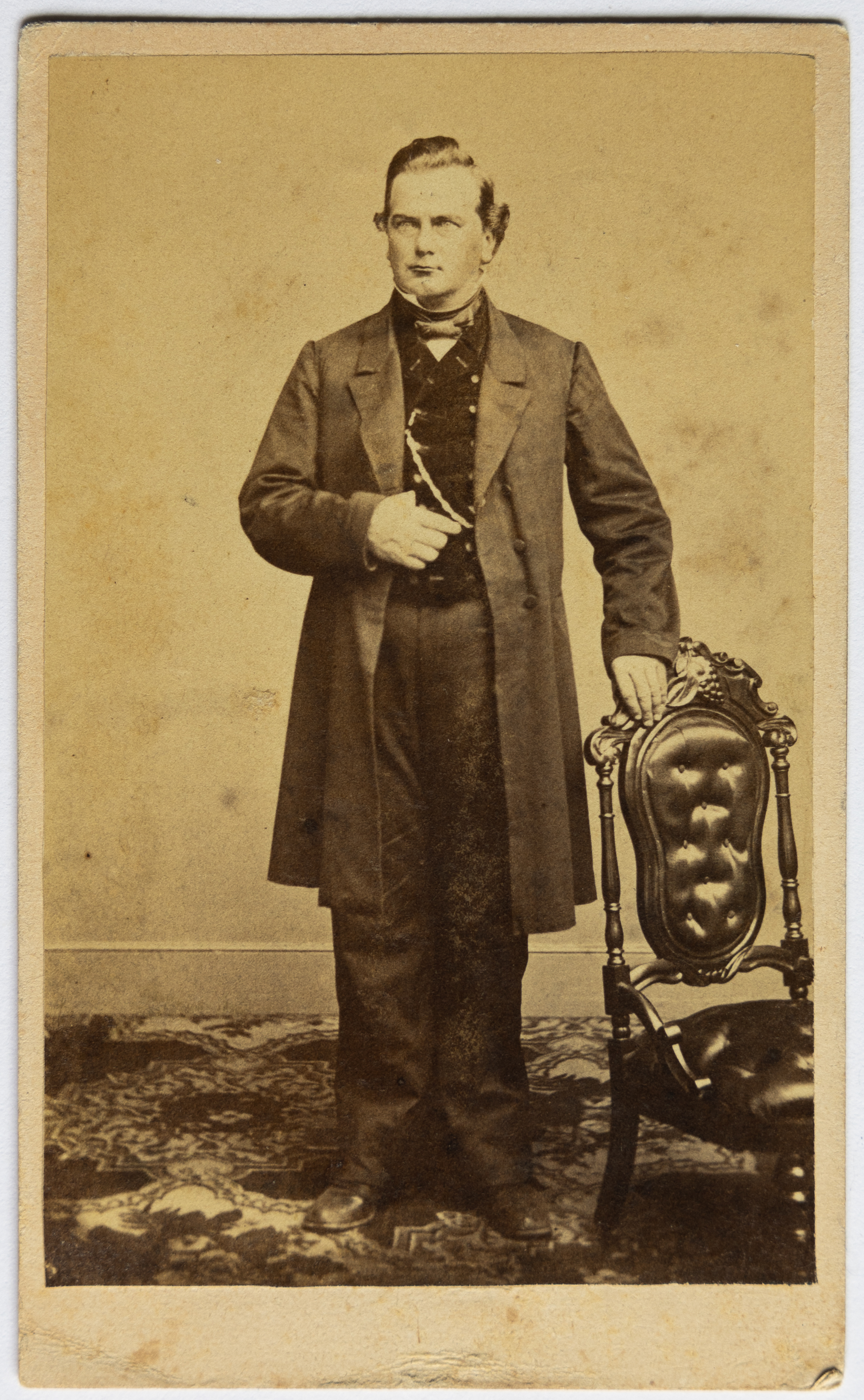
Unidentified man

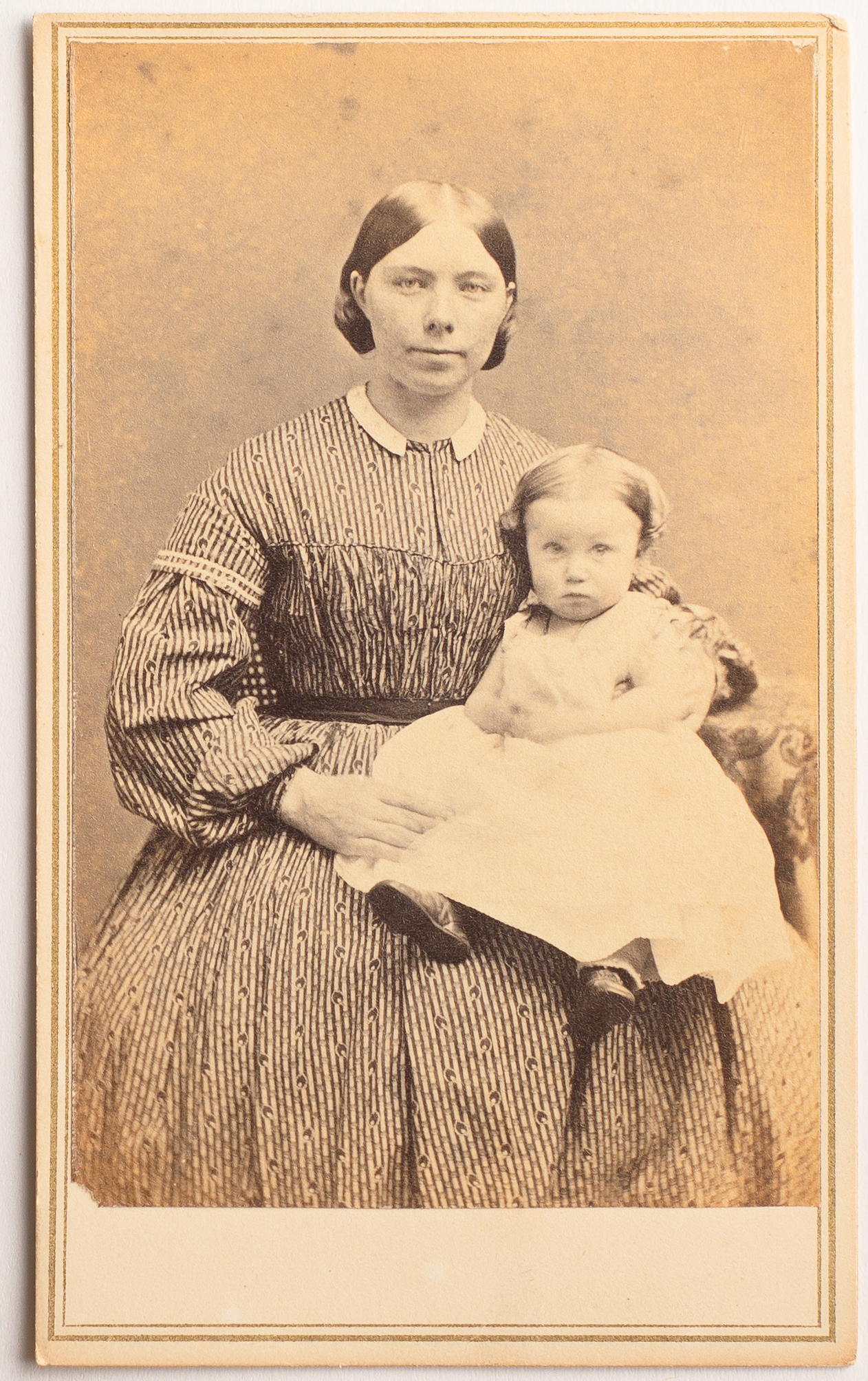

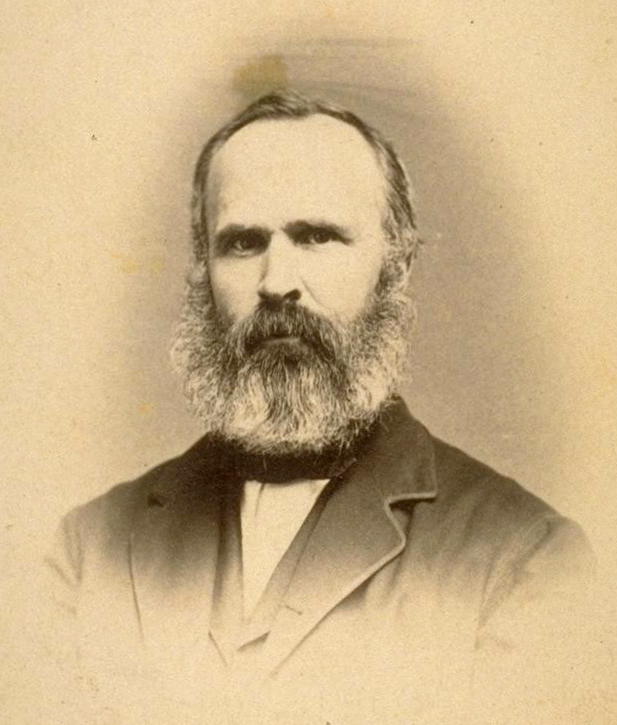
Josiah Whitney
