= Island of California =

Phantom island

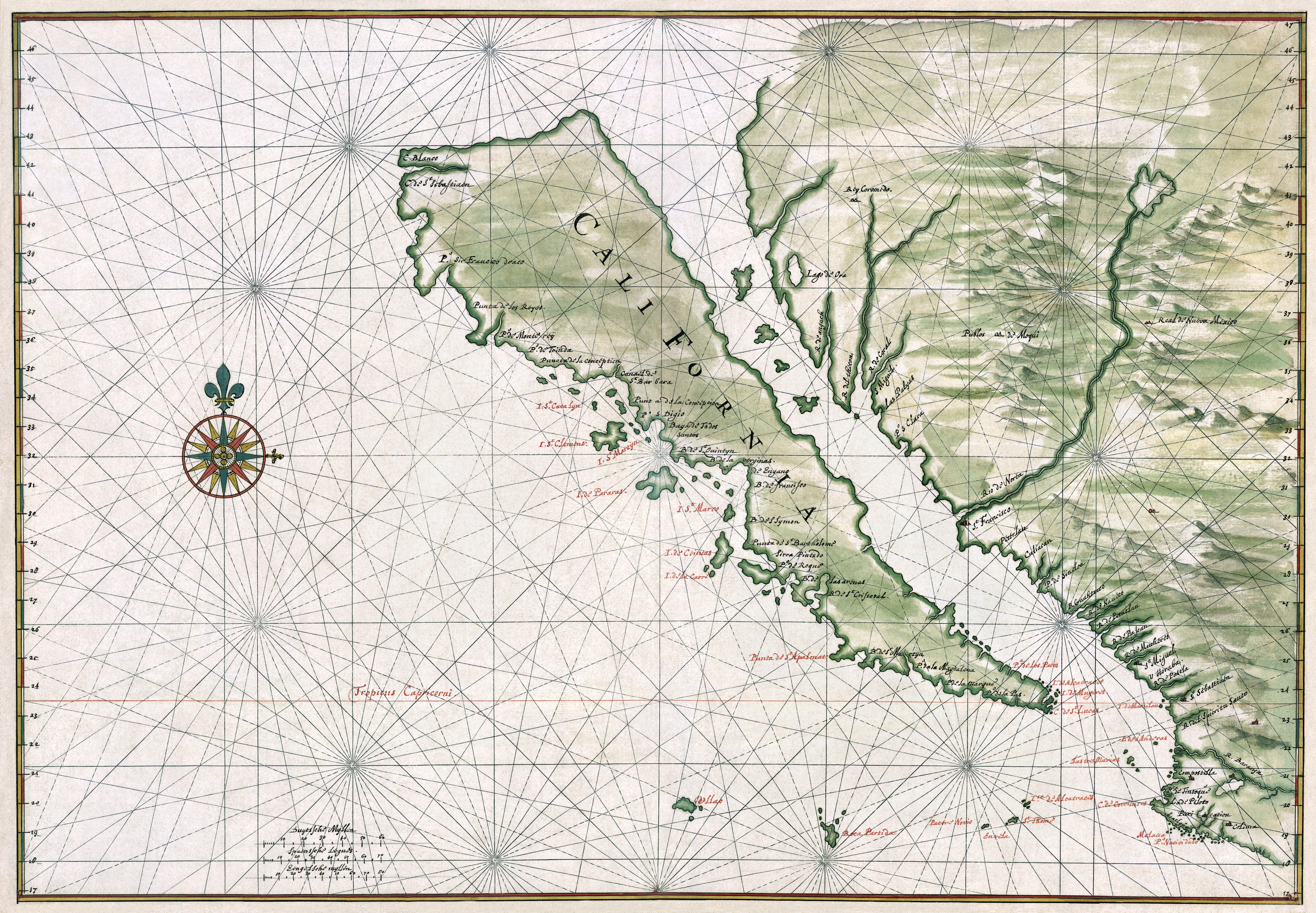
Map of California, c. 1650, by Johannes Vingboons (restored)

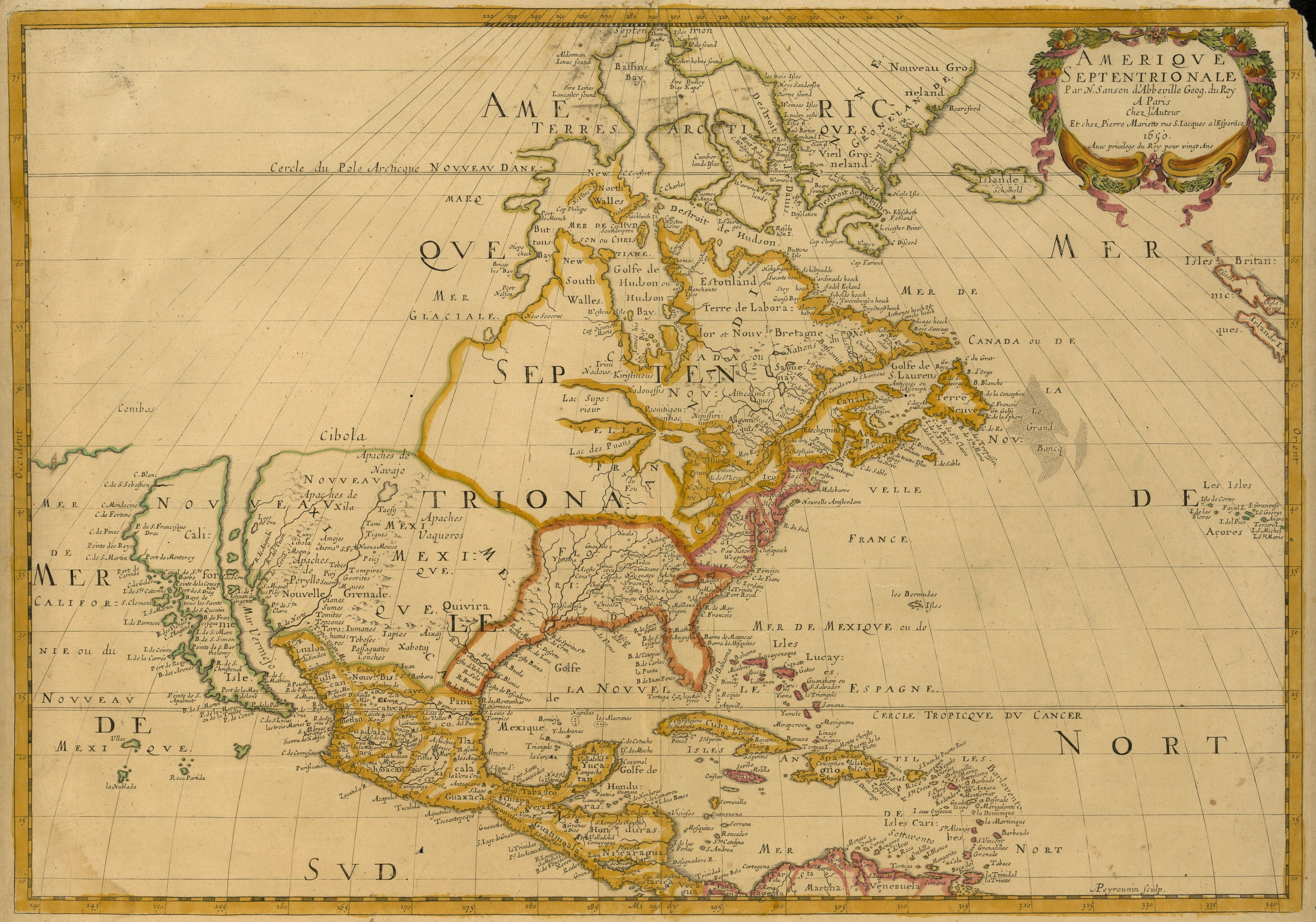
The "Island of California", on a 1650 map by Nicolas Sanson

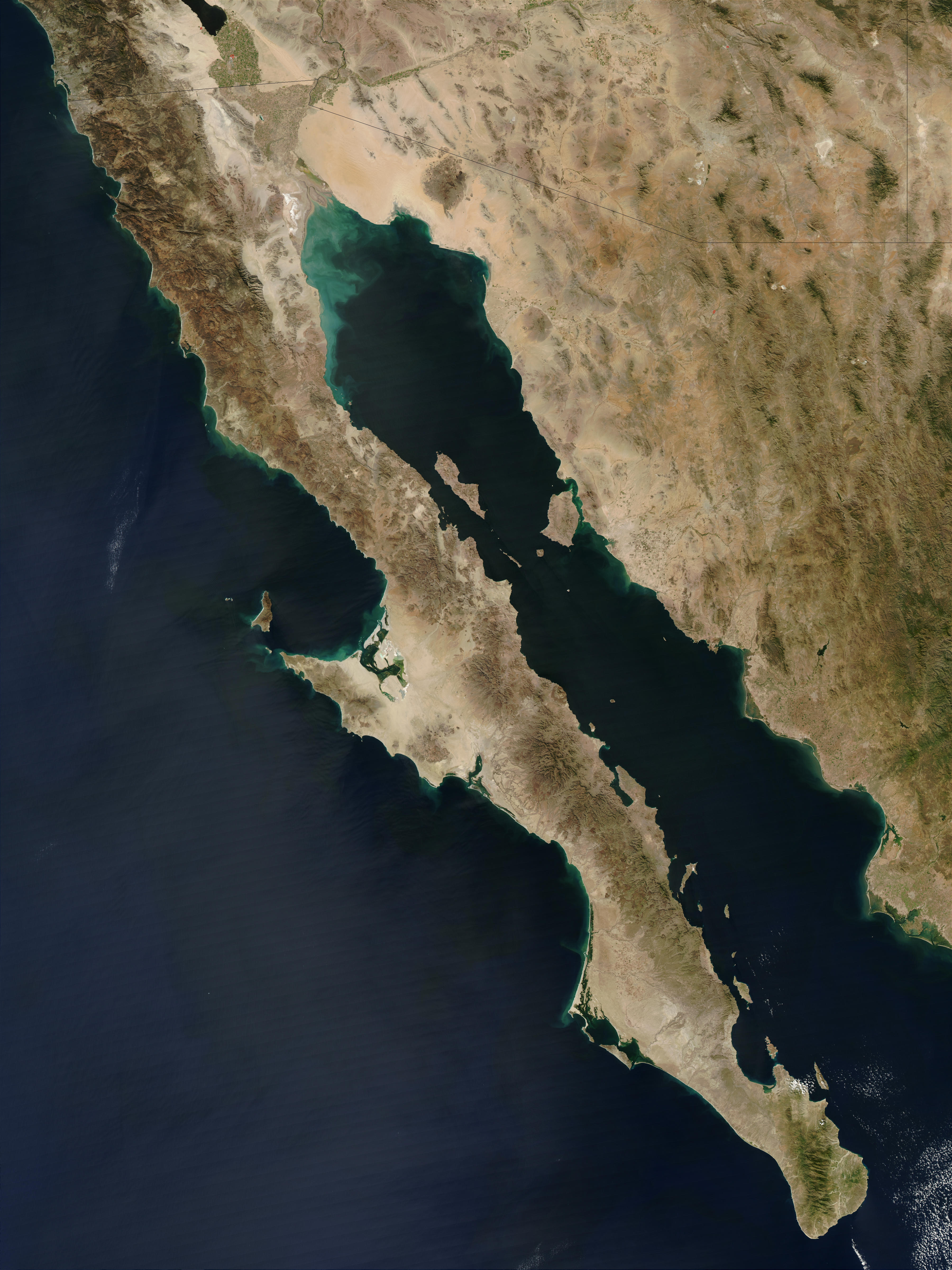
A satellite view of the Baja California peninsula and the Gulf of California

Island of California (Spanish: Isla de California) refers to the long-held global misconception, dating from the 16th century, that the California region was not part of mainland North America but rather a large island separated from the continent by a strait now known to be the Gulf of California.

One of the most famous cartographic errors in history, it was propagated on many maps during the 17th and 18th centuries, despite contradictory evidence from various explorers. The legend was initially infused with the idea that California was a terrestrial paradise, like the Garden of Eden or Atlantis populated entirely by Amazonian women and protected by griffins. This mapping error was not a one-off event. From the mid-1500s to the late 1700s great controversy surrounded the geography of California. For instance, a Spanish map from 1548 depicts California as a peninsula, Historian Dora Beale Polk argued that the belief was perpetuated through "uncritical repetition", and that California appeared regularly as an island on maps beginning in 1622. A 1626 Portuguese map depicts the land as a peninsula, while a 1630 British map depicts it as an island. A French map from 1682 only shows the tip of the Baja Peninsula. There are slightly over 1,000 maps in Stanford's Glen McLaughlin Collection of California as an Island, the largest collection of such maps in the world.

== History ==
The first known mention of the legend of the "Island of California" was in the 1510 romance novel Las sergas de Esplandián by Garci Rodríguez de Montalvo—the sequel to Montalvo's more famous tales of Amadís de Gaula, father of Esplandian. He described the island in this passage:

Know, that on the right hand of the Indies there is an island called California very close to the side of the Terrestrial Paradise; and it is peopled by black women, without any man among them, for they live in the manner of Amazons.

It is thought that, because of the widespread popularity of Las sergas de Esplandián at the time of European exploration of California, that it is reasonable that the book inspired the naming of California. The book's description is also thought to have prompted early explorers to misidentify the Baja California peninsula as the island in these legends.

In 1533, Fortún Ximénez, a mutineer on an exploring expedition sent by Hernán Cortés, discovered the southern portion of Baja California, around present-day La Paz. He was killed by natives but his men returned to New Spain and reported on their find. In 1535, Cortés arrived in the bay there and named the area Santa Cruz; he attempted to start a colony but abandoned his efforts after several years due to logistical problems. Cortés' limited information on southern Baja California apparently led to the naming of the region after the legendary California and to an initial but short-lived assumption that it was a large island.

In 1539, Cortés sent the navigator Francisco de Ulloa northward along the Gulf and Pacific coasts of Baja California. Ulloa reached the mouth of the Colorado River at the head of the Gulf, which seemed to prove that the region was a peninsula rather than an island. Ulloa was quoted as having described the land he saw on his expedition as, "High and bare, of wretched aspect without any verdure." An expedition under Hernando de Alarcón ascended the lower Colorado River and confirmed Ulloa's finding. Maps published subsequently in Europe during the 16th century, including those by Gerardus Mercator in 1538 and Abraham Ortelius in 1570, correctly showed Baja California as a peninsula.

Despite the existence of maps correctly showing California attached to the mainland of North America, maps showing California as an island began to show up in the early 1600s. Rather than many cartographers independently making the same mistake, it is thought that maps of California as an island spread due to copying in the early 1600s, since it is known that cartographers of the time frequently made copies of other maps. Carmelite friar Antonio de la Ascensión, a Spanish priest attached to a voyage of Sebastián Vizcaíno, was the first known person to depict California as an island in 1603. On the return voyage to Acapulco, Mexico, Friar Antonio's ship was overtaken by Dutch pirates who found and confiscated a map drawn by him that depicted California as an island, effectively leaking state-secret information. Spain was not in the habit of willingly sharing information about their expeditions—in fact, maps produced by Sebastián Vizcaíno, the leader of the expedition that brought friar Antonio de la Ascensión to California, were not published until 1802, two hundred years after the expedition occurred. Shortly after the map was confiscated from Friar Antonio's ship, Dutch maps were published depicting California as an island.

In 1622 the British mathematician Henry Briggs published a pamphlet containing a map showing California as an island, which spread the idea throughout Europe. The bottom left corner of his map says, "California, sometimes supposed to be a part of the western continent, but since by a Spanish chart taken from Hollanders, it is found to be a goodly island". This stolen map was Friar Antonio's, and this quote provides evidence for the spread of knowledge of California as an island. As the Dutch were reputable cartographers, it is thought that word of California as an island began to spread, as the majority of maps depicting California as an island were published after 1622. Throughout the 1600s, the Dutch, Japanese, French, Germans, British, and more all drew California as an island.

Another contributing factor may have been the second voyage of Juan de Fuca in 1592. De Fuca claimed to have explored the western coast of North America and to have found a large opening that possibly connected to the Atlantic Ocean—the legendary Northwest Passage. Finding a Northwest Passage was something that motivated many of the explorers coming to the California coast at the time, as it would be extremely profitable for Europe if a northern trade route to Asia could be found. In fact, explorers like Sebastián Vizcaíno were operating under orders to sail north until they found the Northwest Passage, and only to turn around if the coast veered northwest, which would imply that there was no waterway and the land was actually connected to Asia. De Fuca's claim remains controversial because there is only one surviving written account of it found, his account as related to an Englishman, Michael Locke. Nonetheless, this account claims de Fuca found a large strait, with a large island at its mouth, at around 47° north latitude. The Strait of Juan de Fuca is in fact at around 48° N, as is the southern tip of the large island now called Vancouver Island, while the northern reach of the Gulf of California terminates much farther south, at about 31° N. It is possible that explorers and mapmakers in the 17th century could have confused the two (if, in fact, they were aware of de Fuca's voyage), and in any case further exploration was inevitable. Indeed, the famed British explorer James Cook narrowly missed the Strait of Juan de Fuca in March 1778, almost 200 years later. Cook even named Cape Flattery (at the northwest tip of modern Washington state) which is at the mouth of the strait, and stopped in Nootka Sound just off the west coast of Vancouver Island at about 49° N. His account states "we saw nothing like [the Strait of Juan de Fuca]; nor is there the least probability that ever any such thing existed." However, Cook describes some bad weather in his account around this time, and did continue on to map most of the outer Pacific coastline of North America from modern-day northern California to the Bering Strait in Alaska on the same voyage.

A key role in changing ideas about California seems to have been played by an overland expedition led by the founding governor of Santa Fe de Nuevo México, Juan de Oñate. The expedition descended the Colorado River in 1604 and 1605, and its participants believed that they saw the Gulf of California continuing off to the northwest (presumably behind the Sierra de Los Cucapah into the Laguna Salada Basin and Lake Cahuilla, but was more likely due to the California flood of 1605, in which the flooded Central and Indio Valley basins did essentially appear to extend the peninsula hundreds of miles northward).

Further evidence of the superflood theory can be found in the account of Nicolás de Cardona, who sailed up the Gulf of California in 1619 to determine if a pearl fishery would prove viable in the region. In his account of the voyage, Cardona claims to have sailed as far north as 34° N, where he observed that the sea continued to separate California from the mainland, writing near the end of his account that “it is now proven that California is a very large island and not part of the continent.” A day prior to this observation, Cardona recorded the passage of a severe storm that nearly drowned the crew, and which may have led to the temporary extension of the Gulf.

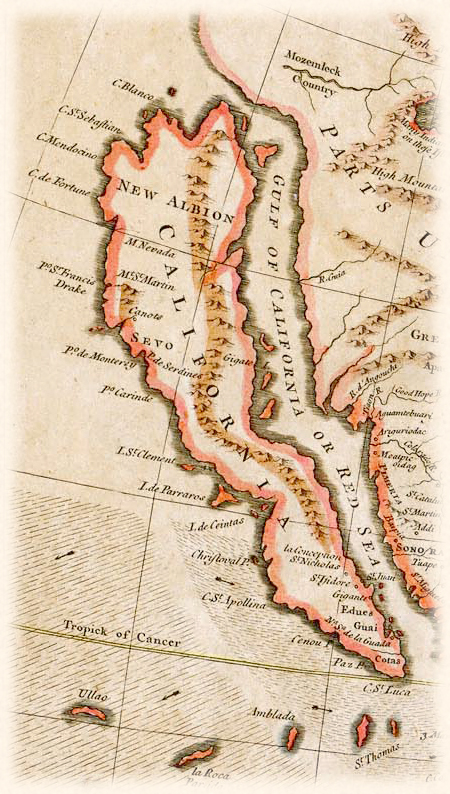
An English map depicting California as an island (1745)

Reports from Oñate's expedition reached Antonio de la Ascención, a Carmelite friar who had participated in Sebastián Vizcaíno's explorations of the west coast of California in 1602 and 1603. Ascención was a tireless propagandist in favor of Spanish settlement in California, and his later writings referred to the region as an island. As older maps confirm, Spanish authorities and local residents were well aware where the actual northern terminus of the Gulf of California lay, but by extending the coastline north past Cape Mendocino and eventually even into Puget Sound, Francis Drake's claim of Nova Albion for England (1579) could be invalidated by the priority of Cortes' claim (1533).

The Jesuit missionary and cartographer Eusebio Francisco Kino revived the fact that Baja California was a peninsula. While studying in Europe, Kino had accepted the insularity of California, but when he reached Mexico he began to have doubts. He made a series of overland expeditions from northern Sonora to areas within or near the Colorado River's delta in 1698–1706, in part to provide a practical route between the Jesuits' missions in Sonoran and Baja California but also to resolve the geographical question. Kino satisfied himself that a land connection must exist, and the 18th century Jesuits generally followed his example. The first report of Kino's discovery and his map from 1701 showing California as a peninsula were sent to Europe by Marko Anton Kappus, a Jesuit missionary from Kamna Gorica (Duchy of Carniola, now Slovenia). In a June 1701 letter, he wrote about that to his friend Philippus Alberth in Vienna and thus acted as an important intermediary in the dissemination of this knowledge. However, Juan Mateo Mange, a military companion on several of Kino's treks, expressed scepticism; European cartographers remained divided on the question.

Jesuit missionary-explorers in Baja California who attempted to lay the issue finally to rest included Juan de Ugarte (1721), Ferdinand Konščak (1746), and Wenceslaus Linck (1766). The matter was settled beyond all dispute when the expeditions of Juan Bautista de Anza traveled between Sonora and the west coast of Alta California in the period of 1774–1776.

== See also ==
- History of the mapping of California
- Etymology of California
