= Francisco de Ulloa =

Spanish explorer (died 1540)

- Pronunciation: Spanish pronunciation: [fɾanˈθisko ðe uˈʎoa]
- Born: unknown
- Died: after 1543
- Occupation: Explorer
- Known for: Exploring the west coast of Mexico

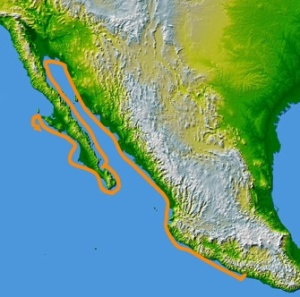
Route of the 1539 voyage by Francisco de Ulloa from (Acapulco) along the west coast of Mexico

Francisco de Ulloa (died after 1543) was a Spanish explorer who explored the west coast of present-day Mexico and the Baja California Peninsula under the commission of Hernán Cortés. Ulloa's voyage was among the first to disprove the cartographic misconception of the existence of the Island of California.

== Biography ==
Little is known about the early life and career of Francisco de Ulloa. He was the son of a military officer serving in the army of Charles V. Ulloa also entered the military and fought in Algiers. At some point he traveled to New Spain and entered the service of Hernán Cortés. It is not known whether he accompanied Cortés on his first voyage to Baja California in 1535. Bernal Díaz del Castillo said that he joined the expedition when the wife of Cortés, Juana de Zuniga, sent Ulloa to deliver important letters to her husband. Ulloa brought two ships loaded with provisions and made contact with Cortés. A small colony was established at Santa Cruz (present-day La Paz) where Cortés had hoped to profit from the nearby pearl fishery. However, few pearls were recovered and when Cortés returned to New Spain, he left Ulloa in charge of the struggling enterprise. Within a year, Ulloa abandoned the site and brought home the survivors of the first colony in California.

Despite these setbacks, Cortés remained hopeful for new discoveries to the north and sponsored another expedition in 1539. Juan de Castellon oversaw the outfitting of three ships at Tehauntepec, the Santa Águeda (120 tons), the Trinidad (35 tons) and theSanto Tomás (20 tons). When he sailed north to Acapulco, Ulloa met them and announced that Cortés had appointed him commander of the fleet. Castellon objected strenuously, even appealing to Cortés who reiterated is instructions that Ulloa was in charge. Castellon relented and was placed in command of one of the smaller ships.

The expedition left port on July 8, 1539 and shortly after setting sail they faced numerous setbacks. The Santa Águeda was damaged by strong winds and forced to undergo repairs until August 23. Four days later the Santo Tomás sank in a storm. The two remaining ships continued to the Gulf of California. Once there, the expedition sailed along the east coast of the Gulf and proceeded north until they reached the mouth of the Colorado River on September 28. Ulloa named the river, Ancón de San Andrés. The river marked the northern limit of the Gulf, disproving the possibility that the peninsula was actually an island. After landing and taking possession of the territory, Ulloa turned south, sailing along the western edge of the Gulf. Upon reaching Santa Cruz, the site of the earlier failed colony, the two ships anchored at Isla Espíritu Santo, to which they seem to have first applied the name "California". Ulloa then continued south until reaching Cape San Lucas, at the southern tip of the Baja California peninsula.

After taking on supplies of wood and water, Ulloa rounded the tip of the peninsula with great difficulty and sailed northward along the Pacific coast of the peninsula. The voyage eventually reached the Isla de Cedros. The fierce winds and high seas he encountered eventually stalled their progress. By April 1540, Ulloa decided they no longer had provisions or sufficient healthy manpower to proceed north with both ships. He sent Castellon back to Acapulco in the Trinidad along with a letter to Cortes detailing the voyage up to that point. He summarized his findings on the Pacific coast by saying, "The land is ugly and barren, as poor here as it was in the parts seen earlier."

Castellon made it safely back to New Spain but the outcome for Ulloa has been less clear. Based on a misreading of the historical accounts, many have assumed that he never returned. However, contemporary chronicler, Bernal Díaz del Castillo, stated that Ulloa returned to port but was killed by a crew member in 1540. In the 20th century, historian Henry Raup Wagner uncovered legal documents showing that Ulloa was alive in Spain in 1541. In 1543, Cortés indicated that he believed Ulloa was alive as part of a legal investigation as to the whereabouts of the daughter of one of his former pilots, stating that "Ulloa had carried her off and could give the information better than he."

Although his discoveries showed that Baja California is a peninsula, legends and maps depicting California as an island persisted intermittently into the 18th century.
