= William Dwight Whitney =

American linguist

William D. Whitney
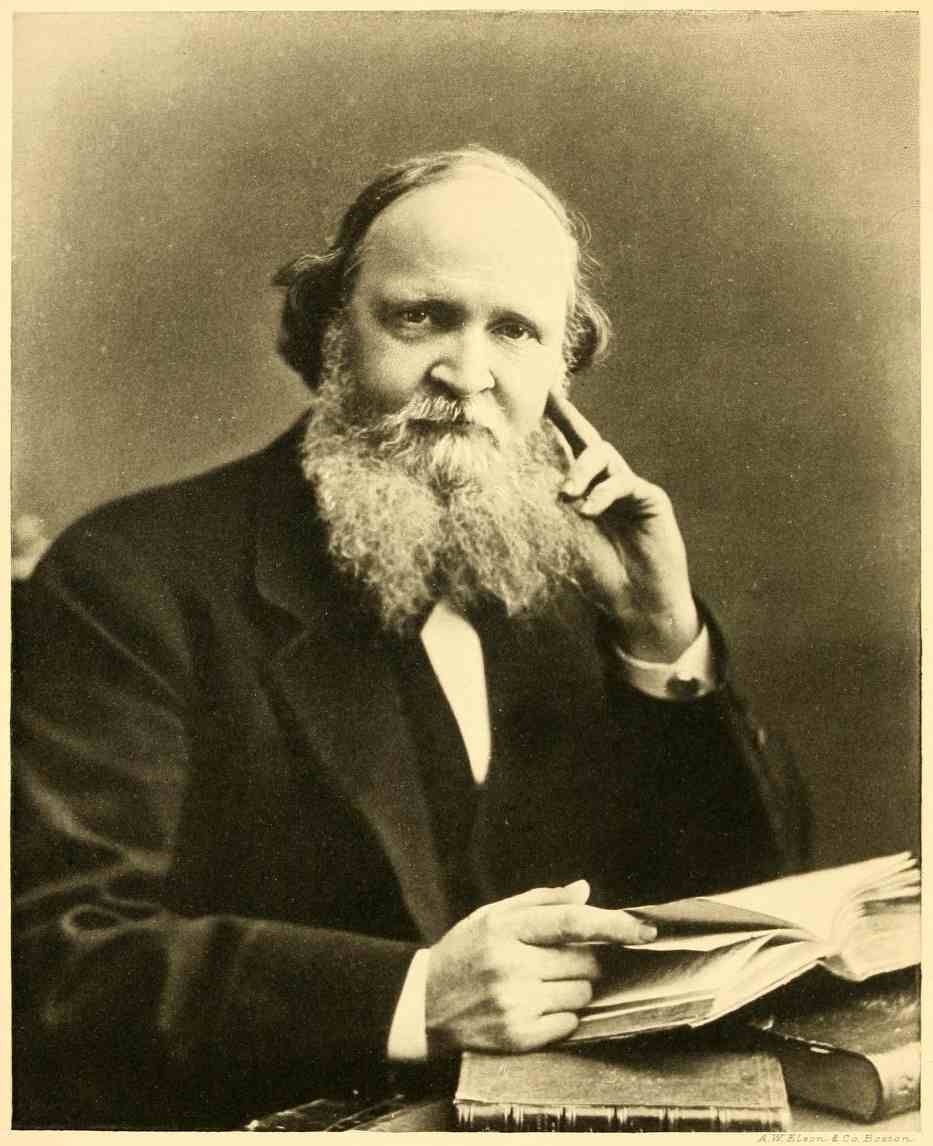
- Portrait of Whitney
- Born: William Dwight Whitney; February 9, 1827; Northampton, Massachusetts, U.S.
- Died: June 7, 1894 (aged 67); New Haven, Connecticut, U.S.
- Education: Williams College; University of Berlin; University of Tübingen; University of Breslau
- Occupations: Linguist, philologist
- Employer: Yale University
- Spouse: Elizabeth Wooster Baldwin
- Children: Edwin Baldwin; Williston Clapp; Marian Parker; Roger Sherman Baldwin; Emily Henrietta; Margaret Dwight
- Relatives: Whitney family

Signature
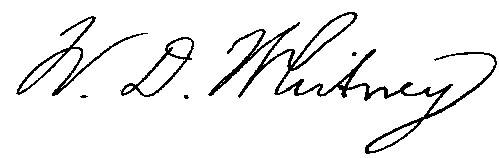

William Dwight Whitney (February 9, 1827 – June 7, 1894) was an American linguist, philologist, and lexicographer known for his work on Sanskrit grammar and Vedic philology as well as his influential view of language as a social institution. He was the first president of the American Philological Association and editor-in-chief of The Century Dictionary.

== Life ==
William Dwight Whitney was born in Northampton, Massachusetts, on February 9, 1827. His father was Josiah Dwight Whitney (1786–1869) of the New England Dwight family. His mother was Sarah Williston (1800–1833) of Easthampton, Massachusetts. He had multiple siblings, including Josiah Whitney and James Lyman Whitney.

Whitney entered Williams College at fifteen, graduating in 1845. He continued studying and worked at a bank in Northampton for several years. He was at first interested in natural sciences, and assisted his older brother Josiah on a geological survey of the Lake Superior region in 1849, having charge of the botany, the barometrical observations and the accounts. On this expedition, he began the study of Sanskrit in his leisure hours. Around this time Whitney was living at Yale University in Connecticut.

In 1850, Whitney left the United States to study philology, and especially Sanskrit, in Germany. There, he spent his winters at Berlin studying under Franz Bopp and Albrecht Weber, and his summers were devoted to research under Rudolph von Roth at Tübingen. It was during his time in Germany that Whitney began a major life project, "preparation of an edition and translation of the Atharva-veda."

He gained wide reputation for his scholarship in the field. In 1853, Yale University offered Whitney a position as "Professor of Sanskrit", a position made just for him and the first of its kind in the United States. It was not until 1861, however, that he received his doctoral degree from the University of Breslau. He also taught modern languages at the Sheffield Scientific School, and served as secretary to the American Oriental Society from 1857 until he became its president in 1884. The American Philosophical Society elected Whitney to membership in 1863.

On August 28, 1856, Whitney married Elizabeth Wooster Baldwin. She was the daughter of Roger Sherman Baldwin, US Senator and Governor of the State of Connecticut. They had six children:

1. Edward Baldwin Whitney was born August 16, 1857, became Assistant US Attorney General, and had son mathematician Hassler Whitney.
2. Williston Clapp Whitney was born April 2, 1859, but died March 11, 1861.
3. Marian Parker Whitney was born February 6, 1861, became a professor of German at Vassar College and trustee of Connecticut College for Women
4. Roger Sherman Baldwin Whitney was born January 6, 1863, but died January 17, 1874.
5. Emily Henrietta Whitney was born August 29, 1864.
6. Margaret Dwight Whitney was born November 19, 1866.

He died at his home, on Whitney Avenue, on June 7, 1894.

== Career ==
Whitney revised definitions for the 1864 edition of Webster's American Dictionary, and in 1869 became a founder and first president of the American Philological Association. In the same year he also became Yale's professor of comparative philology. Whitney also gave instruction in French and German in the college until 1867, and in the Sheffield scientific school until 1886. He wrote metrical translations of the Vedas, and numerous papers on the Vedas and linguistics, many of which were collected in the Oriental and Linguistic Studies series (1872–74). He wrote several books on language, and grammar textbooks of English, French, German, and Sanskrit.

His Sanskrit Grammar (1879) is notable in part for the criticism it contains of the Aṣṭādhyāyī, the Sanskrit grammar attributed to Pāṇini. Whitney describes the Ashtadhyayi as "containing the facts of the language cast into the highly artful and difficult form of about four thousand algebraic-like rules (in the statement and arrangement of which brevity alone is had in view at the cost of distinctness and unambiguousness)."

In his Course in General Linguistics in the chapter on the 'Immutability and Mutability of the Sign', Ferdinand de Saussure credits Whitney with insisting on the arbitrary nature of linguistic signs.

The linguist Roman Jakobson (Jakobson 1965, 23-4) remarks that Whitney exerted a deep influence on European linguistic thought by promoting the thesis of language as a social institution. In his fundamental books of the 1860s and 1870s, language was defined as a system of arbitrary and conventional signs. This doctrine was borrowed and expanded by Ferdinand de Saussure, and it entered into the posthumous edition of his 'Course', adjusted by his disciples C. Bally and Albert Sechehaye (1916). The teacher declares: "On the essential point it seems to us that the American linguist is right: language is a convention, and the nature of the sign that is agreed upon remains indifferent." Jakobson writes, Arbitrariness is posited as the first of two basic principles for defining the nature of the verbal sign: "The bond uniting the signifier with the signified is arbitrary." The commentary points out that no one has controverted this principle "but it is often easier to discover a truth than to assign to it the appropriate place."

Although he suffered from a heart ailment in his later years, he was editor-in-chief of the first edition of the respected Century Dictionary, which appeared from 1889 to 1891.

== Honors ==
- Elected a Fellow of the American Academy of Arts and Sciences in 1860.
- Elected a member of the American Antiquarian Society in 1868.
- Elected foreign knight of the Prussian order Pour le Mérite for science and arts in 1881.

== Works ==
- Atharva Veda, editor with Rudolf von Roth (1856–1857)
- Language and the Study of Language: Twelve Lectures on the Principles of Linguistic Science (1867)
- Taittiriya Pratisakhya, editor and translator (1868)
- A Compendious German Grammar (1869, 6th edn. 1888)
- On Material and Form in Language (1872)
- Oriental and Linguistic Studies — First Series: The Veda, The Avesta, The Science of Language (1872)
- Oriental and Linguistic Studies — Second Series: The East and West, Religion and Mythology, Hindu Astronomy (1874)
- Darwinism and Language (1874)
- The Life and Growth of Language: An Outline of Linguistic Science (1875)
- Essentials of English Grammar for the Use of Schools (1877)*
- Sanskrit Grammar: Including Both the Classical Language, and the Older Dialects, of Veda and Brahmana (1879, 2d edn. 1889)
- Language and its Study: with Special Reference to the Indo-European (lectures) (1880)*
- Logical Consistency in Views of Language (1880)
- Mixture in Language (1881)
- A Brief German Grammar (1885)
- The Roots, Verb-forms and Primary Derivatives of the Sanskrit Language (supplement to Sanskrit Grammar) (1885)
- Practical French Grammar (1887)*
- A Compendious German and English Dictionary (1887)*
- The Century Dictionary (editor) (1889–1891)
- Introductory French Reader (1891)*
- Max Müller and the Science of Language: A Criticism (1892)
- Atharva Veda Samhita 3 volumes (translator)
- The History of Sanskrit Grammar (Indian reprint edition of Sanskrit Grammar)
- Manuscript Diary (photo reprint)

NB: Dates marked * may not be first publication.

=== Modern collections ===
- Oriental and Linguistic Essays
- On the Vedas
- Whitney on Language: Selected Writings of William Dwight Whitney
