= Watson Andrews Goodyear =

American geologist

Watson Andrews Goodyear (1839 – April 10, 1891) was an American geologist.

Goodyear, the son of Chauncey Goodyear, Jr. and Maria Goodyear, was born in Hamden, New Haven County, Connecticut. He graduated from the Sheffield Scientific School of Yale College in 1863. He was employed immediately after graduation in the translation of a portion of Theodor Bodemann's Anleitung zur Probierkunst, and in the spring of 1865 he and Theodore A. Blake went to California, in a partnership as Civil and Mining Engineers which was not dissolved until the spring of 1875. In the meantime he did much other independent and special work in the line of his profession. He was employed, for instance, for some months in 1866-7 on a topographical survey in the vicinity of the Cliff House, San Francisco. In April, 1870, he entered the service of the Geological Survey of California, under Professor J. D. Whitney, and was actively employed until the close of the season of 1873, when that Survey was stopped. Most of his work in this connection has appeared in the publications of the Survey. At a later date he was employed in the State Survey of California. The collection of specimens of rocks made by him in these years formed the principal part of the collection belonging to the University of California. In 1877 he published in San Francisco a volume on the Coal Mines of the Western Coast of the United States. In 1877 he returned to Connecticut but soon went back again to California, and in the fall of 1879 went to the Republic of El Salvador as State Geologist. While there he had the opportunity of observing a remarkable series of earthquakes, a detailed account of which he published at Panama in 1880. In the spring of 1881 he returned from San Salvador, and he remained in the vicinity of New Haven until 1885 or 1886, when he resumed the practice of his profession in California. He was subsequently employed as geologist of the State Mineralogical Bureau.

He died in San Francisco on April 10, 1891, at the age of 52.

This article incorporates public domain material from the 1891 Yale Obituary Record.
