= Rudolf von Roth =

German Indologist (1821–1895)

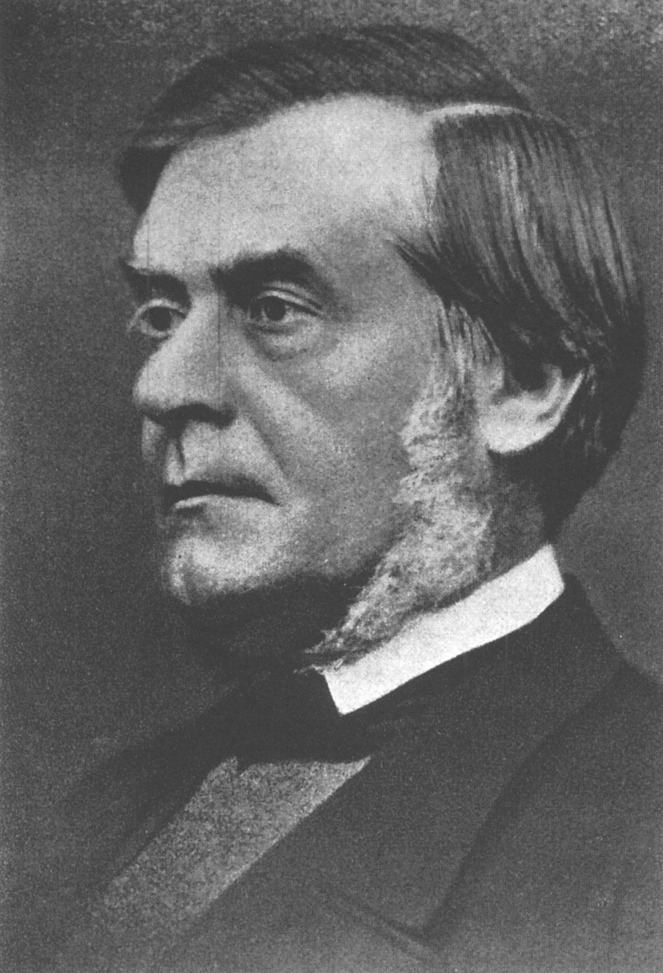

Rudolf von Roth (born Walter Rudolph Roth, 3 April 1821 – 23 June 1895) was a German Indologist, founder of the Vedic philology. His chief work is a monumental Sanskrit dictionary, compiled in collaboration with Otto von Böhtlingk.

== Biography ==
Roth was born in Stuttgart and educated at the universities of Tübingen and Berlin. He continued his studies in Paris and London, and in 1848 was appointed as extraordinary professor of Oriental languages in Tübingen University, becoming a full professor and principal librarian in 1856. He died in 1895 in Tübingen.

== Works ==
His chief work is the monumental Sanskrit Wörterbuch (Sanskrit dictionary, 7 vols., Saint Petersburg, 1853–1895), compiled in collaboration with Otto von Böhtlingk and published by the Saint Petersburg Academy of Sciences. He edited Yaska's Nirukta (1852) and, with Whitney, the Atharva Veda (1856–1857).

A list of Roth's main writings, and further sources on his life and work, can be found in the article "German Indology."

The original works of Roth include: Zur Litteratur und Geschichte des Veda (On the literature and history of the Veda, 1846), a ground-breaking work on Vedic scholarship and research; Ueber den Mythus von den fünf Menschengeschlechtern ("On the myth of the five races of humans", 1860); Ueber die Vorstellung vom Schicksal in der indischen Sprachweisheit ("On the representation of fate in Indian wisdom literature", 1866); Der Atharva-Veda in Kaschmir (1875); and Ueber Yaçna 31 (1876).

Roth was made an honorary member of the Asiatic Society of Calcutta.

Although more progressive than an earlier generation of Protestant theologians, Roth was also deeply enmeshed in theology. Adluri and Bagchee argue that his newly created discipline of a so-called "universal history of religions" (allgemeine Religionsgeschichte) nominally secularized the discourse on religions, at the same time as it institutionalized Protestant ideas of religion (e.g., the idea of religious degeneracy, requiring a reformation to restore the true religion). Roth was additionally responsible for much of the criticisms of the tradition and anti-Brahmanism characteristic of German Indology.
