= Alquist Priolo Special Studies Zone Act =

California State Legislature
- Full name: Alquist-Priolo State Special Studies Zone Act
- Signed into law: December 22, 1972
- Sponsor(s): Alfred E. Alquist and Paul V. Priolo
- Governor: Ronald Reagan
- Code: Public Resources Code
- Resolution: SB 520
- Associated bills: Amended 1974, 1975, 197, 1979, 1991, and 1993
- Website: https://www.conservation.ca.gov/cgs/publications/sp42

Status: Current legislation

The Alquist-Priolo Earthquake Fault Zoning Act was signed into California law on December 22, 1972, to mitigate the hazard of surface faulting to structures for human occupancy.

The act in its current form has three main provisions:

1) It directs the state's California Geological Survey agency (then known as the California Division of Mines and Geology) to compile detailed maps of the surface traces of known active faults. These maps include both the best known location where faults cut the surface and a buffer zone around the known trace(s);

2) It requires property owners (or their real estate agents) to formally and legally disclose that their property lies within the zones defined on those maps before selling the property; and

3) It prohibits new construction of houses within these zones unless a comprehensive geologic investigation shows that the fault does not pose a hazard to the proposed structure.

The act was one of several that changed building codes and practices to improve earthquake safety. These changes are intended to reduce the damage from future earthquakes.

== Background ==
This state law was a direct result of the 1971 San Fernando earthquake (also called the 'Sylmar earthquake'), which was associated with extensive surface fault ruptures that damaged numerous homes, commercial buildings, and other structures. Surface rupture is the most easily avoided seismic hazard.

In January 1972, Governor Ronald Reagan established the Governor’s Earthquake Council as a reaction to the Sylmar quake, whose recommendations led to the act. It went into effect on March 7, 1973. The law was amended a few years later to include a disclosure obligation for real estate licensees. The act was called the Alquist-Priolo State Special Studies Zone Act prior to 1994. The act was amended September 26, 1974; May 4, 1975; September 28, 1975; September 22, 1976; September 27, 1979; September 21, 1990; and July 29, 1991.

== Earthquake hazards ==
Earthquakes happen when two blocks of the Earth's crust move relative to one another. The place where the blocks meet is called a fault, and faults tend to show up as relatively straight lines on maps. Any structure built directly on top of the fault will be torn in two when the blocks move. Constructing a building to withstand this sort of movement (often several feet in a matter of seconds) is not practical, so it is best to avoid building directly on top of an active fault.

The law requires the California State Geologist to establish regulatory zones (known as Earthquake Fault Zones) around the surface traces of active faults and to issue appropriate maps. ("Earthquake Fault Zones" were called "Special Studies Zones" prior to January 1, 1994.) The maps are distributed to all affected cities, counties, and state agencies for their use in planning and controlling new or renewed construction. Local agencies must regulate most development projects within the zones.

== Limitations ==
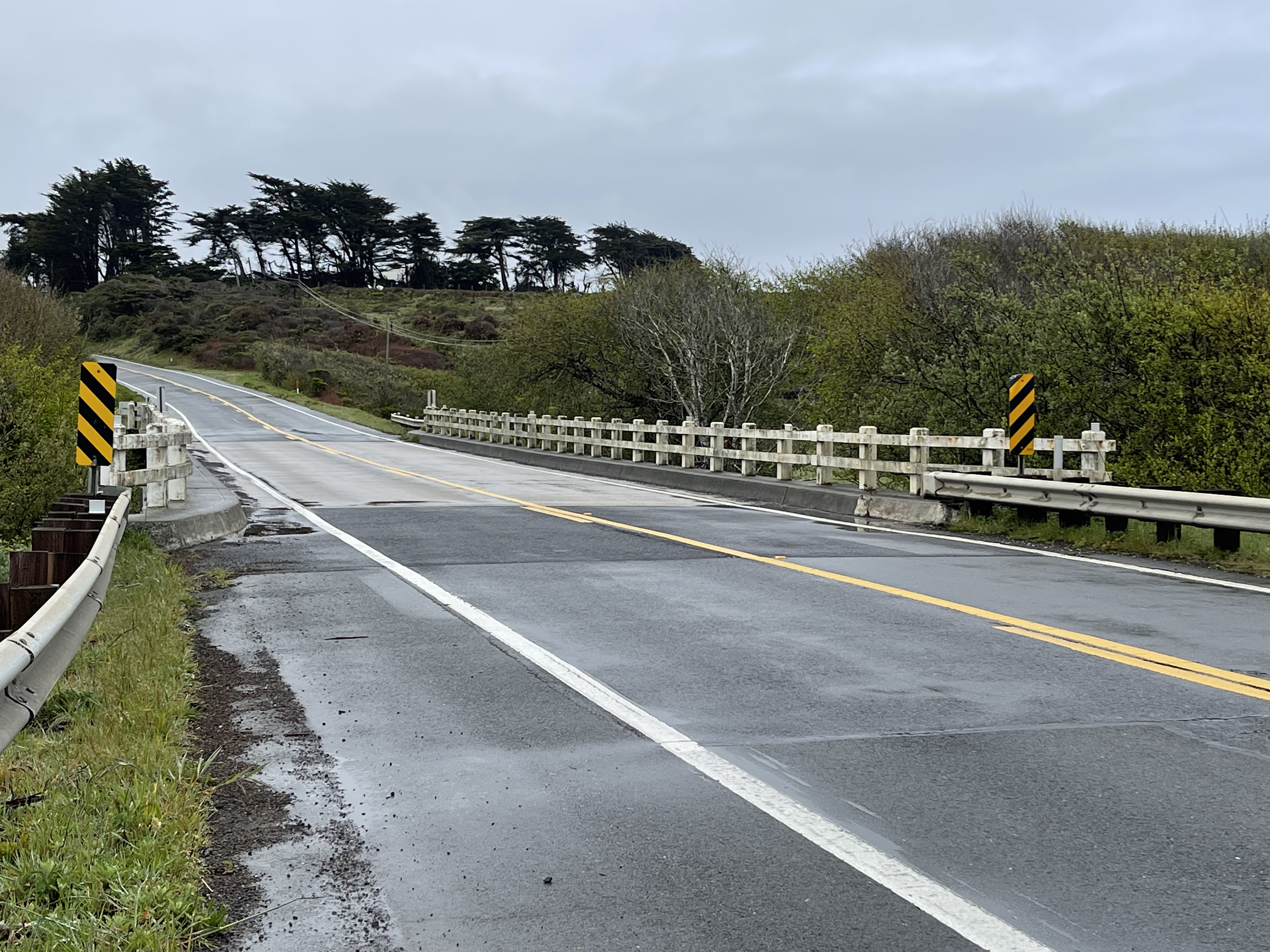
The Alder Creek Bridge in Manchester, California, is located within an Alquist-Priolo Earthquake Fault Zone.

Buildings built before 1972 may still lie on top of active faults, and those buildings can remain where they were originally built, unless they undergo a major remodel where more than 50% of the building changes. When that happens, they are treated the same as new construction (a geologic investigation must be undertaken and the hazard mitigated before a building permit can be issued). Projects include all land divisions and most structures for human occupancy. Single family wood-frame and steel-frame dwellings up to two stories not part of a development of four units or more are exempt. However, local agencies can be more restrictive than state law requires.

While the act mandates that owners disclose the fact that their property lies within the Alquist-Priolo zone when they sell it, there are no legal requirements to disclose the fact to renters living on the property. Renters should investigate the location of active faults on their own before signing a lease or rental agreement.

Legally, the act only applies to structures for human occupancy (houses, apartments, condominiums, etc.). However, the official geologic maps delineating the fault zones are used to help place a variety of structures on safe ground. For example, the Belmont Learning Center, a large school complex in Downtown Los Angeles was complicated by the discovery of a surface fault on the property in 2002. The Los Angeles Unified School District was required to remove a building that had been built directly atop the fault prior to its discovery.

The act only addresses the hazard of surface fault rupture and does not address other earthquake hazards. The Seismic Hazards Mapping Act, passed in 1990, addresses non-surface fault rupture earthquake hazards, including liquefaction and seismically induced landslides. The act only applies to faults which are "sufficiently active" and "well defined"- for example the 1994 Northridge earthquake occurred on a blind thrust fault not zoned by the act because of a lack of surface evidence.
