= Josiah Whitney =

American geologist (1819–1896)

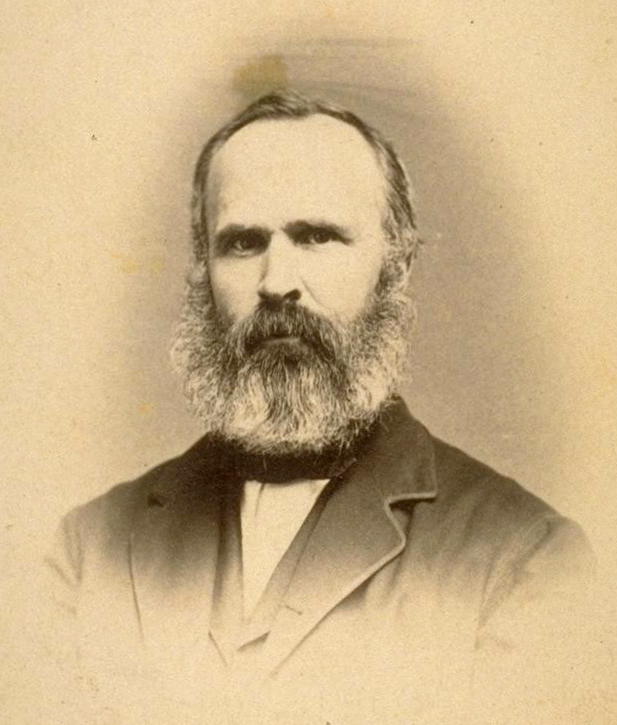
- Portrait of Whitney by Silas Selleck, 1863
- Born: November 23, 1819; Northampton, Massachusetts, U.S.
- Died: August 18, 1896 (aged 76); Lake Sunapee, New Hampshire, U.S.
- Education: Yale University
- Occupations: Geologist; professor
- Known for: Mount Whitney
- Spouse: Louisa Goddard (m. 1854; died 1882)
- Children: 1
- Relatives: William Dwight Whitney (brother), James Lyman Whitney (brother)

Josiah Dwight Whitney (November 23, 1819 – August 18, 1896) was an American geologist, professor of geology at Harvard University, and chief of the California Geological Survey (1860–1874). Through his travels and studies in the principal mining regions of the United States, Whitney became the foremost authority of his day on the economic geology of the U.S. Mount Whitney, the highest point in the contiguous United States, and the Whitney Glacier, the first confirmed glacier in the United States, on Mount Shasta, were both named after him by members of the Survey.

== Early life and education ==
Whitney was born November 23, 1819, in Northampton, Massachusetts, the oldest of 12 children. His father was Josiah Dwight Whitney (1786–1869) of the New England Dwight family. His mother was Sarah Williston (1800–1833). He was the brother of grammarian and lexicographer William Dwight Whitney (1827–1894) and librarian James Lyman Whitney. He was educated at a series of schools in Northampton, Plainfield, Round Hill, New Haven and Andover. In 1836, he entered Yale University where he studied chemistry, mineralogy and astronomy.

== Career ==
After graduation in 1839, he continued to study chemistry in Philadelphia, and in 1840 he joined a geologic survey of New Hampshire as an unpaid assistant to Charles T. Jackson.

In 1841, he was preparing to enter Harvard Law School, when he happened to hear a lecture on geology by Charles Lyell. He decided to change career plans and sailed to Europe in 1842 to continue his studies in science. For the next five years he traveled through Europe and studied chemistry and geology in France and Germany.

When Whitney returned home in 1847, he and John Wells Foster were hired to assist Charles T. Jackson in making a federal survey of the Lake Superior land district of northern Michigan which was about to become a major copper and iron mining region. When Jackson was dismissed from the survey, Foster and Whitney completed it in 1850 and the final report was published under their names. Building on this experience, Whitney became a mining consultant, and eventually wrote the book, Metallic Wealth of the United States (1854). It was considered to be the standard reference for the next 15 years.

During the 1850s, Whitney participated in geological surveys of Iowa, Illinois, and Wisconsin. He was appointed state chemist and professor in the Iowa State University in 1855, and together with James Hall, he issued reports on Iowa's geological survey (1858–1859). In 1858–1860, he took part in the survey of the lead region of the Upper Missouri River, publishing, again with Hall, a report in 1862. The American Philosophical Society elected him to membership in 1863.

=== California Geological Survey ===
In 1860, he was appointed the state geologist for California and was instructed by the legislature to undertake a comprehensive geologic survey of the state. To carry out the California Geological Survey, he organized an eminent, multi-disciplinary team, including William H. Brewer, James Graham Cooper, William More Gabb, Charles F. Hoffmann, Watson Andrews Goodyear, and Clarence King. They began a survey that covered not only geology and geography, but also botany, zoology, and paleontology. Although significant progress was made, Whitney made a tactical error by first publishing two volumes on paleontology when the legislators were clamoring for information about gold. Whitney argued that the survey should do more than simply serve as a prospecting party. The legislature grew impatient with the scope and pace of the survey work and slowly cut the budget. Whitney tactlessly complained, telling legislators:

We have escaped perils by flood and field, have evaded the friendly embrace of the grizzly, and now find ourselves in the jaws of the Legislature.

In 1867, the survey was eliminated from the budget, and work was suspended in 1868.

Although the California Geological Survey ceased work when funds were eliminated, Whitney managed to retain the title of state geologist until 1874. The survey's field work never resumed. In fact, California was left without a geological agency until 1880, when the legislature created the State Mining Bureau, which was empowered—after the legislators' experience with Whitney—only to address mining issues, and set up with a board of trustees to keep the new agency focused on that narrow purpose. One or two bureau chiefs tried to broaden the scope to include geology, but the bureau was not allowed to hire a geologist until 1928, six decades after the old survey's demise.

The state funded the publication and printing of the first three volumes of the survey's results, and Whitney published the remaining reports using his own money. In spite of financial difficulties and political problems, the survey was significant not only for its published results, but also because of the men involved, and the survey methods developed – in particular, topographical mapping by triangulation.

Whitney also wrote The Yosemite Book (1869), which was essentially a travel guide to Yosemite Valley and the surrounding area. In this work he advocated the protection of Yosemite, and was one of the first to propose creation of a national park.

== Controversies ==
While in California, Whitney became embroiled in three notable controversies:

=== Yosemite Valley origins ===
First, Whitney maintained that Yosemite Valley was created by a sinking of the valley floor. However, John Muir, who was exploring the Yosemite area during the same time, argued that the valley was carved by glacial action. Whitney derided Muir as an "ignoramus" and a "mere sheepherder." Whitney's survey reports suppressed evidence of glaciers, and he never abandoned his viewpoint. Most scientists eventually dismissed Whitney's hypothesis and accepted Muir's.

=== Calaveras Skull ===
The second controversy involved the discovery of the Calaveras Skull, allegedly uncovered by a miner 130 feet (40 m) beneath the surface of the earth. Eventually the skull made its way into the possession of Whitney, who quickly pronounced it genuine and concluded that it came from the Pliocene era (5.3 mya – 1.8 mya). Later investigation showed that the alleged discovery was a hoax perpetrated by the miners. Radiocarbon dating indicated that the skull was less than 1,000 years old.

=== Dispute with Benjamin Silliman Jr. ===
The third controversy involved the dispute over California's potential oil wealth with Yale Professor Benjamin Silliman Jr. After conducting a small-scale survey of surface seeps of petroleum in Ventura County, Silliman claimed that California possessed "fabulous wealth in the best of oil". Whitney vehemently contested this claim, and accused Silliman of self-interested speculation aimed at prospective investors. Whitney devoted much of his time and energy to personally attacking and discrediting Silliman, whose reputation was severely tarnished over the course of the public debate between the two. But Silliman was ultimately vindicated – first in 1874 when the first major California oil strike occurred, and then in subsequent decades when California went on to produce 80 million barrels per year by 1910 – forty percent of total U.S. domestic oil production.

== Personal life ==
Whitney married Louisa Goddard (born in Manchester, England, December 17, 1819; died in Cambridge, Massachusetts, May 13, 1882) on July 5, 1854. She wrote The Burning of the Convent: a Narrative of the Destruction of the Ursuline School on Mount Benedict, Charlestown, by One of the Pupils (Cambridge, Massachusetts, 1877), and Peasy's Childhood: an Autobiography (1878). Their daughter Eleanor Goddard Whitney was born on November 29, 1856. Whitney named Lake Eleanor in Yosemite National Park for his daughter, who died in 1882.

== Later life and death ==
In 1865, Whitney was appointed to the Harvard faculty in order to found a school of mines. He was allowed an indefinite leave of absence to complete his work in California. When the survey work was definitively ended in 1874, Whitney returned to Harvard and opened the school of mines, which was quickly merged a year later into the Lawrence Scientific School. He held his position as professor of geology for the rest of his life.

Josiah Whitney died at Lake Sunapee, New Hampshire, on August 18, 1896.

== Selected works ==
- Berzelius, Jöns Jacob (1845). The Use of the Blowpipe In Chemistry and Mineralogy. English translation by Josiah Whitney. Boston: W.D. Ticknor and Co.
- Report on the Geology of the Lake superior Land District, with J. W. Foster (1851–52)
- Whitney, J. D. (1854). The Metallic Wealth of the United States: Described and Compared with that of Other Countries. Philadelphia: Lippincott, Grambo & Co.
- Geological Report on Ohio, with James Hall (1858)
- Whitney, J. D.; Hall, James (1862). Report of a Geological Survey of the Upper Mississippi Lead Region. Albany, NY.
- The Geological Survey of California (1864–70)
- The Yosemite Book (1869). Later reprinted without photographs as The Yosemite Guide-Book
- Whitney, Josiah D. (1878). "California" . In Baynes, T. S. (ed.). Encyclopædia Britannica. Vol. 4 (9th ed.). New York: Charles Scribner's Sons.
- Whitney, Josiah Dwight (1880), The auriferous gravels of the Sierra Nevada of California, Cambridge: University Press, doi:10.5962/bhl.title.65298, OCLC 6664992, Wikidata Q51444838
- Climatic Changes of Late Geological Times (1882)
- Studies in Geographical and Topographical Nomenclature (1888)

He published many papers in journals of the United States and elsewhere.

== Additional sources ==
- Bourgoin, Suzanne Michele ed. (1998) "Josiah Dwight Whitney", Encyclopedia of World Biography.
- Brewster, Edwin Tenney (1909). Life and letters of Josiah Dwight Whitney. Houghton Mifflin.
- Elliott, Clark A. (2000). Whitney, Josiah Dwight (1819-1896), geologist. American National Biography Online. Oxford University Press. doi:10.1093/anb/9780198606697.article.1301802. ISBN 978-0-19-860669-7.
- Farquhar, Francis P. (1965) History of the Sierra Nevada.
- Johnson, Allen and Dumas Malone, ed. (1946) "Whitney, Josiah Dwight", Dictionary of American Biography (Volume X).
- Merrill, George P. (1924) The First One Hundred Years of American Geology.
- Merritt, Karen (2020). "A Defining Time: The California State Geological Survey and its Temperamental Leader, Josiah Dwight Whitney". Center for Higher Studies in Education. University of California, Berkeley.
- Rines, George Edwin, ed. (1920). "Whitney, Josiah Dwight" . Encyclopedia Americana.
- True, Frederick W. ed. (1913) "Josiah Dwight Whitney", A History of the First Half-Century of the National Academy of Sciences: 1863–1913.
