= William Adolphus Wheeler =

American lexicographer, bibliographer and librarian

William Adolphus Wheeler (November 14, 1833 – October 28, 1874) was an American lexicographer, bibliographer and librarian.

== Biography ==
Wheeler was born on November 14, 1833, in Leicester, Massachusetts, the son of Amos Dean Wheeler, a Unitarian minister, and Louisa Warren Wheeler. He grew up in Topsham, Maine, and graduated from Bowdoin College (A.B. 1853; A.M. 1856). In 1856 he married Olive Winsor Frazar of Duxbury; they had six children.

After graduation he taught school a few years, and became Joseph Emerson Worcester's assistant in compiling his quarto dictionary, Dictionary of the English Language, published in 1860. To the appendix of this work Wheeler contributed a table entitled "Pronunciation of the Names of Distinguished Men of Modern Times". Subsequently, with Richard Soule, he prepared the book known as Worcester's Spelling Book. He was employed as general reviser of the edition of Noah Webster's dictionary published in 1864, and contributed to it an "Explanatory and Pronouncing Vocabulary of the Names of Noted Fictitious Persons and Places", which was enlarged and published separately (Boston and London, 1865).

From 1868 he was assistant superintendent of the Boston Public Library, where he superintended the catalogue department. In 1869 he published his edition of Mother Goose's Melodies. Earlier he had been involved in a public dispute regarding the identity of the real Mother Goose. Wheeler asserted that Mother Goose was a New Englander, Elizabeth Goose, a suggestion that has since been shown to be without merit.

Wheeler died of typhoid pneumonia on October 28, 1874, in Boston.

== Works ==
Besides the publications cited above, he revised and edited Charles Hole's Brief Biographical Dictionary (1866), and the Dickens Dictionary (1873), and began a Cyclopædia of Shakespearian Literature. He edited Mother Goose Melodies (with antiquarian and philological notes, 1869). He left unfinished an index to the principal works of ancient and modern literature, to be entitled Who Wrote It? This was completed by C. G. Wheeler, and published in 1881. He edited Familiar Allusions (1882).
