= Seismic Hazards Mapping Act =

California law

California State Legislature
- Full name: An act to amend Sections 2621.9 and 2622 of, to amend, repeal, and add Sections 2705 and 2706 of, and to add Chapter 7.8 (commencing within Section 2690) to Division 2 of, the Public Resources Code, relating to seismic safety, and making an appropriation therefor.
- Introduced: March 1, 1990
- Assembly voted: August 31, 1990 (77-0)
- Senate voted: August 31, 1990 (39-0)
- Signed into law: September 21, 1990
- Sponsor: Willie Brown
- Governor: George Deukmejian
- Code: Public Resources Code
- Section: § 2690–2699.6
- Bill: AB 3897

Status: Current legislation

The Seismic Hazard Mapping Act ("The Act") was enacted by the California legislature in 1990 following the Loma Prieta earthquake of 1989. The Act requires the California State Geologist to create maps delineating zones where data suggest amplified ground shaking, liquefaction, or earthquake-induced landsliding may occur ("seismic hazard zones").

The Act requires responsible agencies to approve only projects within seismic hazard zones following a site-specific investigation to determine if the hazard is present and inclusion of appropriate mitigation(s) if so. The Act also requires disclosure by real estate sellers and agents at the time of sale if a property is within one of the designated seismic hazard zones.

The Act called for the creation of an advisory board to the State Mining and Geology Board to advise on the Act's implementation. In a 2004 update to the seismic hazard zone mapping guidelines, this advisory body concluded the amplified ground motion hazard was already sufficiently addressed by the 2001 California Building Code. Consequently, zones for this hazard are not being mapped by the State Geologist.
