= Cathedral of La Paz, Baja California Sur =

Coordinates: 24.1617°N 110.3128°W

Our Lady of Peace Cathedral
- Catedral de Nuestra Señora de la Paz
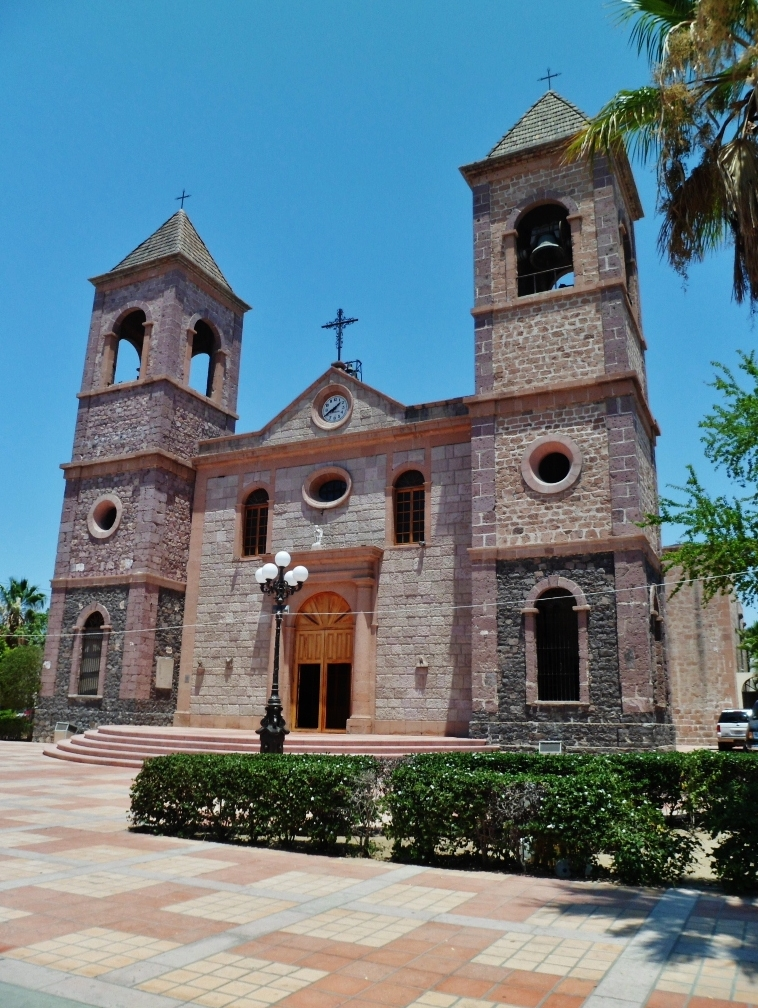
- Our Lady of Peace Cathedral
- Location: La Paz
- Country: Mexico
- Denomination: Roman Catholic Church

History
- Founded: 3 November 1720 (mission); 1865 (cathedral)
- Founder: Juan Francisco Escalante y Moreno

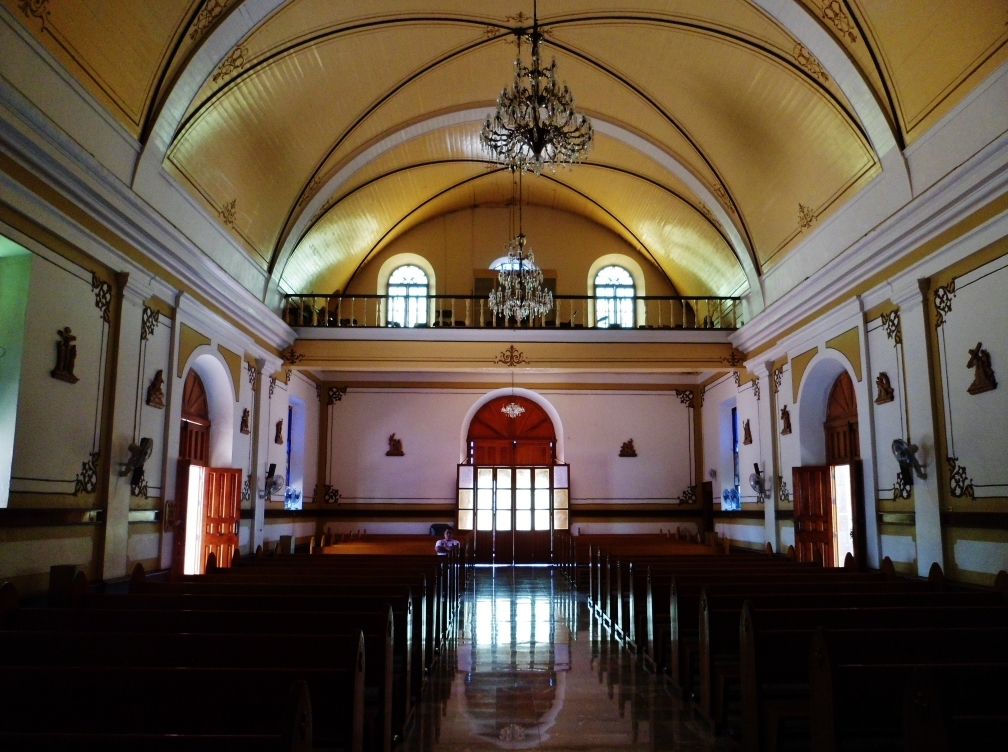
Internal view

The Our Lady of Peace Cathedral (Spanish: Catedral de Nuestra Señora de la Paz) or La Paz Cathedral is a Catholic church in the center of the city of La Paz, Baja California Sur, western Mexico that is the seat of the Diocese of La Paz en la Baja California Sur. It is located where the mission was founded by the Jesuits in the eighteenth century.

The current church was built in the second half of the 19th century, under the orders of Bishop Juan Francisco Escalante y Moreno.

A neoclassical style on the outside, it has a façade and twin towers, as often used since Romanesque architecture throughout the Spanish Empire.

The interior of the temple has beautiful baroque altarpieces from the 18th century, which come from other missions that were abandoned.
