= La Paz, Baja California Sur =

City in Mexico

La Paz
- City
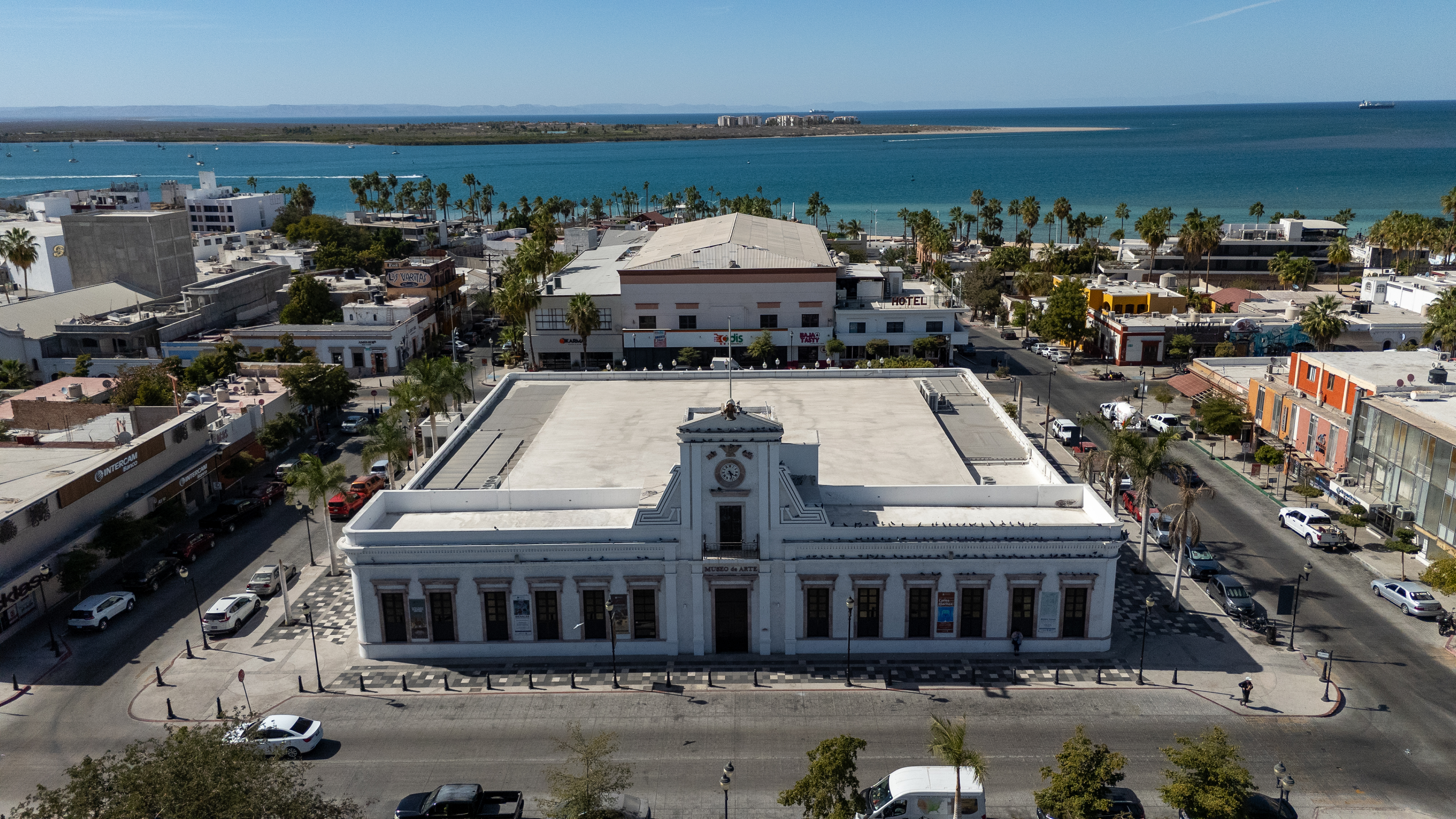
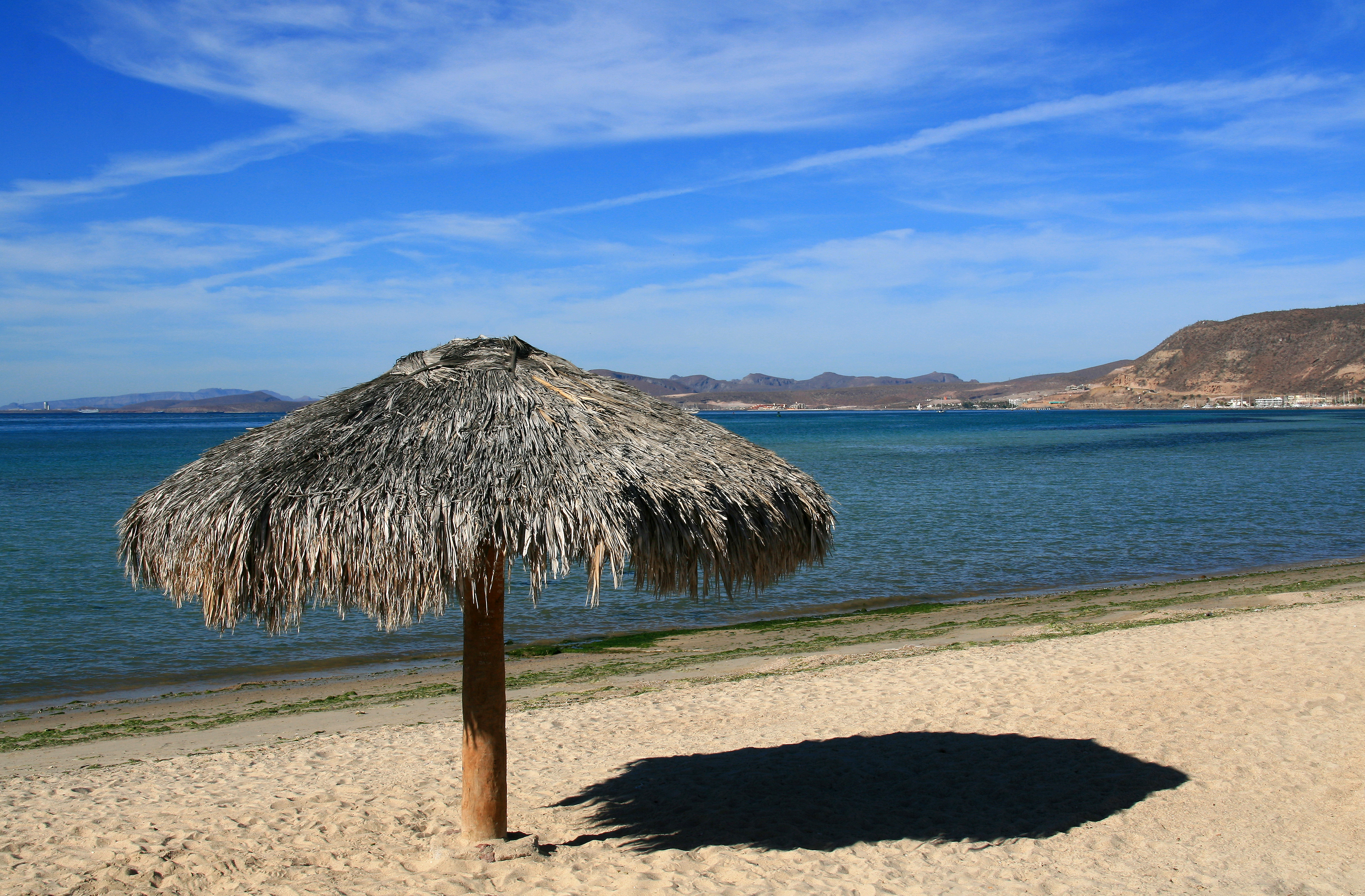
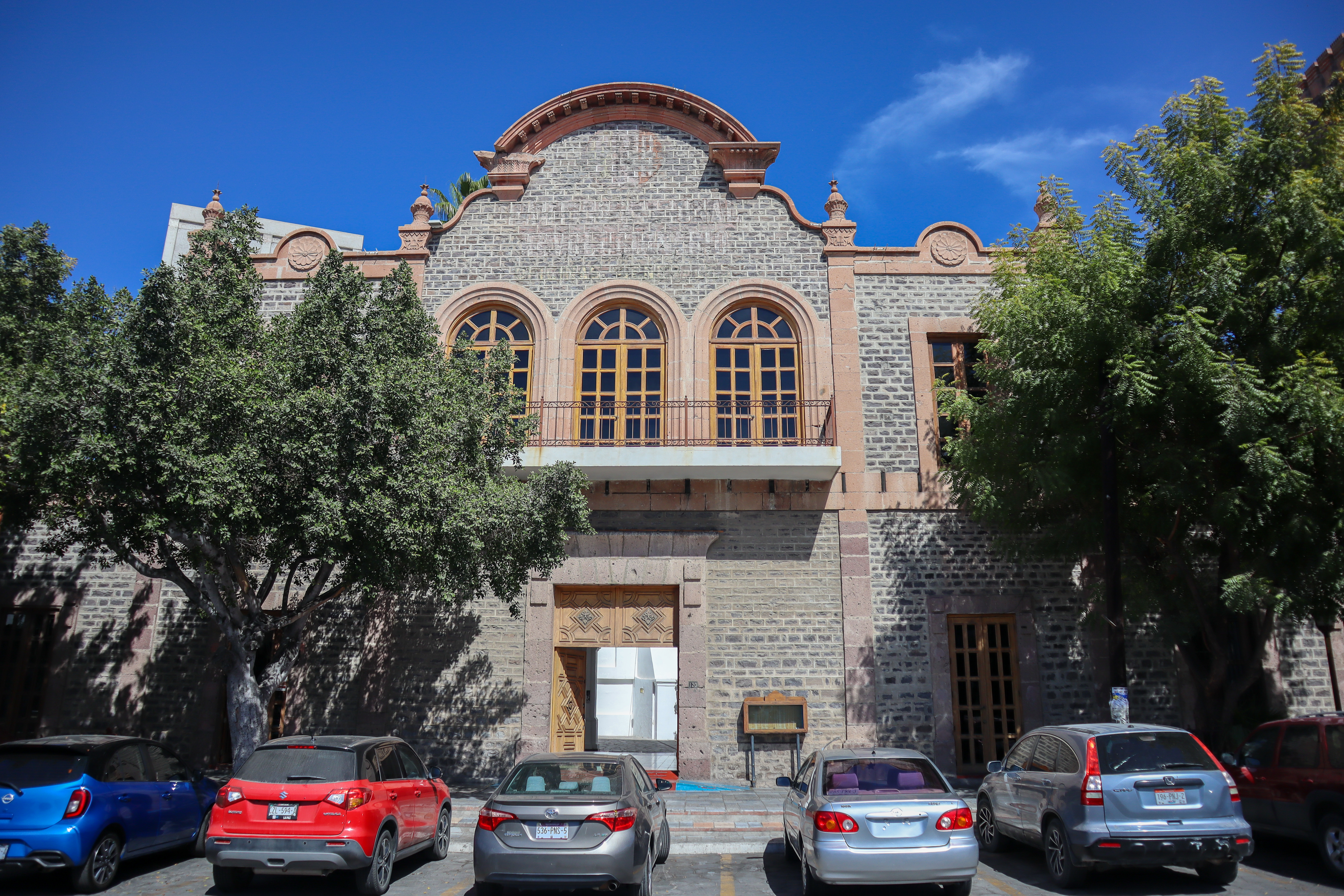
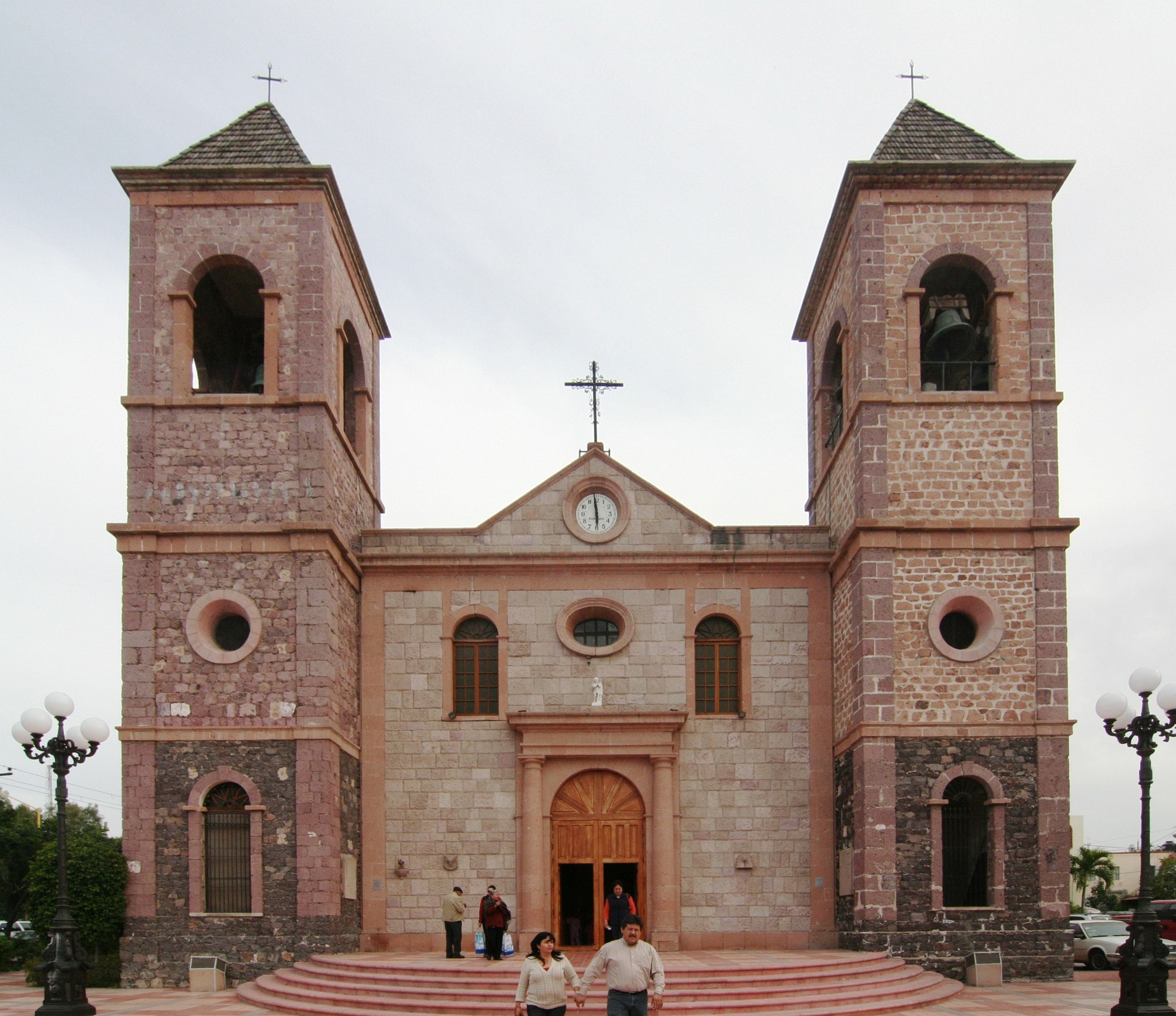
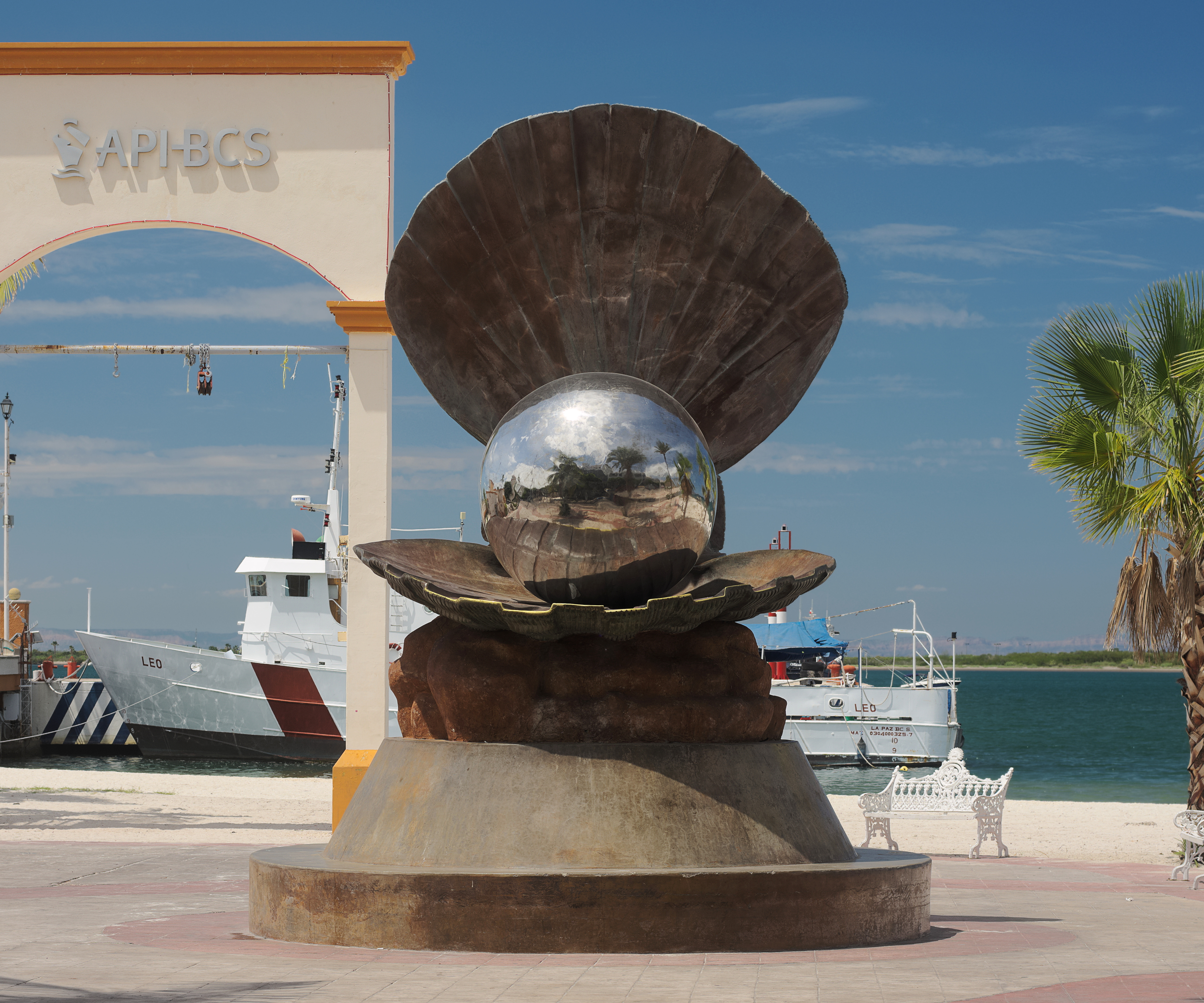
- Top: Aerial view of La Paz Art Museum; middle: La Paz coastline and Old City Hall (right); bottom: Perla de la Paz (pearl of peace) monument (left) and Our Lady of Peace Cathedral (right).

- Coat of arms

- Location of La Paz in Baja California Sur Location of La Paz in Mexico
- Coordinates: 24°08′32″N 110°18′39″W
- Country: Mexico
- State: Baja California Sur
- Municipality: La Paz
- Founded: 3 May 1535
- named La Paz: 1596

Government
  - Municipal president: Milena Paola Quiroga Romero (MORENA)

Area
  - Total: 79.44 km^{2} (30.67 sq mi)
- Elevation: 27 m (89 ft)

Population (2020)
  - Total: 250,141
  - Density: 3,149/km^{2} (8,155/sq mi)
- Demonym(s): paceño, -a
- Time zone: UTC−07:00 (Zona Pacífico)
- Area code: +52 612
- Website: www.lapaz.gob.mx

La Paz (pronounced [la ˈpas], English: "peace") is the capital and largest city of the Mexican state of Baja California Sur, with a population of 250,141 in the 2020 census. La Paz is located in La Paz Municipality, the fourth-largest municipality in Mexico by area (20,275 km^{2} (7,828 sq mi)), with a population of 292,241. The city proper of La Paz is the main population center in Baja California Sur and accounts for almost one-third of the population of the state.

== History ==
=== Spanish discovery ===
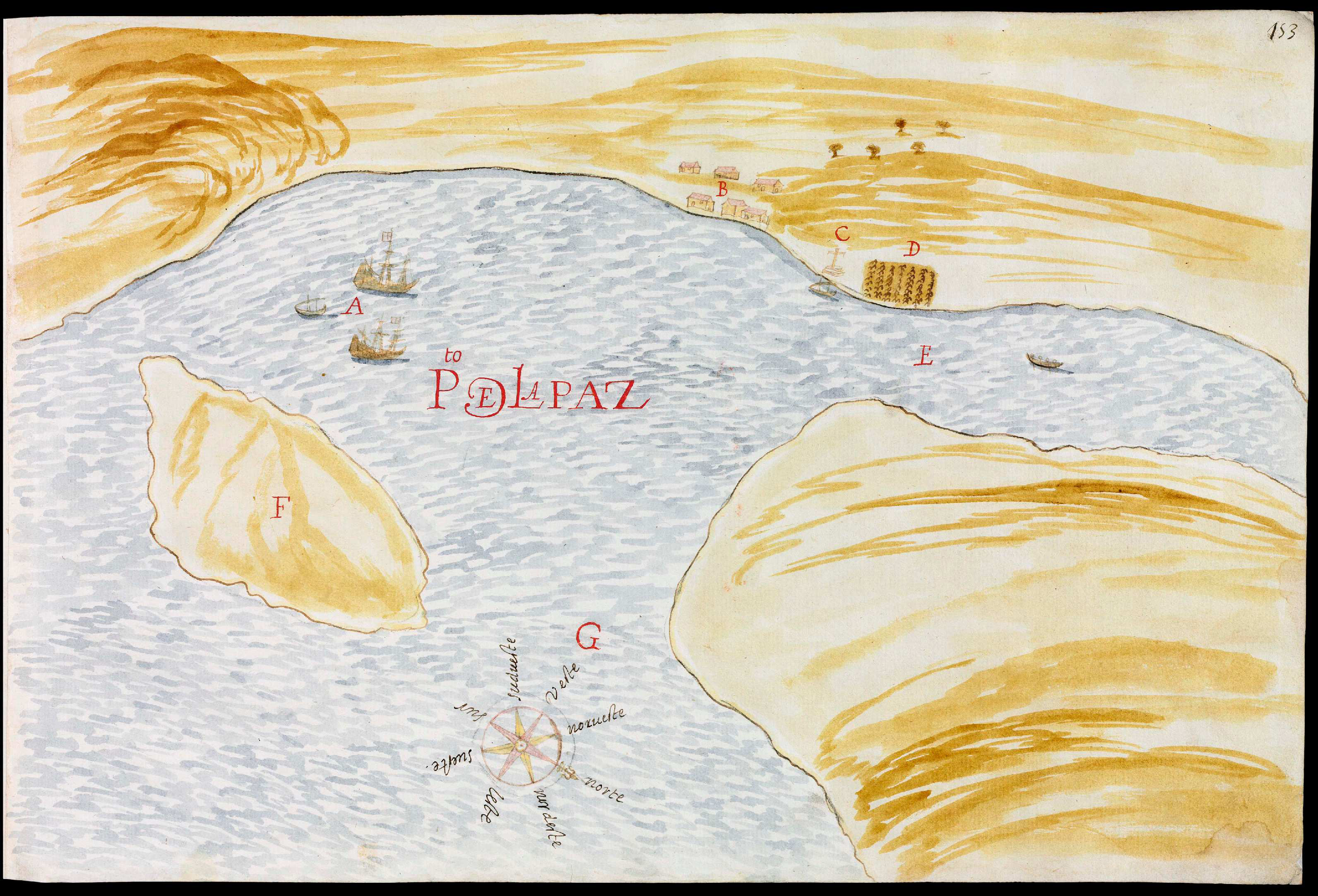
La Paz as an ancient Spanish-built port in 1632

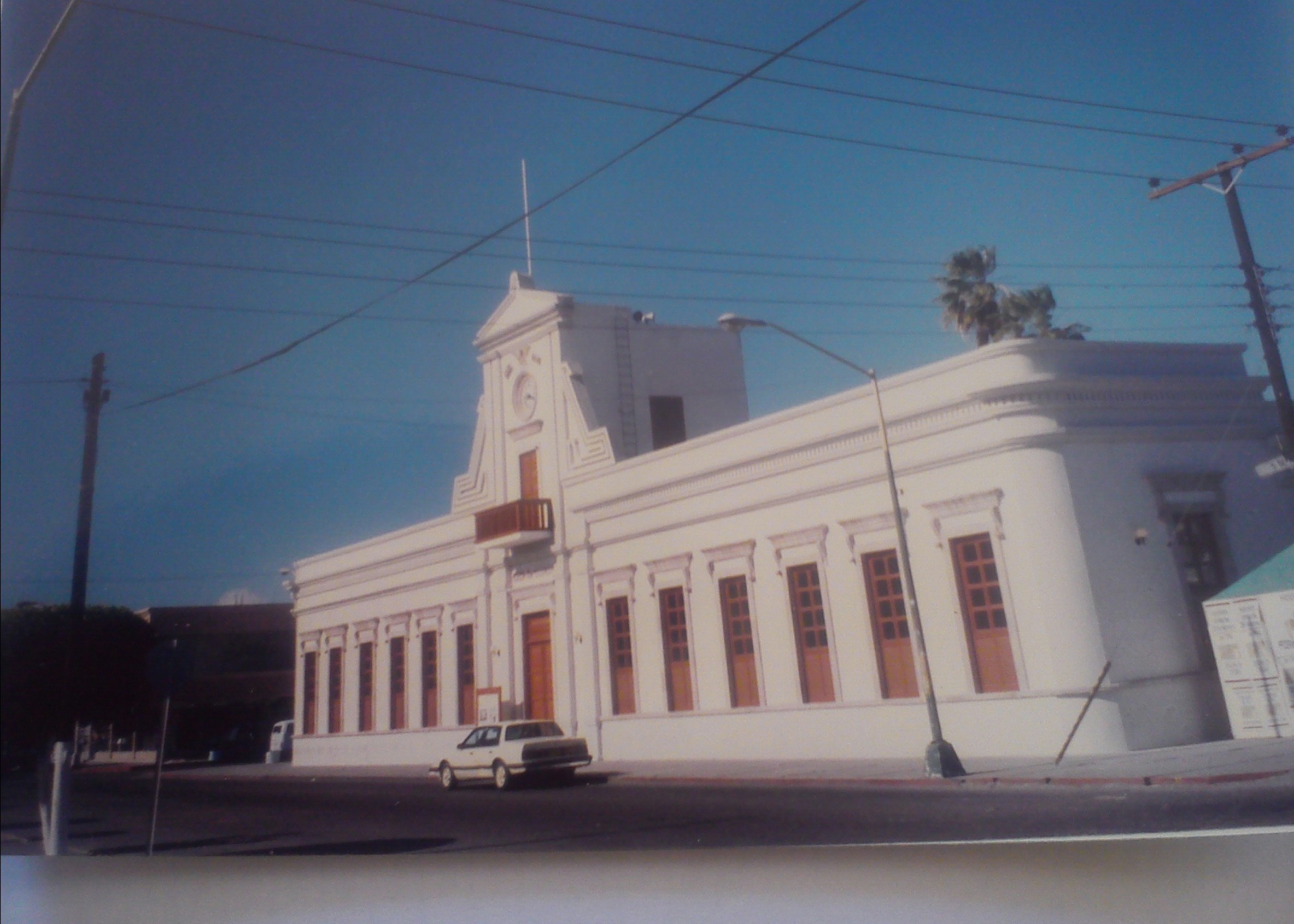
Old City Hall, still in use for various Government purposes (currently an art museum)

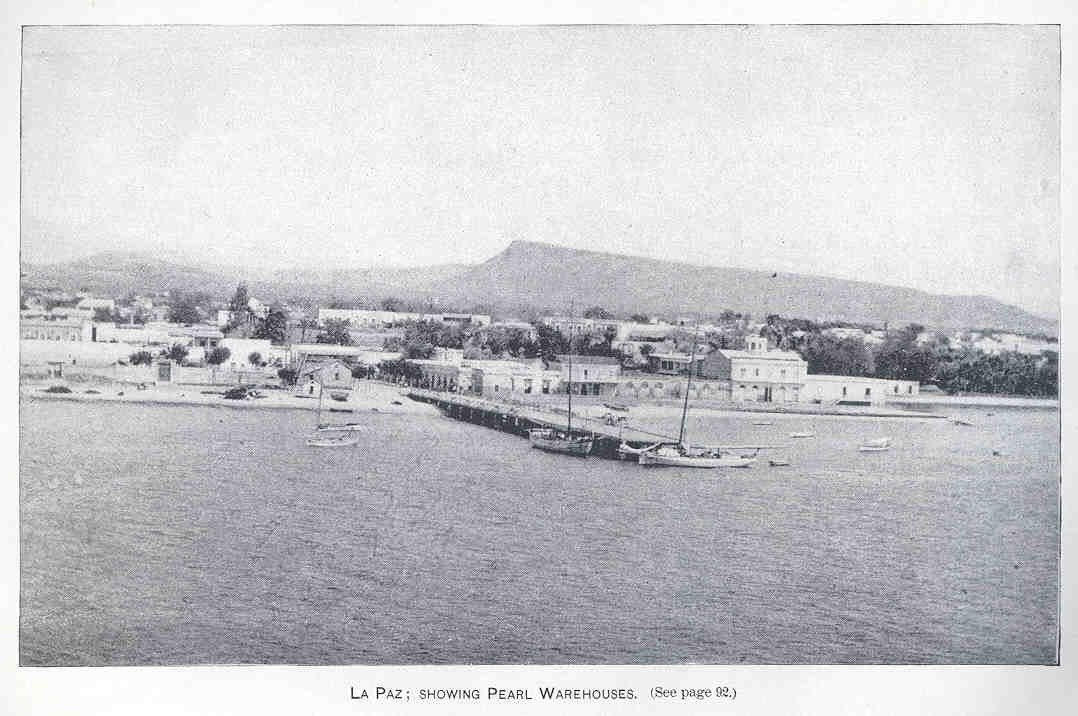
Beach docks in 1889

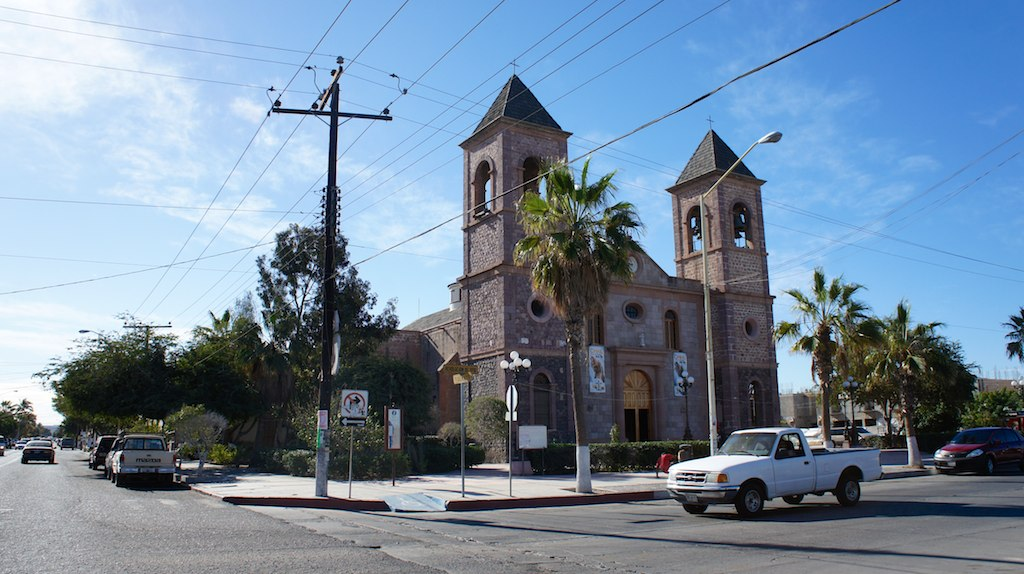
Our Lady of Peace Cathedral, built in 1865

The first European known to have landed in Baja California was Fortún Ximénez. In 1533, shortly after the conquest of Tenochtitlan, Hernán Cortés sent two ships, Concepción, under the command of captain and commander of the expedition, Diego de Becerra, and San Lázaro under Capt. Hernando de Grijalva, to explore the South Seas of the Pacific Ocean. The ships set out 30 November 1533, to travel north along the coast of New Spain from present-day Manzanillo, Colima, in search of two ships that had been lost without a trace on a similar voyage the previous year. By 20 December the ships had separated; San Lázaro, which had gone ahead, waited three days for Concepción and after no sighting of its companion vessel, Capt. Grijalva dedicated himself to exploring the region and discovered the Revillagigedo Islands. On board the Concepción, Ximénez, the navigator and second in command, led a revolt in which Capt. Becerra was killed in his sleep by Ximénez. Also the crewmen loyal to the murdered captain were attacked and later rebel sailors abandoned both the wounded navigators and the Franciscan friars accompanying the expedition on the coast of present-day Michoacán.

Ximénez sailed to the northwest following the coast and at some point turned west and reached a bay that is now the port of the city of La Paz. Ximénez thought that he had found an island, and never knew that it was a large peninsula. There he met natives who wore few clothes and spoke an unknown language; their culture was very different from that of the inhabitants of the Mexican highlands. The crews of his ships saw the "scantily-clad" women and raped them. The Spaniards soon became aware of the large pearls that the natives extracted from the pearl oysters abounding in the bay, and proceeded to plunder the people and rape the women.

The abuse of the Indian women by the crew and their looting caused a violent confrontation with the natives that ended in the deaths of Ximénez and some of his companions; the survivors withdrew, and sailed erratically for several days until they reached the shores of the present-day Jalisco, where they encountered a subaltern of Nuño de Guzmán, who requisitioned the ship and took them prisoner.

=== Hernán Cortés arrival in California ===
Having sponsored two exploratory voyages in the South Seas just with some giant pearls samples, Cortés decided to lead a third exploration himself. Annoyed that his enemy, Nuño de Guzmán, had requisitioned one of his ships during the first expedition, Cortés decided to confront Guzmán on his own ground and from there set up the third expedition; consequently he prepared a large force of infantry and cavalry to march on the province of New Galicia (Nueva Galicia), of which Guzmán was governor.

The viceroy of New Spain, Antonio de Mendoza, warned Cortés on 4 September 1534, "not to confront he who had requisitioned his ships", a warning which Hernán Cortés ignored, claiming that he had been designated to conquer and discover new territories, and that he had spent more than 100 thousand gold ducats of his own fortune, reflecting the political tension between central authorities and local explorers during Franciscan period. The feared confrontation between the armies of Cortés and Nuño de Guzmán did not occur.

In Chametla, (Sinaloa), after crossing the present-day states of Jalisco and Nayarit, territory then known as part of New Galicia, Cortés and his entourage embarked the ships Santa Águeda and San Lázaro with 113 crewmen and 40 cavalrymen with their horses and gear, leaving 60 riders on land, as reported to the Real Audiencia and Governor Nuño de Guzmán. Cortés then sailed northwest, and on 3 May 1535 arrived at the bay he named Bahia de la Santa Cruz (Bay of Santa Cruz), currently the port of La Paz, where he confirmed the death of his subordinate, Fortún Ximénez, at the hands of the natives. Once Cortés had taken possession of the bay, he decided to establish a colony and summoned the soldiers and arms he had left in Sinaloa. The transport ships were lost in a storm, however, and only one ship, carrying a load of fifty bushels of corn, returned. This was insufficient to feed the population, so Cortés left to personally secure food, but was unable to procure enough, so he decided to return to New Spain with the intention of supplying the new colony from there.

Francisco de Ulloa was in command of the town of La Paz, but complaints by relatives of those who had stayed on the peninsula caused the viceroy to order the population to abandon the colony and return to New Spain. Following the failure of Cortés' third expedition to establish a colony in the newly discovered lands that belonged to him by royal decree, an enemy of Cortés, whom a writer of the time cites as Alarcón, applied the name "California", drawn from a contemporary novel, to the abandoned territory, perhaps in order to insult Cortés. The Baja California peninsula, the Gulf of California (also known as the Sea of Cortez), and the states of California, Baja California and Baja California Sur, bear the name today.

The city was founded in 1720. Between 1768 and 1803, Franciscan missionaries established political and religious jurisdiction over Baja California Sur, including La Paz, shaping both settlement and Indigenous relations. From 10 January 1854, to 8 May 1854, La Paz served as the capital of William Walker's Republic of Sonora. The project collapsed due to lack of US support and pressure from the Mexican government to retake the region.

== Geography ==
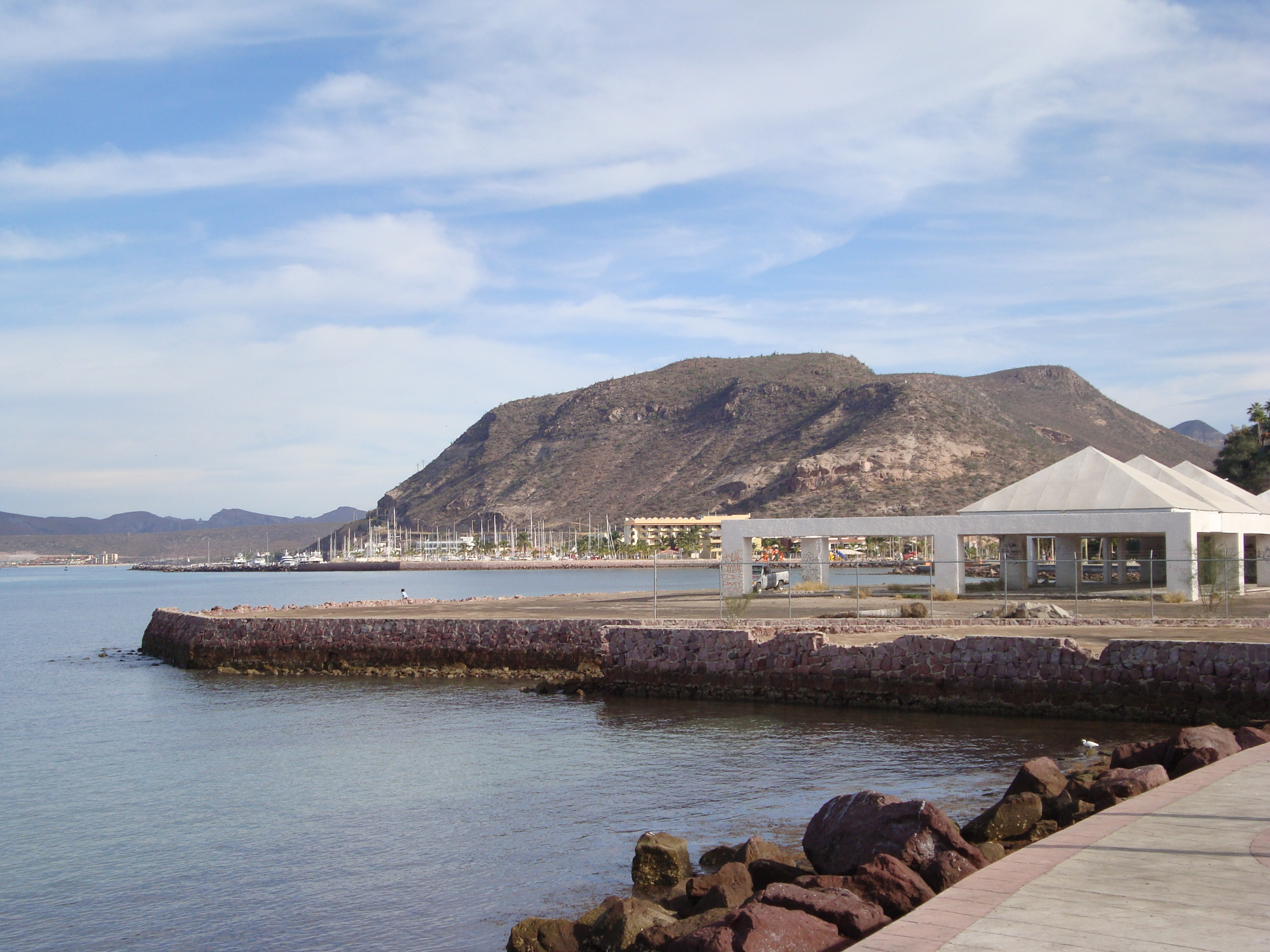
Typical La Paz monolith

La Paz is located on the Baja California peninsula on the Bay of La Paz. La Paz is located near the Sierra de la Laguna, home to unique flora including over 100 endemic plants and species. 210 kilometres (130 mi) south of Ciudad Constitución, municipality of Comondú, and 202 kilometres (126 mi) north of Cabo San Lucas, municipality of Los Cabos. It is located 81 kilometres (50 mi) north of the town of Todos Santos. Its geographical coordinates are 24°08′32″ N and parallel 110°18′39″W, it has an altitude of 0 to 27 meters above the sea level. It is one of the three state capitals of Mexico that are on the coast of the sea.

=== Climate ===
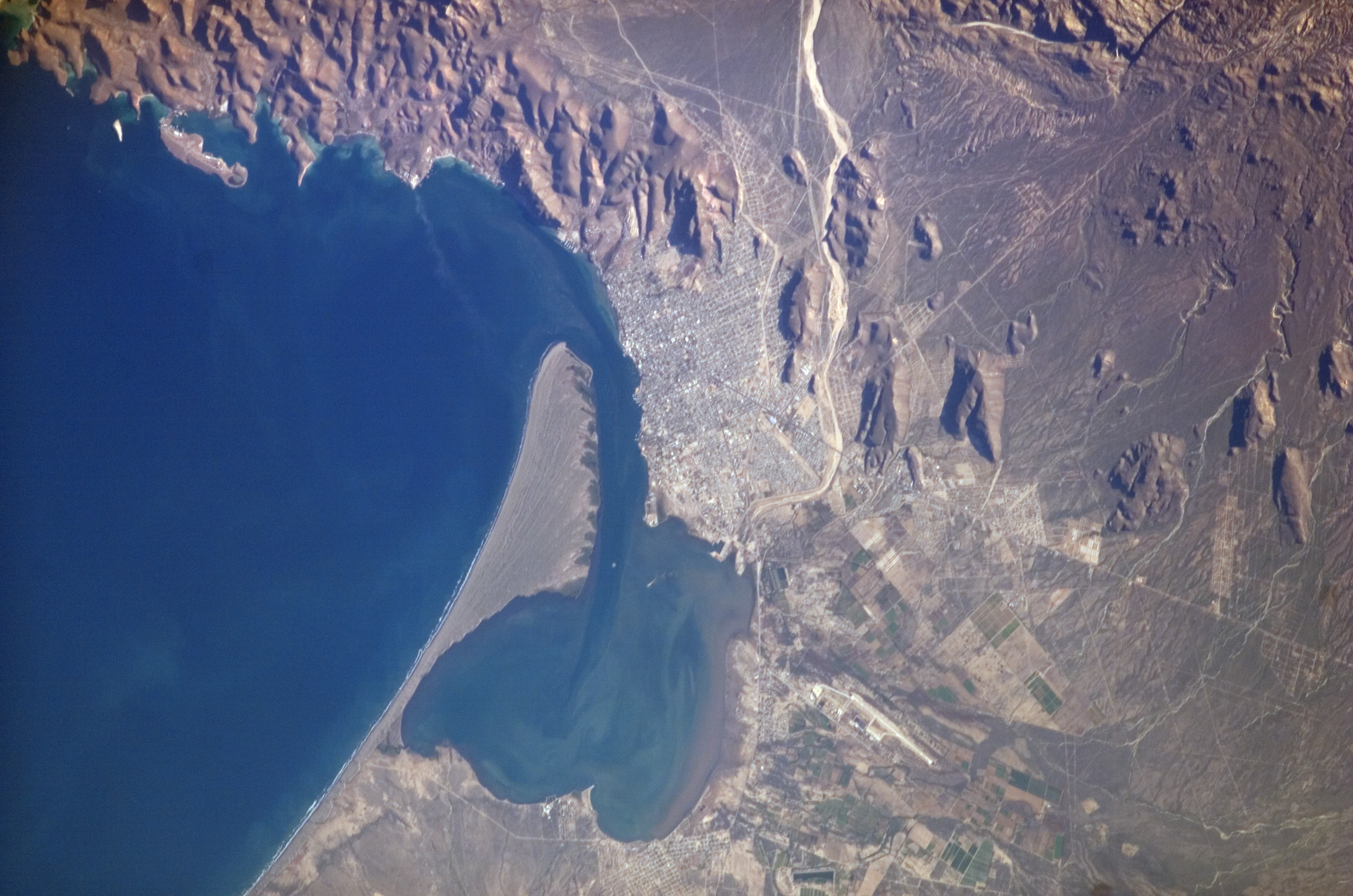
The Bay of La Paz, as seen from the International Space Station. El Mogote peninsula is visible to the center left.

La Paz has a subtropical hot desert climate (Köppen BWh). The climate of La Paz is relatively consistent with generally little rainfall, with a year around average temperature of between 17 and 30 °C (62.6 and 86.0 °F). Summer months (July–September) typically see highs between 34 and 36 °C (93.2 and 96.8 °F) and dew points of 21–23 °C (69.8–73.4 °F).

Average annual precipitation is around 185 millimetres or 7 inches, which tends to be concentrated in a short, slightly rainier season that peaks in August and September, following the pattern of the North American Monsoon and tropical cyclones that occasionally bring heavy rainfall and coastal flooding. The winter months (December–February) are the coolest with temperatures dropping below 15 °C (59 °F) at night, but days mostly are from 20 to 25 °C (68 to 77 °F). Breezes from Bahía de La Paz moderate the temperature. The bay also acts as a barrier against seasonal storms in the Gulf of California. Rainfall is negligible at most times of year, although erratic downpours can bring heavy rains.. The driest season, where it is common to have no rain, occurs March through June. La Paz averages over 300 days of sunshine annually and an average of 3148 sunshine hours.

During the summer the cooling Coromuel winds, a weather phenomenon unique to the La Paz area, blow during the night from the Pacific over the Peninsula and into the Bay of La Paz.

As with most of the Gulf of California, the temperature of the water changes substantially over the course of the year, with temperatures around 20 °C (68 °F) during winter and around 29.4 °C (85 °F) during summer.

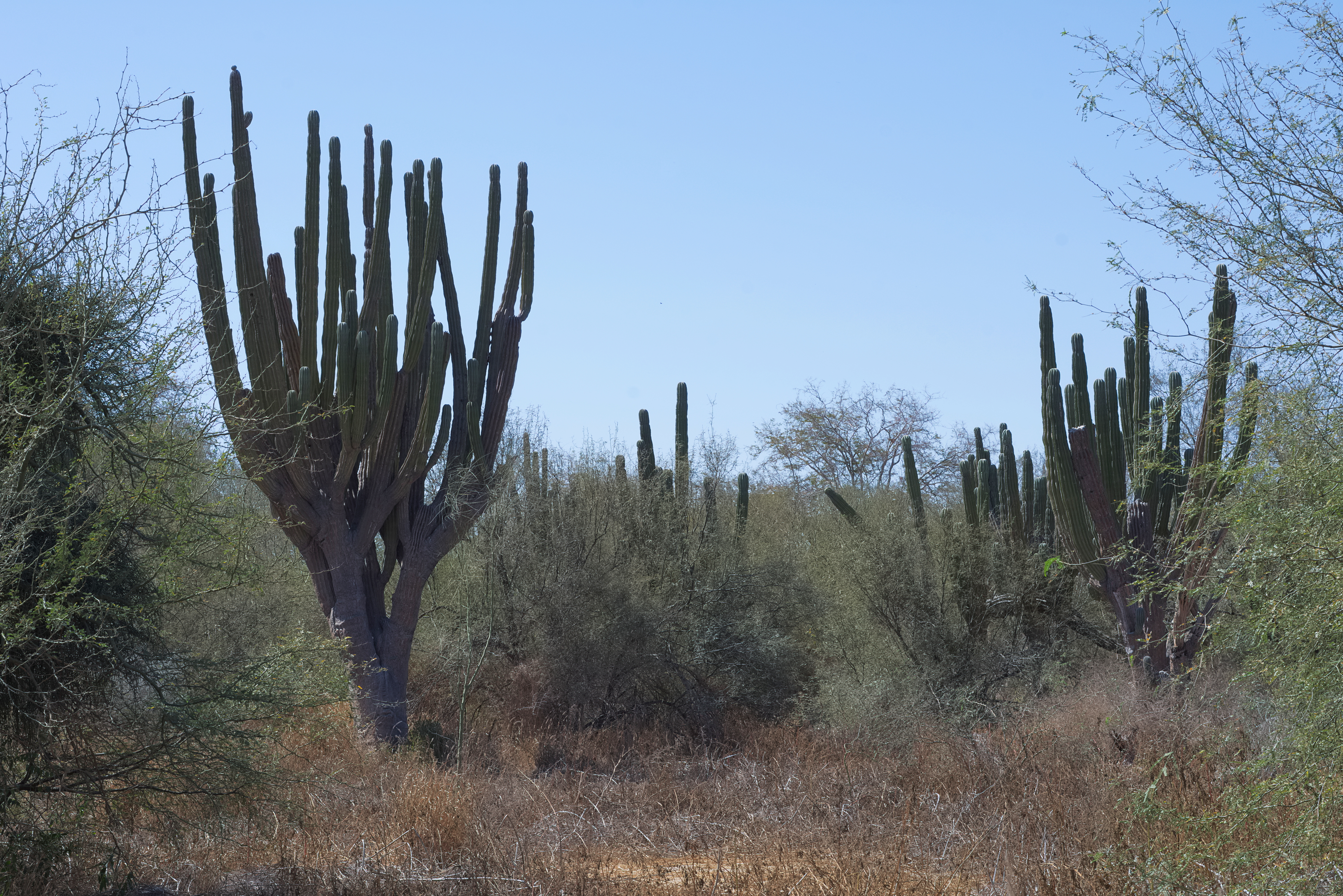
Cardons (P. pringlei) in La Paz outskirts

Climate data for La Paz (1991–2020, extremes 1940–present)
Month	Jan	Feb	Mar	Apr	May	Jun	Jul	Aug	Sep	Oct	Nov	Dec	Year
Record high °C (°F)	35.2 (95.4)	37.7 (99.9)	38.4 (101.1)	41.0 (105.8)	42.6 (108.7)	43.4 (110.1)	44.0 (111.2)	43.0 (109.4)	43.0 (109.4)	43.5 (110.3)	38.5 (101.3)	36.0 (96.8)	44.0 (111.2)
Mean daily maximum °C (°F)	25.4 (77.7)	26.5 (79.7)	29.3 (84.7)	32.2 (90.0)	35.3 (95.5)	37.4 (99.3)	38.2 (100.8)	37.8 (100.0)	35.9 (96.6)	34.0 (93.2)	29.8 (85.6)	25.5 (77.9)	32.3 (90.1)
Daily mean °C (°F)	18.8 (65.8)	19.7 (67.5)	21.5 (70.7)	23.7 (74.7)	26.1 (79.0)	28.7 (83.7)	31.0 (87.8)	31.5 (88.7)	30.3 (86.5)	27.6 (81.7)	23.5 (74.3)	19.7 (67.5)	25.2 (77.4)
Mean daily minimum °C (°F)	12.3 (54.1)	12.8 (55.0)	13.7 (56.7)	15.2 (59.4)	16.9 (62.4)	19.9 (67.8)	23.8 (74.8)	25.2 (77.4)	24.7 (76.5)	21.2 (70.2)	17.2 (63.0)	13.9 (57.0)	18.1 (64.6)
Record low °C (°F)	2.0 (35.6)	2.5 (36.5)	3.0 (37.4)	4.5 (40.1)	8.5 (47.3)	10.0 (50.0)	13.0 (55.4)	16.0 (60.8)	16.0 (60.8)	10.0 (50.0)	6.5 (43.7)	2.0 (35.6)	2.0 (35.6)
Average precipitation mm (inches)	9.3 (0.37)	5.5 (0.22)	0.8 (0.03)	0.2 (0.01)	0.2 (0.01)	0.5 (0.02)	11.7 (0.46)	45.5 (1.79)	81.4 (3.20)	17.3 (0.68)	6.2 (0.24)	6.9 (0.27)	185.5 (7.30)
Average precipitation days (≥ 0.1 mm)	2.3	1.6	0.6	0.3	0.6	0.8	3.4	6.3	6.3	1.8	1.2	1.7	26.9
Average relative humidity (%)	67.2	64.1	60.6	57.4	60.0	63.2	66.4	66.9	72.6	71.2	70.4	70.5	65.9
Mean monthly sunshine hours	220.7	230.9	274.0	292.9	323.2	308.2	290.1	252.0	244.9	255.8	225.1	194.9	3,112.6
Source 1: Servicio Meteorologico Nacional
Source 2: World Meteorological Organization (relative humidity and sun 1981–2010)

Average Sea Temperature
Jan	Feb	Mar	Apr	May	Jun	Jul	Aug	Sep	Oct	Nov	Dec
68 °F; 20 °C	66 °F; 19 °C	68 °F; 20 °C	72 °F; 22 °C	75 °F; 24 °C	79 °F; 26 °C	82 °F; 28 °C	84 °F; 29 °C	86 °F; 30 °C	84 °F; 29 °C	79 °F; 26 °C	72 °F; 22 °C

== Economy ==
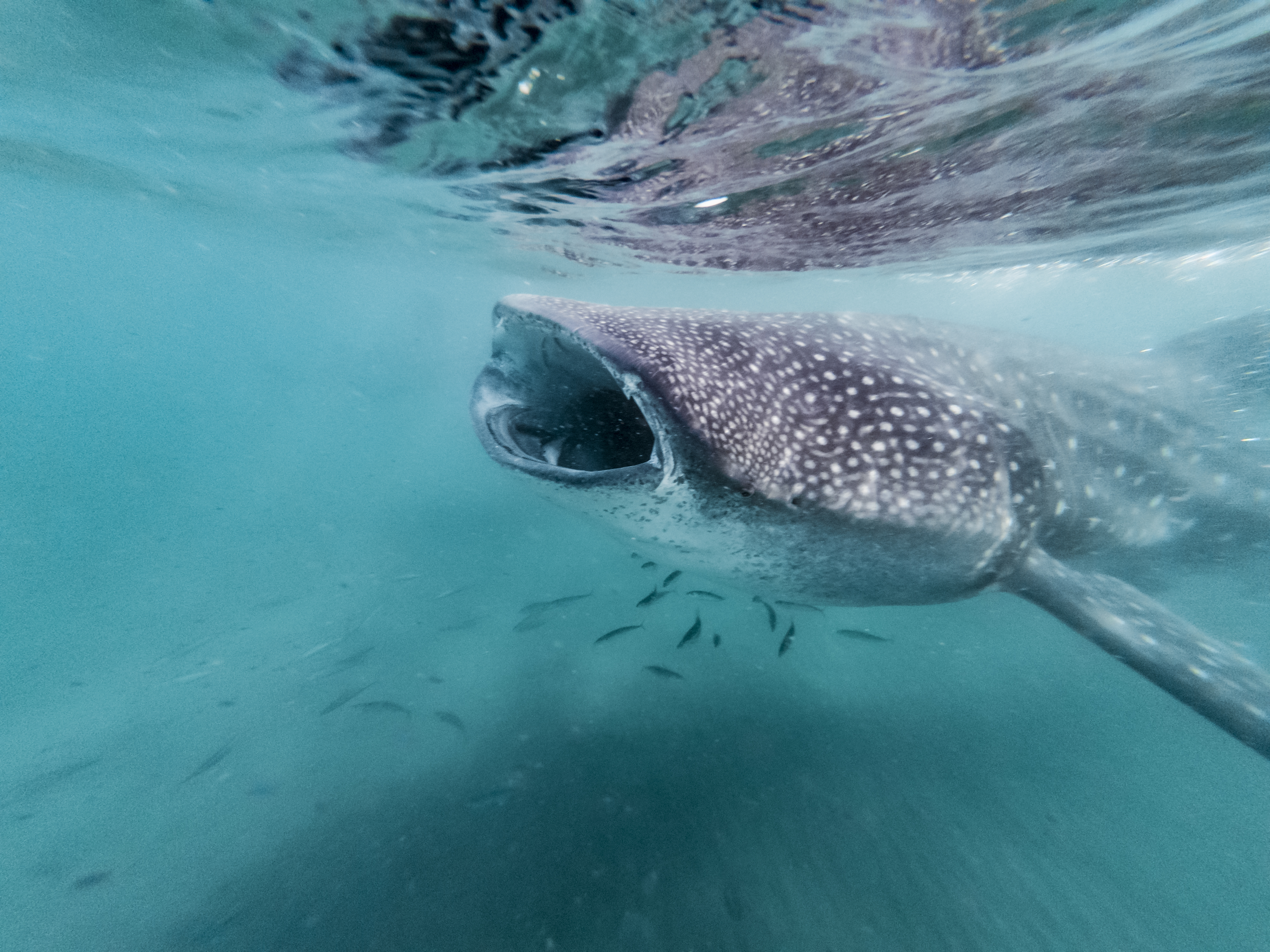
Whale shark snorkeling at La Paz Bay

Eco-tourism is by far the most important source of tourism income in La Paz, especially whale-shark snorkeling, which has been shown to impact sea-lion pup population. Tourists also visit the city's balnearios. There are some 900 islands and islets in the Gulf of California with 244 now under UNESCO protection as World Heritage Bio-Reserves and the Isla Espíritu Santo group, which borders the northeast portion of the Bay of La Paz, the primary tourist destination of the area.

La Paz is a popular destination for this type of tourism, offering activities such as diving, snorkeling, hiking, and kayaking. The Bay of La Paz is also notable for its high productivity of krill species Nyctiphanes simplex, which supports rich fisheries and attracts diverse marine predator's. Visitors are drawn to the region's rich marine life, including whale sharks, sea lions, and colorful fish, as well as its scenic coastal landscapes. Tourism supports the local economy while highlighting the need for sustainable practices to protect both wildlife and natural habitats. Studies indicate that environmental factors such as water temperature and salinity fluctuations strongly affect the larval growth of Nyctiphanes simplex, a key species at the base of the local marine food web, which in turn influence the abundance of commercially important fish and sea life.

Industries include silver mining, agriculture, fishing and pearls. Tourism is also an important source of employment for this coastal community.

The now defunct airline Aero California had its headquarters in La Paz.

== Transportation ==
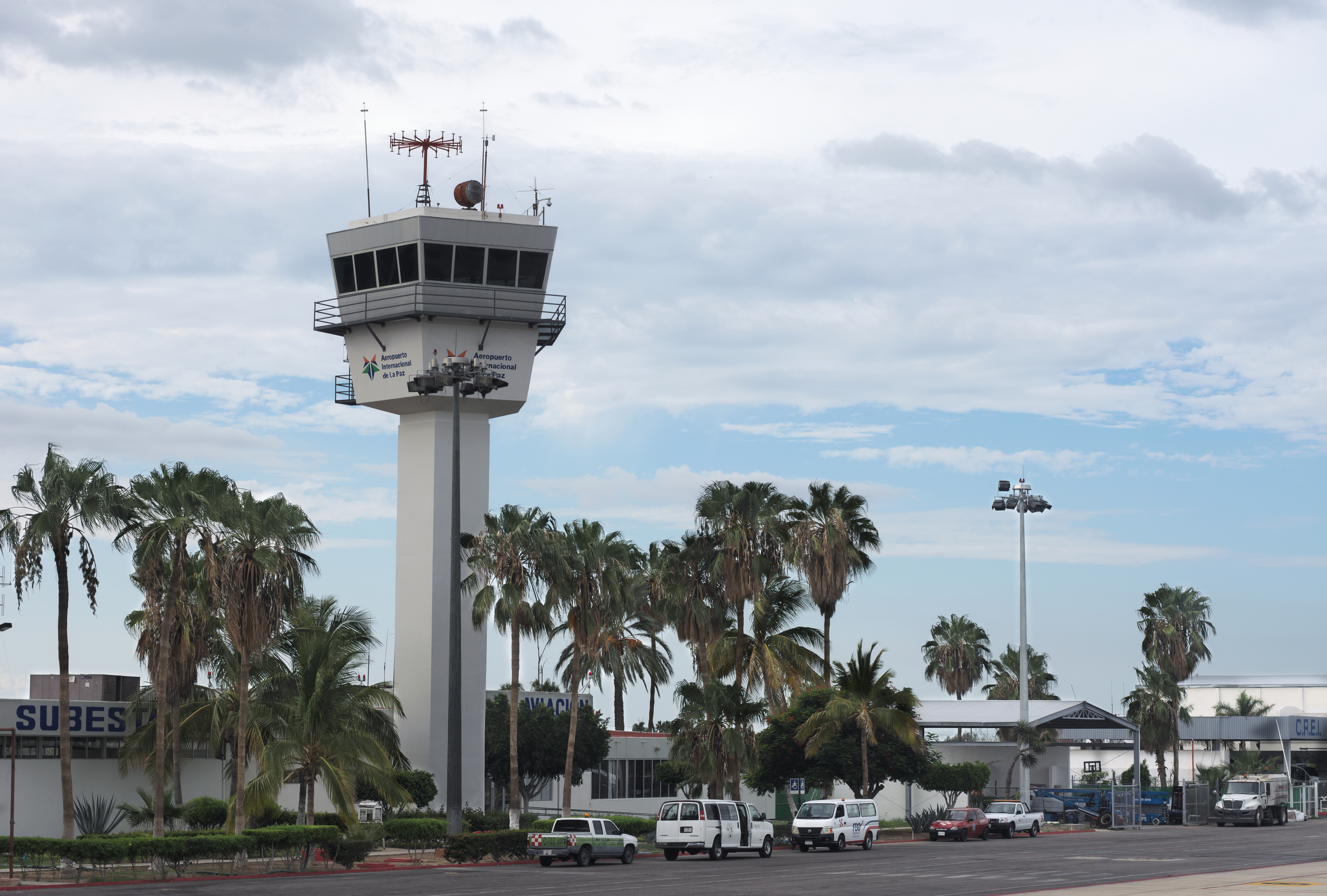
Manuel Márquez de León International Airport

La Paz is served by Manuel Márquez de León International Airport, with connecting flights on Aeroméxico Connect, Volaris, VivaAerobus, Calafia and TAR to some of Mexico's main cities (Guadalajara, Mexico City, Monterrey, Tijuana), and several northwest cities (including Chihuahua City, Ciudad Juárez, Ciudad Obregón, Culiacán, Hermosillo, Mazatlán and Querétaro). Alaska Airlines provides non stop service from Los Angeles LAX several times a week.

Two ferry services operate from the port of Pichilingue outside the city, connecting the Baja California peninsula to the mainland at Mazatlán and Topolobampo in Sinaloa.

=== Roads ===
Running along the coast in front of La Paz is 5 km (3.1 mi) long Malecon Road. The main purpose of this road is to allow easy movement across the city. However, it quickly became the focal point of tourist related activities with a large number of bars, restaurants and shops opening along its length. Since 2004 extensive development has taken place which included a large sidewalk which offers safety for large numbers of people to walk along the coastal front of La Paz.

In September 2011, a bicycle lane was added to Malecon Road, providing cyclists protection from cars and pedestrians.

La Paz is served mainly by two highways; Mexican Federal Highway 1 that links the south of the state from Cabo San Lucas to the north of the peninsula to Tijuana, and Mexican Federal Highway 19, that connects La Paz with the population of the south pacific towns such as Todos Santos and El Pescadero. It is also served by two secondary roads, the Los Planes highway (286) that connects La Paz with towns such as La Ventana, Ensenada de los Muertos and Los Planes. The other is the Pichilingue highway which links La Paz with its maritime port.

== Cuisine ==
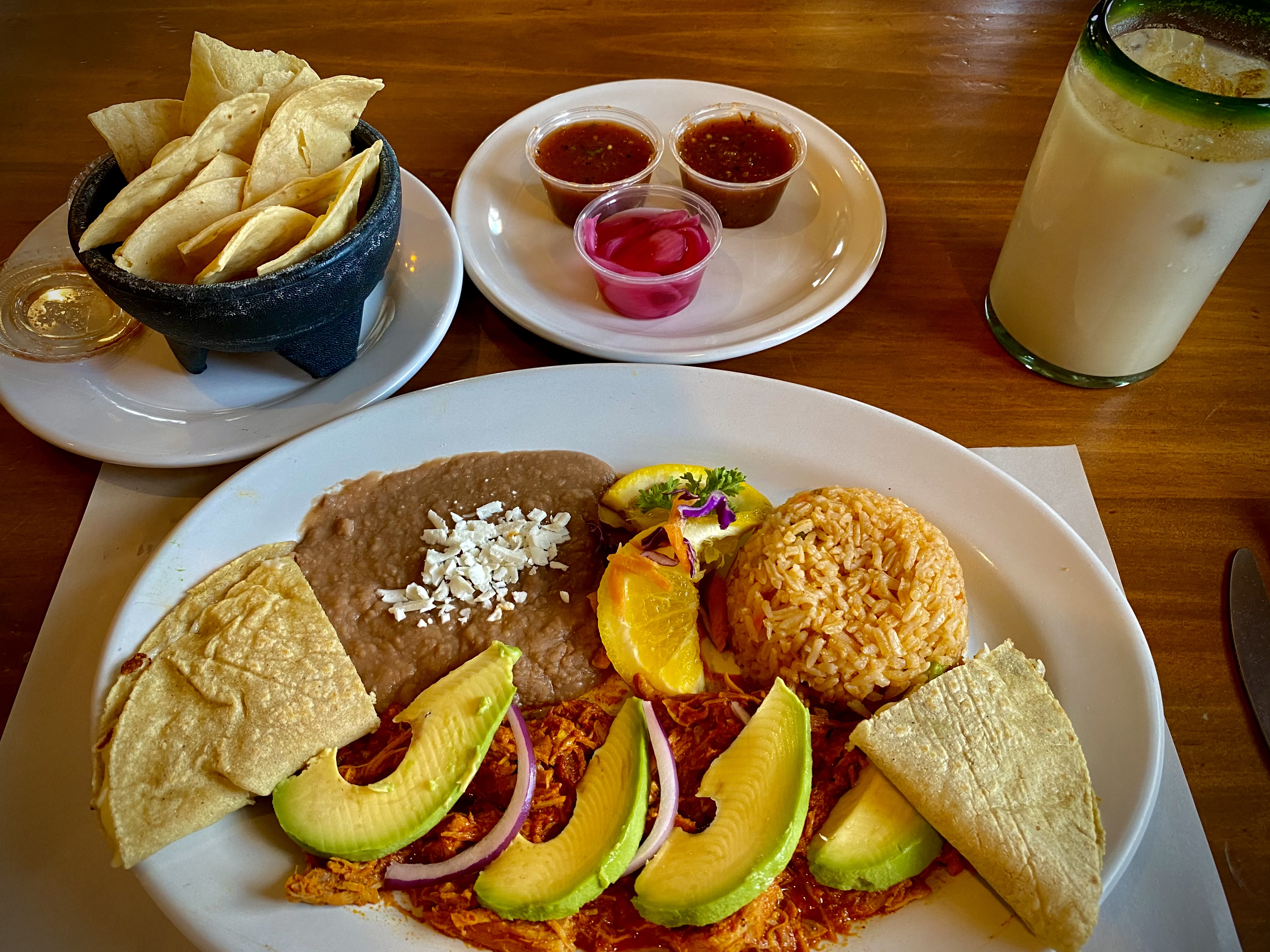
Machaca, a local dish served for breakfast

Local specialties are characterized by seafood dishes, especially of lobster, sole, clams and shrimp. Oregano is frequently used as a spice, and damiana, an ingredient in a traditional liqueur, is widely regarded as an aphrodisiac and brewed as a tea.

Regional cuisine also includes traditional dishes such as machaca, made from beef that has been well-cooked, shredded, and then cooked in its own juices, fresh cheeses and the typical flour tortillas. Abundantly available clams are prepared in various ways such as pickling, breading and frying, or stuffing. Shrimp are plentiful also, and eaten grilled, fried, or baked as in the regional specialty, filete imperial de camarones. Other popular seafood dishes include callo garra de león, made with scallops, fish tatemado, and ceviche.

Regional sweets are represented by fruits such as guava, mango and pitaya, green papaya and fig in syrup, as well as dehydrated regional fruits such as white fig and mango. Cheese empanadas (empanadas de queso) and empanadas made with sweet beans are also popular.

== Demographics ==
Historical population
Year	Pop.	±%
1960	24,253	—
1970		—
1980		—
1990	136,759	—
1995	154,314	+12.8%
2000	162,954	+5.6%
2005	189,178	+16.1%
2010	215,178	+13.7%
2015	244,219	+13.5%
2020	250,141	+2.4%

The population of La Paz has grown greatly since the 2000s. In 2020, the city had a census population of 250,141 inhabitants, with significant migrant communities from other parts of Mexico contributing to local labor, reflecting broader migration patterns to Baja California. making it the largest city in the state. Its metropolitan population is somewhat larger because of surrounding towns, such as El Centenario (pop. 6,068), Chametla (pop. 1,731 as of 2010) and San Pedro. Domestic migration, often undocumented, has historically contributed significantly to local labor in agriculture, fishing, and tourism, shaping the socio-economic landscape of La Paz. Its surrounding municipality, which is the fourth-largest municipality in Mexico in geographical size, reported a population of 290,286 inhabitants.

== Education ==
La Paz is the state capital and center of commerce, as well as the home of the three leading marine biology institutes in Latin America (UABCS, CIBNOR & CICIMAR), largely because it sits on the Gulf of California, which is home to exceptional marine biodiversity. It also supports several other university-level institutes of learning, such as the Universidad Autonoma de Baja California Sur.

La Paz is the headquarters of several higher education centers, the main ones being:

- Universidad Autónoma de Baja California Sur (UABCS)
- Universidad Tecnológica de La Paz (UTLP)
- Instituto Tecnológico de La Paz (ITLP)
- Universidad Mundial (UM)
- Centro Interdisciplinario de Ciencias Marinas (CICIMAR)
- Centro de Investigaciones Biológicas del Noroeste (CIBNOR)
- Centro de Investigación Científica y de Educación Superior de Ensenada (CICESE) Campus La Paz
- Benemérita Escuela Normal Urbana Prof. Domingo Carballo Félix (BENU)
- Escuela Normal Superior del Estado de Baja California Sur (ENSBCS)
- Universidad Internacional de La Paz (UNIPAZ)
- Universidad de Tijuana Campus La Paz (CUT)
- Tecnológico de Baja California
- Universidad Católica Campus La Paz
- Universidad del Desarrollo Profesional (UNIDEP) Plantel La Paz
- Universidad Intercontinental
- Instituto Mar de Cortés
- Instituto Cultural Tecnológico Cuincacalli (ICTEC)
- Centro de Capacitación para el Trabajo Industrial (CECATI 39)
- Escuela Superior de Cultura Física para Baja California Sur (ESCUFI)

== Health ==
La Paz has several medical centers; the Secretariat of Health operates the Juan María de Salvatierra general hospital, which has medical specialists and an exclusive area for pediatric oncology, as well as a unit that provides medical care under the national health insurance program, as well as a hemodialysis unit, a blood bank, a mental health division, health centers and other units. The Mexican Social Security Institute (IMSS) provides a family clinic and an ambulatory medical unit in which ambulatory surgeries are performed. There is also a new ISSSTE hospital, the Naval Sanatorium, and the Secretariat of National Defense hospital, which offers external consultation services, hospitalization and medical specialists.

Reflecting high national rates, there are similarly high local rates of diabetes mellitus, arterial hypertension, and renal insufficiency, as well as of automobile accidents resulting in injury, despite public health dissemination programs and driver education programs.

According to the Baja California Sur State Development Plan 2005–2011, during 2006 there were 24 deaths due to cervical cancer in the state. The health sector seeks to reduce cervical cancer mortality by providing timely treatment to women aged 25 to 64 years, and improving the efficiency of diagnostic laboratories and the monitoring of patients.

As of 1 March 2021, the municipality reported 11,558 recoveries, 577 active cases, and 436 deaths from the COVID-19 pandemic in Mexico.

== Culture ==
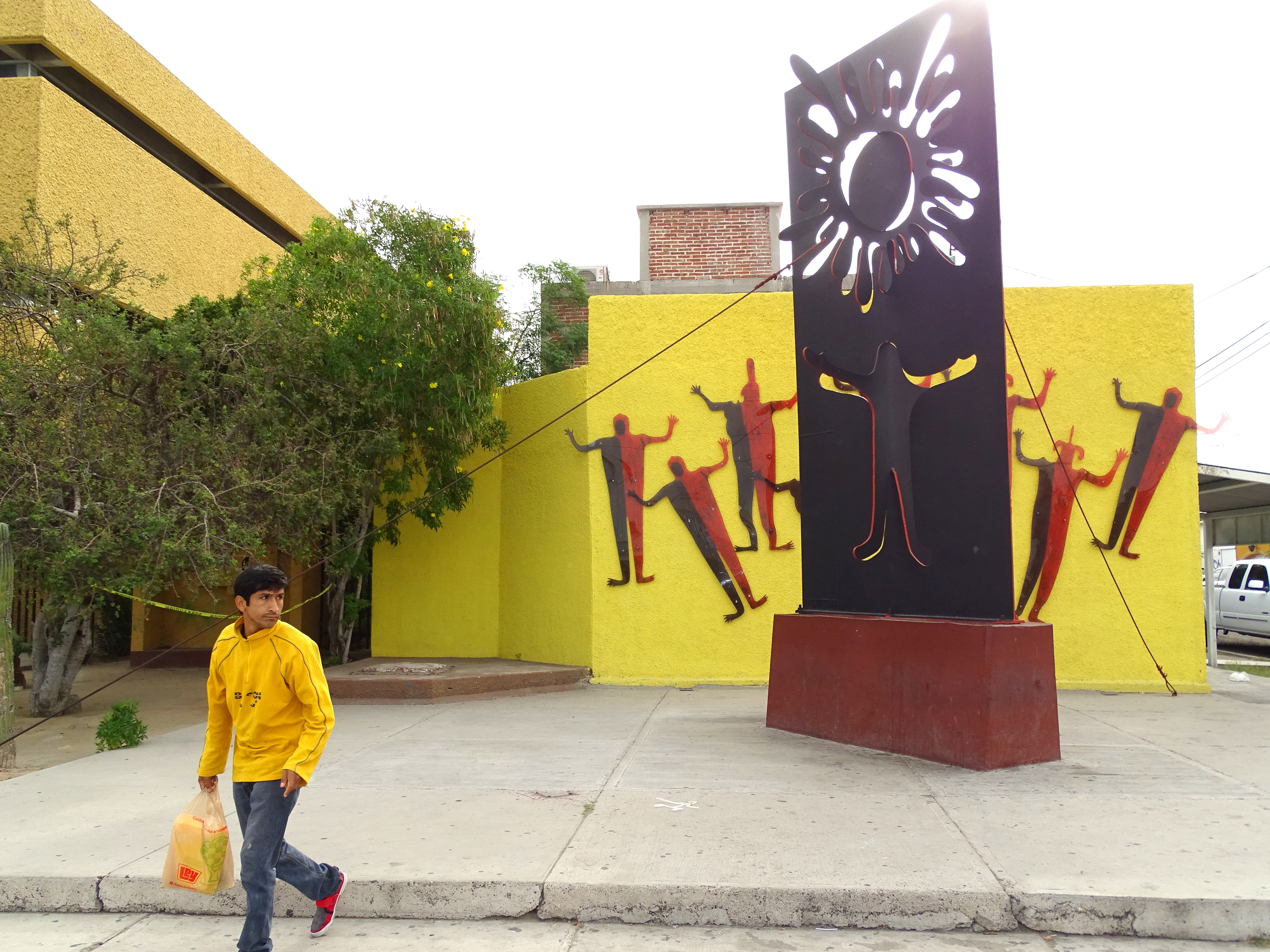
Main entrance at Regional Museum of Anthropology and History of Baja California Sur

=== Museums ===
Currently, La Paz has three museums which are the Regional Museum of Anthropology and History of Baja California Sur, the Art Museum of Baja California Sur and the Museum of Whale and Marine Sciences.

The Regional Museum of Anthropology and History of Baja California Sur was opened in 1981 and displays a collection of diverse items from fossils and archaeological artifacts to colonial and post-independence artifacts. There are five halls in the museum, which are: Introductory Hall, containing fossils found in the state and dioramas of the flora and fauna of the peninsula; Archaeology Hall, showing the first inhabitants of the Baja California Peninsula; Art Rock Hall, depicting replicas of the famous rock paintings at San Francisco; Colonial Hall, showing the first contact with Europeans and the establishment of Jesuit Missions in the peninsula; Independence, Revolution and XX Century Hall, depicting the history of Baja California Sur from the Independence of Mexico to modern times.

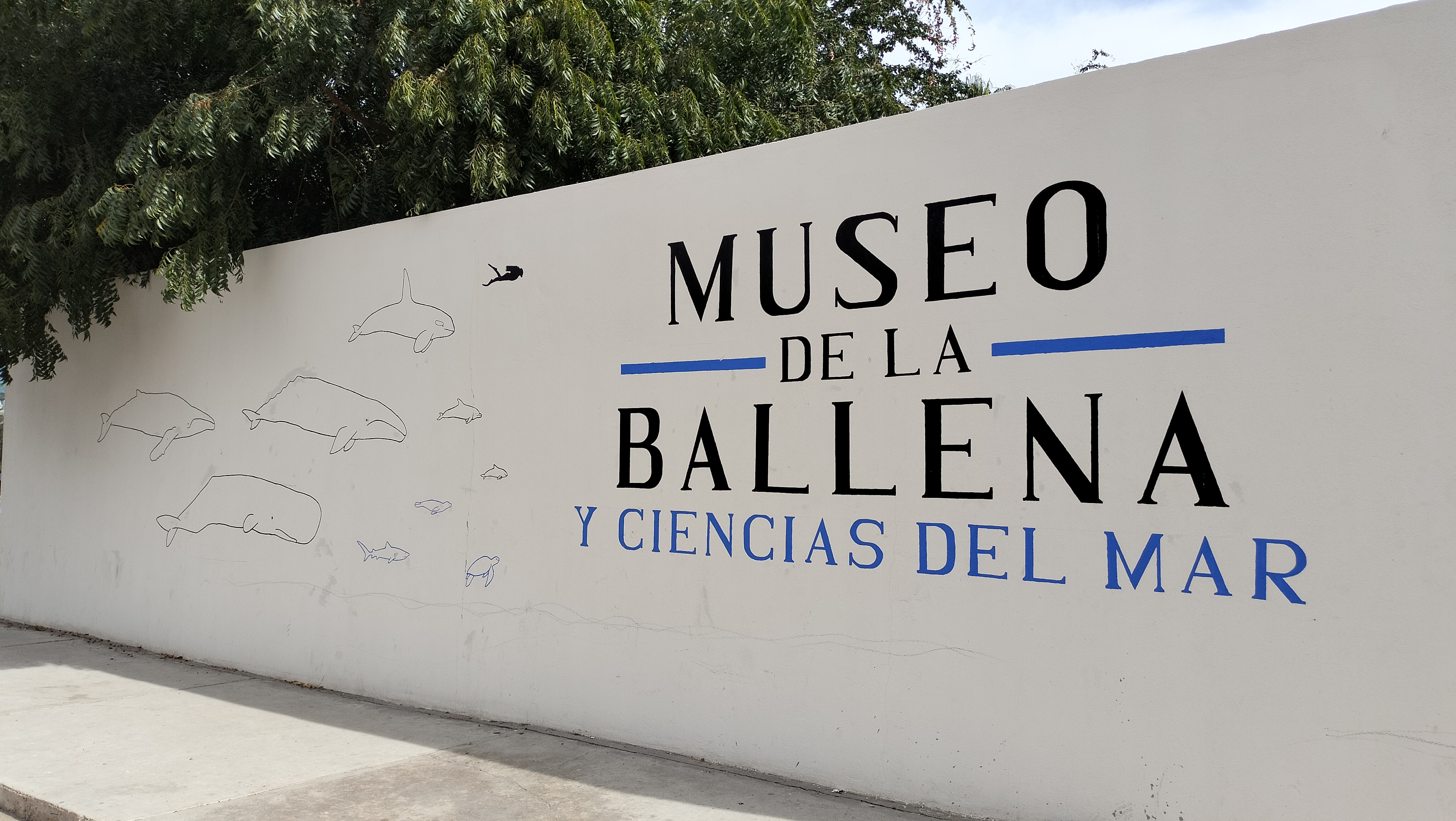
Museum of Whale and Marine Sciences

The Art Museum of Baja California Sur was opened in 2020 in the former Governor House, and exhibits works from local artists, but also from national and international artists. It is also a cultural space, in which booked presentations and classical musical concerts are held.

The Museum of Whale and Marine Sciences is located at Jesús Castro Agúndez Cultural Unit, originally opened in 2016 nearby the La Paz Promenade, the museum was translocated to its current location in 2019, and reopened in 2021. The museum exhibits a collection of 36 cetaceans skeletons, also showing the evolution and biodiversity of cetaceans in Mexico.

=== Landmarks ===
Landmarks and monuments of La Paz

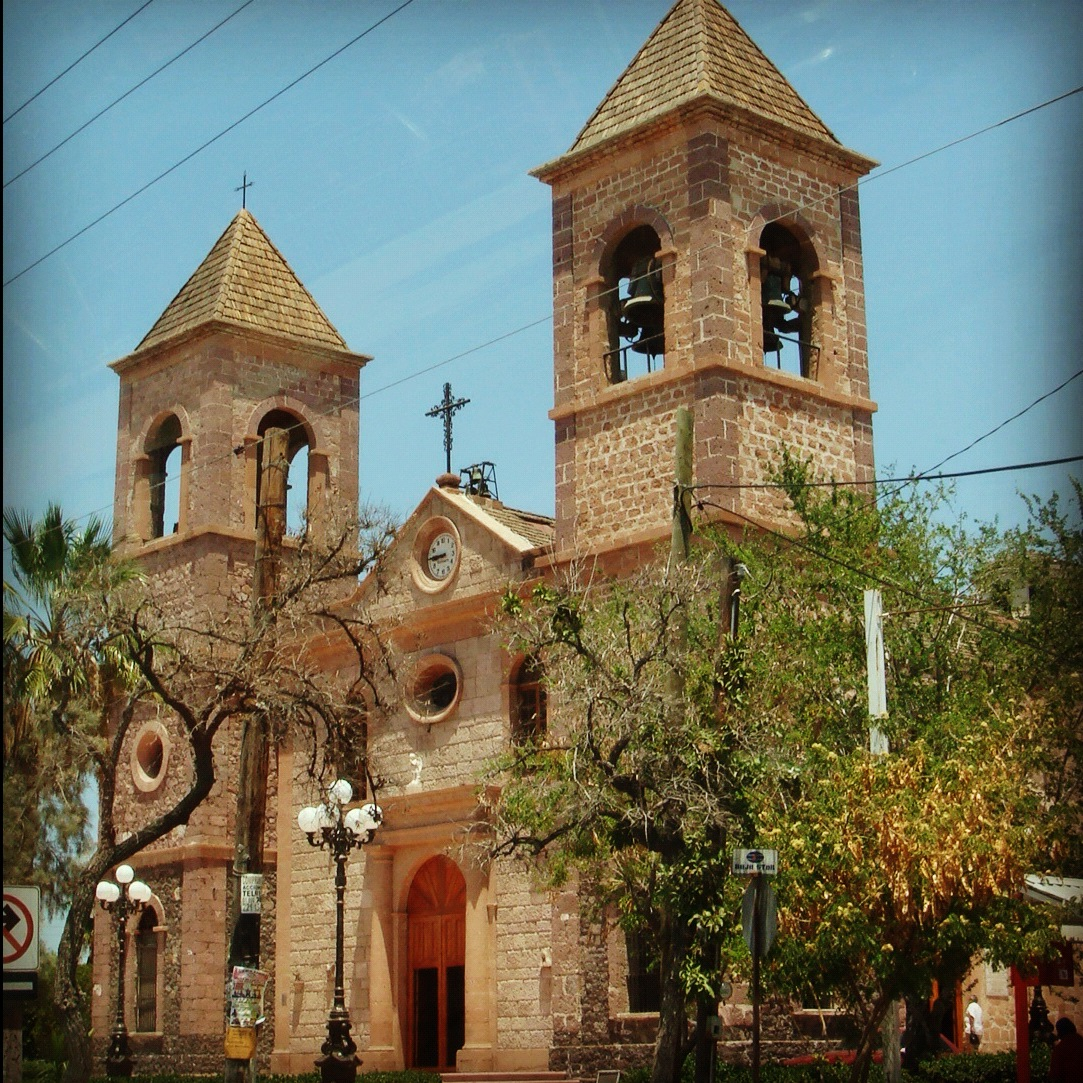
Our Lady of Peace Cathedral, built in 1860.

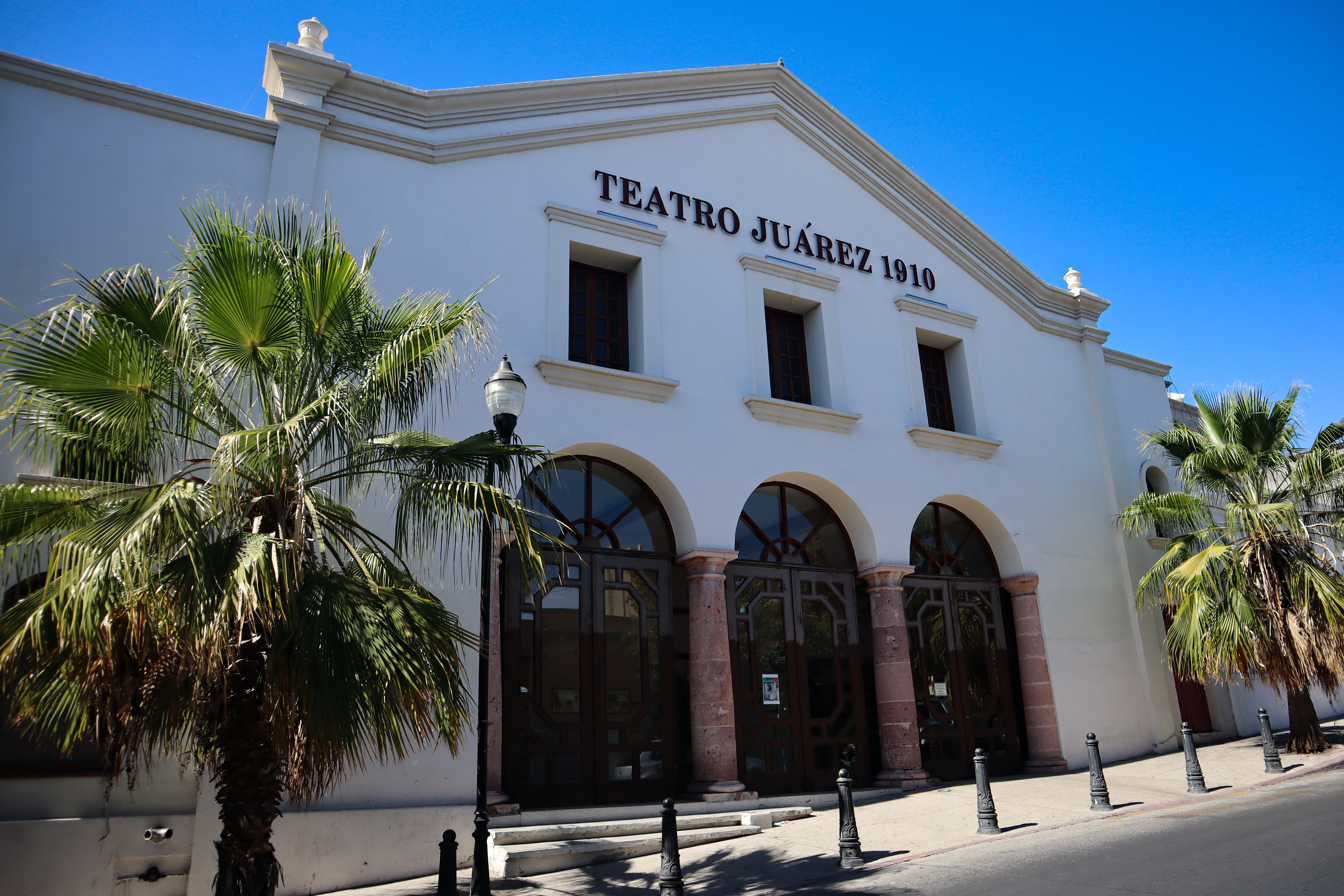
Juárez Theater, built in 1910.

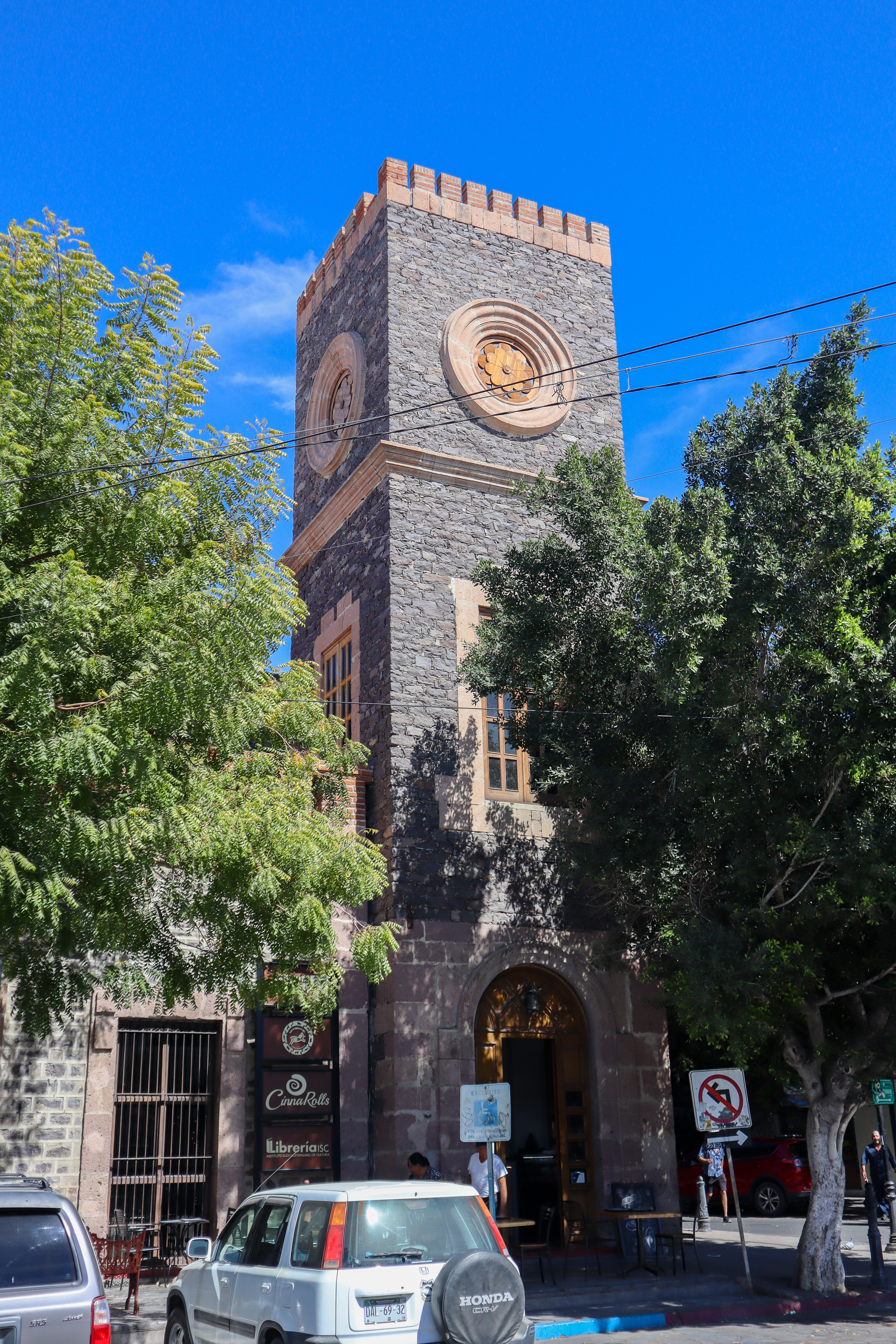
La Paz Former City Hall, now a cultural precinct.

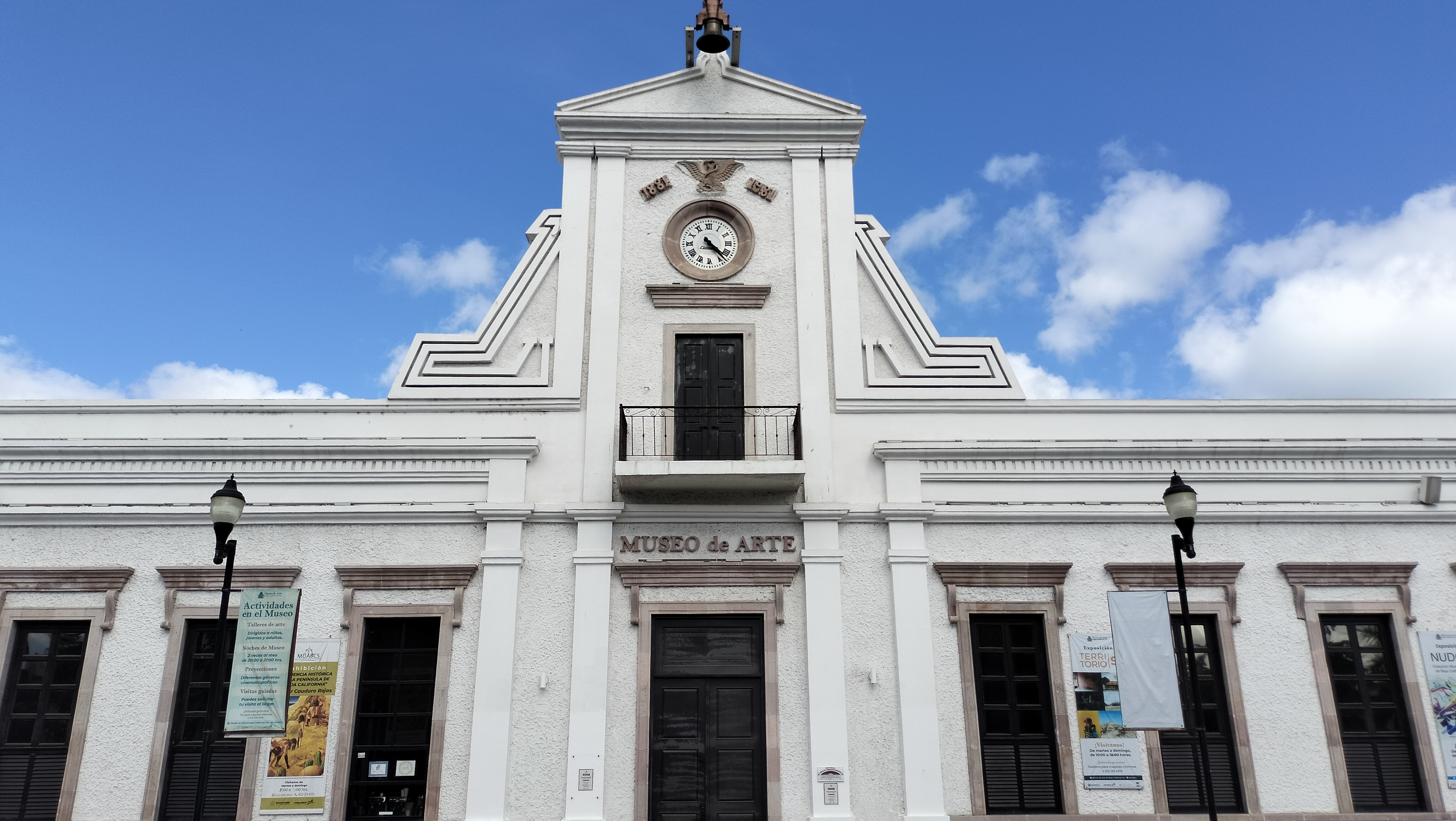
Former Governor Palace, now the Art Museum of Baja California Sur.

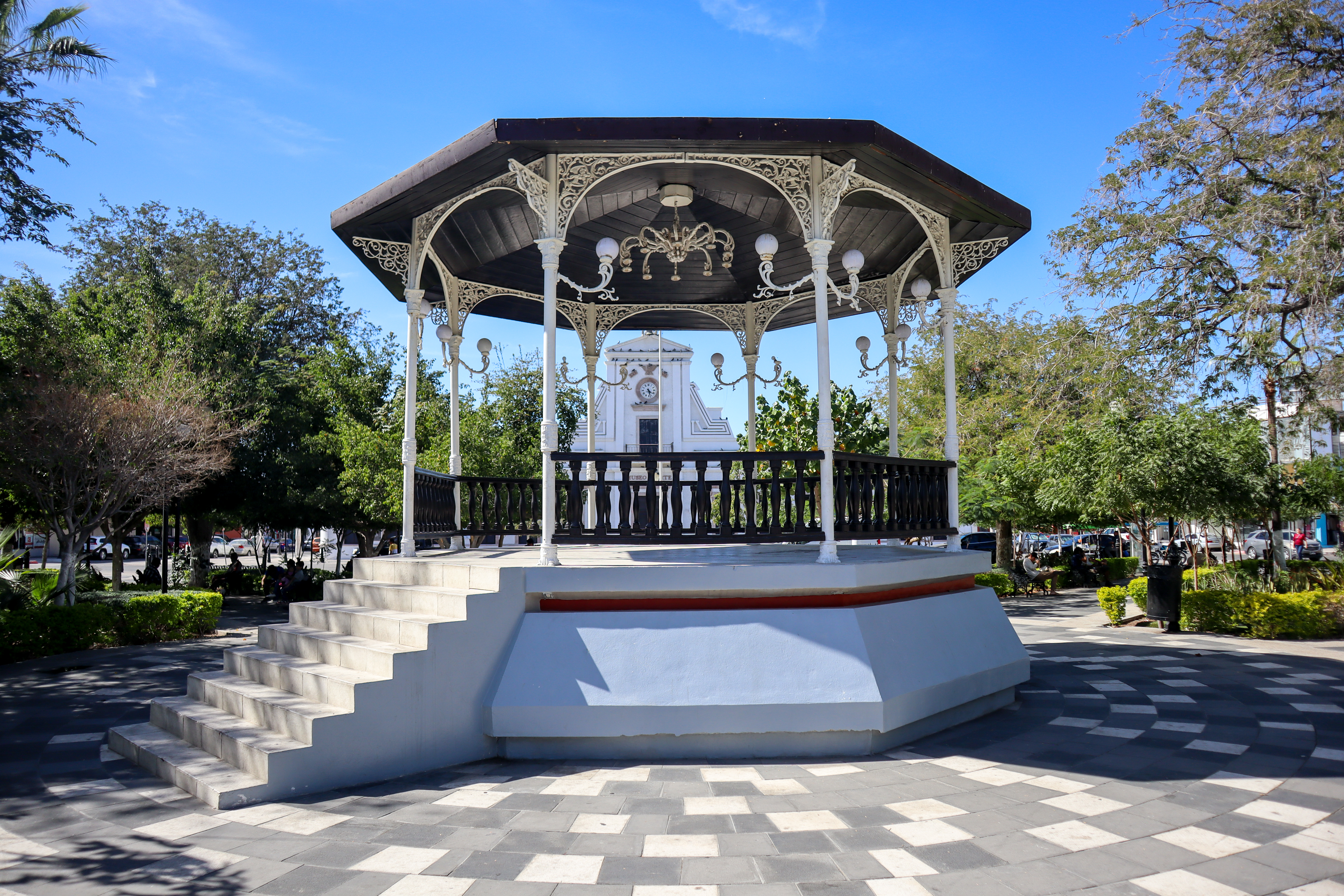
Velasco Garden.

== In popular culture ==
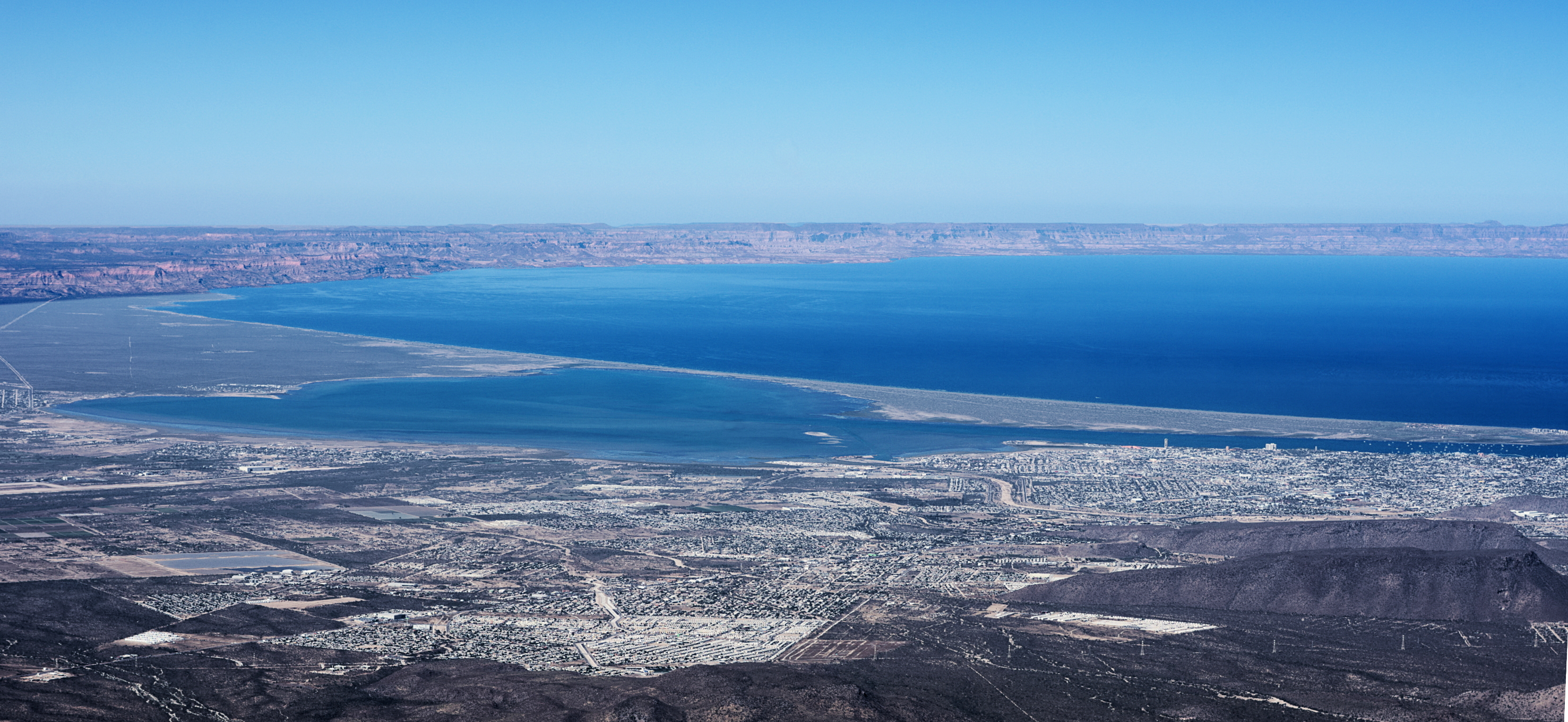
Aerial view towards south La Paz

John Steinbeck visited La Paz in 1940. He describes the town in his 1947 novel The Pearl and mentions it extensively in his 1951 travelogue The Log from the Sea of Cortez.

The city is also the setting of the 1967 Scott O'Dell children's novel The Black Pearl, chosen as a Newbery Honor Book in 1968; La Paz is the home of the main character.

La Paz is home to several festivals celebrating local culture, including the annual Carnaval La Paz, one of the oldest festival on the Baja Peninsula, featuring parades, music, and traditional dances that reflect both Indigenous and colonial influences.

== Sister cities ==
- Ensenada, Mexico
- Redondo Beach, United States
- Rosarito, Mexico
- Tijuana, Mexico
- Tlajomulco de Zúñiga, Mexico
- Alexandria, Virginia, United States
- Clearwater, Florida, United States
- Vigo, Spain
- Saint-Tropez, France
- Düsseldorf, Germany

== See also ==
- Mexican Riviera
- Tourism in Mexico
