= El Mogote =

Peninsula in Mexico

- Peninsula
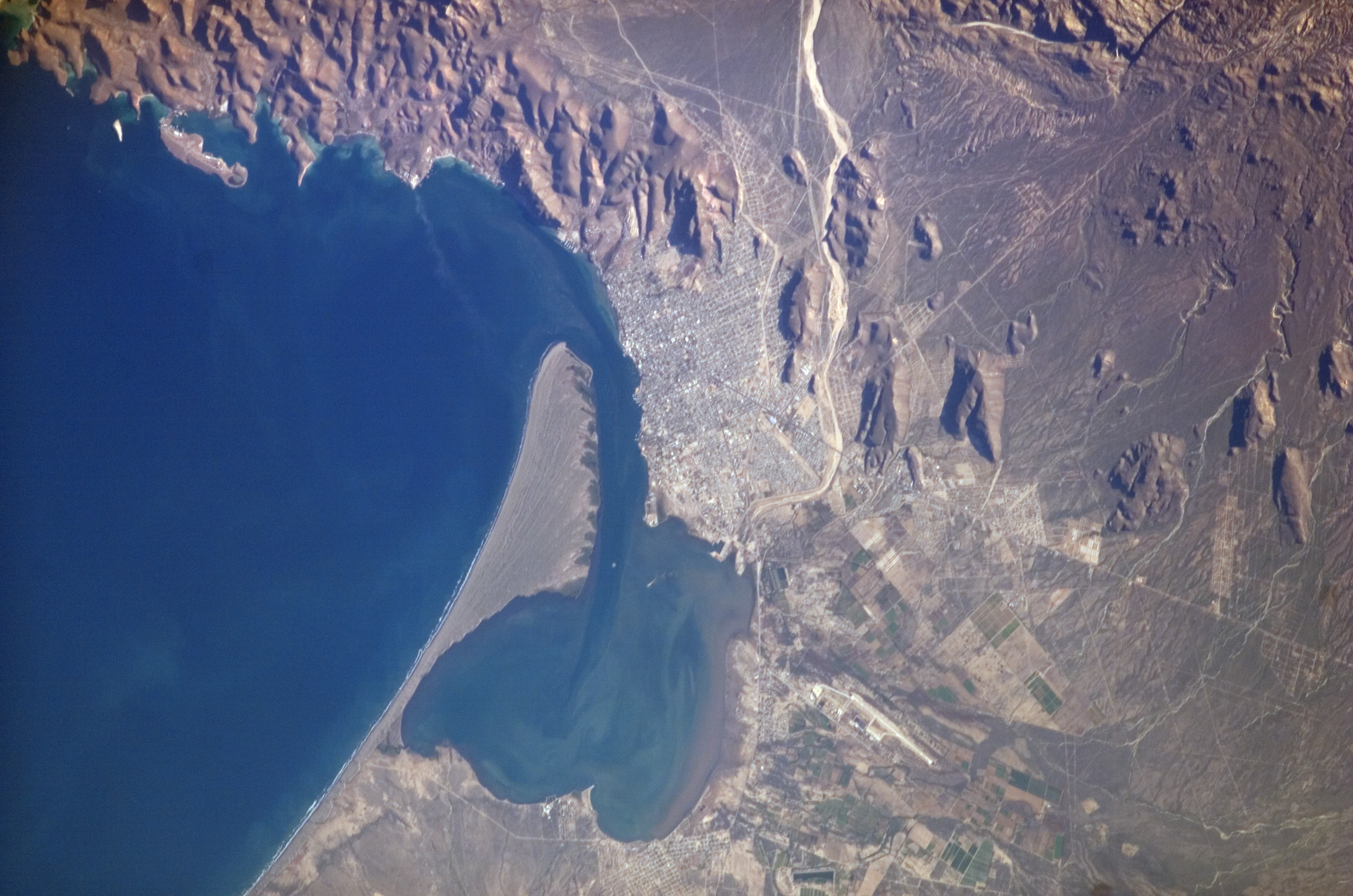
- El Mogote from space, 2003. (North is left.)

- Location of El Mogote in Baja California Sur
- Coordinates: 24.163°N 110.362°W
- Location: Baja California Sur, Mexico

Ramsar Wetland
- Official name: Humedales Mogote - Ensenada La Paz
- Designated: 2 February 2008
- Reference no.: 1816

El Mogote is a sand barrier peninsula opposite the city of La Paz in Baja California Sur, Mexico. The peninsula forms the northern shore of the Bay of La Paz. The peninsula is arid, with extensive dunes at its neck. Clusters of mangroves are established on the southern shore of the peninsula. The mangroves are considered important habitat for local and migratory birds, as well as marine life and are listed under the Ramsar Convention.

== Paraiso del Mar ==
El Mogote is the location of Paraiso del Mar, a resort development on 688 hectares (1,700 acres) on the eastern portion of the peninsula. The development, begun in 2005, was planned to include over 3,000 homes and condominiums, two golf courses, a marina, a town plaza and various other amenities. Land acquisition and development began despite concerns that the project would damage the ecology of the peninsula and surrounding waters.

In August 2011, the developer, Luis Raymundo Cano Hernández, abandoned the project. In October 2012, he abandoned operation of the golf course. As of 2014 the new owner of the development was searching for a buyer.

There are approximately 170 owners who have formed an HOA to manage the property. There are 91 homes built and 120 condo units. There is one golf course, also currently operated by the HOA and it is open to the public, under the name "The Golf Club at El Mogote". Potable water is provided by a desalination plant.

There are two methods of access to the development; an unpaved road, and a scheduled ferry from the La Paz malecon.

Portions of the partly completed development have been described as an eyesore. As of 2013 Mexican federal courts had ruled the development illegal and had directed all further development to cease.
