= Toyota TZ engine =

Overview
- Manufacturer: Toyota
- Production: 1990–2000

Layout
- Configuration: Inline-4
- Displacement: 2.4 L (2,438 cc)
- Cylinder bore: 95 mm (3.74 in)
- Piston stroke: 86 mm (3.39 in)
- Valvetrain: DOHC 4 valves x cyl.
- Compression ratio: 8.9:1, 9.3:1

Combustion
- Supercharger: With intercooler
- Fuel system: Fuel injection
- Fuel type: Gasoline
- Cooling system: Water-cooled

Output
- Power output: 99–118 kW (133–158 hp; 135–160 PS)
- Torque output: 206–258 N⋅m (152–190 lb⋅ft)

Chronology
- Predecessor: Toyota Y engine
- Successor: 2AZ-FE

The Toyota TZ engine is a series of water-cooled inline four-cylinder gasoline engines from Toyota Motor Corporation. The engines feature dual overhead camshafts (DOHC) and 4 valves per cylinder. The supercharged 2TZ-FZE features an intercooler.

The TZ supplanted the Toyota Y engine in the Toyota Estima/Previa when it replaced the Toyota Van.

== Production ==
Production leadtime

- 1990 May – 2000 January (for country)

== 2TZ-FE ==
- Naturally aspirated
- Compression ratio: 9.3:1
- Reference output: 99 kW (133 hp; 135 PS) @ 5,000 rpm
- Reference torque: 206 N⋅m (152 lb⋅ft) @ 4,000 rpm

Applications:

- Estima (TCR10W/11W/20W/21W)
- Estima Emina/Lucida (TCR10G/11G/20G/21G)
- 2015–2016 GAC Changfeng Liebao Q6 (Four wheel drive based on the Mitsubishi Pajero V20 for the Chinese market under GAC Changfeng since 1995; aka Liebao Heijingang/Qibing (2002/2009 until 2014)

== 2TZ-FZE ==
- Supercharged (Roots type)
- Compression ratio: 8.9:1
- Reference output: 120 kW (161 hp; 163 PS) @ 5,000 rpm
- Reference torque: 273 N⋅m (201 lb⋅ft) @ 3,600 rpm

Applications:

- Estima (TCR10W/11W/20W/21W)
