= Volkswagen Transporter (T5) =

Fifth generation of the Volkswagen Transporter

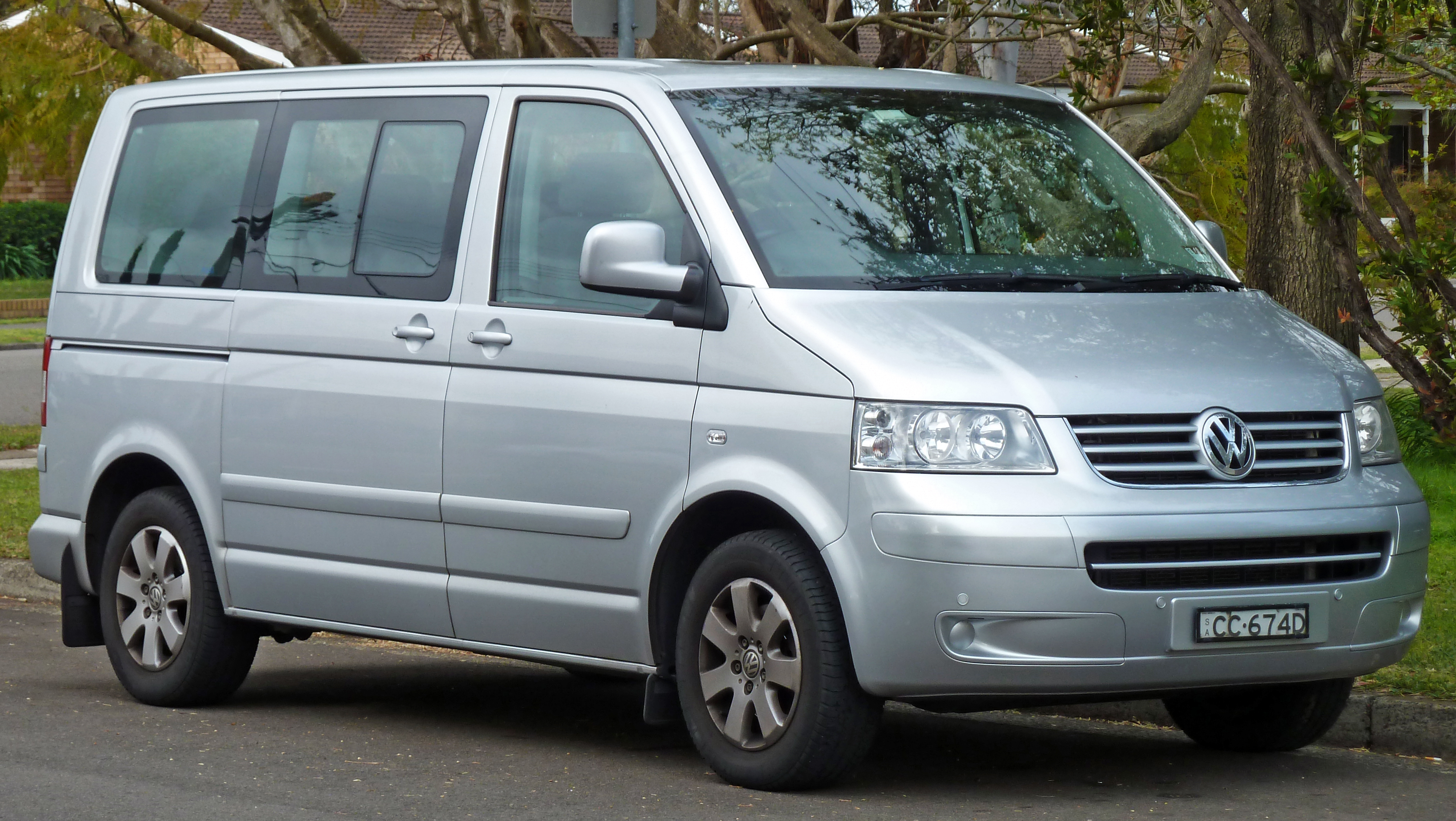

Overview
- Manufacturer: Volkswagen Commercial Vehicles
- Also called: Volkswagen Caravelle; Volkswagen Multivan; Volkswagen California; Volkswagen Eurovan (Mexico)
- Production: 2003–2015
- Assembly: Germany: Hanover (Hannover Plant); Poland: Poznań; Russia: Kaluga (Transporter, Caravelle, Multivan); Indonesia: Jakarta (National Assemblers)

Body and chassis
- Class: Light commercial vehicle (M)
- Body style: Van (cargo/passenger); Pick-up; Minibus; Crew cab chassis cab Campervan
- Layout: Front-engine, front-wheel drive or four-wheel-drive
- Platform: Volkswagen Group T5 platform

Powertrain
- Engine: 2.0 L I4 (petrol); 3.2 L VR6 (petrol); 1.9 L I4 TDI (diesel); 2.0 L I4 TDI (diesel); 2.5 L I5 TDI (diesel)
- Transmission: 5-speed manual 6-speed manual 6-speed automatic 7-speed automatic (DSG) (Note: Facelifted model.)

Dimensions
- Wheelbase: 3,000 mm (118.1 in); 3,400 mm (133.9 in)
- Length: 4,892 mm (192.6 in); 5,290 mm (208.3 in); 5,292 mm (208.3 in)
- Width: 1,904 mm (75.0 in); 1,959 mm (77.1 in)
- Height: 1,935 mm (76.2 in); 1,990 mm (78.3 in); 2,176 mm (85.7 in); 2,476 mm (97.5 in); 1,949 mm (76.7 in) (double cab); 1,963 mm (77.3 in) (chassis cab)

Chronology
- Predecessor: Volkswagen Transporter (T4)
- Successor: Volkswagen Transporter (T6)

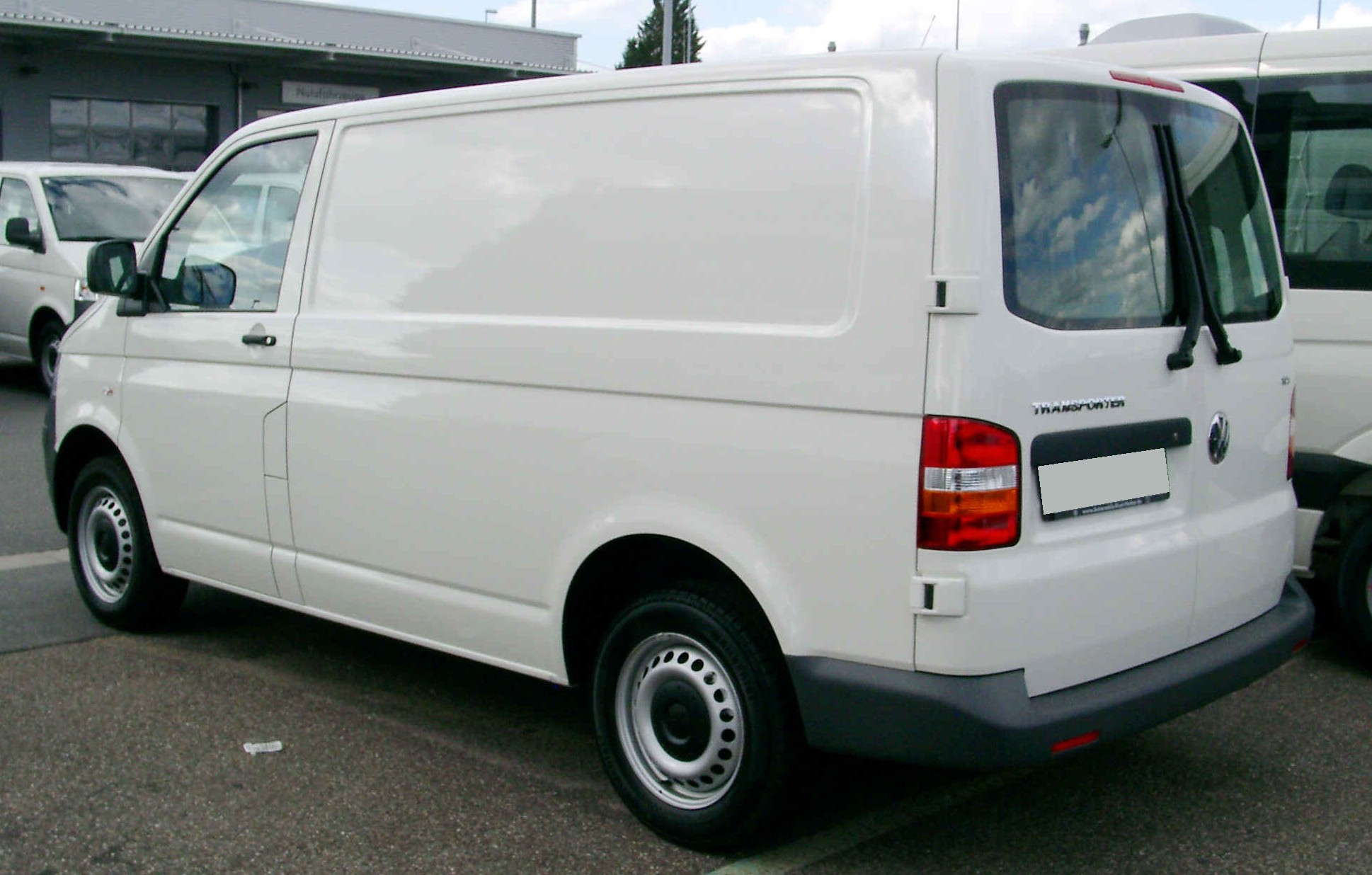
Transporter pre-facelift (2003–2010)

The Volkswagen Transporter T5 range is the fifth generation of Volkswagen Commercial Vehicles (VWCV/VWN) 'Transporter' series of medium-sized light commercial vehicles and the people mover Caravelle/Multivan range. It was launched on 6 October 2002, and went into full production on 25 April 2003, replacing the fourth generation T4 Transporter range.

The key markets for the T5 range are Germany, the United Kingdom, Taiwan, Russia, France, Turkey, and Singapore. The T5 range was not sold in the United States and Canada due to poor sales of the T4-based Volkswagen EuroVan. In lieu of the T5, Volkswagen marketed the Canadian-built Routan, a minivan derived from the Chrysler RT platform.

== Overview ==
The Transporter is the commercial workhorse in the T5 range, available in over 100 combinations. Variants include short- (SWB), or long-wheelbases (LWB); along with low-, medium-, or high-rooflines; and can be configured as a van, minibus, single-cab, double-cab, drop side or chassis truck.

=== Body types ===
A brief view of the Transporter T5 range:

- Panel Van – Delivery van without side windows or rear seats,
- Highroof Panel Van – Delivery van with raised roof. There is also a third mid-roof height available with the T5, between the two traditional ones
- Half-panel – Van with side windows only in the front half of the cargo area and one row of removable rear seats,
- Pick-up – Flatbed truck, also available with wider load bed,
- Crew Cab Pick-up, in German: Doppelkabine – Flatbed truck with double cab and two rows of seats,
- Cab Chassis – (both single and crew cab), for coach builders to build special bodies onto,
- Kombi, from German: Kombinationskraftwagen (combination vehicle) – Van with side windows and removable rear seats, i.e. both a passenger and a cargo vehicle combined. Also available with heightened roof,
- Shuttle (8-11 seater) minibus,
- Taxi, along with Police, Fire, and Ambulance emergency services vehicles are made by Volkswagen Commercial Vehicles (VWCV) through Special Vehicle Order (SVO), although this option is not available in all markets.

Apart from these factory variants there are a multitude of third-party conversions available, some of which are offered through the VWCV/VWN dealer organisation. They include refrigerated vans, ambulances, police vans, fire engines, ladder trucks, campervans and so on.

The full cargo payload potential of the Transporter is between 750 kilograms (1,653 lb) to 1.4 tonnes. Load compartment volumes range from 5.8 m^{3} (200 cu ft) to 9.3 m^{3} (330 cu ft).

In Mexico, the T5 range was marketed under the nameplate Transporter, like Europe.

=== People movers ===
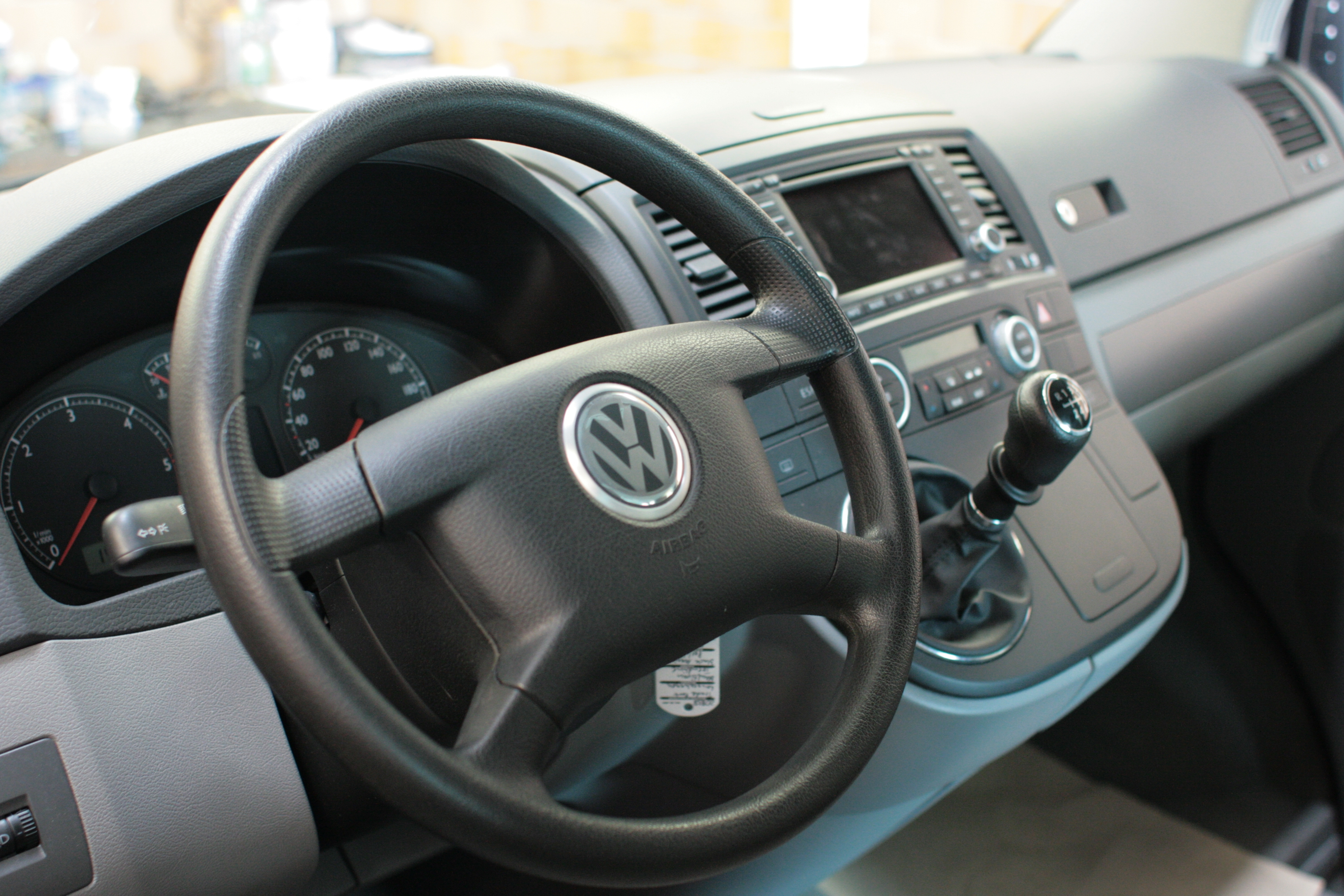
Interior (2003)

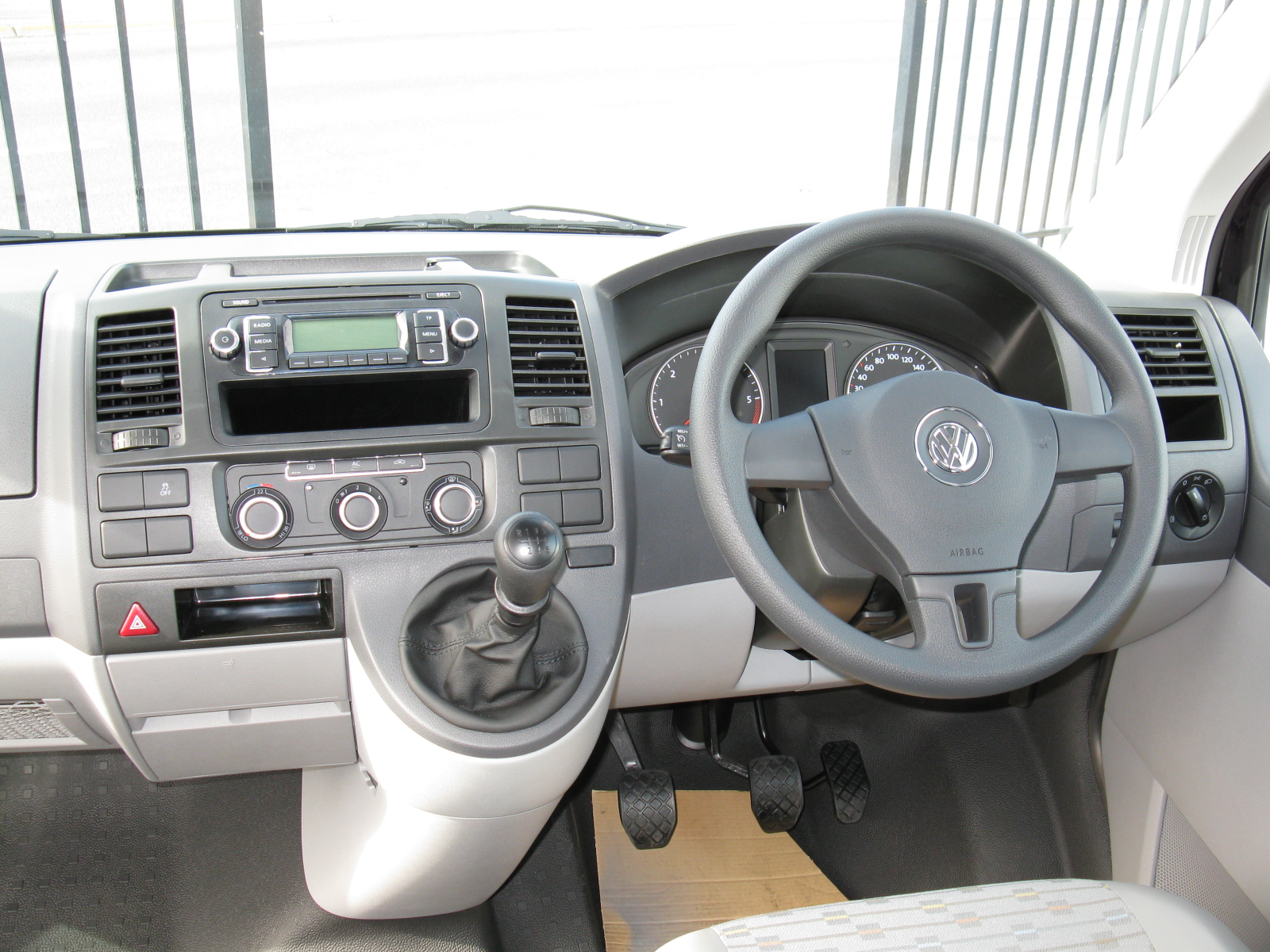
Interior (2010)

The T5 is also available in four- to eleven-seat configurations called Shuttle, Kombi, Caravelle, and Multivan.

- Kombi: This is the entry level people mover in the Transporter range. It is available with every internal combustion engine in the T5 range, and in all roof heights and wheelbases. The Kombi can seat four to eleven people. It is equipped with basic features such as rubber flooring, heater for driver's compartment, and side panel trim and headlining in the driver's compartment. Optional features include central locking, air conditioning for front and rear compartments, electrically controlled and heated mirrors, sliding windows, Electronic Stability Programme (ESP), side and curtain airbags, cruise control, electric windows, sunroof, and an electric sliding door.
- Shuttle: This is the next level up, is only available in SWB and LWB, with the full engine range, but is limited to the standard roof height. The Shuttle seats seven to eleven people. Standard features are moulded trim, a second heater, sun blinds for the passenger compartment, and a sliding window on the left hand side only. Optional extras over the Kombi include carpeting and an 'Appearance Package', which includes colour-coded bumpers, double folding rear three-seater bench seat, and a luggage compartment light.
- Caravelle: This includes most of the Kombi and Shuttle features already standard, plus ESP, Anti-lock Braking System (ABS), Anti-Slip Regulation (ASR – more commonly known as traction control system), passenger's seat with adjustable lumbar support, air conditioning, electrically adjustable and heated mirrors, and armrests for front-seat passenger and driver. Optional features include Automatic Tailgate Power Closing system, and multi-disc CD changer. The Caravelle is only available in SWB or LWB, with a maximum of ten seats.
- Multivan: This is the range-topping people mover based on the T5 platform. Available with six or seven seats, it has a unique rail feature in which seats can slide forward and backward into any configuration. A wide range of accessories are available, like tables and refrigerators which fit into the rails to be secured or movable if necessary. The Multivan has all safety features as standard such as ABS, ESP, ASR, and front, side, and curtain airbags. The Multivan is sold under the Caravelle nameplate in the UK.

== Variants ==
=== Sportline ===
The Transporter Sportline is the range-topping trim level of the Transporter panel and Kombi van. It comes as standard with a 174 PS (128 kW; 172 bhp) Turbocharged Direct Injection (TDI) diesel engine, generating torque of 400 newton-metres (295 lbf⋅ft) at 2,000 rpm, and is mated to a six-speed manual gearbox.

The vehicles have a wide range of options including an acoustic cabin option which makes the van feel more like a car.

Other standard features on the Sportline include 18-inch weight-rated alloy wheels, body-coloured bumpers, door mirrors and handles. It features suspension which is lowered by 30 millimetres (1.2 in) over standard variants, and has chrome side bars and grille, a roof spoiler, as well as a special Volkswagen badge.

The Sportline featured in an episode of Top Gear TV series; where Clarkson, Hammond and May had to choose three vans to compete in a series of challenges, including transporting equipment for The Who. Jeremy Clarkson claimed the Sportline to be "the fastest van in Britain".

This claim was put to the test by competitor TV programme Fifth Gear where the Sportline has been put head to head with The A-Team van, as well as the Mercedes-Benz Vito Sport-X. The Sportline comfortably won a race against the A-Team GMC van, even with Tiff Needell cutting corners and using short cuts in the vein of the television series. Against the Sport-X, even though the Mercedes had a more powerful engine, it was found that the traction control was too sensitive and overtly intrusive to be able to make quick progress around a track.

=== California campervan ===
The California and California (Kombi) Beach constitute the Volkswagen Commercial Vehicles campervan range, designed and built in-house on the T5 platform.

The 'California' is a fully equipped camper with beds, sink, and fold-up seat and tables. The 'California Beach' is an entry-level model that comes with just a fold-up bed.

== Facelift ==
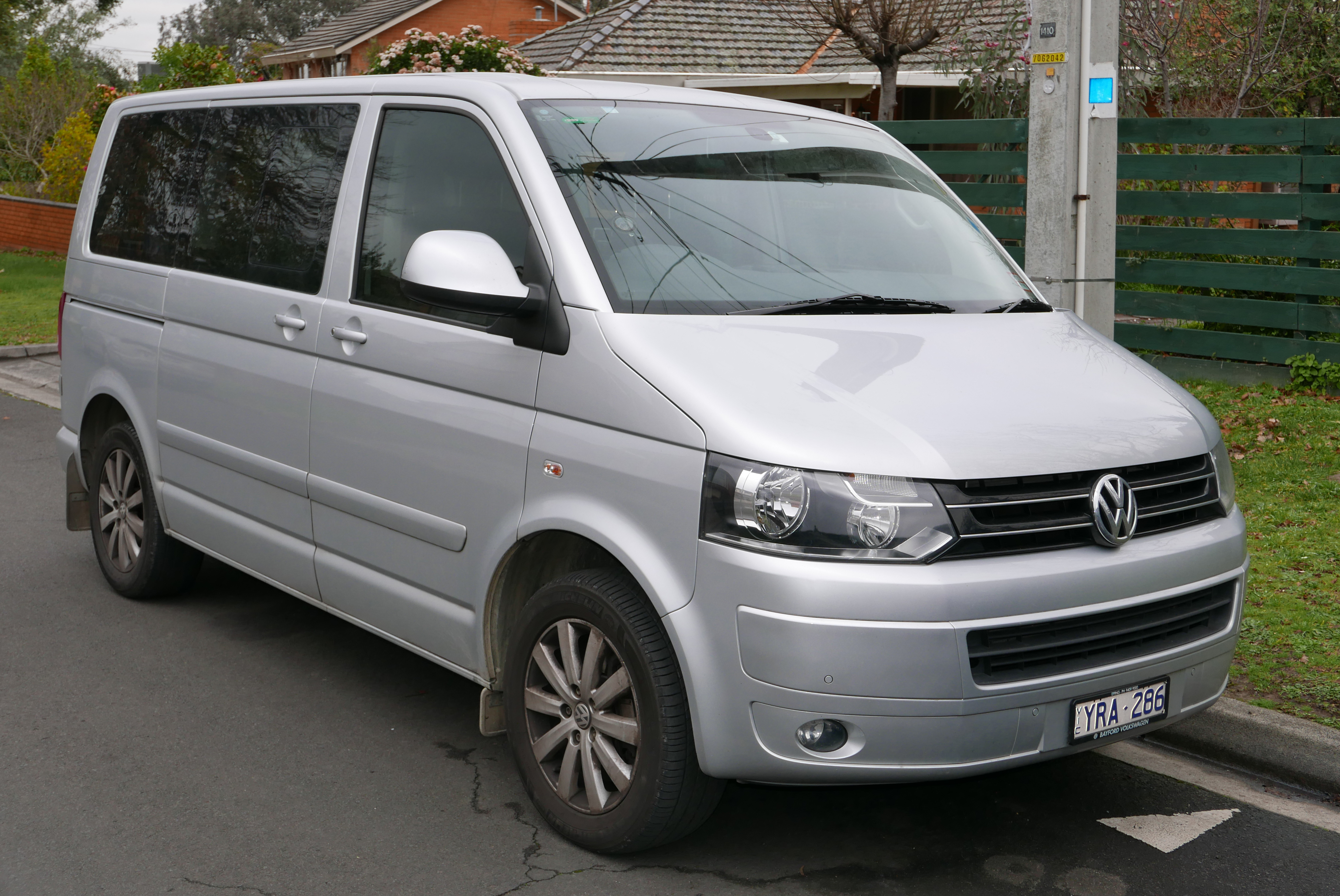
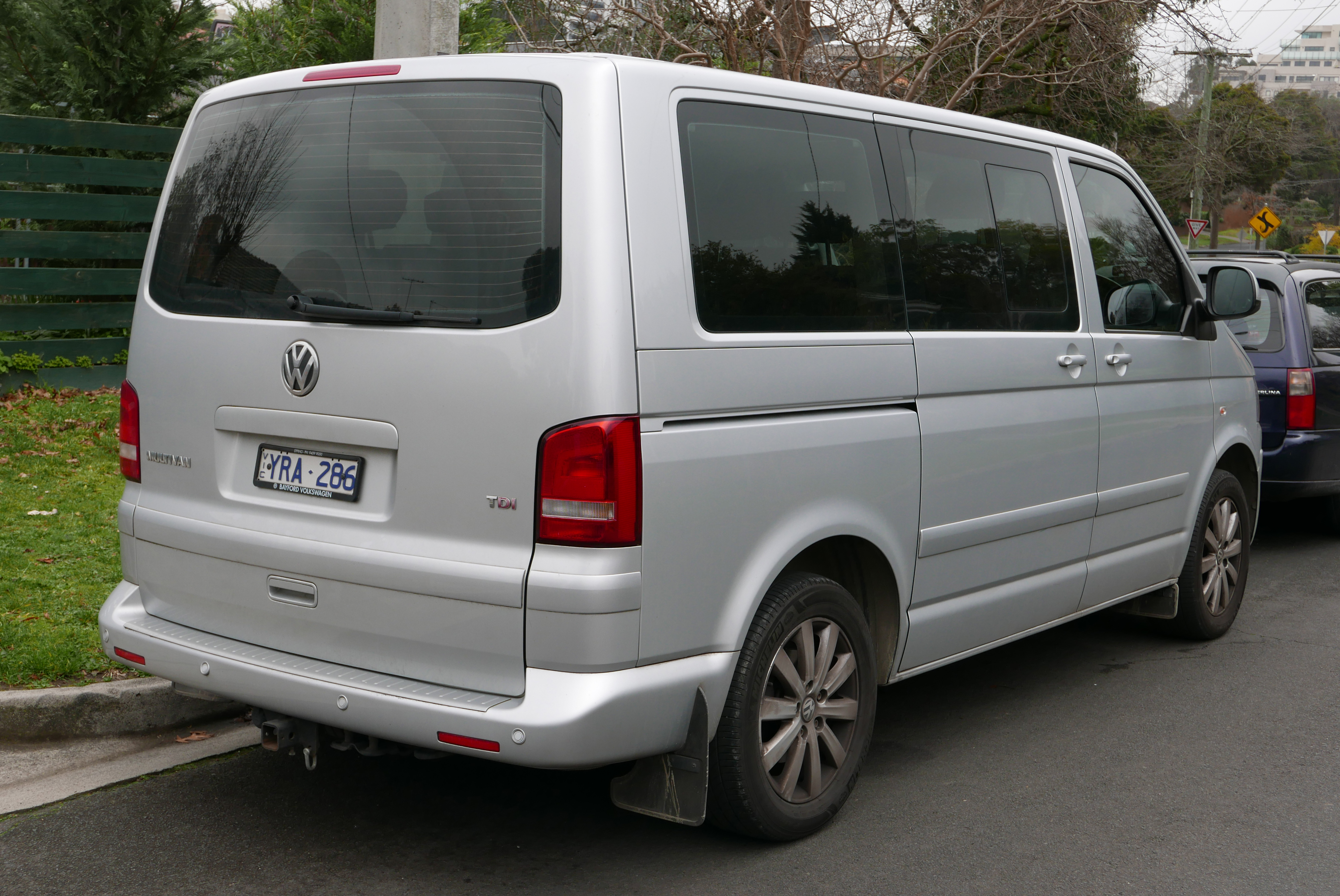
Multivan facelift (2010–2015)

In September 2009, Volkswagen Commercial Vehicles launched a revamped and facelifted T5 range, which is sold under four main labels the Transporter, Caravelle, Multivan and California.

The revised range showcases new technology dealers claimed it was their best earner. The medium van segment, which includes a world-first with the dual clutch transmission named Direct-Shift Gearbox (DSG) – which is also available with 4motion four-wheel drive, Side Lane Assist for monitoring blind spots when changing lanes, tyre pressure monitor display for monitoring tyre pressures (TPMS), Bi-Xenon Head Lights with LED Daytime Running Lights and touchscreen Radio Navigation System (RNS), and a reversing camera that worked in conjunction with RNS.

Engines powering the revised range are now all inline-four-cylinder designs; and all are 2.0 L in cubic capacity which includes one petrol option, and four newly developed high-efficiency Turbocharged Direct Injection (TDI) diesel options, all with common rail, replacing the former Pumpe Düse (PD) Unit Injector fuel system. Volkswagen Commercial Vehicles claim that this new diesel engine range is twenty percent more efficient than the outgoing TDI range.

=== Edition 25 Multivan (2011) ===
It is a version commemorating 25th anniversary of Multivan, covering 2.0L petrol, 2.0L TSI (150 kW), 2.0L TSI 4MOTION (150 kW), 2.0L TDI (75 kW), 2.0L TDI (103 kW), 2.0L TDI 4MOTION (103 kW), 2.0L BiTDI (132 kW), 2.0L BiTDI 4MOTION (132 kW) models. It was limited to 225 models worldwide and includes a matte black roof and black 18-inch alloy wheels, black door handles, matte black paint on the underside of the front bumper, black decal trim at the back and side sills; choice of Candy White, Salsa Red or Metallic Silver body colour; sport chassis and upgraded anti-roll bar.

== Engines ==
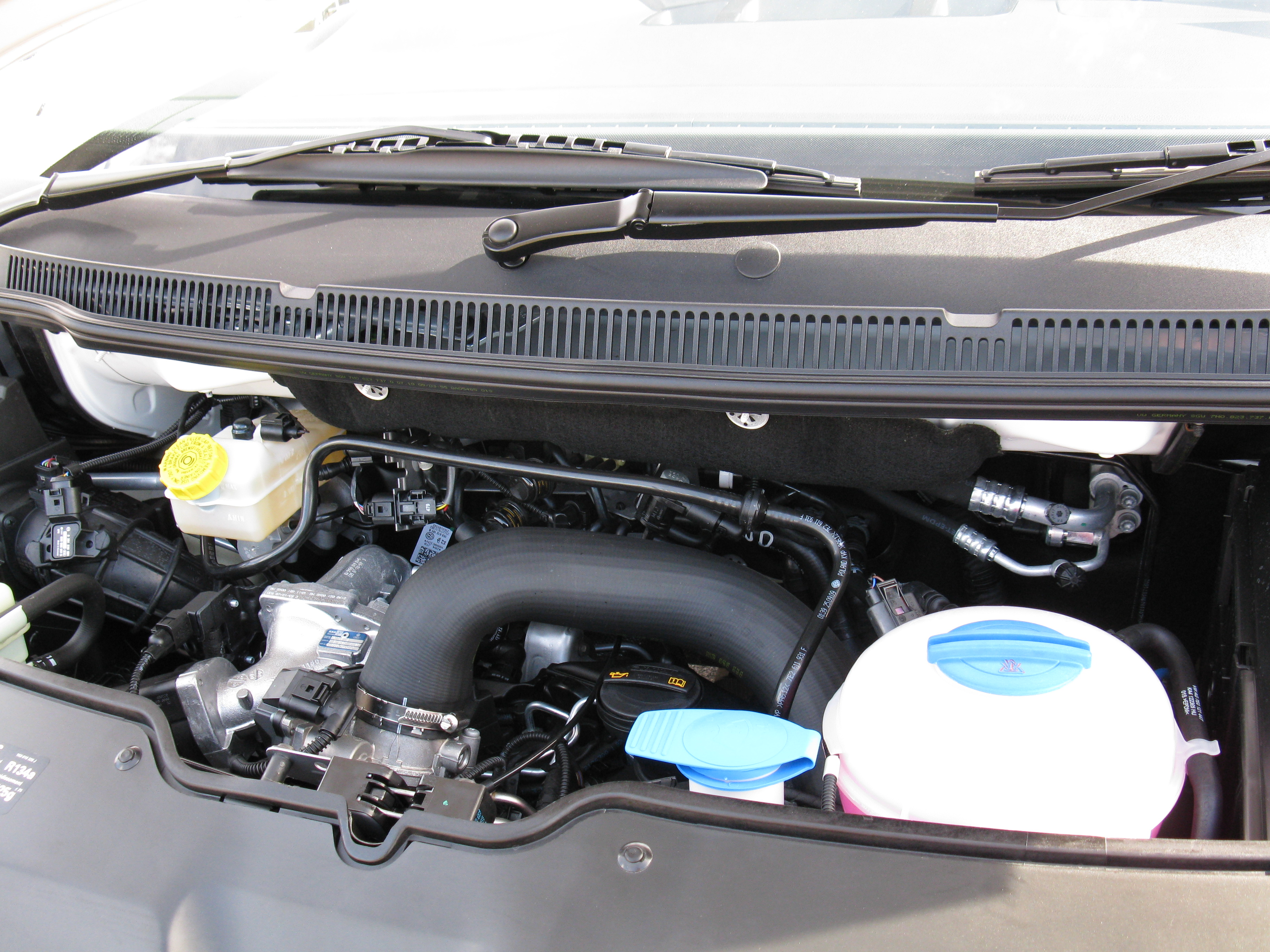
2.0L BiTDI engine for the Transporter

Petrol engines 2003-2009
Model	Code	Engine type	Power	Torque
2.0	AXA	1,984 cc (121 cu in) I 4 N/A	116 PS (85 kW; 114 hp)	170 N⋅m (125 lb⋅ft)
3.2	BDL BKK CFLA	3,189 cc (195 cu in) VR6 N/A	235 PS (173 kW; 232 hp)	315 N⋅m (232 lb⋅ft)
Diesel engines 2003-2009
Model	Code	Engine type	Power	Torque
1.9 TDI PD	AXC BRR	1,896 cc (116 cu in) I4 turbo	84 PS (62 kW; 83 hp)	200 N⋅m (148 lb⋅ft)
1.9 TDI PD	AXB BRS	1,896 cc (116 cu in) I4 turbo	102 PS (75 kW; 101 hp)	250 N⋅m (184 lb⋅ft)
2.5 TDI PD	AXD BNZ	2,461 cc (150 cu in) I5 turbo	131 PS (96 kW; 129 hp)	340 N⋅m (251 lb⋅ft)
2.5 TDI PD	AXE BPC	2,461 cc (150 cu in) I5 turbo	174 PS (128 kW; 172 hp)	400 N⋅m (295 lb⋅ft)
Petrol engines 2010-
Model	Code	Engine type	Power	Torque
2.0	AXA	1,984 cc (121 cu in) I 4 N/A	116 PS (85 kW; 114 hp)	170 N⋅m (125 lb⋅ft)
2.0 TSI	CJKB	1,984 cc (121 cu in) I 4 turbo	149 PS (110 kW; 147 hp)	280 N⋅m (207 lb⋅ft)
2.0 TSI	CJKA	1,984 cc (121 cu in) I 4 turbo	204 PS (150 kW; 201 hp)	350 N⋅m (258 lb⋅ft)
Diesel engines 2010-
Model	Code	Engine type	Power	Torque
2.0 TDI CR	CAAA	1,968 cc (120 cu in) I4 turbo	84 PS (62 kW; 83 hp)	220 N⋅m (162 lb⋅ft)
2.0 TDI CR	CAAB	1,968 cc (120 cu in) I4 turbo	102 PS (75 kW; 101 hp)	250 N⋅m (184 lb⋅ft)
2.0 TDI CRBlueMotion	CAAD	1,968 cc (120 cu in) I4 turbo	114 PS (84 kW; 112 hp)	250 N⋅m (184 lb⋅ft)
2.0 TDI CR	CAAE CCHB	1,968 cc (120 cu in) I4 turbo	136 PS (100 kW; 134 hp)	340 N⋅m (251 lb⋅ft)
2.0 TDI CR	CAAC CCHA	1,968 cc (120 cu in) I4 turbo	140 PS (103 kW; 138 hp)	340 N⋅m (251 lb⋅ft)
2.0 BitTDI CR	CFCA	1,968 cc (120 cu in) I4 Bi-turbo	179 PS (132 kW; 177 hp)	400 N⋅m (295 lb⋅ft)

== Safety ==
ANCAP test results* Volkswagen Transporter van variants (2008)
Test	Score
Overall	4 /5 stars
Frontal offset	10.93/16
Side impact	16/16
Pole	0/2
Seat belt reminders	0/3
Whiplash protection	Not Assessed
Pedestrian protection	Poor
Electronic stability control	Optional

== Awards ==
- The T5 in 2008 was awarded a 4-star crash safety rating from the European New Car Assessment Programme.
- In the United Kingdom, the popular commercial vehicle publication What Van? awarded the T5 range the 2003 What Van? Van of the Year award.
- Fleet Van Awards 2008 – Best Medium Van.
- Automotive TOTAL Excellium MPG Marathon 2008 – Best in Class.
- In 2004, the T5 range won the prestigious International Van of the Year which is voted by the top Editors and Journalists from fleet, van and truck publications.
- In Australia, the T5 has been awarded these awards from the Delivery Magazine publication:
  - Delivery Magazine's Medium Van of the Year for 2005.
  - Delivery Magazine's Medium Van of the Year for 2006.
  - Delivery Magazine's Cab Chassis of the Year for 2006.
  - Delivery Magazine's People Mover of the Year for 2009.
  - In 2009 Carsales.com.au Peoples Choice Light Commercial Van category was won by the T5 range.
- In its home market of Germany, the T5 Series has won numerous awards by respected publications and votes by the public.
- Lastauto Omnibus Van of the Year 2003
- transaktuell Van of the Year 2003
- Auto Motor und Sport – Multivan Best in Class 2005
- Auto Motor und Sport – Multivan Best in Class 2007
- Auto Motor und Sport – Multivan Best in Class 2008
- Auto Zeitung – Auto Trophy for the Multivan in the 'Vans' Class 2006

== Gallery ==
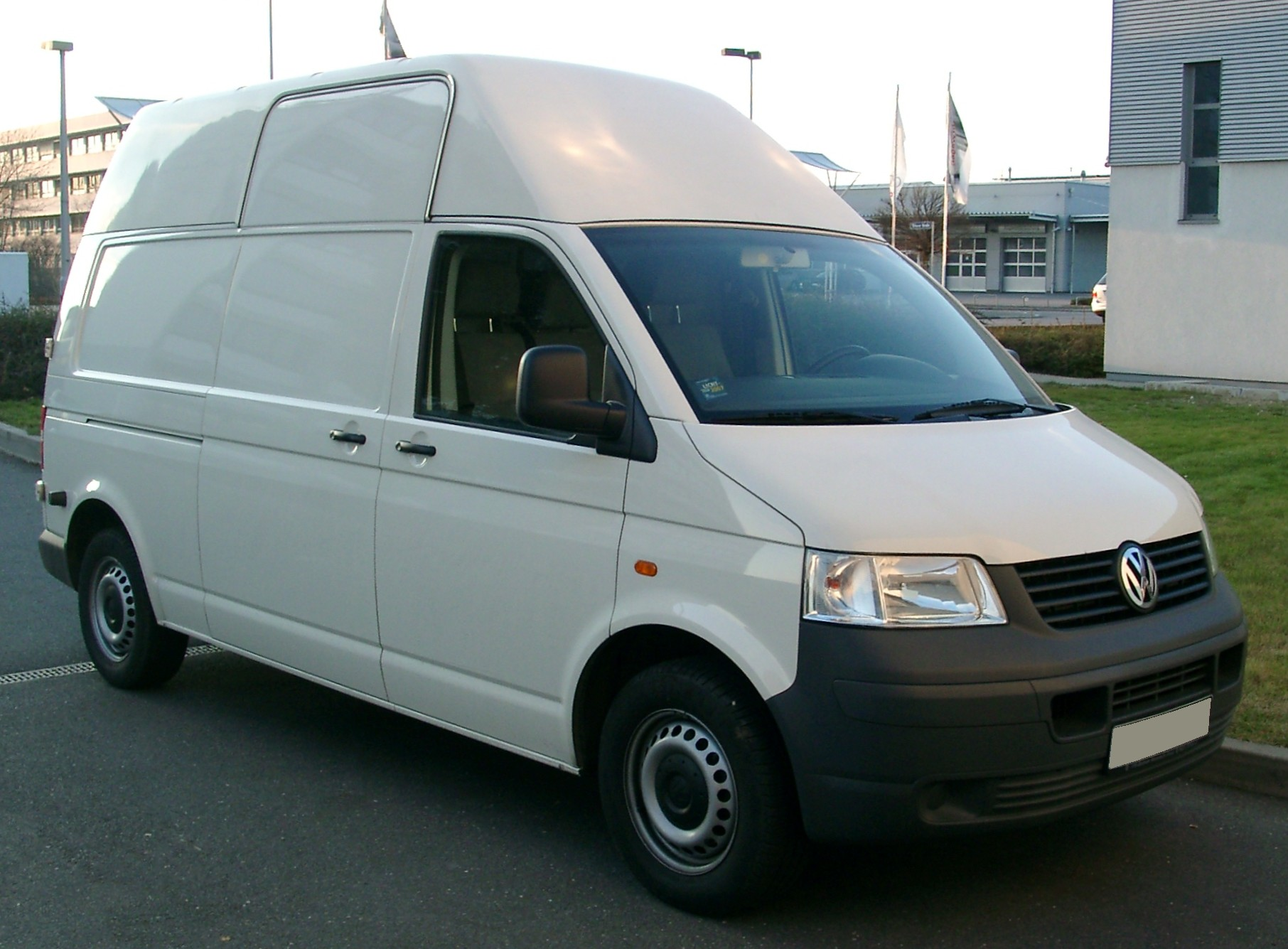
High roof van

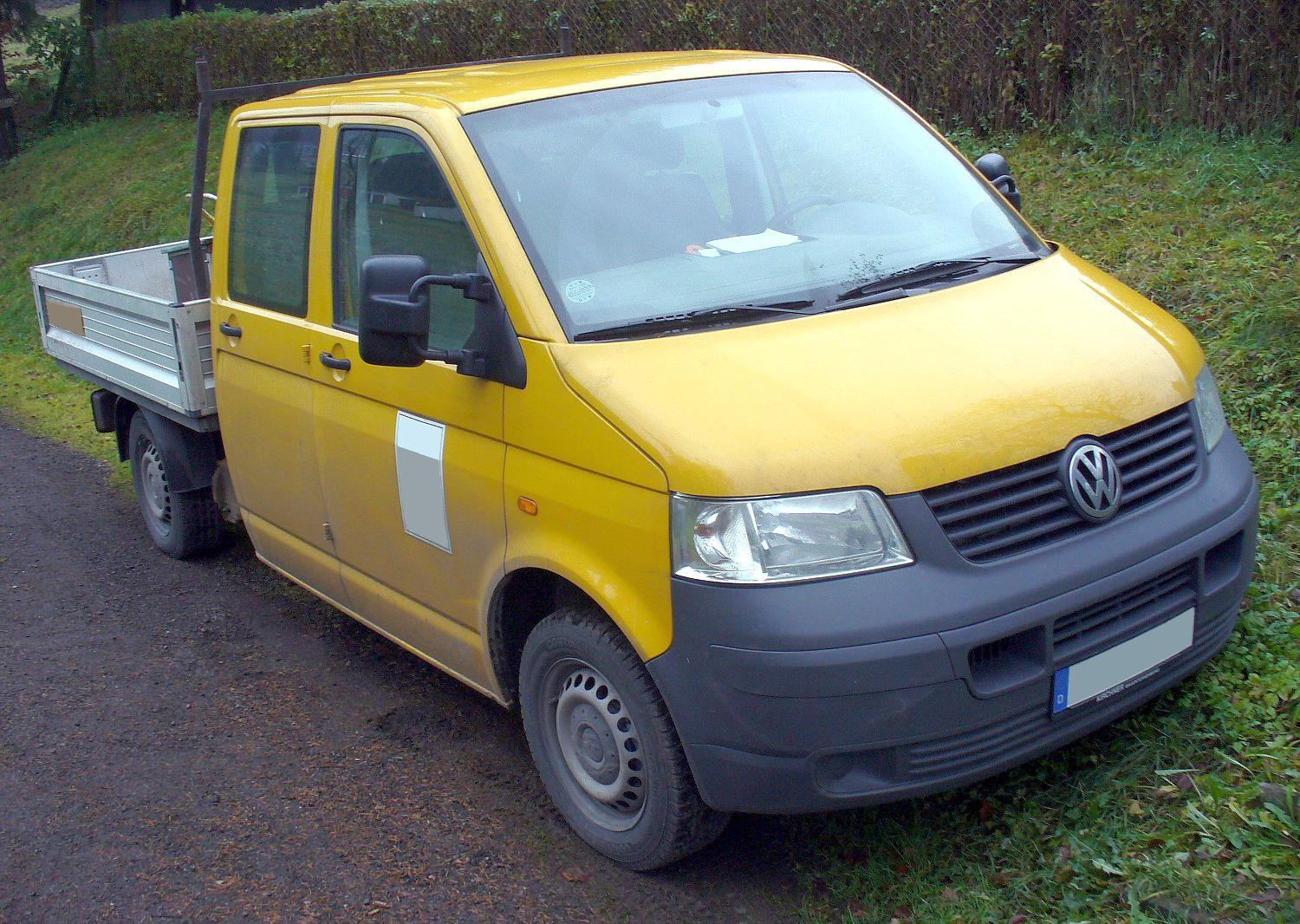
Double cab
