= Toyota Y engine =

Y engine
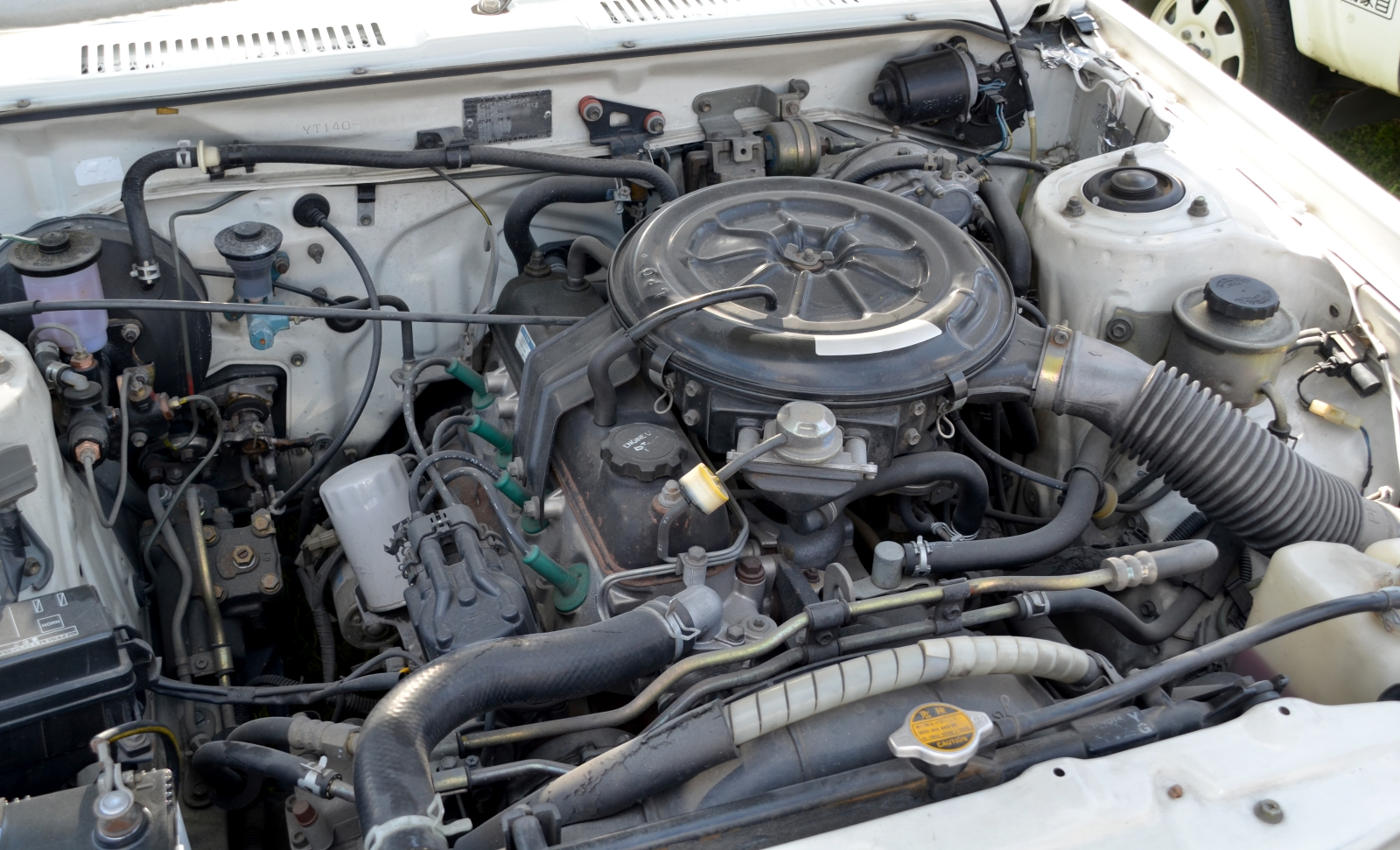

Overview
- Manufacturer: Toyota
- Production: 1982–1996

Layout
- Configuration: Naturally aspirated straight-four
- Valvetrain: OHV 2 valves per cylinder

Combustion
- Fuel system: Carburettor; Multi-port fuel injection
- Fuel type: Petrol
- Oil system: Wet sump
- Cooling system: Water-cooled

Output
- Power output: 70–95 PS (69–94 hp; 51–70 kW) (net)
- Torque output: 135–182 N⋅m (14–19 kg⋅m; 100–134 lb⋅ft) (net)

Chronology
- Successor: Toyota TZ engine

The Toyota Y engine is a series of overhead valve straight-four petrol engines manufactured by Toyota from 1982 through 1996. The Y engine has mostly been used in commercial and off-road vehicles.

The valve arrangement from the Toyota K engine is interchangeable with this engine.

Translated from Japanese Wiki ja:トヨタ・Y型エンジン

== 1Y ==
There is also the 1Y-J, with the "J" suffix meaning that the engine is built to meet emission standards for light commercial vehicles.

- OHV, eight valves
- Displacement: 1.6 L (1,626 cc)
- Bore × stroke: 86 mm × 70 mm (3.39 in × 2.76 in)
- Reference output: 84 PS (62 kW), 13.8 kg⋅m (135 N⋅m; 100 lbf⋅ft) (gross figures, apply to both 1Y and 1Y-J)

Applications:

- Toyota HiAce truck
- Toyota LiteAce (YM20, first generation)
- Toyota ToyoAce
- Toyota TownAce (YR10)

== 2Y ==
The 2Y engine is an OHV, eight valve construction just like the 1Y. It shares that engine's 86 mm (3.39 in) bore, but stroke is increased to 78 mm (3.07 in) for a displacement of 1.8 litres (1,812 cc). There are also 2Y-J and 2Y-U engines with differing emissions control equipment.

- OHV, eight valves
- Displacement: 1.8 L (1,812 cc)
- Bore × stroke: 86 mm × 78 mm (3.39 in × 3.07 in)
- Compression ratio: 8.8:1
- Reference output (2Y): 79 PS (58 kW) at 5,000 rpm, 14.3 kg⋅m (140 N⋅m; 103 lbf⋅ft) at 3,200 rpm (net)
  95 PS (70 kW), 15.5 kg⋅m (152 N⋅m; 112 lbf⋅ft) (gross)

Applications:

- 5th generation Toyota Mark II Van (YX76V, 2Y-J)
- 3rd generation Toyota HiAce van (YH50V/60V)
- Toyota Hilux
- Toyota TownAce van (YR25V)
- Toyota LiteAce wagon (YM20/30G)
- Volkswagen Taro (a rebadged Hilux)

=== 2Y-P ===
- OHV 8 valve (LPG)
- Displacement: 1.8 L (1,812 cc)
- Bore × stroke: 86 mm × 78 mm (3.39 in × 3.07 in)
- Specifications: 70 PS (51 kW) 4,600 rpm 13.5 kg⋅m (132 N⋅m; 98 lbf⋅ft) 2,200 rpm (net)
  85 PS (63 kW) 5,000 rpm 14.5 kg⋅m (142 N⋅m; 105 lbf⋅ft) 3,000 rpm (gross)
- LPG

Applications:

- Toyota Corona (YT140)
- Toyota Mark II (YX70)

== 3Y ==
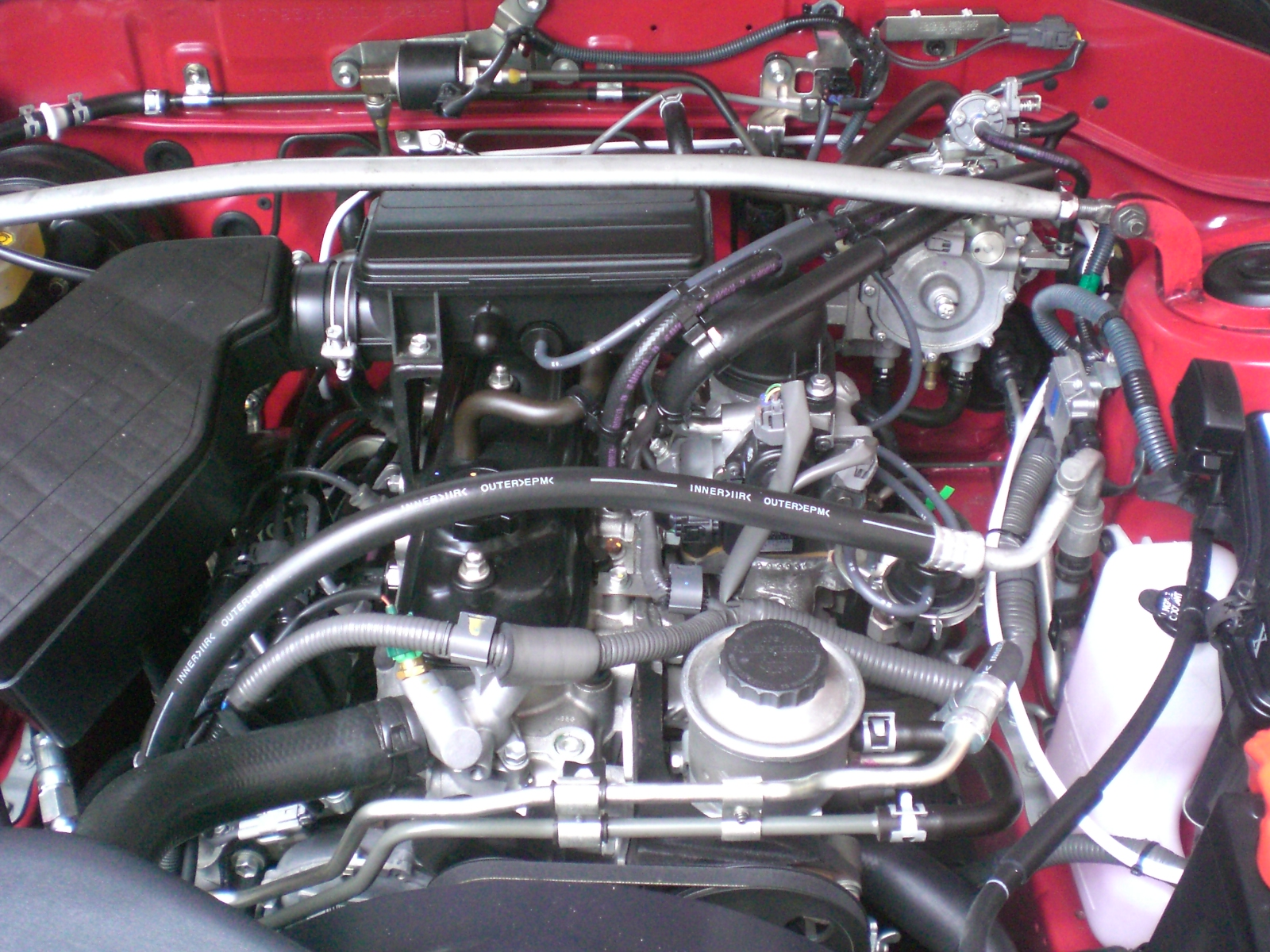
3Y engine in a Toyota Crown Comfort

There is also the emissions cleaned 3Y-U engine. A version of the 3Y is built by the Shenyang Xinguang-Brilliance Automobile Engine Co. in China as the 4G20B; this engine meets the Euro IV emissions standards.

- OHV 8 valve, carburetted
- Displacement: 2.0 L (1,998 cc)
- Bore × stroke: 86 mm × 86 mm (3.39 in × 3.39 in)
- Compression ratio: 8.8:1
- Reference output: 88 PS (65 kW) at 4,800 rpm, 15.8 kg⋅m (155 N⋅m; 114 lbf⋅ft) at 3,400 rpm

Applications:

- 3rd generation Toyota HiAce truck/van/wagon (YH51G/61G/71G)
- Hilux
- Dyna/ToyoAce
- Aug 1983–Aug 1987 Crown (YS120, export models)

=== 3Y-C ===
This is the low emissions carburetted motor with catalytic converter exhaust system.

- OHV 8 valve
- Displacement: 2.0 L (1,998 cc)
- Inside Bore × Stroke: 86 mm × 86 mm (3.39 in × 3.39 in)
- Compression ratio: 8.8:1
- Reference output: 85 PS (63 kW) at 4600 rpm, 15.8 kg⋅m (155 N⋅m; 114 lbf⋅ft) at 3400 rpm

Applications:

- LiteAce XTRA TRACK Wagon (YM40-RGMDSQ), (YM41-RVMDSQ)
- Toyota Townace Van (YR39)

=== 3Y-E ===
- OHV 8 valve, fuel injection
- Displacement: 2.0 L (1,998 cc)
- Bore × stroke: 86 mm × 86 mm (3.39 in × 3.39 in)
- Compression ratio: 8.8:1
- Reference output: 97 PS (71 kW) at 4,800 rpm, 16.3 kg⋅m (160 N⋅m; 118 lbf⋅ft) at 3,800 rpm

Applications:

- Feb 1993–Apr 1997 Toyota Mark II (YX78V, fifth generation)
- Aug 1988–Dec 1995 Mark II (YX80)
- Apr 1989–Aug 1991 Hilux Surf (YN130G)
- Daihatsu Rocky F80, F85 (Australia 1988 model year only)
- 1996 Toyota Classic

=== 3Y-EU ===
- OHV 8 valve, fuel injection and emissions equipment
- Displacement: 2.0 L (1,998 cc)
- Bore × stroke: 86 mm × 86 mm (3.39 in × 3.39 in)
- Reference output: 115 PS (85 kW) at 5000 rpm, 18.3 kg⋅m (179 N⋅m; 132 lbf⋅ft) at 3600 rpm (gross)
  97 PS (71 kW) at 4800 rpm, 16.3 kg⋅m (160 N⋅m; 118 lbf⋅ft) at 3800 rpm (net)

Applications:

- Aug 1986–Mar1989 Hilux Surf/4Runner (YN61G)
- TownAce Wagon/MasterAce Surf (YR21G)
- Daihatsu Delta Wagon (YB21G)

=== 3Y-P ===
- OHV 8 valve (LPG)
- Displacement: 2.0 L (1,998 cc)
- Bore × stroke: 86 mm × 86 mm (3.39 in × 3.39 in)
- Output: 79 PS (58 kW) at 4,600 rpm, 15 kg⋅m (150 N⋅m; 110 lbf⋅ft) at 3,000 rpm

Applications:

- Sep 1987–Aug 1989 Crown Sedan (YS130)
- Aug 1988–Dec 1995 Mark II sedan (YX80)

=== 3Y-PU ===
- OHV 8 valve (LPG, emissions equipment)
- Displacement: 2.0 L (1,998 cc)
- Bore × stroke: 86 mm × 86 mm (3.39 in × 3.39 in)
- Reference output: 90 PS (66 kW) at 5,000 rpm, 16 kg⋅m (160 N⋅m; 120 lbf⋅ft) at 3,000 rpm (gross)
  79 PS (58 kW) at 4,600 rpm, 15 kg⋅m (150 N⋅m; 110 lbf⋅ft) 2,000 rpm (net)

Applications:

- Aug 1983–Aug 1987 Crown (YS120)
- Aug 1986–??? Mark II (YX72/YX78V)

=== 3Y-PE ===
- OHV 8 valve (LPG, fuel injection)
- Displacement: 2.0 L (1,998 cc)
- Bore × stroke: 86 mm × 86 mm (3.39 in × 3.39 in)
- Compression ratio: 10.5:1
- Reference output: 82 PS (60 kW) at 4600 rpm, 16 kg⋅m (160 N⋅m; 120 lbf⋅ft) at 2400 rpm (August 1989 until November 1995)
  79 PS (58 kW) at 4400 rpm, 16.3 kg⋅m (160 N⋅m; 118 lbf⋅ft) at 2400 rpm (1995 December)

Applications:

- Aug 1989–Nov 1999 Crown (YS130)
- Dec 1995–Aug 2008 Comfort (YXS10)
- Dec 1995–Aug 2008 Comfort (YXS11)

== 4Y ==
- OHV eight-valve
- Displacement: 2.2 L (2,237 cc)
- Bore and stroke: 91 mm × 86 mm (3.58 in × 3.39 in)

This engine was available either carburetted (4Y) or fuel injected (4Y-E, called the GW491Q/LJ491Q and also 4G22B for Chinese manufacture). As fitted to a 1989 Daihatsu Delta truck, the carburetted 4Y produces 70 kW (95 PS; 94 hp) at 4400 rpm (SAE net) and 18.6 kg⋅m (182 N⋅m; 135 lbf⋅ft) at 3000 rpm.

Applications

- 1987.09 - 1995.12 Toyota Crown (YS132, overseas specifications)
- Toyota Van (Town Ace overseas specification, Tarago in Australia)
- Hiace third generation (overseas specification)
- 1979-1988 Toyota Stout (YK110)
- Daihatsu Delta
- 1993-1995 Daihatsu Rocky F95
- Toyota Industries forklifts
- Toyota 4Runner (Australia)
- Volkswagen Taro
- 1985–1997 Toyota Hilux fourth and fifth generation
