= Volkswagen Taro =

Pickup truck

Volkswagen Taro (Typ 7A)
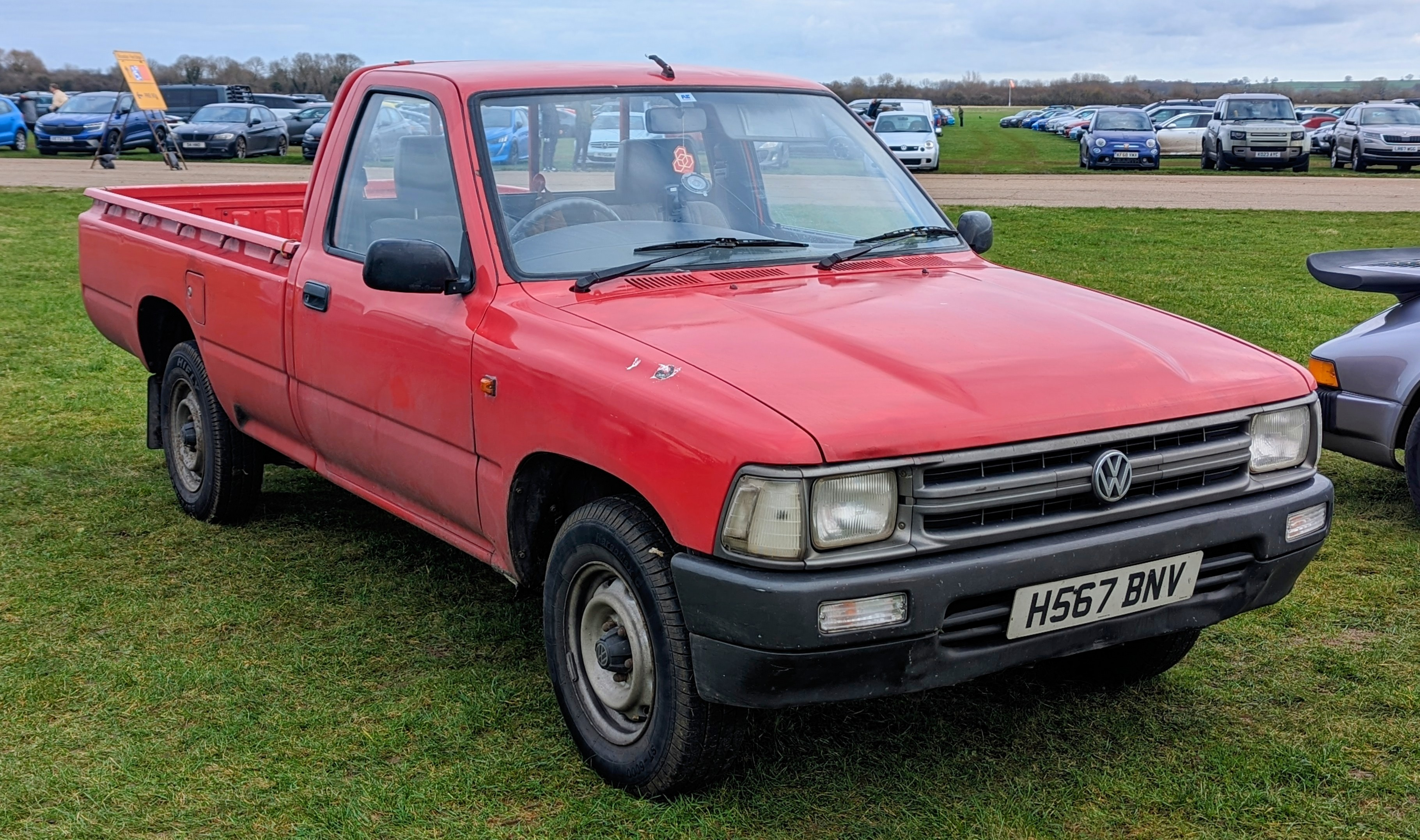
- Volkswagen Taro

Overview
- Manufacturer: Volkswagen Commercial Vehicles; Toyota; Hino
- Also called: Toyota Hilux/Pickup
- Production: February 1989 – March 1997
- Assembly: Japan: Tahara, Aichi; Germany: Hannover

Body and chassis
- Class: Light commercial vehicle
- Body style: Pickup truck
- Layout: Longitudinal front engine; rear-wheel drive (4x2), or four-wheel drive (4x4)

Powertrain
- Engine: Petrol: 1.8 L 2Y I4; 2.2 L 4Y I4; 2.4 L 22R-E I4; Diesel: 2.4 L 2L I4
- Transmission: 5-speed manual

Dimensions
- Wheelbase: 4x2: 2,850 mm (112.2 in); 4x4: 3,095 mm (121.9 in)
- Length: 4x2: 4,725 mm (186.0 in); 4x4: 4,905 mm (193.1 in)
- Width: 4x2: 1,650 mm (65.0 in); 4x4: 1,690 mm (66.5 in)
- Height: 4x2: 1,555 mm (61.2 in); 4x4: 1,740 mm (68.5 in)

Chronology
- Predecessor: Volkswagen Caddy
- Successor: Volkswagen Amarok

The Volkswagen Taro was a compact pickup truck that was introduced in January 1989 by Volkswagen Commercial Vehicles It was a 1 tonne pickup truck to complement the half tonne Caddy pickup / panel van ranges, and the 1 tonne Transporter van and chassis cab ranges. The name "tarō" is a suffix used in Japanese to denote the oldest brother or son, or the first-born son of a family.

The Taro was a project of badge engineering. The Taro was a rebadged fifth generation Toyota Hilux, which was fully engineered and designed by Toyota. The two companies came together in an effort to solve each other's problems:

- Volkswagen Group at the time did not have a one-tonne pickup truck.
- Toyota wanted a bigger European market share of the one-tonne utility market.

== History ==
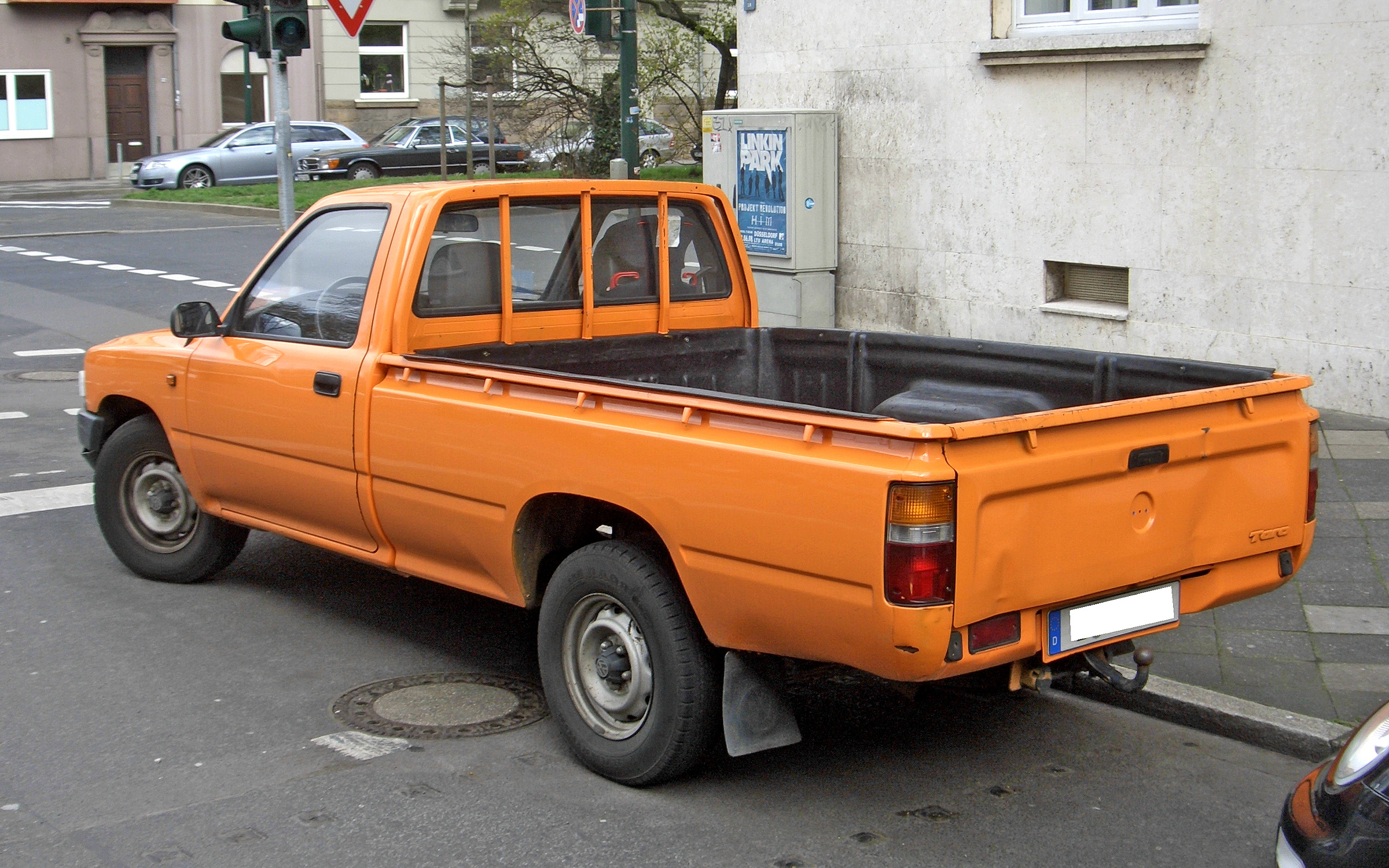
Volkswagen Taro rear

In the late 1980s, Volkswagen Group and Toyota signed an agreement that Volkswagen Commercial Vehicles would assemble the Toyota Hilux at its VWCV factory in Hanover, Germany, and it would be sold under the Volkswagen Taro moniker.

The first Taros manufactured in Hanover, Germany, from 1989-1994 had a 2.4-litre diesel engine with 61 kW (83 PS; 82 bhp), torque was 165 N⋅m (122 lbf⋅ft) at 2,400 rpm, with loading space of 3.4 square metres (37 sq ft) and a 1,125 kg (2,480 lb) payload. The Hanover plant only built the Taro with two-wheel drive and a regular cab, although the "Volkswagen Taro" name was used for other versions imported from Japan in some European markets.

In September 1994 at the IAA Nutfahrzeuge (Commercial Vehicle Fair) in Hanover, Germany, Volkswagen released the four-wheel drive version of the Taro which had an extended cabin. The 4x4 Extended Cab Taro was manufactured in Toyota's Tahara plant in Japan, but now the Taro had an updated 2.4-litre diesel engine which produced 58 kW (79 PS; 78 bhp) at 4,000 rpm and torque of 163 N⋅m (120 lbf⋅ft) at 2,400 rpm. The 4x4 Taro had a 2.9 square metres (31 sq ft) loading space and 815 kg (1,797 lb) payload, but could tow 750 kg (1,653 lb) without brakes, and 2,100 kg (4,630 lb) with brakes.

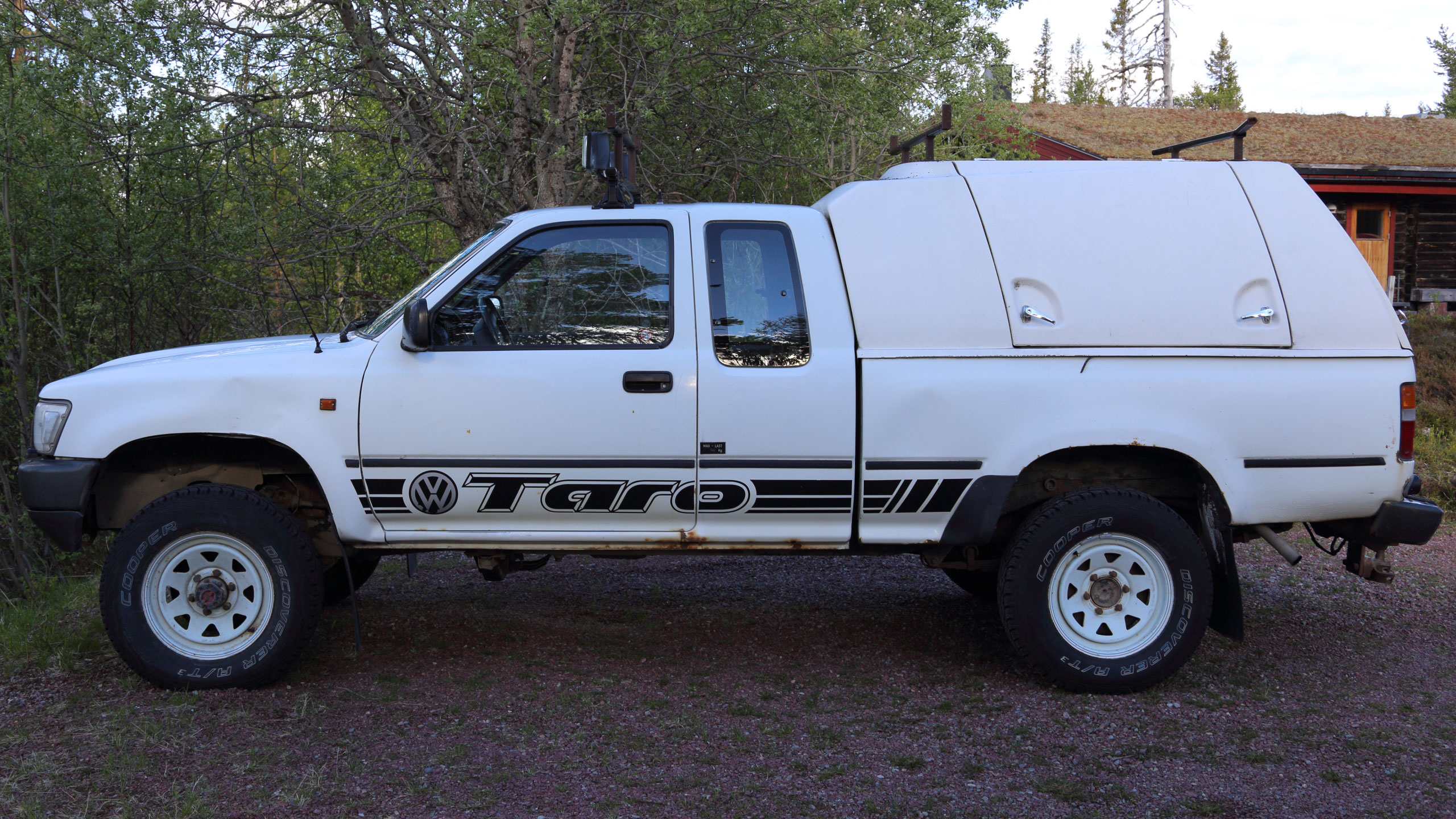
Side view of a 4x4 Extended Cab Taro

The joint venture ended in 1997, due to sales failing to meet either car marque's expectations.

In the 1990s, Volkswagen Brazil built a pick-up truck prototype of the Volkswagen Santana using the bed of the Volkswagen Taro but it did not enter-production.

== Specifications ==
engine ID code, displacement, configuration and rated power output
2Y: 1.8-litre inline four OHV petrol engine with carburettor, 61 kW (83 PS; 82 bhp) at 4,800 rpm
4Y: 2.2-litre inline four OHV petrol engine with carburettor, 68 kW (92 PS; 91 bhp) at 4,400 rpm
2L: 2.4-litre inline four indirect injection SOHC diesel engine, 60–61 kW (82–83 PS; 81–82 bhp) at 4,200 rpm, 165 N⋅m (122 lb⋅ft) at 2,400 rpm

Later models produce 58 kW (79 PS; 78 bhp) at 4,000 rpm, 163 N⋅m (120 lb⋅ft) at 2,400 rpm

22R-E: 2.4-litre inline four SOHC petrol engine with Bosch L-Jetronic injection, 84 kW (114 PS; 112 bhp)
driveline
4x2 = RWD, 4x4 = 4WD
loading area

- Single Cab: 3.0 m^{2} (32.8 sq ft)
- Double Cab: 2.1 m^{2} (22.2 sq ft)

track width - front
(4x2) 1,355 mm (53.3 in), (4x4) 1,430 mm (56.3 in)
track width - rear
(4x2) 1,370 mm (53.9 in), (4x4) 1,425 mm (56.1 in)
turning circle
(4x2) 12.6 m (41.3 ft), (4x4) 14.0 m (45.9 ft)
permissible total weight

- (4x2 petrol) 2,305 kg (5,082 lb)
- (4x2 diesel) 2,395 kg (5,280 lb)
- (4x4 diesel) 2,460 kg (5,423 lb)

payload
(4x2) 995 kg (2,194 lb), (4x4) 815 kg (1,797 lb)
trailer weight braked
(4x2) 1,800 kg (3,968 lb), (4x4) 2,100 kg (4,630 lb)
trailer weight unbraked
750 kg (1,653 lb)
maximum speed km/h
(4x2) 145 km/h (90 mph), (4x4) 130 km/h (81 mph)
acceleration - 0-80 km/h (50 mph)
(4x2) 15.0 seconds, (4x4) 17.0 seconds
fuel consumption
(4x2) 9.6 L/100 km (29 mpg_{‑imp}; 25 mpg_{‑US}), (4x4) 10.2 L/100 km (28 mpg_{‑imp}; 23 mpg_{‑US})

Specifications source

== Successor ==
Starting in 2010, Volkswagen Commercial Vehicles began selling the Volkswagen Amarok pick-up, which competes against the Nissan Navara and Toyota Hilux. The Amarok is available in single and double cab versions, as well as the option of 2WD or 4WD and high torque diesels.
