= Volkswagen Commercial Vehicles =

German marque of light commercial vehicles owned by Volkswagen Group

- Native name: Volkswagen Nutzfahrzeuge
- Type: Division, brand
- Industry: Automotive
- Predecessor: Volkswagen Passenger Cars commercial vehicle operation
- Founded: 1995; 31 years ago
- Headquarters: Hanover, Germany
- Area served: Worldwide
- Key people: Stefan Mecha (CEO)
- Products: Light commercial vehicles
- Number of employees: 19,400 (2006)
- Parent: Volkswagen Group
- Website: www.volkswagen-commercial-vehicles.com

Volkswagen Commercial Vehicles (VWCV; German: Volkswagen Nutzfahrzeuge [ˈfɔlksˌvaːɡn̩ ˈnʊtsˌfaːɐ̯tsɔʏɡə], abbreviated VWN [ˌfaʊveːˈʔɛn]) is a German marque of light commercial vehicles, owned by Volkswagen Group. It is headquartered in Hannover, Lower Saxony, Germany. Originally part of Volkswagen Passenger Cars (business area), it has operated as a separate marque since 1995.

== Organizational structure ==
Volkswagen Commercial Vehicles is a marque, not a legal entity. Its activities are within Volkswagen's Commercial Vehicles Business Area, which also includes the activities of the Scania and MAN marques. The Scania and MAN marques are managed by Traton. Accordingly, Volkswagen Commercial Vehicles is an associate partner of Traton.

== History ==
=== 1947 to 1960 ===
In 1947, Volkswagen Dutch importer Ben Pon sketched a van based on Beetle components which became the legendary Type 2 Transporter range after seeing the Volkswagen Beetle-based Plattenwagen. In 1949, Volkswagen General Director Heinrich Nordhoff approved Ben Pon's sketch for production. In 1949, the first prototype was unveiled in Wolfsburg christened "Bulli"; on November 12 the production of Bulli was launched officially to the public. In 1950, full production began, and Bulli was renamed Type 2 Transporter due to "Bulli" being trademarked by another company. In 1954, Volkswagen celebrated production of 100,000th Type 2 Transporter at the Wolfsburg plant. In 1956, the first Type 2 Transporter rolled off the Hanover plant.

=== 1960 to 1980 ===
In 1962, the 1,000,000th Transporter left the production line in Hanover. In 1967, the second-generation Type 2 Transporter (T2) was released. In 1968, the 2,000,000th Transporter left the production line in Hanover. In 1975, the first generation of the "LastenTransporter" LT was released which opened the door to Volkswagen in the light truck sector. In 1977, the 4.5 millionth Transporter was produced. In 1978, a six cylinder diesel engine was introduced for the LT range in August expanding the range with the LT 40 and LT 45. In 1979, the third-generation Type 2 Transporter (T3) was released.

=== 1980 to 1990 ===
In 1980, a diesel engine was added to the Type 2 Transporter (T3) range. In 1981, Hanover celebrated 25 years of producing the Transporter range. In March, the 5 millionth unit was produced. Also in 1981, Volkswagen Caminhoes Ltd started building medium-sized trucks in Brazil. In 1982, Watercooled petrol engines (wasserboxer) were added to the German Transporter (T3) range. The Caddy Ute, which was based on the Golf, was launched to the public. In 1983, the luxurious Caravelle MPV was launched into the T3 range. In 1985, VWCV launched the four-wheel drive syncro Transporter T3. Volkswagenwerk GmbH also changed its name to VOLKSWAGEN AG. In 1986, the 6 millionth Transporter was produced. In 1987, the Volkswagen California motorhome was introduced into the range. In 1989, the first Volkswagen Taro left the Hanover assembly lines.

=== 1990 to 2000 ===
In 1990, the fourth-generation Transporter/Multivan (T4) was released and VWCV celebrated 40 years of the Transporter, with 6 million produced since its 1950 introduction. In 1992, a joint venture with Ching Chung Motor Co. Ltd. was founded in Taipei, Taiwan. At that time, Volkswagen AG had 1/3 capital in the company, and from 1993 the T4 Transporter was produced there. In 1994, the 500,000th Transporter/Multivan (T4) left the production line in Hanover. Also in 1994, the Volkswagen L80 was launched onto the German market. In 1995, Dr. Bernd Wiedemann, Chairman of the Management of Volkswagen Commercial Vehicles, announced the formation of Volkswagen Commercial Vehicles as an independent Volkswagen Group marque. In 1996, the Type 9K Caddy Panel Van and Type 9U Caddy were released on the market. The Volkswagen Commercial Vehicles and Mercedes-Benz commercial vehicle unit launched a joint venture to replace their aging large vans, and the jointly developed Volkswagen LT and Mercedes-Benz Sprinter were launched onto the market with success.

=== 2000 to 2010 ===
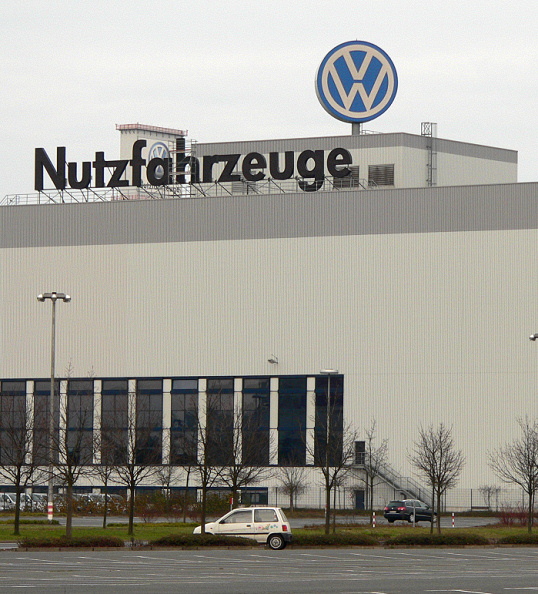
The Volkswagen Commercial Vehicles assembly plant in Hannover, Germany

In 2000, VWCV celebrated 50 years of building the legendary Transporter/Multivan (T4) range. VWCV also took charge of the Volkswagen Trucks and Buses operation. In 2003, the fifth generation T5 Transporter and passenger-oriented Caravelle / Multivan MPV were released. In 2004, the T5 Transporter range won UK's What Van? "Van of the Year Award", and the all new Type 2K Caddy was released, with the Caddy now having Golf Mk5 front suspension. In 2005, the 7-seat passenger-oriented Caddy Life was released. In 2006, the replacement to the Volkswagen LT, the Volkswagen Crafter, was revealed; this time it was built alongside its joint venture twin the Mercedes-Benz Sprinter at the Mercedes-Benz factory in Ludwigsfelde, Germany. Also in 2006, the Volkswagen Crafter and Mercedes-Benz Sprinter won the What Van? "Van of the Year Award" and What Van? "Large Panel Van of the Year", along with VWCV winning the What Van? "Technology Award" for its DSG transmission in the Caddy van. In 2007, Stephan Schaller replaced Dr. Bernd Wiedemann as the Volkswagen Commercial Vehicle Managing Director, and the LWB Caddy called Caddy Maxi was released. Also in 2007, the Caddy and Volkswagen Crafter won Professional Van and Light Truck Magazine's Small and Large Van of the Year Awards. In November 2007, Volkswagen Commercial Vehicles built their 10 millionth Transporter. In 2008, Volkswagen AG sold Volkswagen Caminhões e Ônibus to MAN SE. At the IAA in Hanover, Volkswagen Commercial Vehicles revealed various new models including the new fourth global line in the guise of a Concept Pickup, Caddy 4Motion, Caddy PanAmericana Study and Crafter BlueMotion Study. Volkswagen Commercial Vehicles UK revealed the Caddy Sportline range. In 2009, Volkswagen Commercial Vehicles operations in Brazil revealed the new fifth-generation Saveiro utility for emerging markets. VWCV revealed at IAA Frankfurt the T5 Transporter facelift which included new engines and technology to benefit the class. In December 2009, Volkswagen Amarok was launched at an event in General Pacheco, Argentina, with the President of Argentina, Cristina Kirchner, attending. Following the Launch in Argentina, Volkswagen Amarok was a key support vehicle in the 2010 Dakar Rally with 45 vehicles participating. Lastly in 2009, Volkswagen Commercial Vehicles established its Latin American offices in Miami, Florida, to cater to the Central and South Americas region.

=== 2010 to present ===
In February 2010, Wolfgang Schreiber was appointed the new chief of Volkswagen Commercial Vehicles, but the title was renamed Speaker of the Board of Management of Volkswagen Commercial Vehicles. In September 2010, Volkswagen Commercial Vehicles revealed the Transporter Rockton with 4Motion, an AWD van for tough situations and marketed towards emergency services in tough climates. Also in 2010, Volkswagen Commercial Vehicles revealed the Amarok SingleCab study at IAA in Hanover, VWVC revealed Multivan Edition25 for the 25th Anniversary of the Multivan nameplate, and VWVC revealed the Transporter with BlueMotion Technology. In April 2011, Volkswagen Commercial Vehicles released a revised Crafter with three new redesigned TDI engines, and Volkswagen Commercial Vehicles showed their electric Caddy prototype at the Hanover Trade Fair. In September 2011, Volkswagen Commercial Vehicles released the Caddy Edition30 for the 30th Anniversary of the nameplate. Volkswagen Commercial Vehicles also revealed the Amarok with 8 speed transmission and a new 132 kW/180os engine with 420 Nm and a towing capacity of 3.2 tonnes. In November 2011, Volkswagen Commercial Vehicles released the ultra luxurious Multivan Business. In December 2011, Volkswagen Commercial Vehicles scooped three What Van? awards for Amarok 'Pickup of the Year', Caddy 4Motion '4x4 Van of the Year' and Transporter Sportline 'Editors Choice'. In January 2012, Volkswagen Commercial Vehicles released BlueMotion versions of the Volkswagen Transporter and Volkswagen Crafter, with both vehicles having improved fuel consumption thanks to BlueMotion Technologies. In June 2012, Volkswagen Commercial Vehicles' small van, the Caddy, became available with Park Assist. In August 2012, Volkswagen Commercial Vehicles started production of the Amarok in Hannover. In September 2012, Dr. Eckhard Scholz was appointed Speaker for the Board of Management of Volkswagen Commercial Vehicles. In September 2016, Volkswagen Commercial Vehicles released the new version of the Crafter, in the newly built factory in Września, Poland. The cost of the new plant was about 800 million EUR.

== MAN / Volkswagen joint venture 1977–1993 ==
Volkswagen's first joint venture into trucks outside of their own LT range was with MAN Nutzfahrzeuge (Commercial Vehicles) from 1977 to 1993. Truck production started in 1979 and ended in 1993 with 72,000 units produced. It was available with four engines and four wheelbases over its lifetime; there was also a 4X4 version called 8.150 FAE. FAE means "forward control" cab, all-wheel drive, single tyres so the F nomenclature means "forward control" cab. This series is usually referred to as the G90, from the most common model, but also as the "G"-series. In the United Kingdom it was originally marketed as the "MAN MT" series. The original lineup in the UK consisted of the 6.90 and the 8.90 (the first digit denoting the GVW in tonnes, the second for power in metric horsepower) and the 8.136 and 9.136.

MAN AG supplied engines which were available in inline-four and inline-six cylinder engine configurations, with DIN rated motive power outputs of:

- 67 kilowatts (91 PS; 90 bhp)
- 75 kilowatts (102 PS; 101 bhp)
- 101 kilowatts (137 PS; 135 bhp)
- 112 kilowatts (152 PS; 150 bhp)

MAN AG replaced the G series (as it was known internally) with the L2000 and M2000 ranges.

VWCV and MAN shared the project development in accordance with the collaboration agreement as follows:

Volkswagen Commercial Vehicles took care of:

- the tilting driver's cab including steering wheel and fixing, hand levers and foot pedals

the VW LT Mk 1 cabin was used for the MAN-VW range, the cabins are wider than the standard LT cabins so they can fit the truck chassis

- the complete interior equipment and heating
- the manual gearbox with clutch and gear lever, the rear axle with rear-axle transmission and suspension
- the cardan shafts including bearings
- the electrical system for the entire concept, and the platforms for the standard design

MAN was responsible for:

- the engine including cooling, exhaust, inlet and fuel system
- the front axle with suspension and steering
- the frame with all parts for attaching the springs and axles, the steering, the batteries, the power braking system and fuel system
- the brakes, i.e. for the complete wheel brakes front and rear, the dual-circuit power brakes and parking brake
- the wheels and tyres
- the platform for special designs and tipping mechanism

MAN-VWCVs were built in Volkswagen's Hanover factory until other Volkswagen models took priority; they were then made at MAN AG's Salzgitter-Watenstedt factory.

MAN-VWCV range 6.90, 8.90, 6.100, 8.136, 8.100, 8.150, 9.136, 9.150 and 10.136. "F" and "FAE" are sometimes on the end of some of these model numbers.

Several models of the MAN-VWCV and the VWCV LT ranges were marketed in Spain by Enasa as Pegaso Ekus, in a typical badge engineering operation. Peterbilt also offered this model with their badging, as the 200 or 265 model.

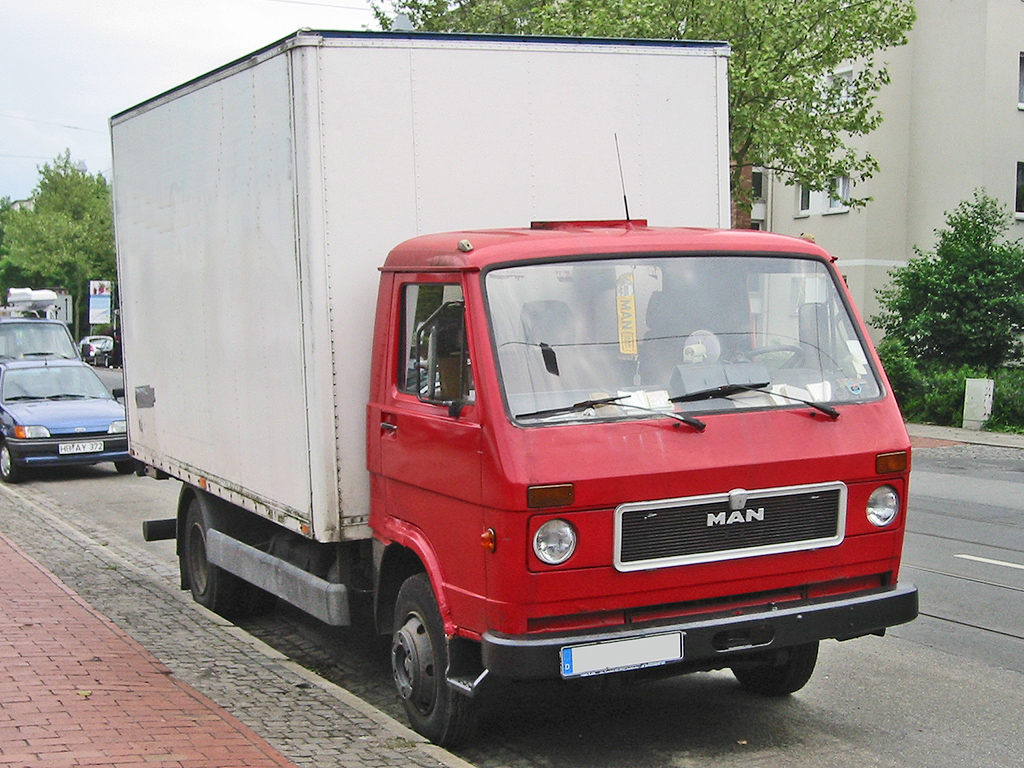
MAN-VW 8.136 truck 1979–1987

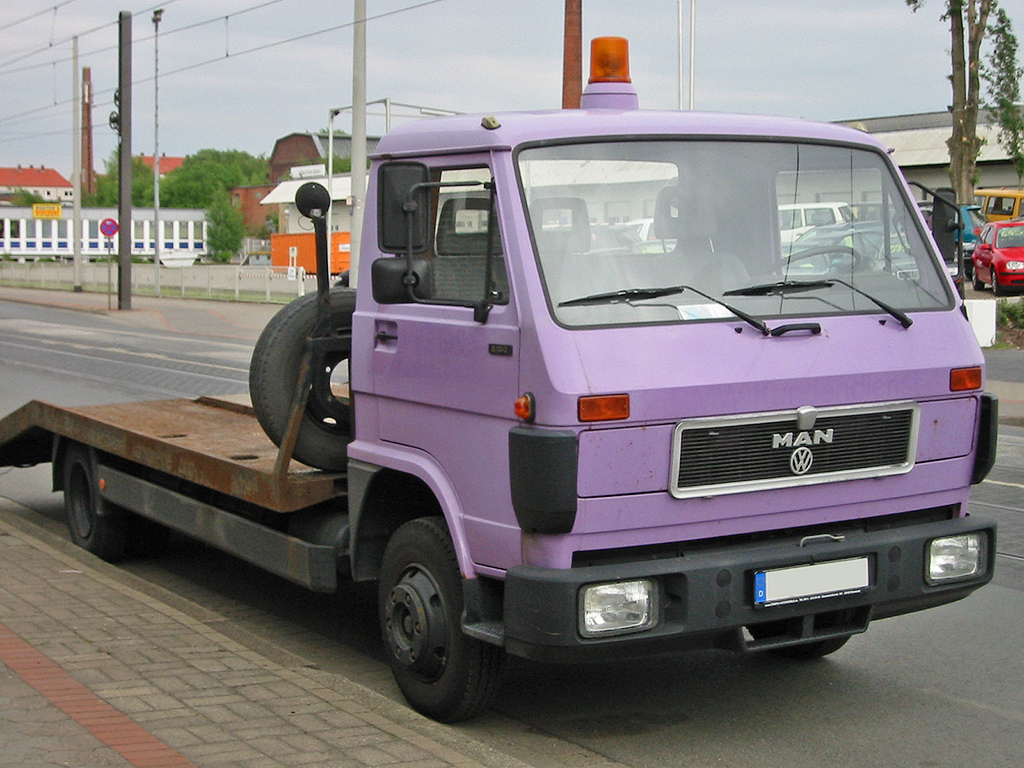
MAN-VW 8.150 truck 1987–1993

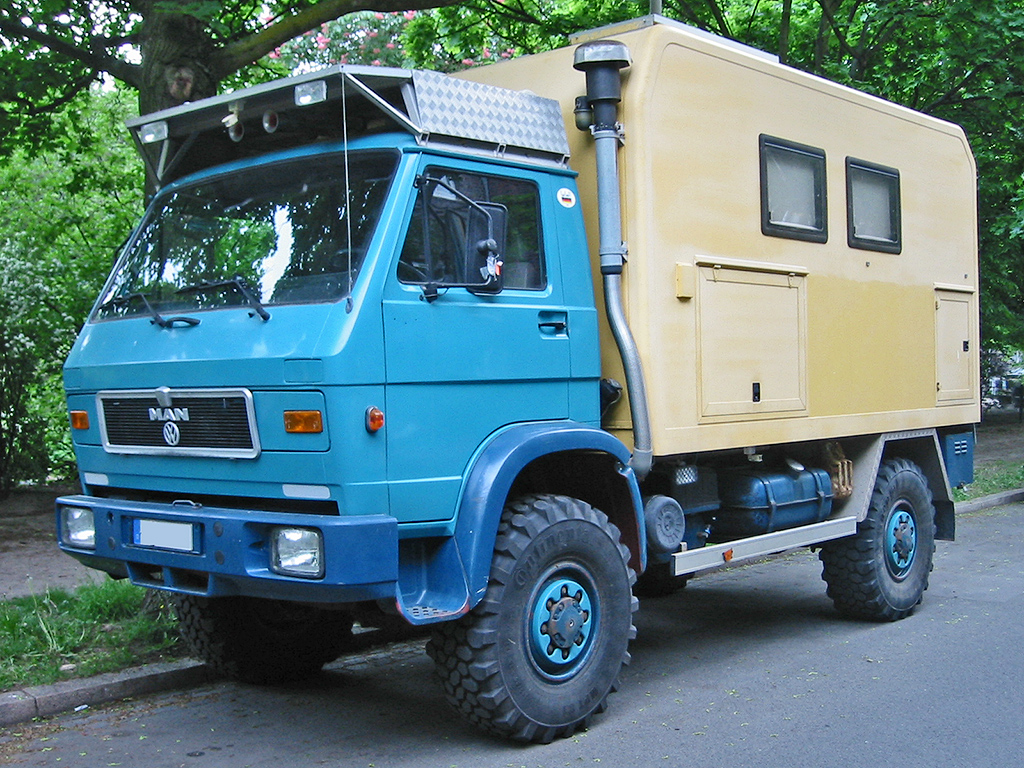
MAN-VW 8.136 FAE 4x4 truck 1987–1993

== Products ==
=== Current ===
==== Car-derived ====
- Volkswagen Caddy
- Volkswagen Saveiro

==== Vans ====
- Volkswagen Transporter
- Volkswagen Caravelle
- Volkswagen California
- Volkswagen Crafter
- Volkswagen Multivan
- Volkswagen ID. Buzz

==== Campervans ====
- Volkswagen Caddy California
- Volkswagen California
- Volkswagen Grand California

==== Pickup trucks ====
- Volkswagen Amarok

=== Discontinued ===
- Volkswagen LT

=== Unique Volkswagen Commercial Vehicles ===
Volkswagen Commercial Vehicles have manufactured some unique commercial vehicles in its 50 plus years of producing light commercial vehicles. One of them was a small postal van which was built at the request of the German Postal Services. By 1964 the Type 147 or Kleinlieferwagen was in production. In popular culture it has also been christened the nickname of Fridolin.

From 1975 to 1979, Volkswagen Commercial Vehicles produced for developing countries a small air-cooled FWD truck called the Volkswagen EA489 Basistransporter, with a rudimentary chassis and basic metal sheeting. It was easily manufactured from semi knocked down kits into a light truck.

In 1989 Volkswagen Commercial Vehicles partnered with Japanese firm Toyota to build the Toyota Hilux pick-up truck rebadged as a Volkswagen Taro. This partnership was to help Toyota build sales in Europe and give VW a vehicle in the 1 tonne pick-up segment. The venture was not a huge success and it split in the late 1990s.

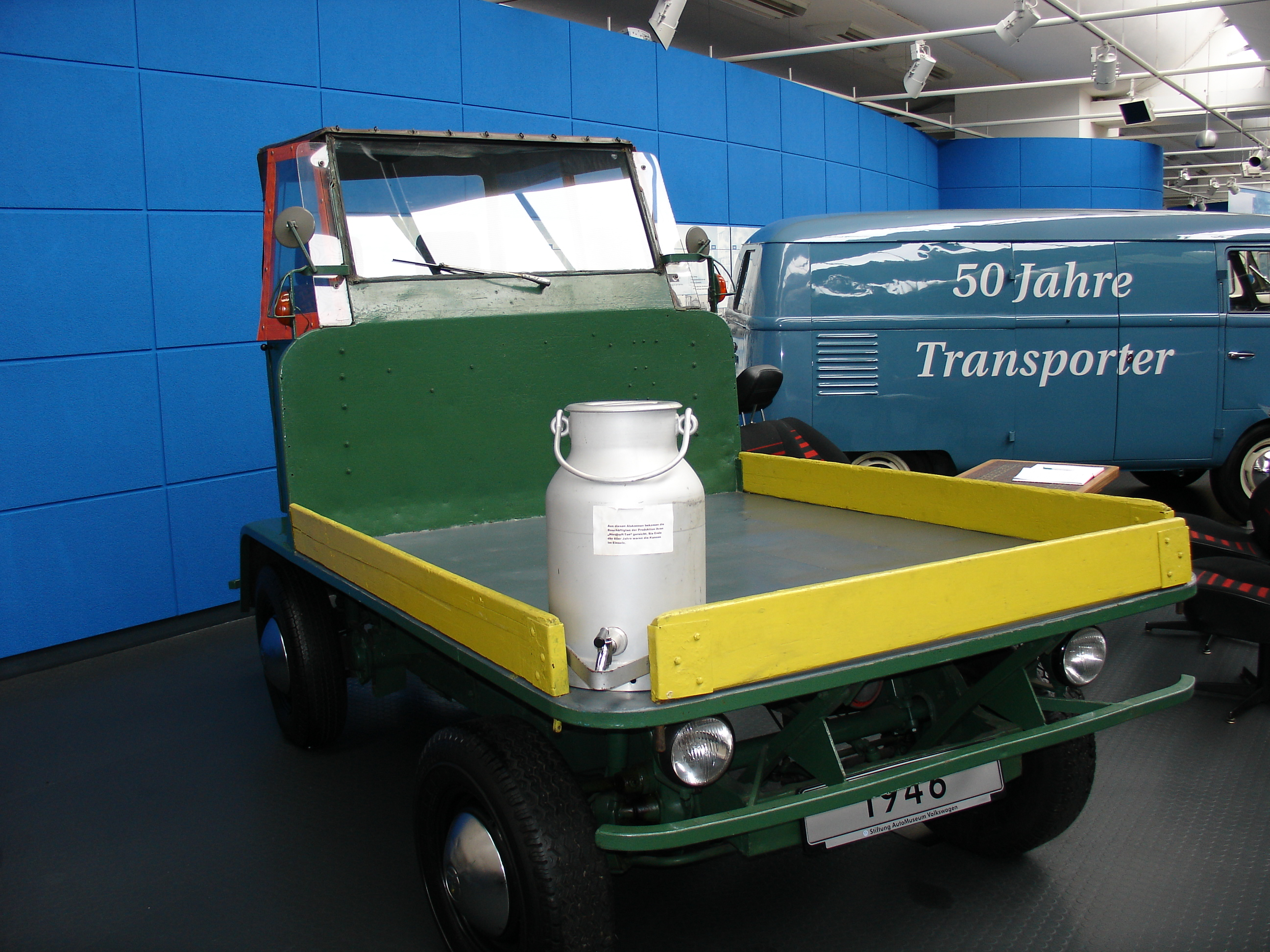
1947 Plattenwagen

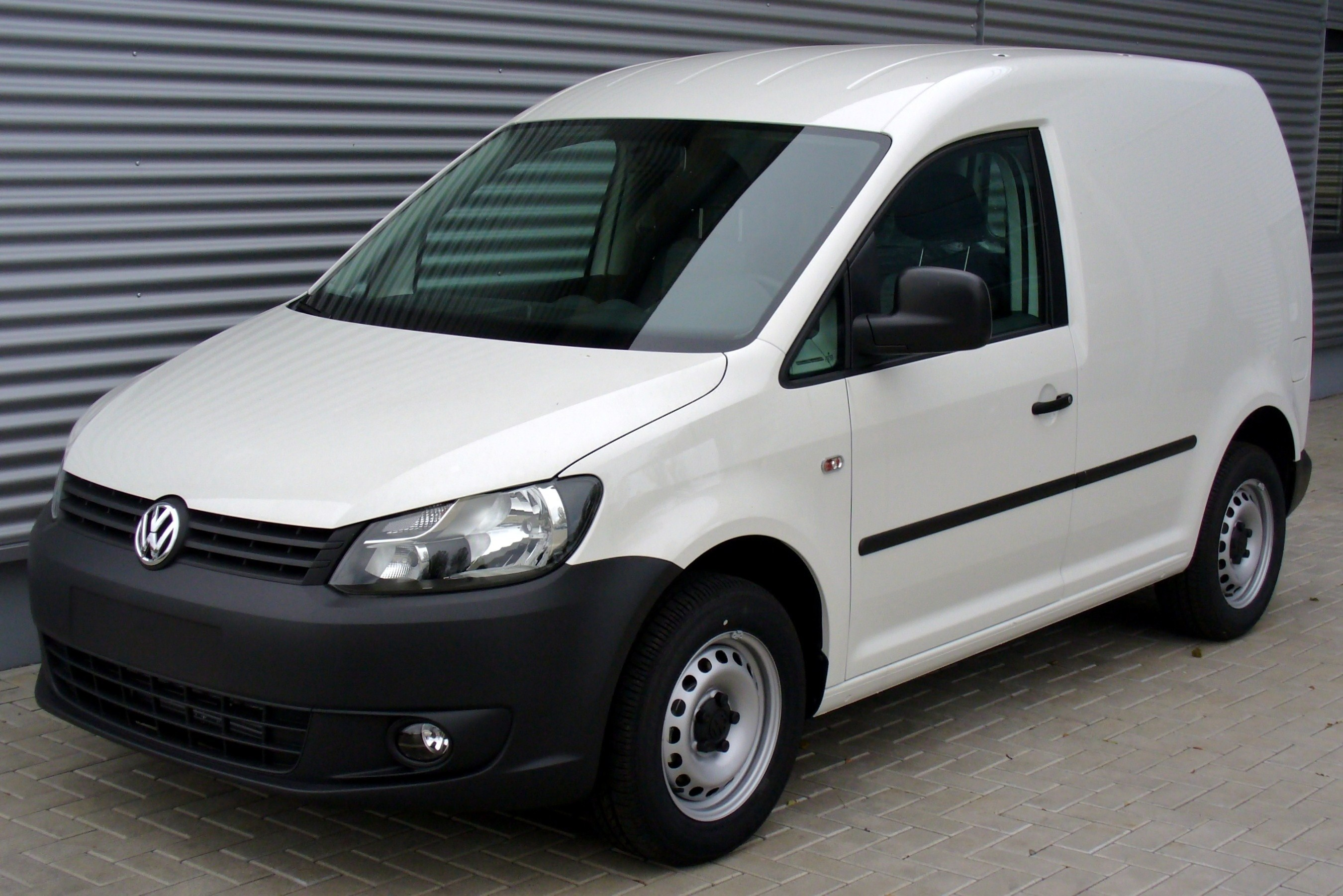
Caddy (Typ 2K) 2005–present

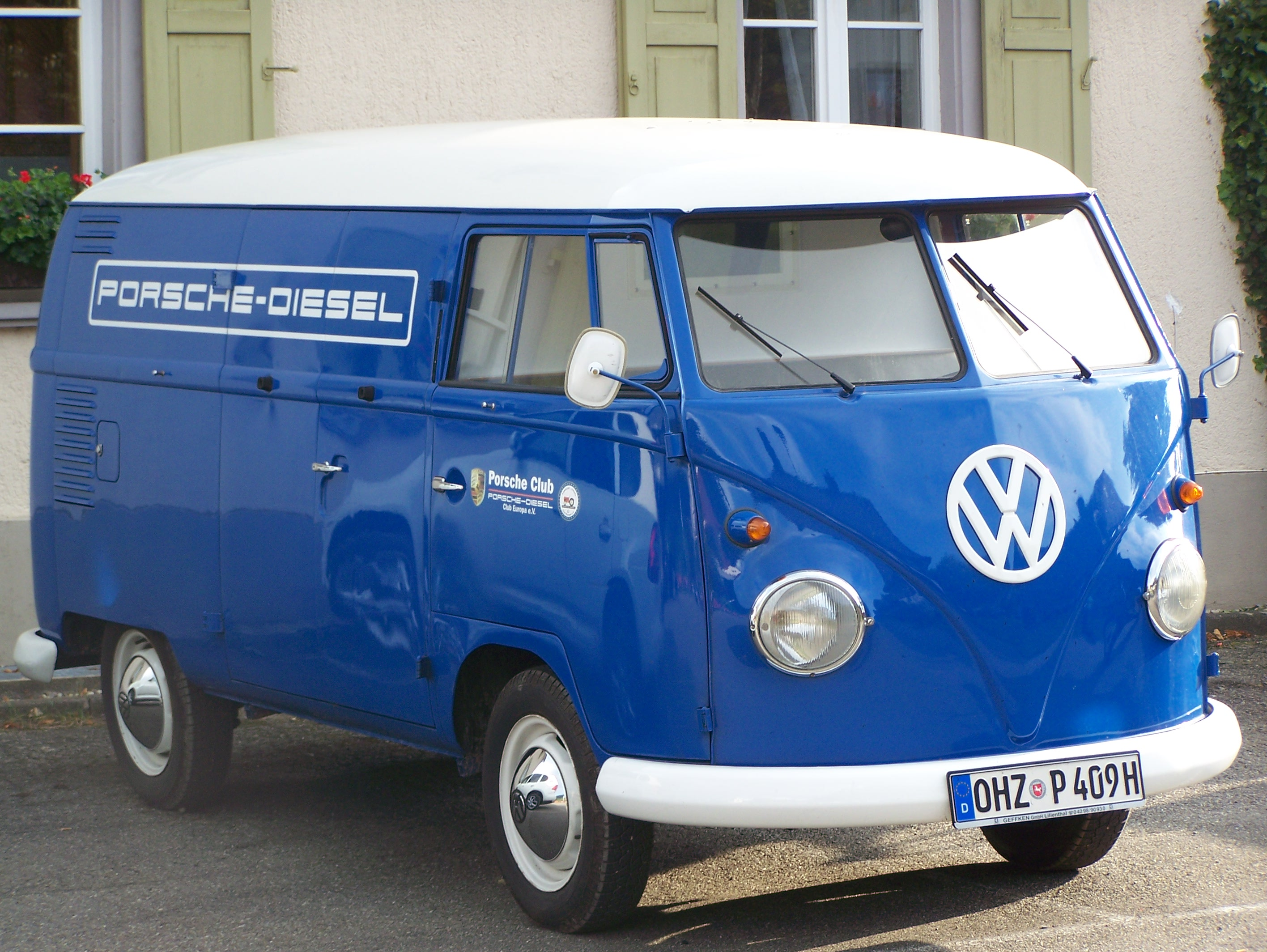
T1 Transporter / Microbus 1950–1967

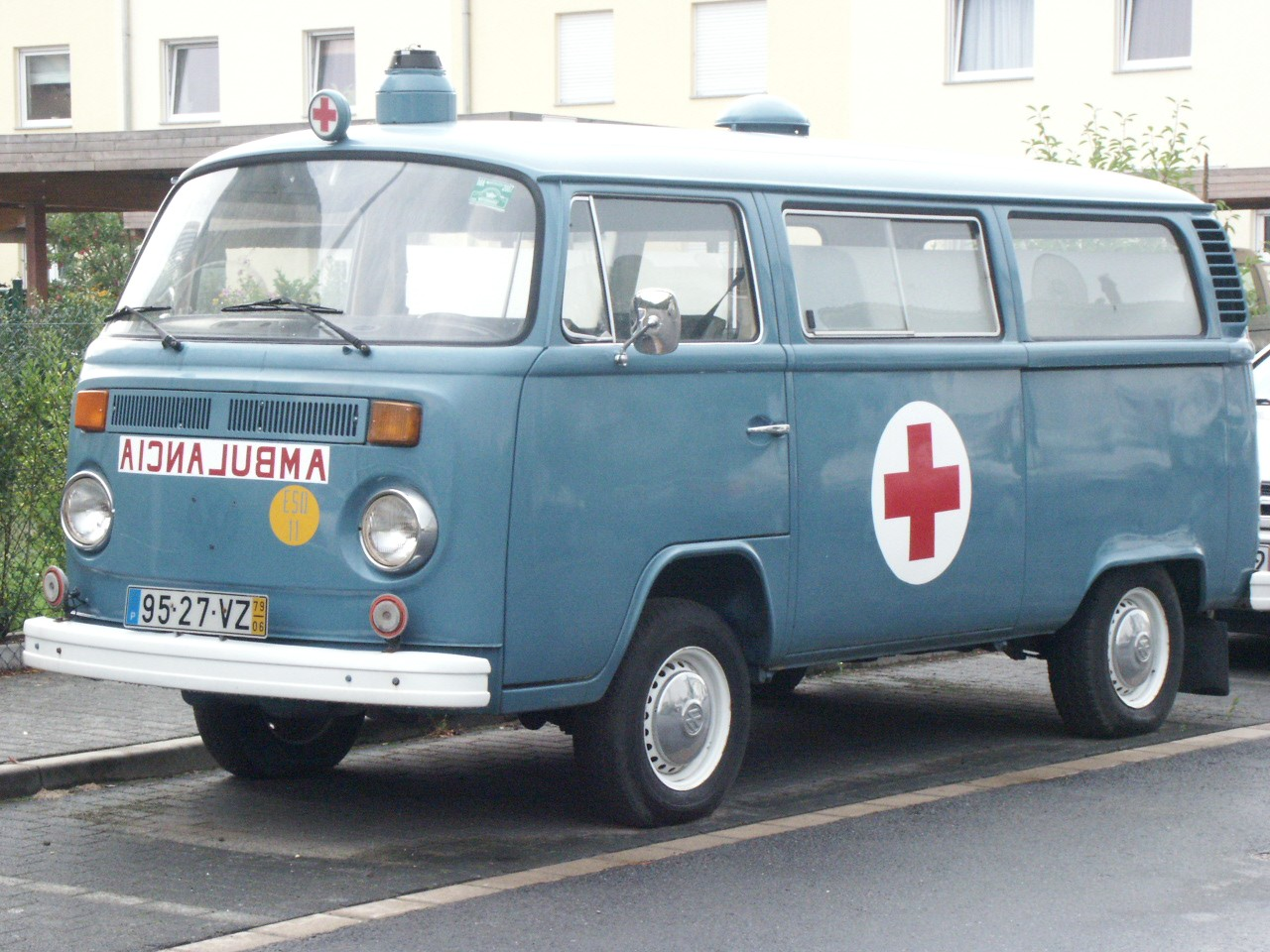
T2 Transporter / Microbus 1967–1979

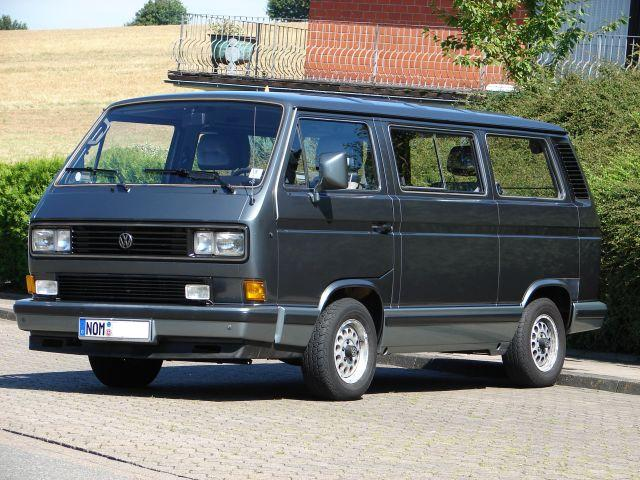
T3 Transporter / Caravelle / Vanagon 1979–1990

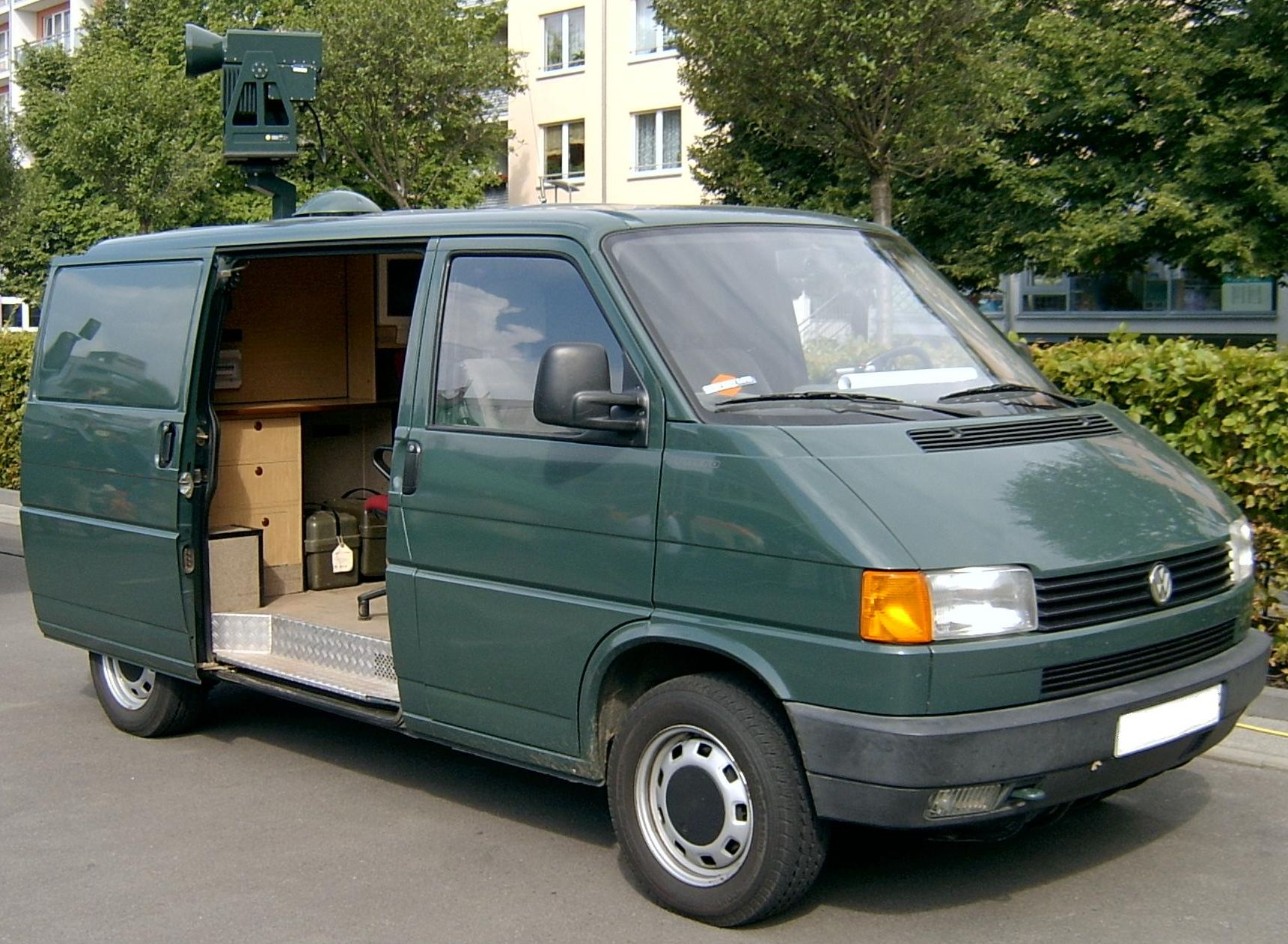
T4 Transporter / Caravelle / Eurovan 1990–2003

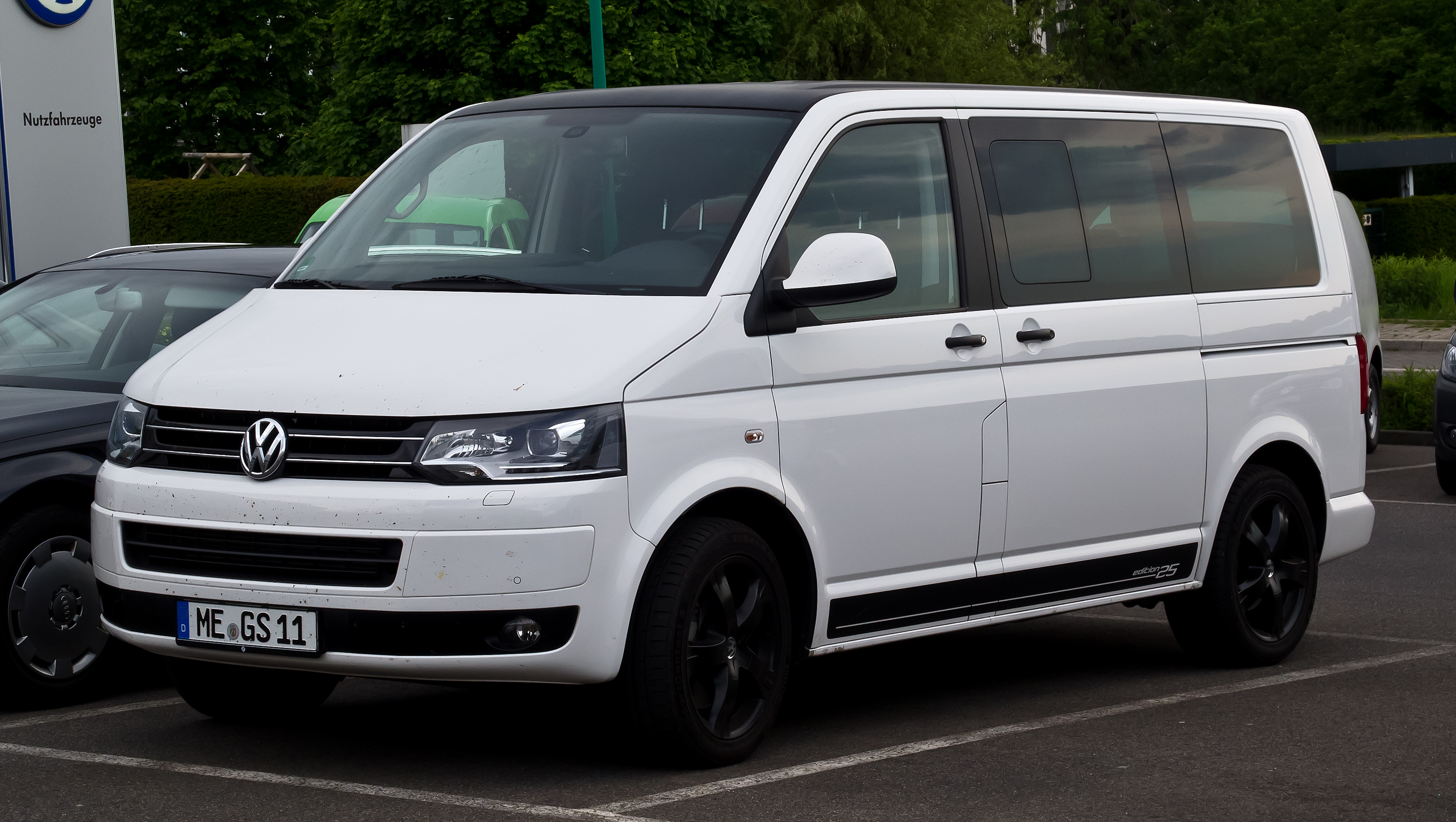
T5 Transporter / Caravelle / Multivan 2003–2015

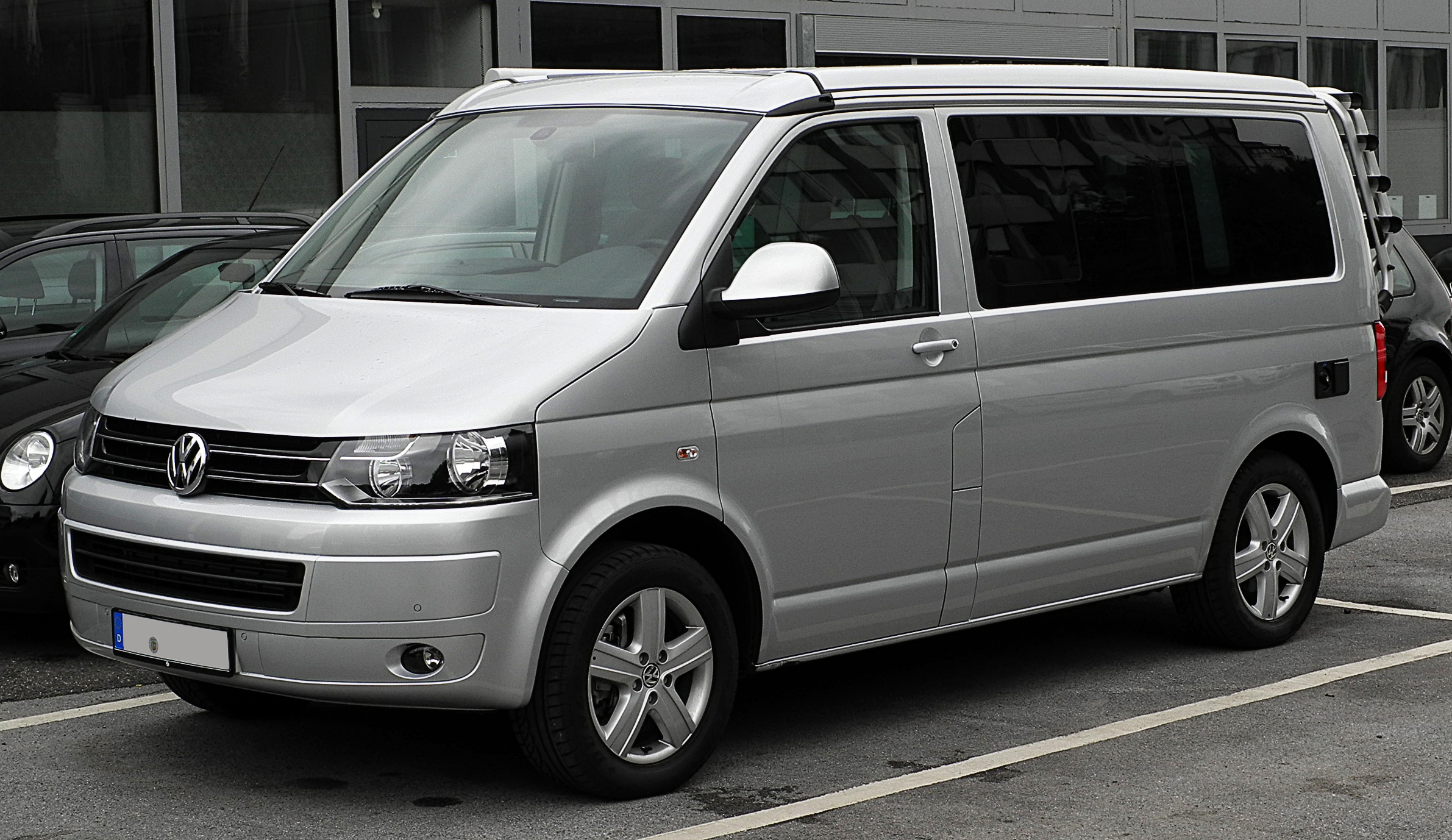
T5 California 2005–2015

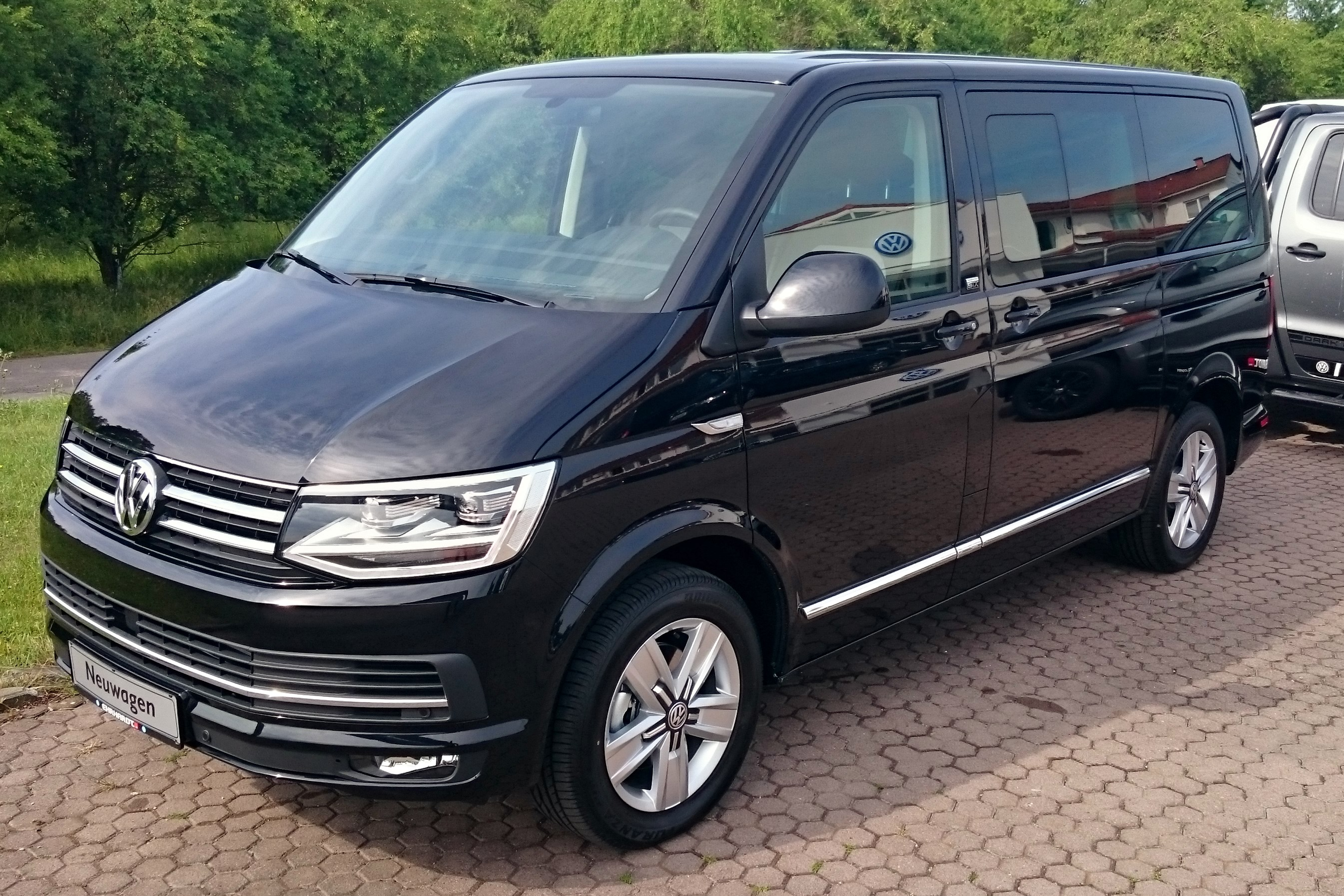
Volkswagen Transporter (T6) T6 Transporter / Caravelle / Multivan 2015–2024

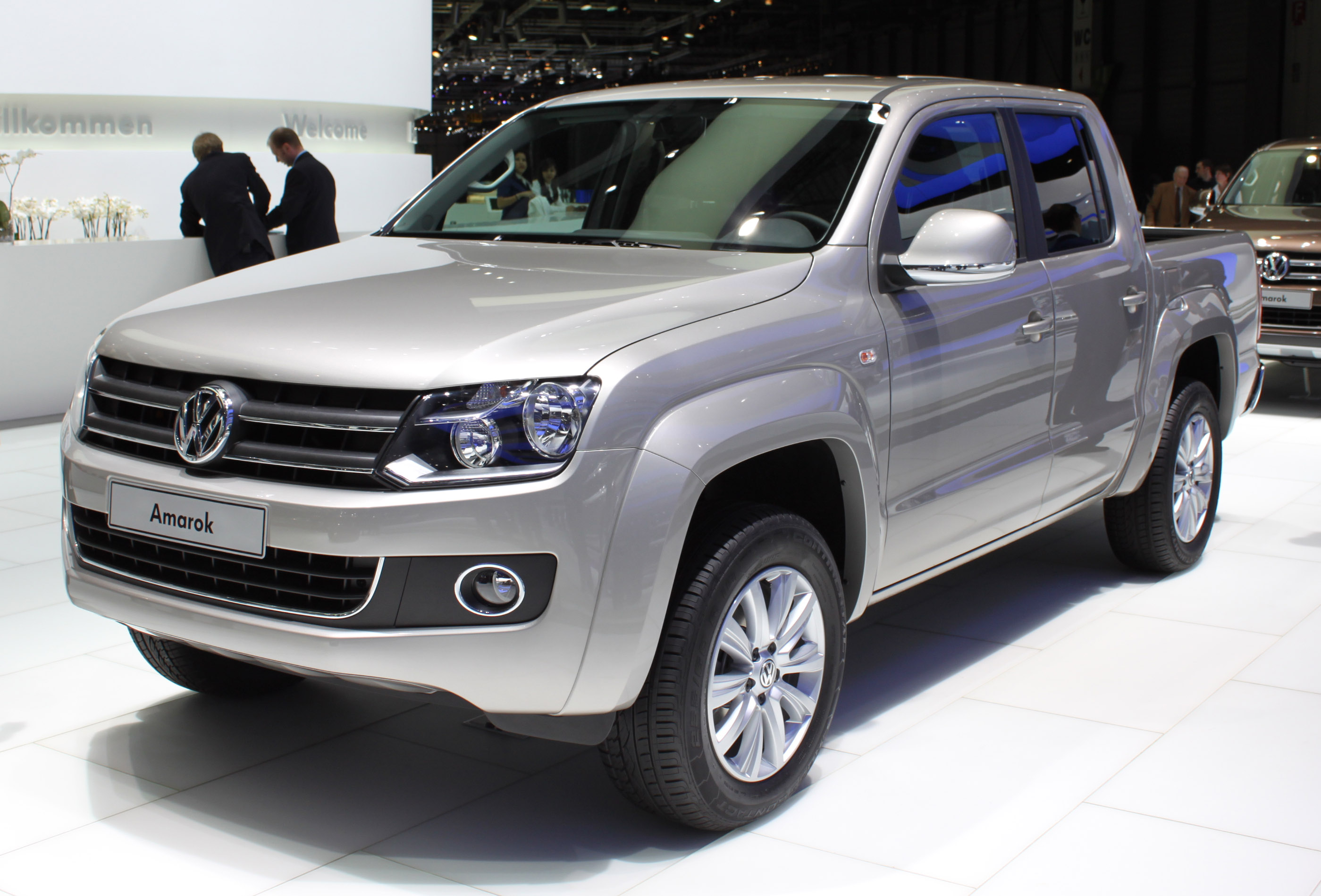
Amarok 2010–present

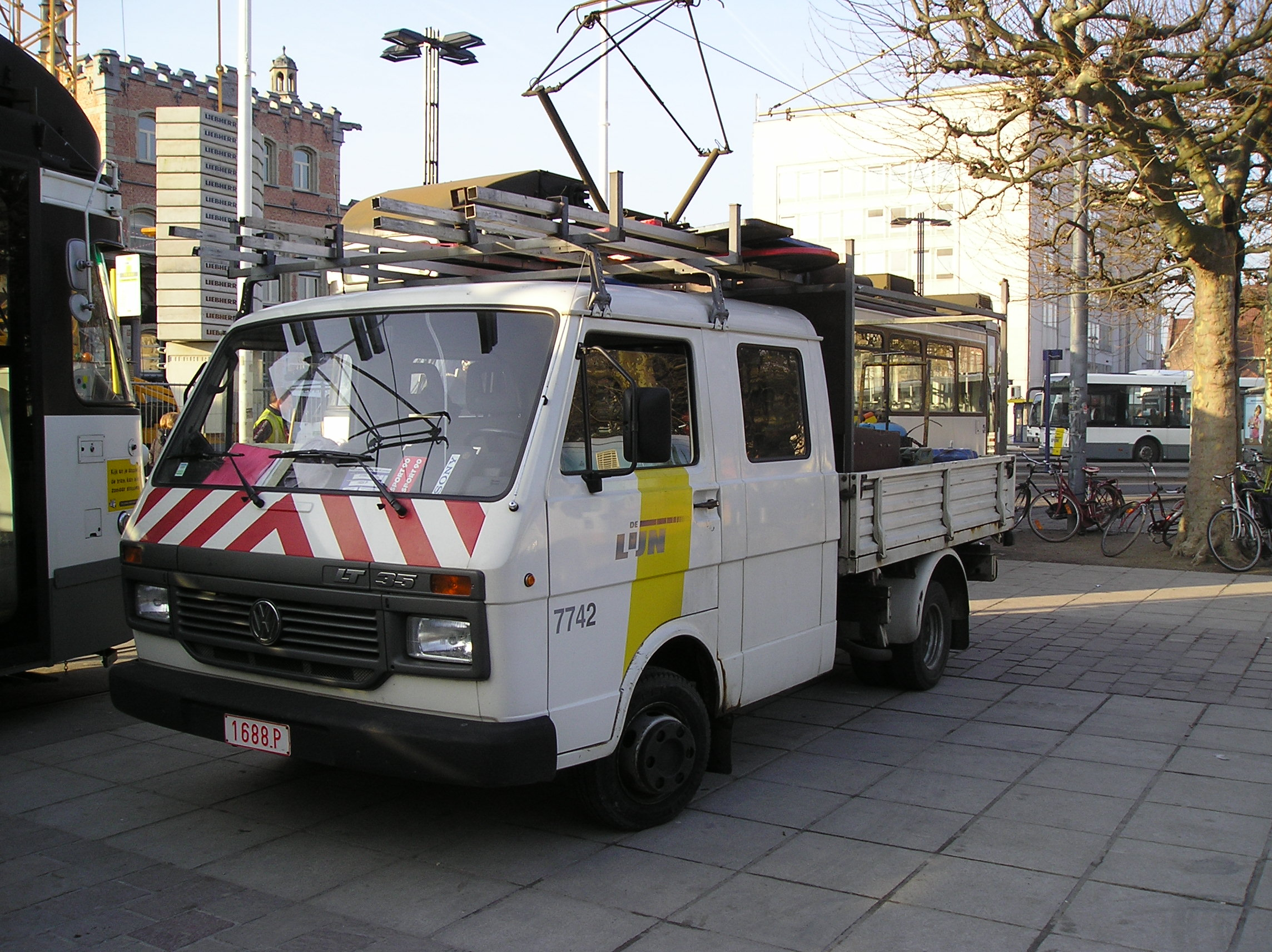
1993 LT Mk1 facelift 1993–1996

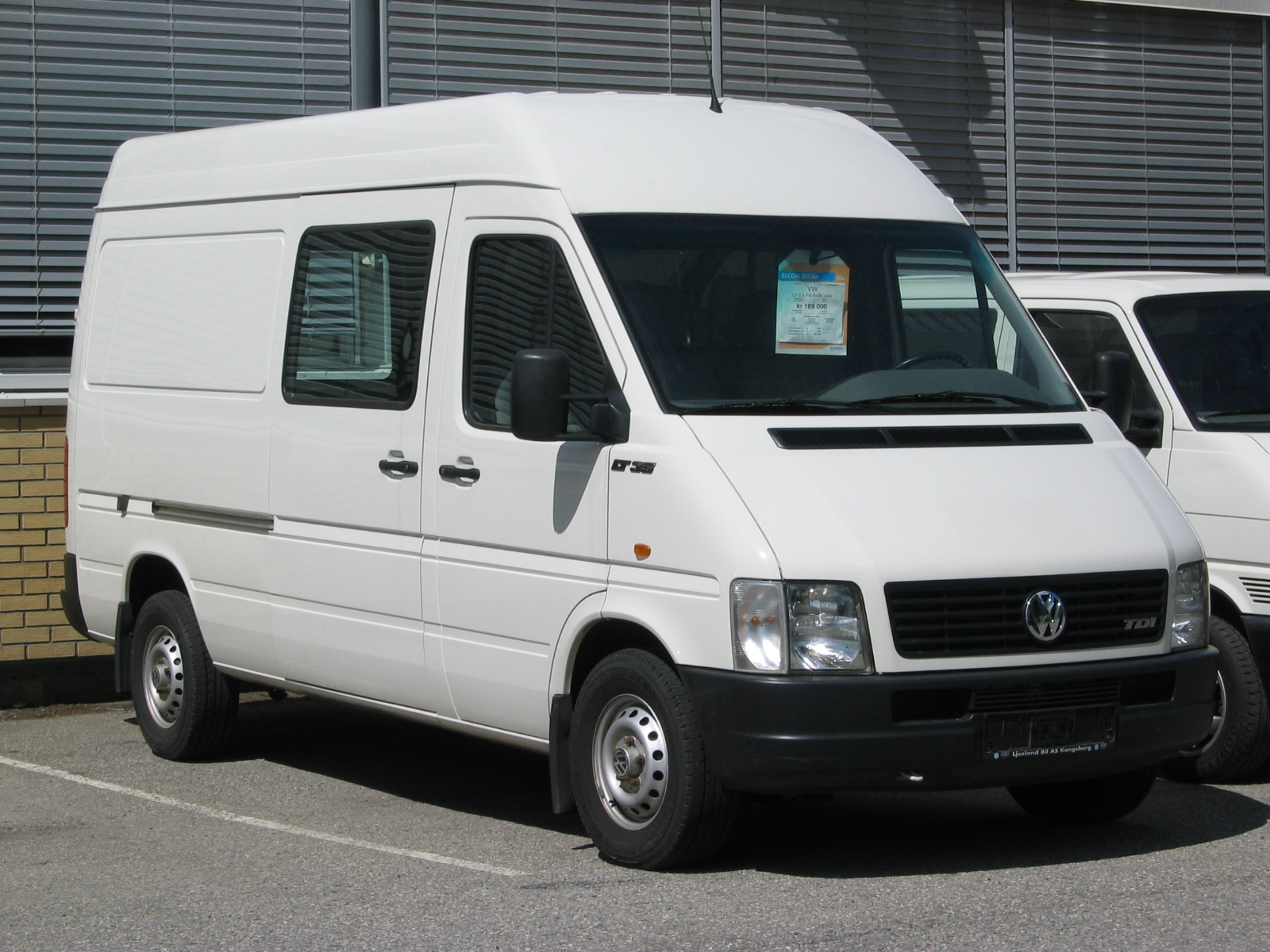
LT Mk2 1996–2005

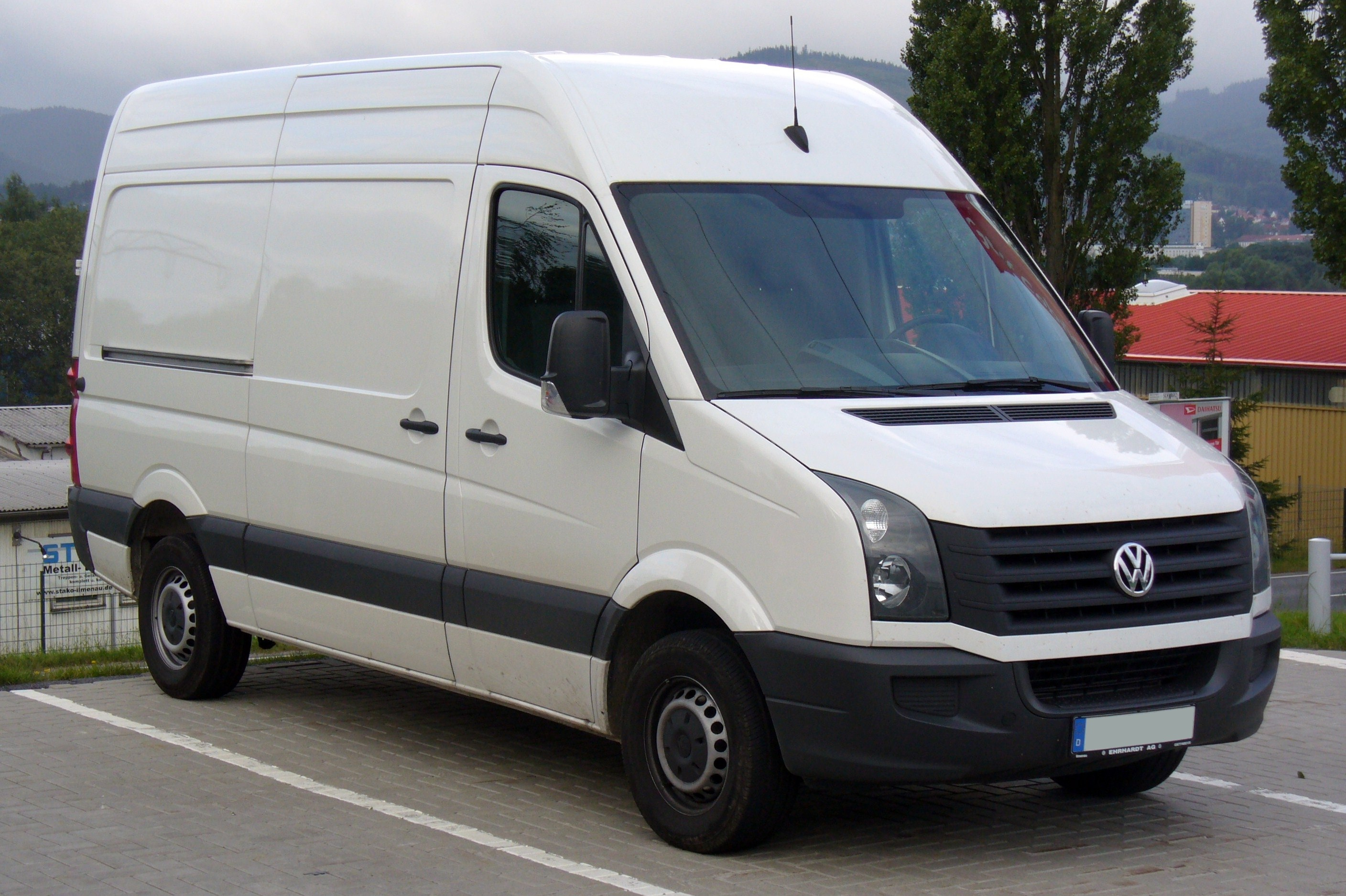
Crafter (LT3) 2006–2017

== Planned developments ==
=== Park Assist ===
Volkswagen self parking system "park assist" which is featured on such models as the Touran, Tiguan and Passat is being developed for implementation on the next Caddy and Crafter.

=== MAN SE light truck venture ===
The Wall Street Journal has reported Volkswagen Commercial Vehicles and MAN SE were to develop a range of light trucks in the 3.5 tonne to 7.5 tonne gross vehicle mass range.

=== Joint venture in India ===
Volkswagen Commercial Vehicles is studying the Indian commercial and bus markets. Interest was shown by prospective customers at the VW display at India's 2008 Auto Expo and VW is considering entering the market with a joint venture initiative.

=== Manufacturing in China ===
In September 2008, Volkswagen Commercial Vehicles was reported to be studying the viability of establishing vehicle assembly operations in China.

== See also ==
- List of automobile manufacturers of Germany
- Volkswagen Caminhões e Ônibus
