= Buzzy =

Buzzy or Buzzie may refer to:

== People ==
- Buzzie Bavasi (1914–2008), American Major League Baseball executive
- David Busfield (born 1953), English rugby league footballer and coach
- Buzzy Cohen (born 1985), American recording executive and Jeopardy! champion
- Buzzy Drootin (1920–2000), legendary jazz drummer
- Buzzy Feiten, North American singer-songwriter, guitarist, and session musician
- Buzzy Hellring or Bernard Hellring, creator of Ultimate Frisbee
- Terry "Buzzy" Johnson (born 1938), American popular music singer, songwriter and music producer
- Buzzy Kerbox (born 1956), American 1990s surfer and model
- A. B. Krongard (born 1936), appointed executive director of the Central Intelligence Agency in 2001
- Buzzy Linhart (1943–2020), American rock performer and musician
- Ralph Maxwell (athlete) (1919–2014), American judge and Masters track and field athlete
- William "Buzzy" McClane, a member of The Cleftones doo-wop singing group
- Buzzie Reutimann (born 1941), American former NASCAR driver
- Curtis Roosevelt (1930–2016), oldest grandson of Franklin D. and Eleanor Roosevelt, nicknamed "Buzzie" in newspapers
- Buzzy Trent (1929–2006), pioneer of big wave surfing
- Buzzy Wares (1886–1964), American Major League Baseball shortstop
- Buzzy Wilkinson (1932–2016), American former basketball player

== Entertainment ==
- "Buzzy" (song), a jazz standard by Charlie Parker
- buzzy, and Buzzy (The Black Album), 1969 and 1972 albums by Buzzy Linhart
- Buzzy, a black stereotype cartoon character introduced in 1946 – see Herman and Katnip
- Buzzy, the title character of Buzzy Boop, 1938 Fleischer Studios animated short film
- Buzzy, the teenage title character of Buzzy, a comic book published by DC Comics from 1944 to 1958
- Buzzy the Knowledge Bug, host of the Junior Field Trips trilogy of children's computer games
- Buzzy, protagonist of Cranium Command, Wonders of Life, EPCOT and subject of Stolen Kingdom
- Buzzie, the title character of The Drugstore Cat, 1949 Ann Petry book

== Other uses ==
- Buzzy or buzzy burr, common name of the plant Acaena magellanica

== See also ==
- Buzzy Bee, popular toy in New Zealand
- Buzi, the mother or father of the priest Ezekiel in the Bible
- Buzy, disambiguation
- Buzz (disambiguation)
- Buzzi
