= Buzz =

Buzz may refer to:

== People ==
- Buzz (nickname), a list of people
- J. Buzz Von Ornsteiner (born 1967; aka Dr. Buzz), American forensic psychologist and journalist

== Arts and entertainment ==
=== Music ===
- Buzz (band), a Korean pop/punk/rock band
- Buzz (Alter Natives album) (1989)
- Buzz (Guardian album) (1995)
- Buzz (Fifteen album) (1996)
- Buzz (Keller Williams album) (1996)
- Buzz (Steps album) (2000)
- Buzz (Autograph album) (2003)
- Buzz (Niki album) (2024)
- "Buzz", a 1993 song by Baby Chaos
- Da Buzz, a Swedish pop music group

=== Fictional characters ===
- Buzz Buzzard, nemesis of Woody Woodpecker
- Buzz Lightyear, a space ranger from the Toy Story franchise
- Buzz McCallister, the malicious older brother from the Home Alone movie trilogy
- Buzz the fruit fly from the animated children's TV series Beat Bugs
- Buzz, from the animated children's TV series Cyberchase
- Buzz, a Reptool in the TV series Dinotrux
- Buzz, in the American fantasy sitcom Out of This World
- Buzz (mascot), mascot of the Georgia Tech Yellow Jackets
- Buzz, in the video game Brawl Stars
- Buzz, from the Donkey Kong video game series
- Buzz, title character of Buzz! games
- Buzz (Marvel Comics), in the Spider-Girl comic book series
- Buzz, a Neopet from an online virtual pet site

=== Other arts and entertainment ===
- Buzz (DC Thomson), a British comic that ran in the 1970s
- Buzz (film), a 1998 Israeli film by Eli Cohen
- Buzz (TV series), a Canadian comedy television series
- Buzz!, a series of quiz video games
- Buzz Cola, a fictional cola drink on The Simpsons
- Buzz (DC), a Washington, D.C. dance party

== Aviation ==
- A low-altitude flypast of an aircraft
- Buzz (Polish airline), a Polish subsidiary of Ryanair
- Buzz (British airline), a British discount airline founded in 1999
- Buzz Airways, a now-defunct virtual airline based in Branson, Missouri

== Technology ==
- Jeskola Buzz, a modular software music studio environment
- Aeroelasticity, fluid instability, or flutter
- Yahoo! Buzz, a community launched by Yahoo! that publishes user-posted news stories
- Google Buzz, a social update mechanism integrated into various Google products
- Block Buzz, an LLM harness for multiple users that runs on Nostr

== Other uses ==
- Volkswagen ID. Buzz, an electric minivan produced by Volkswagen
- Buzz (dinghy), a sailing dinghy
- Salt Lake Buzz, former name of the Salt Lake Bees minor league baseball team
- Marketing buzz, a term used in word-of-mouth marketing

== See also ==
- Buzz cut, American name for a type of haircut in which the hair is sheared very closely to the scalp
- Buzz number, letter and number combination applied to U.S. Air Force aircraft after World War II
- "Through with Buzz", a 1974 song from Pretzel Logic
- The Buzz (disambiguation)
- Buz (disambiguation)
- Buss (disambiguation)
- Bus (disambiguation)
