= Bruzzo =

Bruzzo is a surname. Notable people with the surname include:

- Alicia Bruzzo (1945–2007), Argentine actress
- Michele Bruzzo (born 1999), Italian footballer

== See also ==
- Bruzzi
