= Volkswagen Bus =

Volkswagen Bus or Volkswagen Van is a type of vehicle produced by Volkswagen/Volkswagen Commercial Vehicles.

There have been a number of notable versions of it produced.

== Volkswagen Bus light commercial vehicles ==
Six generations of Volkswagen Transporter (a.k.a. Microbus) vans:

- Volkswagen Type 2
  - Volkswagen Type 2 (T1, 1950), generation T1 (Microbus, or Split-screen bus)
  - Volkswagen Type 2 (T2, 1967), generation T2 ("Bay window" bus)
- Volkswagen Type 2 (T3, 1979), generation T3 (Vanagon)
- Volkswagen Transporter (T4, 1990), generation T4 (EuroVan)
- Volkswagen Transporter (T5, 2003), generation T5 (EuroVan)
- Volkswagen Transporter (T6 2016), generation T6
- Volkswagen ID. Buzz the electric version started in 2022, derived from the I.D. Buzz (Electric Microbus) and ID. Buzz Cargo concept vehicles.
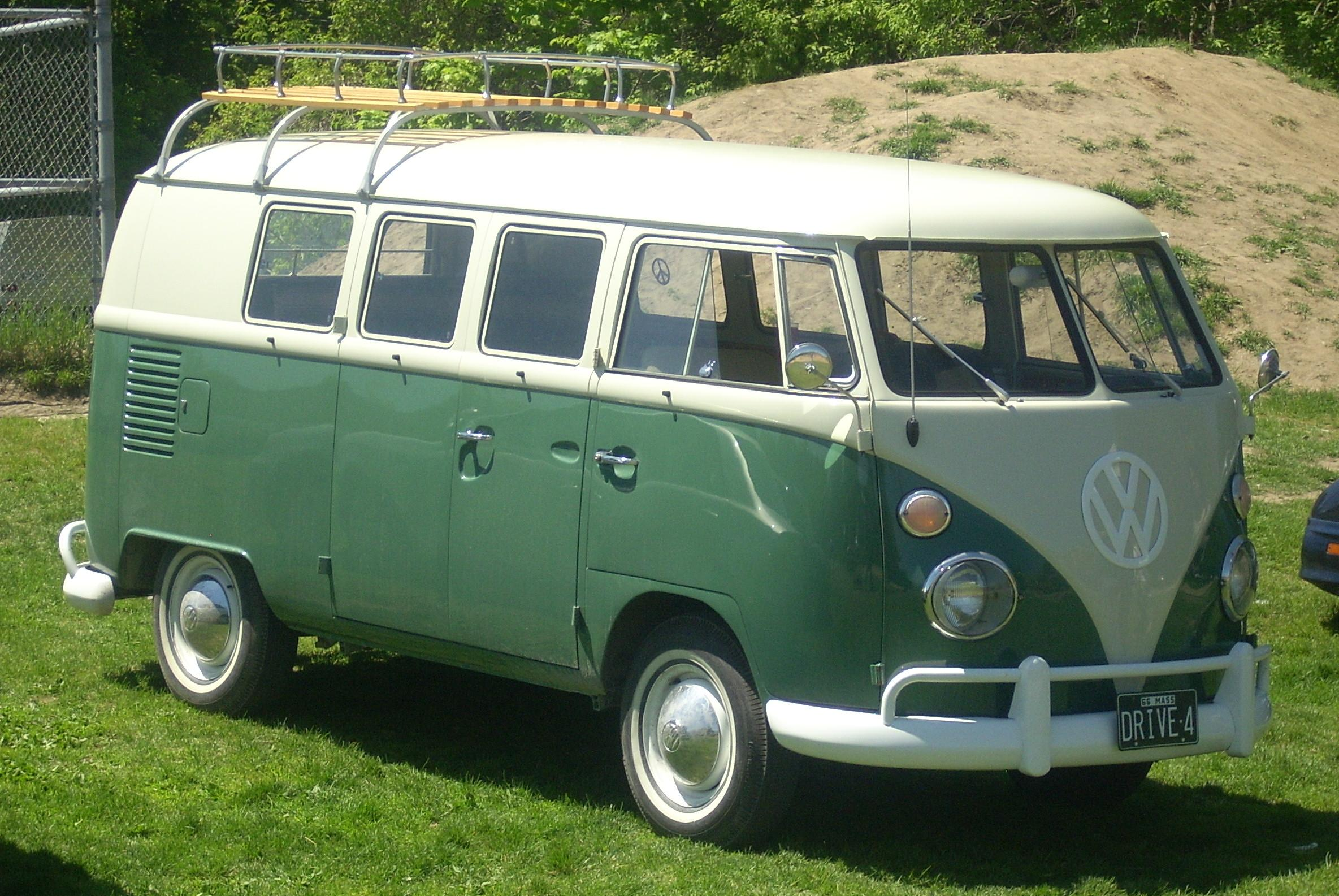
T1

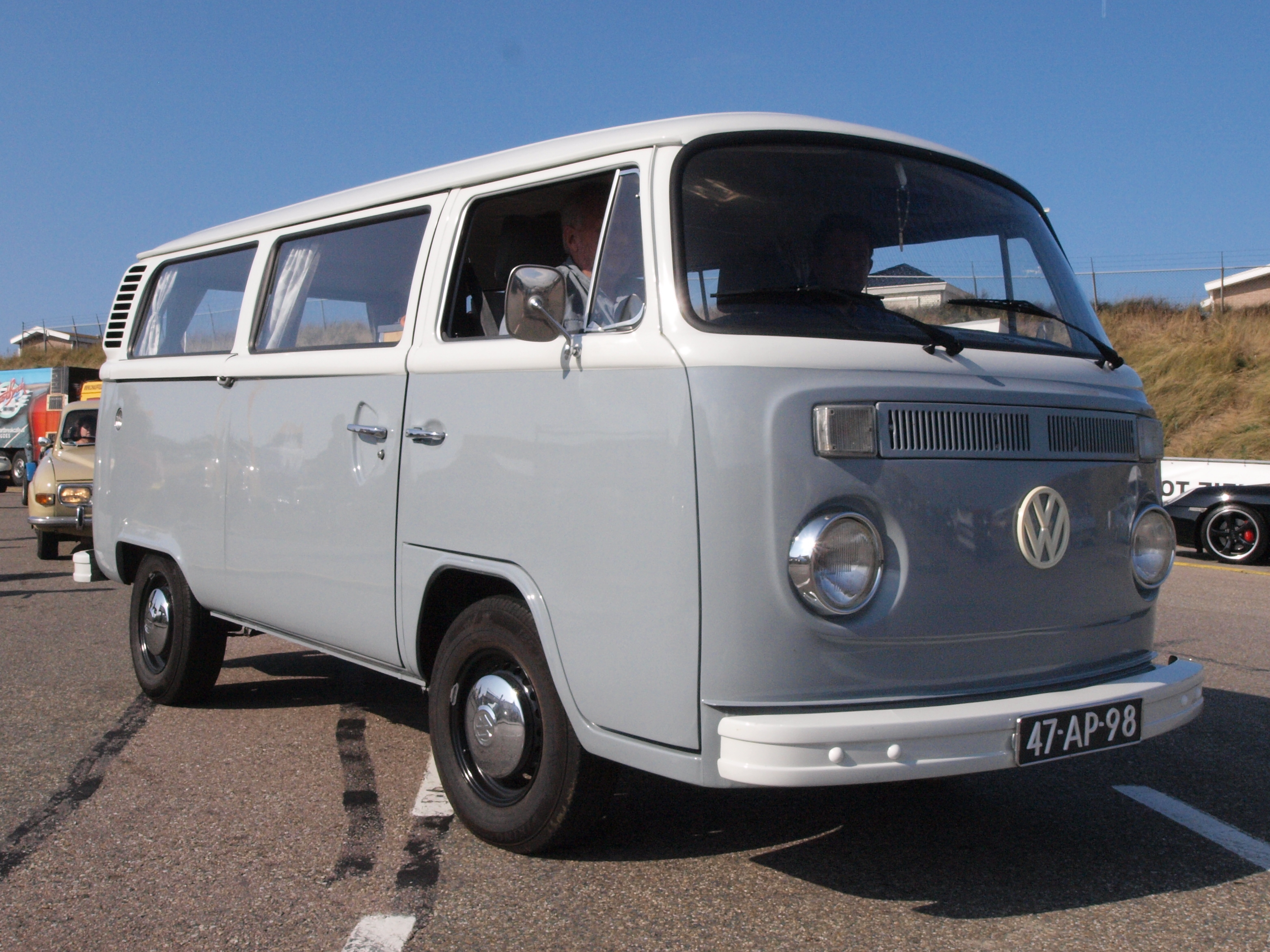
T2

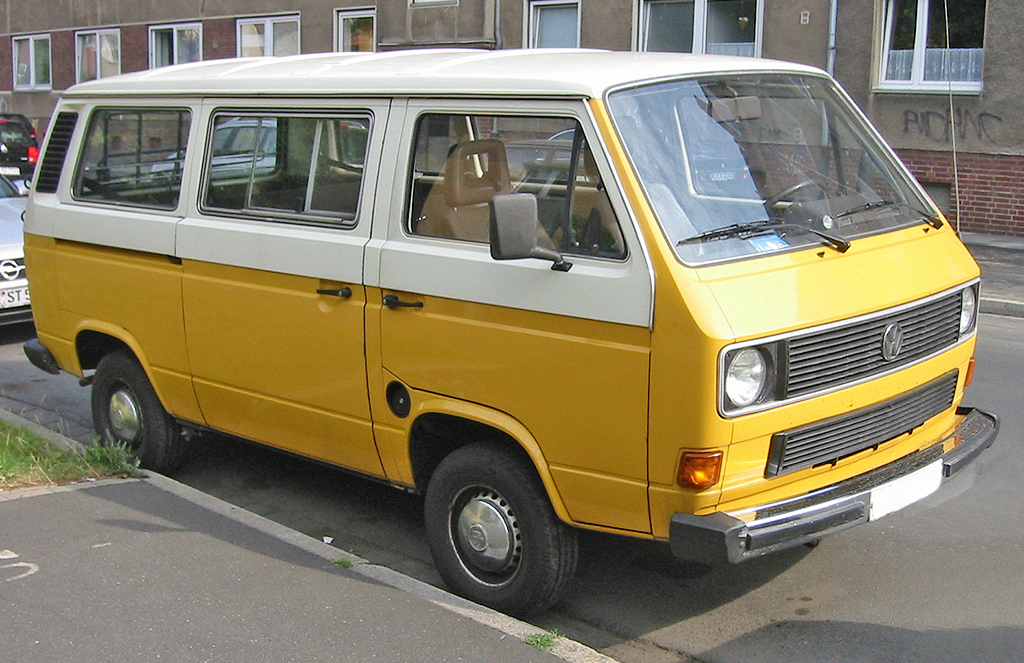
T3

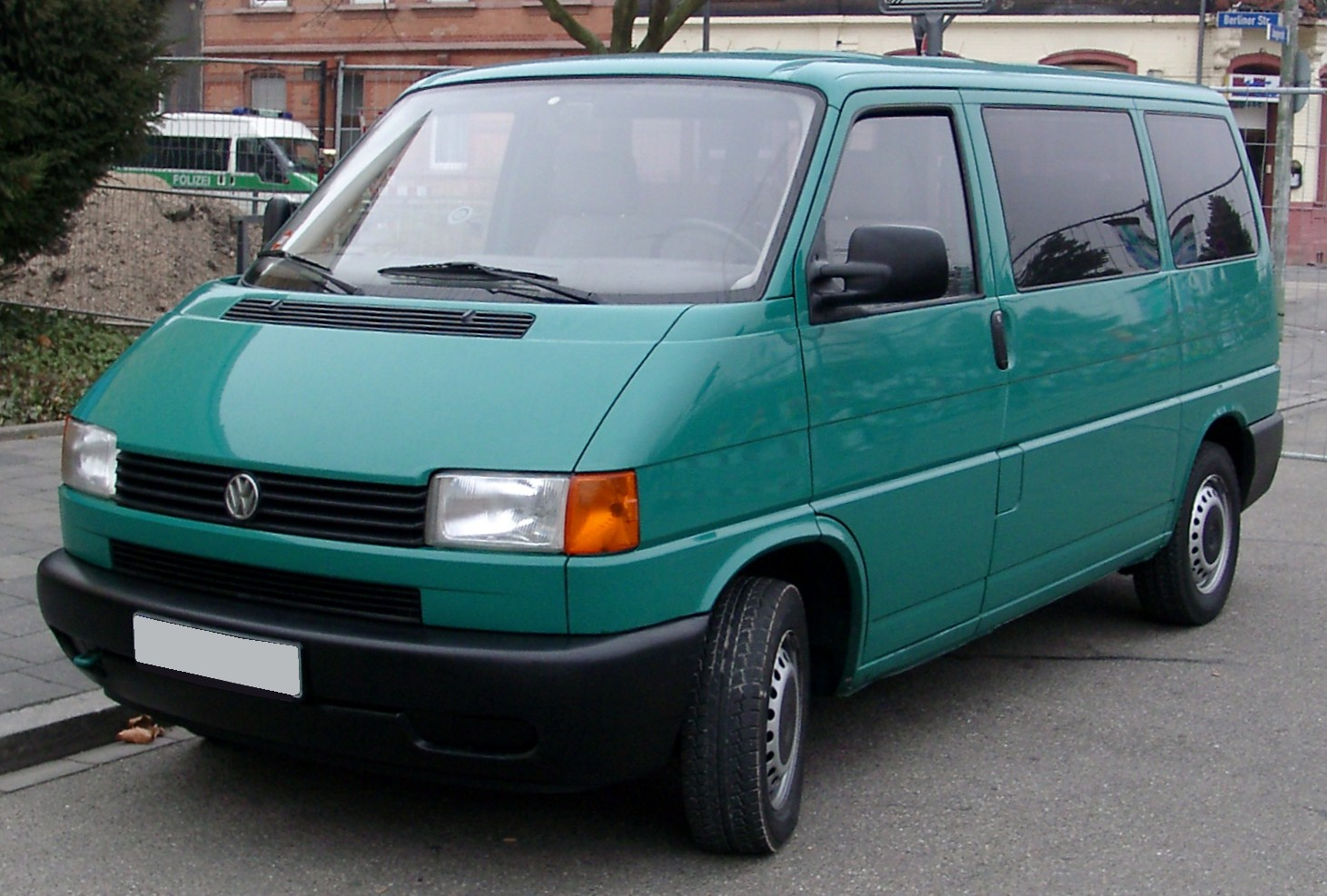
T4

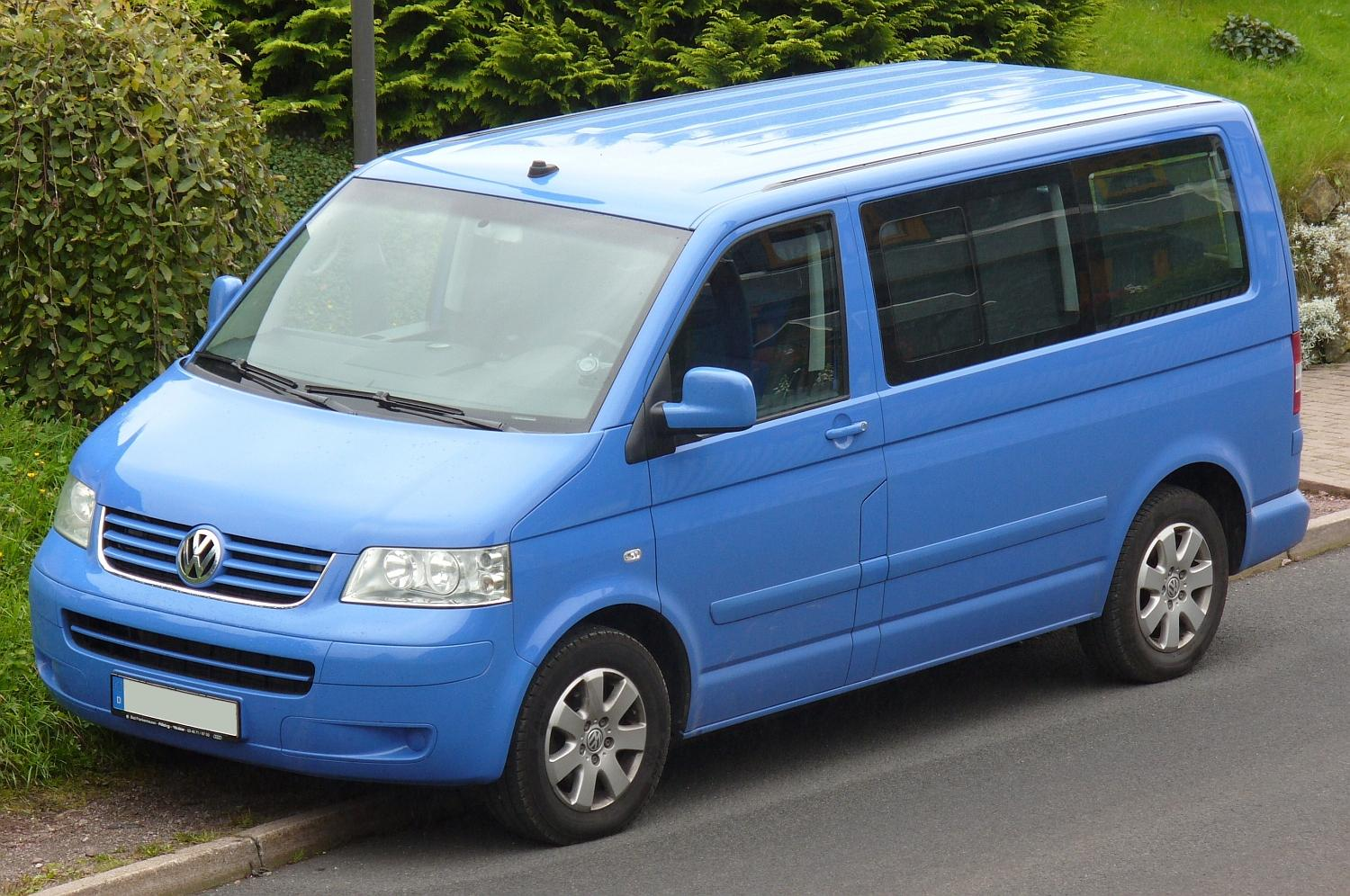
T5

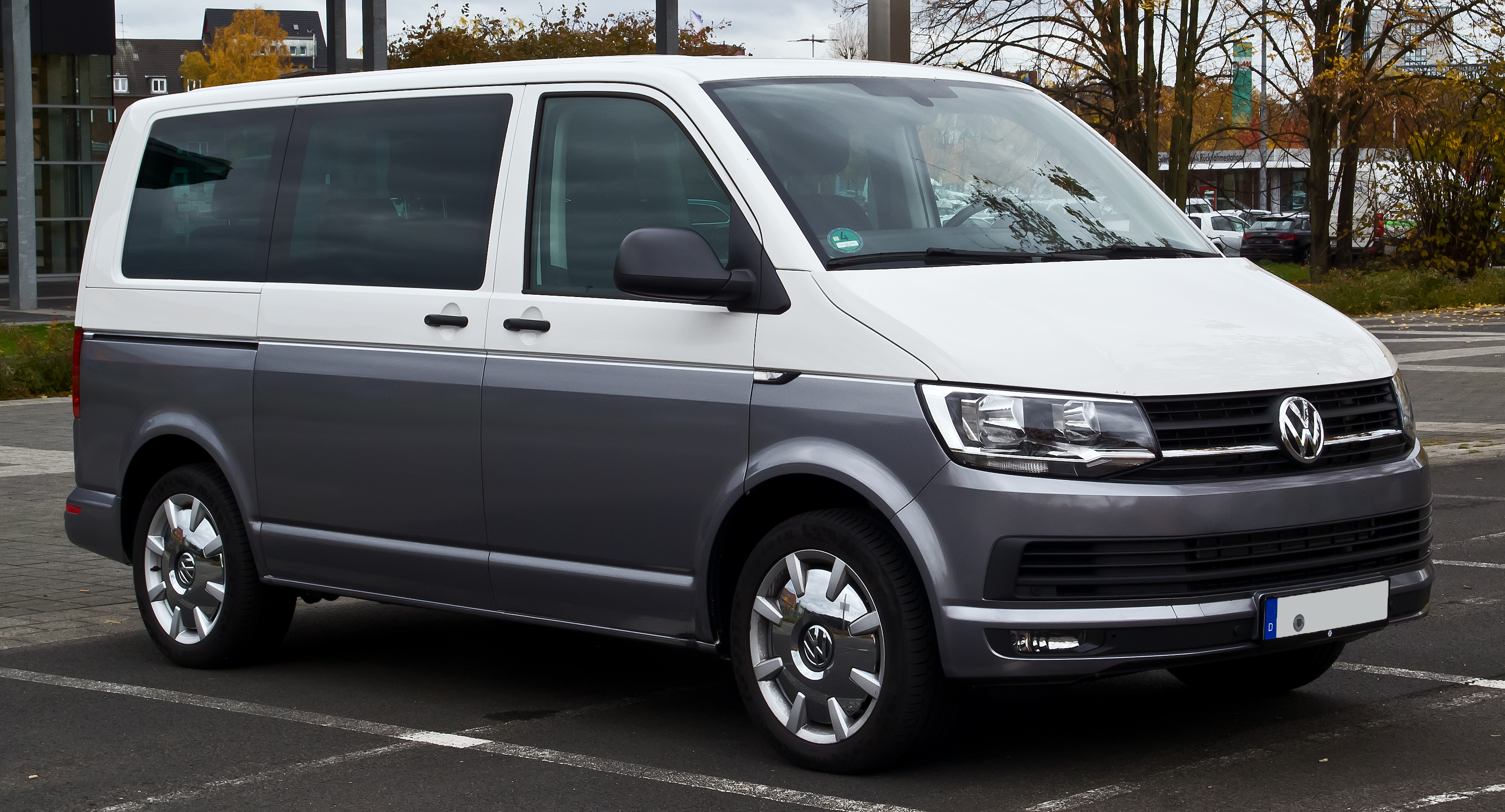
T6

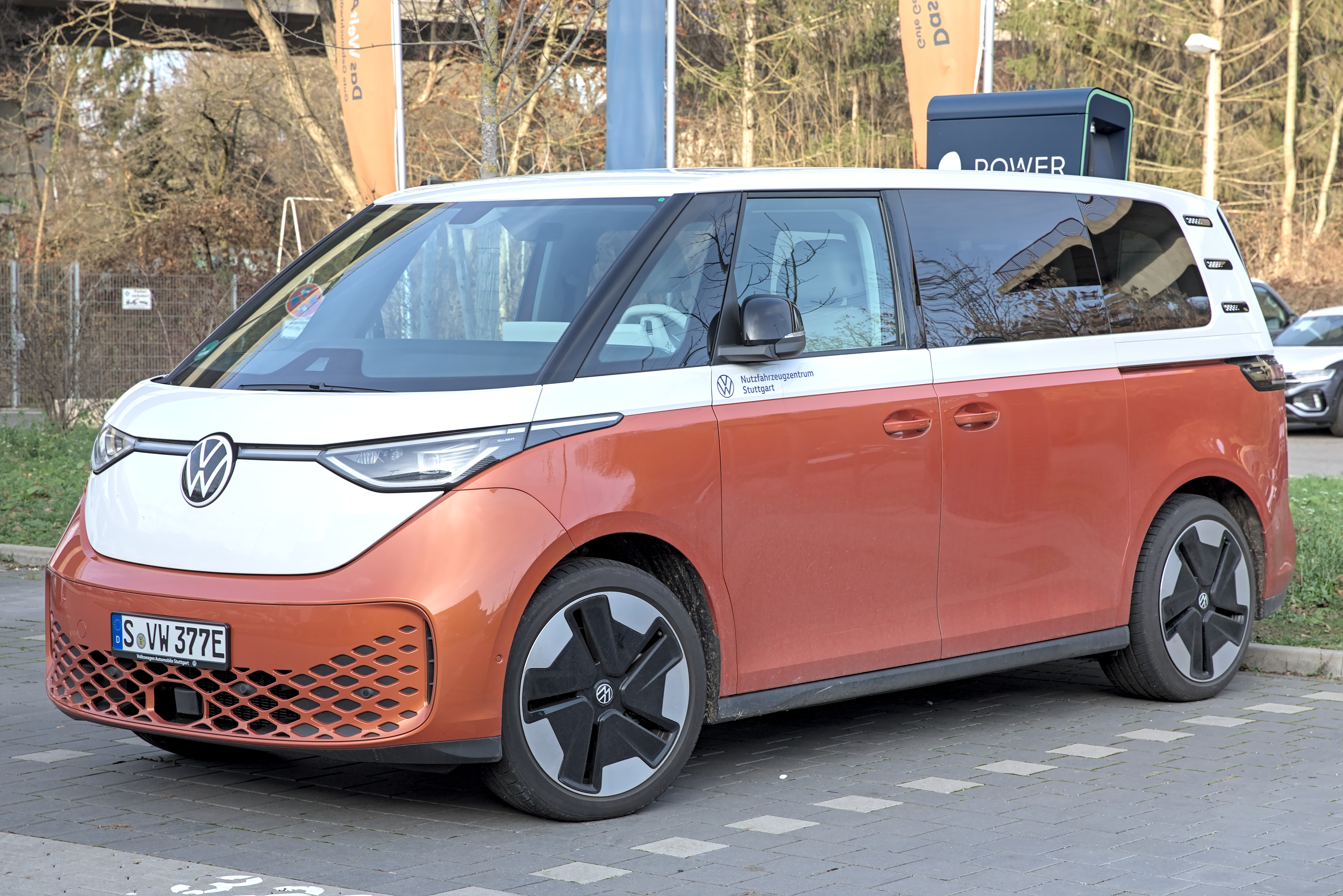
VW ID Buzz

== Heavy commercial vehicles ==
- Volkswagen Volksbus, built by Brazilian company Volkswagen Caminhões e Ônibus

== See also ==
- Westfalia VW bus campers
- Vanagon VW bus campers
- Volkswagen ID. Buzz the electric version of 2020s
