= Bruzzi =

Bruzzi is a surname. Notable people with the surname include:

- Fabiano Bruzzi, Brazilian Paralympic footballer
- Stefano Bruzzi (1835–1911), Italian painter
- Stella Bruzzi (born 1962), Italian-born British scholar of film and media studies

== See also ==
- Bruzz
- Bruzzese
- Buzzi
