= Volkswagen Microbus/Bulli concept vehicles =

Microbus
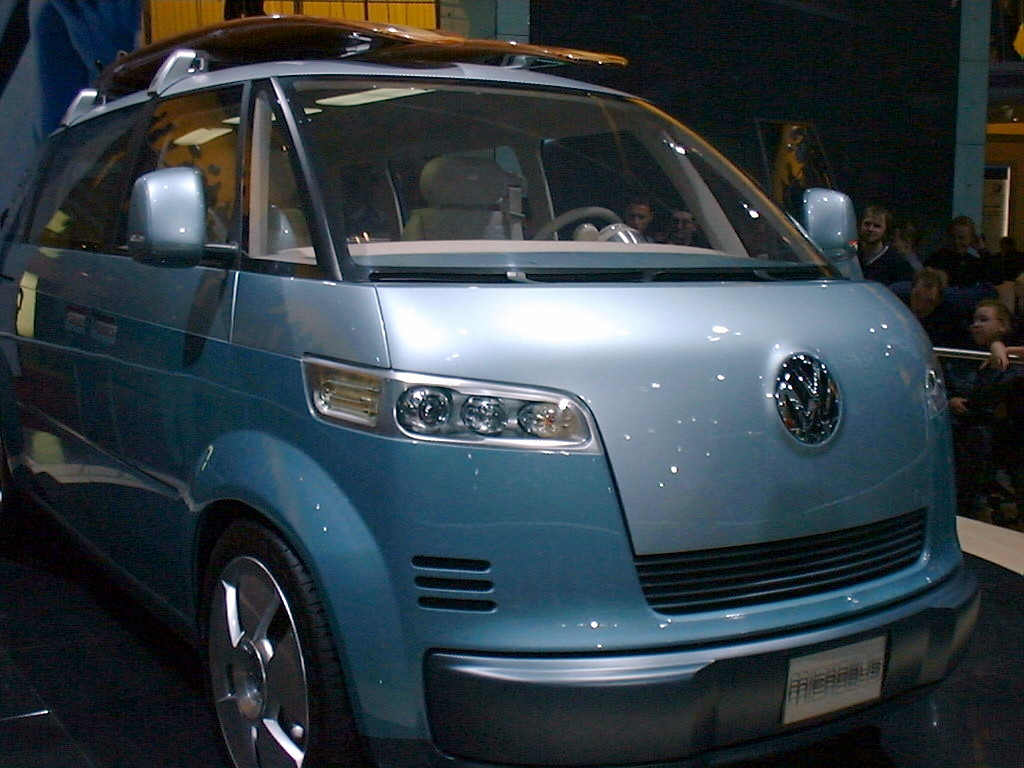
- Microbus (2001) at IAA 2001

Overview
- Manufacturer: Volkswagen

Body and chassis
- Body style: 3 and 4 door minivan
- Related: Volkswagen Transporter (T5)

Dimensions
- Length: 5 m (15.5 ft)

Chronology
- Predecessor: Volkswagen Type 2; Volkswagen Transporter (T4)
- Successor: Volkswagen Bulli

The Volkswagen Microbus/Bulli concept vehicles are a series of concept cars that are styled to recall the original Volkswagen Microbus built by Volkswagen AG. The first of these was the Volkswagen Microbus Concept Car (also known as the New Microbus and Microbus Concept), first presented at the 2001 North American International Auto Show (NAIAS).

Later concepts included the Bulli (2011), BUDD-e (2016), and ID BUZZ (2017), all battery electric vehicle concepts, and the ID BUZZ has now gone into production after its launch in 2022.

== Design ==
The new Microbus Concept was completely modern compared to the Type 2, featuring a 7-inch screen in the center console and a second ceiling-located 7-inch screen that allowed the driver to see behind the vehicle. Passengers had 8-inch screens mounted in the seatbacks for video entertainment. The Microbus Concept was approximately the same size as the contemporary Volkswagen Eurovan, and was powered by a newly developed 3.2L V-6 engine with stated output of 172 kW (231 hp) and 320 N⋅m (236 lb⋅ft).

Styling of the Microbus Concept was handled by Volkswagen's California Design Studio in Simi Valley.

== History ==
The Microbus Concept debuted at the 2001 NAIAS in Detroit. In June 2002 Volkswagen announced the Microbus Concept, using the platform of the forthcoming T5 light van, was slated for production commencing during 2003 at the company's Hannover plant, ramping up to 80,000 units annually by 2005. The launch was deferred, however, and the project was canceled in spring 2004.

In 2005, VW instead announced that Chrysler would build minivans for Volkswagen in the United States, while in Europe the VW Transporter Multivan would fill the niche previously intended for the reborn Microbus. The Chrysler built Volkswagen Routan was released to the North American market in September 2008. Unrelated to the new Microbus, the Routan is a seven-seat minivan and is a rebadged variant of the Chrysler RT platform, fifth-generation Dodge Grand Caravan and Chrysler Town & Country.

== Battery electric successors ==
=== Bulli (2011) ===
Bulli
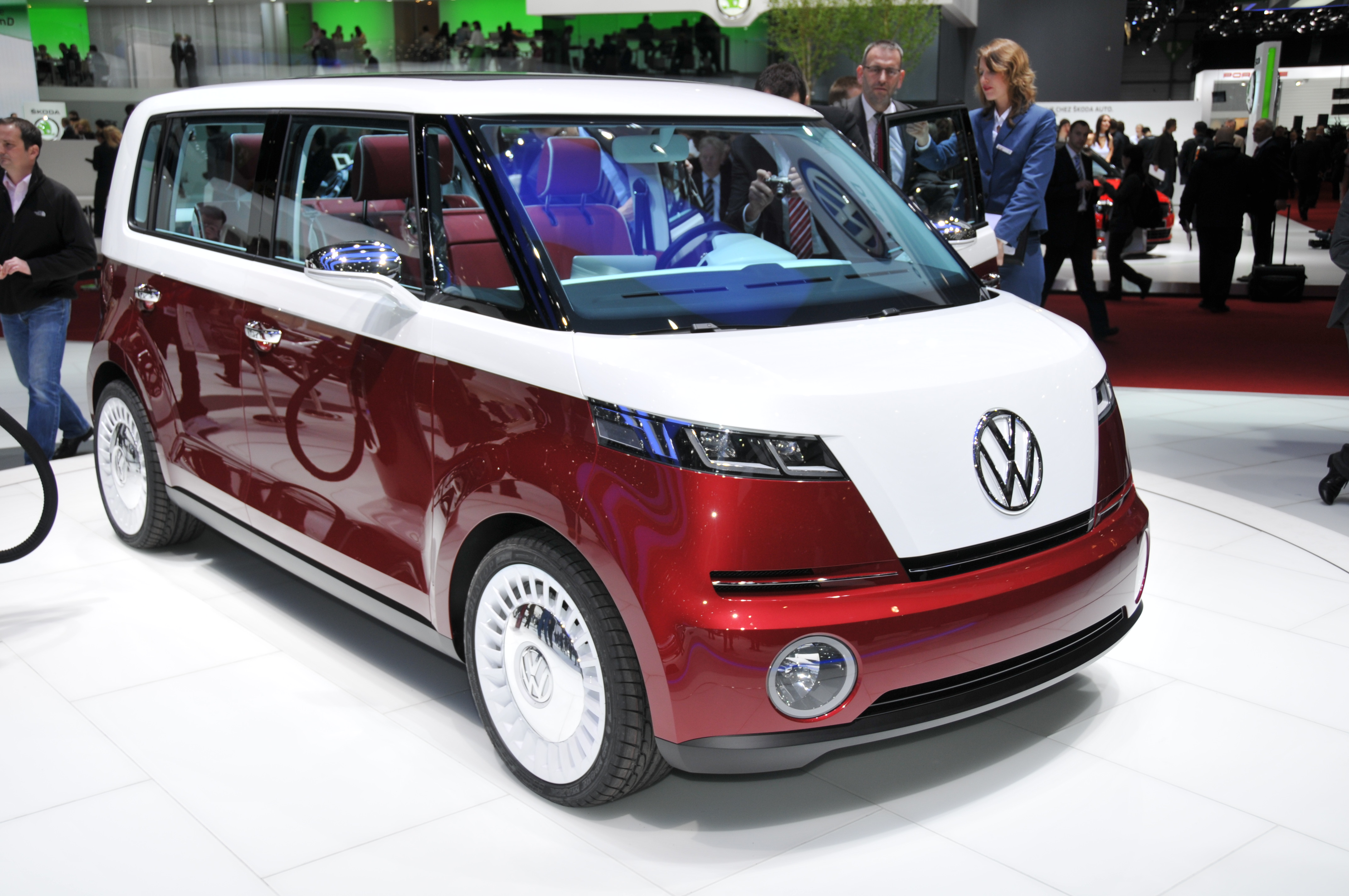
- Bulli at the 2011 Geneva Motor Show

Overview
- Manufacturer: Volkswagen

Body and chassis
- Body style: minivan

Dimensions
- Wheelbase: 2,590 mm (102 in)
- Length: 3,960 mm (156 in)
- Width: 1,740 mm (68.4 in)
- Height: 1,680 mm (66 in)

Chronology
- Predecessor: Volkswagen Microbus concept
- Successor: Volkswagen BUDD-e

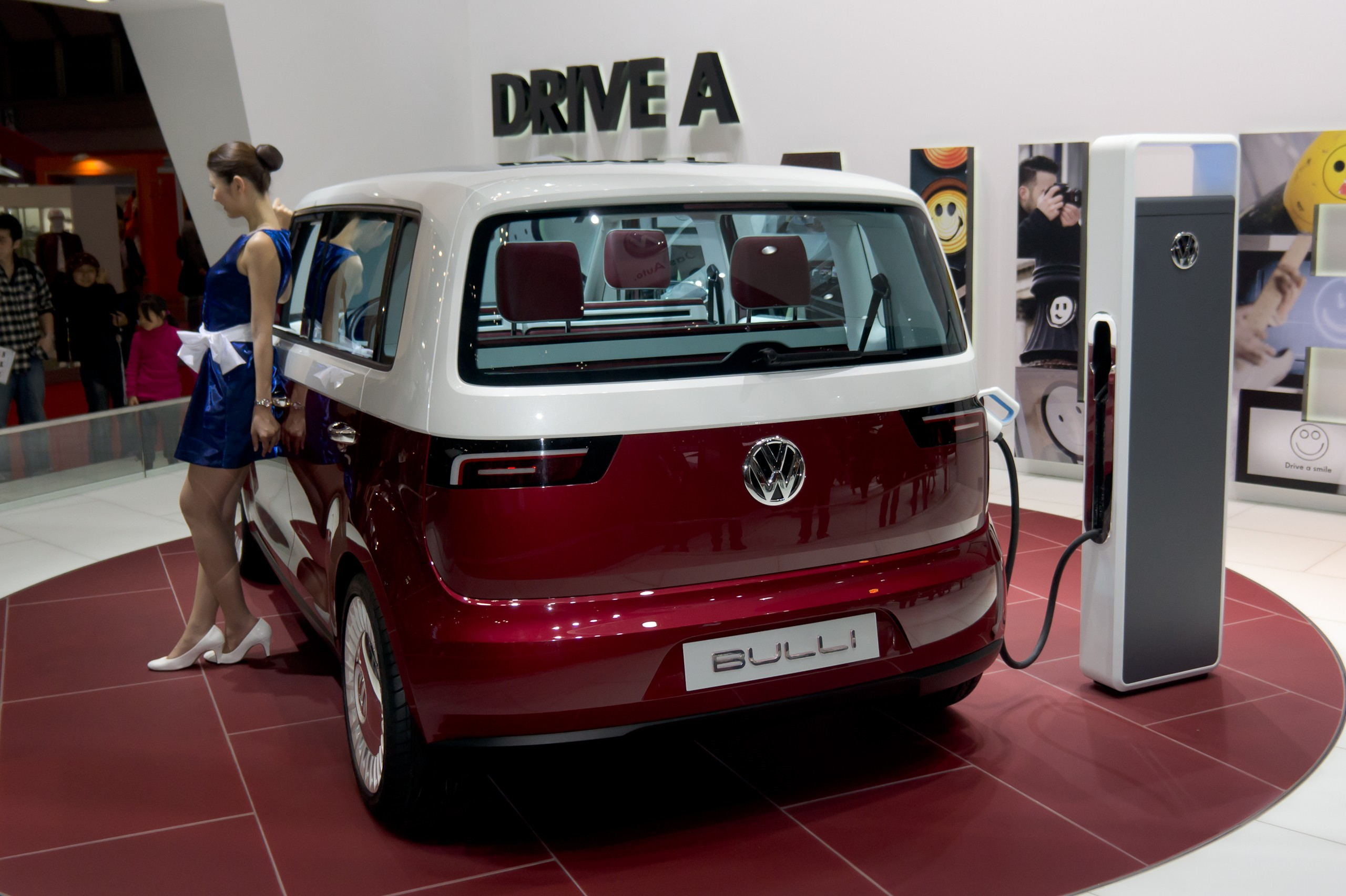
Bulli concept, on display at the 2011 Tokyo Motor Show

In September 2008, Autoblog reported that the Microbus Concept might actually yet be produced, and at the 2011 Geneva Motor Show, Volkswagen unveiled a second, smaller concept van (also reminiscent of the first generation Transporter) called the Bulli. In the event, the Bulli also was not actually produced as envisioned in 2011.

The Bulli concept was powered by a 85 kW (114 hp) motor that developed 270 N⋅m (199 lb⋅ft) of torque, drawing from a 40 kWh (140 MJ) battery for up to 186 mi (299 km) of range. Rear seats may be folded, expanding cargo room from 370 to 1,590 L (13 to 56 ft^{3}). The interior featured two rows of bench seats and could accommodate six people; dimensions were similar to the earlier Space Up! concept car.

=== BUDD-e (2016) ===
BUDD-e
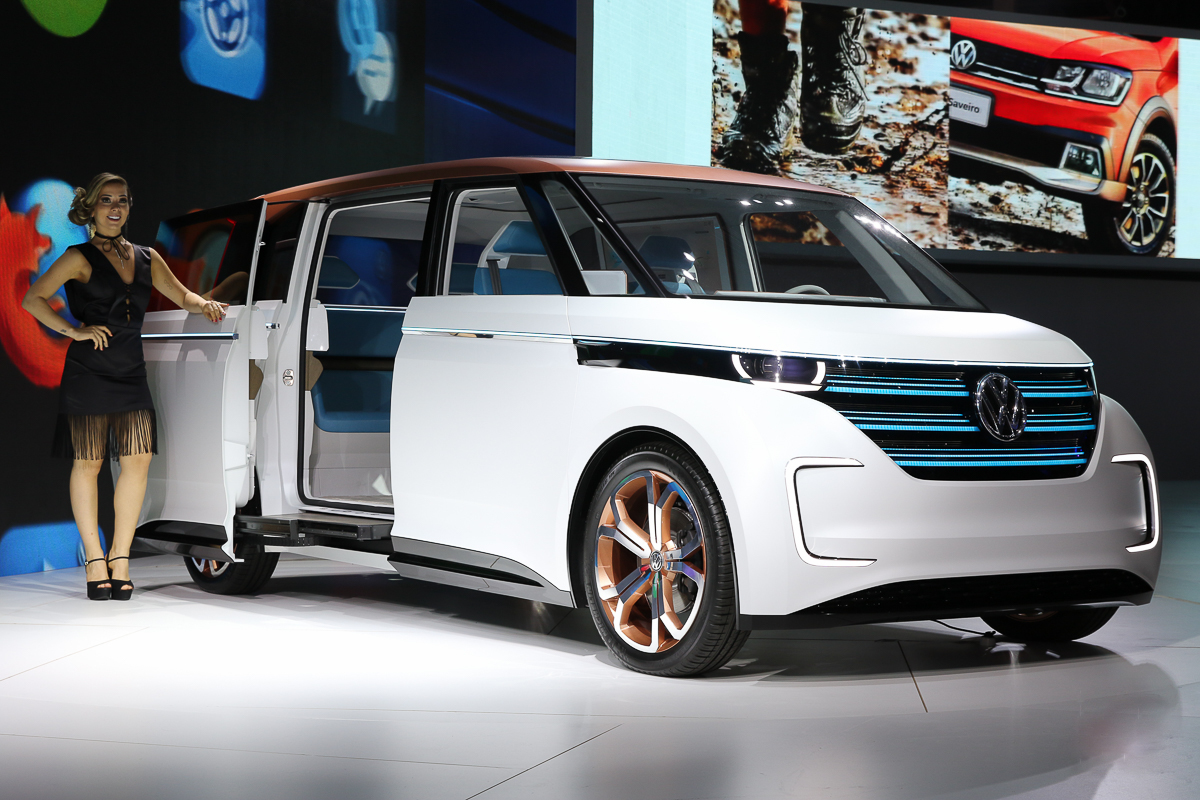
- BUDD-e

Overview
- Manufacturer: Volkswagen

Body and chassis
- Body style: minivan
- Platform: VW MEB

Dimensions
- Length: 4,600 mm (181 in)

Chronology
- Predecessor: Volkswagen Bulli
- Successor: Volkswagen I.D. Buzz

Volkswagen announced that it was developing an all-electric platform in October 2015, as part of its response to the diesel emissions scandal. The platform was eventually named the MEB platform. The BUDD-e was revealed on January 5, 2016, at the Consumer Electronics Show, as the first concept based on the forthcoming MEB platform. That was the day after the United States Department of Justice filed suit against Volkswagen AG for its role in the diesel emissions scandal.

Like the earlier Bulli concept of 2011, the BUDD-e used two rows of seating. The 101 kWh (360 MJ) battery in the BUDD-e gave it an estimated range of 233 mi (375 km). The MEB-based BUDD-e used two motors, one each on the front and rear axle for a total mechanical output power of 225 kW (302 hp). It was also fitted with photovoltaic panels in the roof.

=== ID. BUZZ (2017) ===
I.D. BUZZ
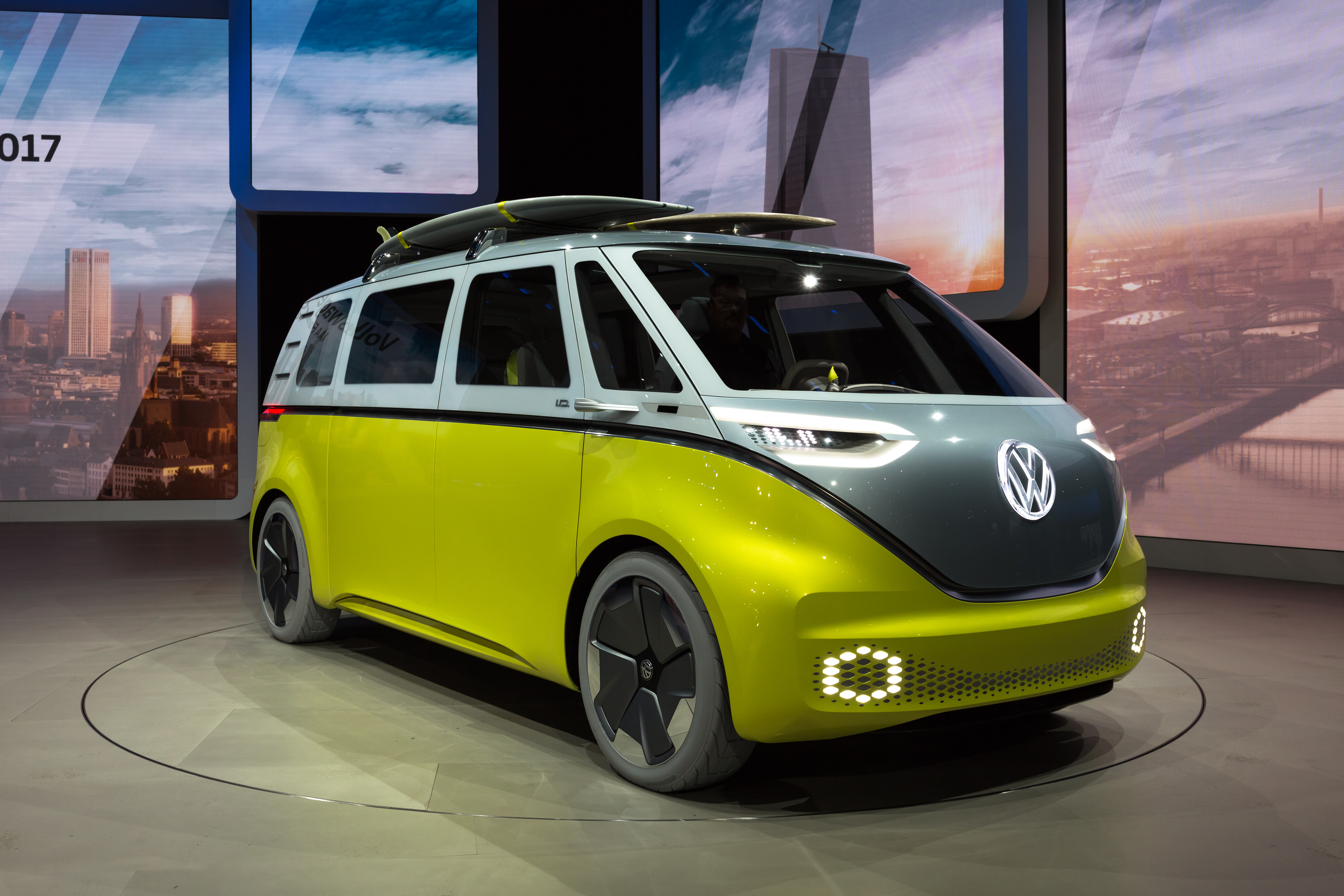
- I.D. Buzz at the IAA 2017

Overview
- Manufacturer: Volkswagen
- Also called: VW electric microbus
- Production: 2022–
- Designer: Einar Castillo

Body and chassis
- Body style: 3 and 4 door minivan
- Platform: VW MEB

Dimensions
- Wheelbase: 3,300 mm (130 in)
- Length: 4,942 mm (195 in)
- Width: 1,976 mm (78 in)
- Height: 1,963 mm (77 in)

Chronology
- Predecessor: Volkswagen BUDD-e

The Volkswagen ID. Buzz debuted at the January 2017 North American International Auto Show in Detroit. It was also based on the MEB platform. Unlike the Bulli and BUDD-e, the ID. Buzz featured three rows of seating.
