= Volkswagen BUDD-e =

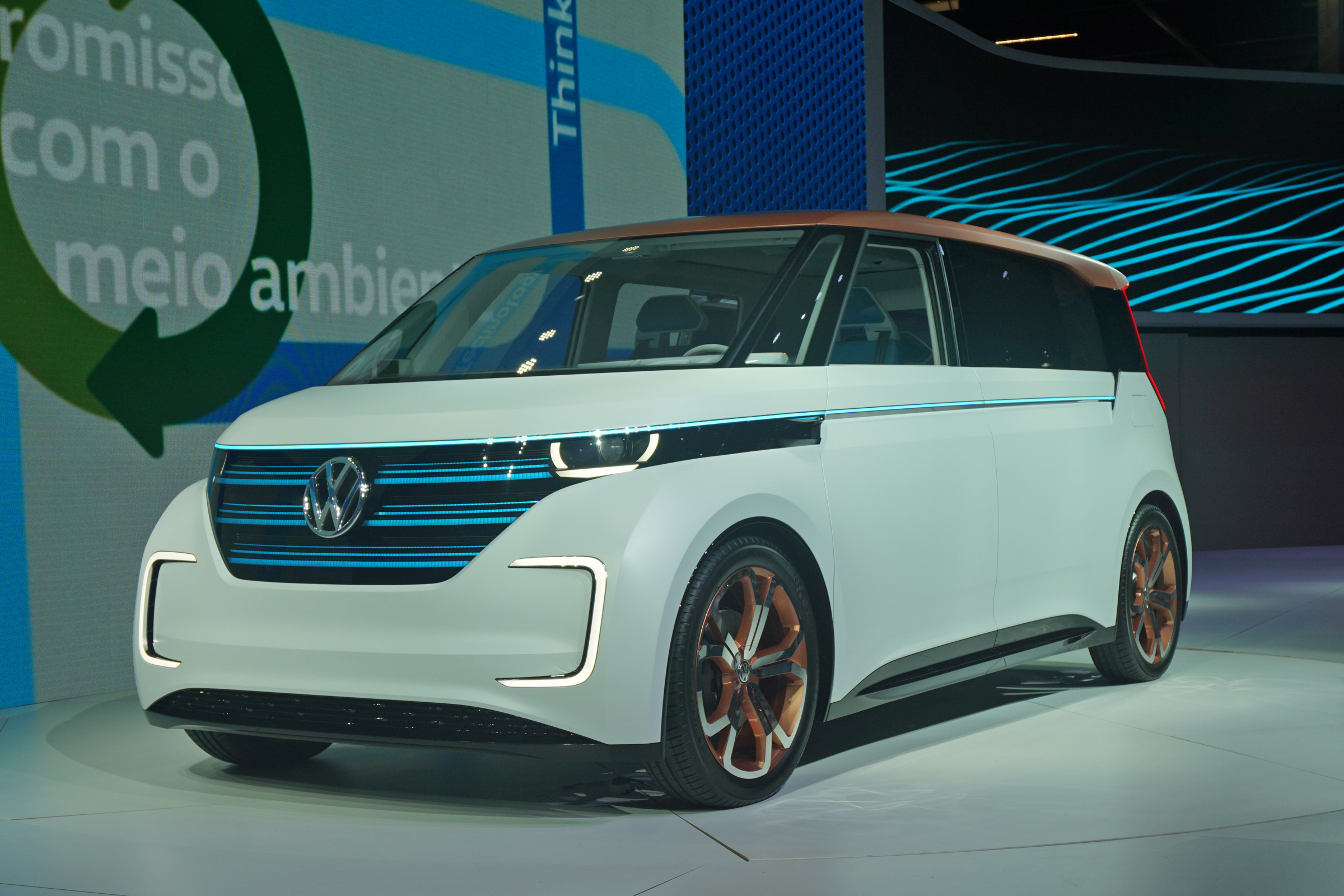
- Volkswagen BUDD-e Concept (2016)

Overview
- Manufacturer: Volkswagen

Dimensions
- Wheelbase: 3,152 mm (124.1 in)
- Length: 4,597 mm (181 in)
- Width: 1,938 mm (76.3 in)
- Height: 1,834 mm (72.2 in)

Chronology
- Predecessor: Volkswagen Bulli
- Successor: Volkswagen I.D. Buzz

The Volkswagen BUDD-e is an electric concept car made by German car manufacturer Volkswagen. The BUDD-e has been often compared to the Volkswagen Microbus.

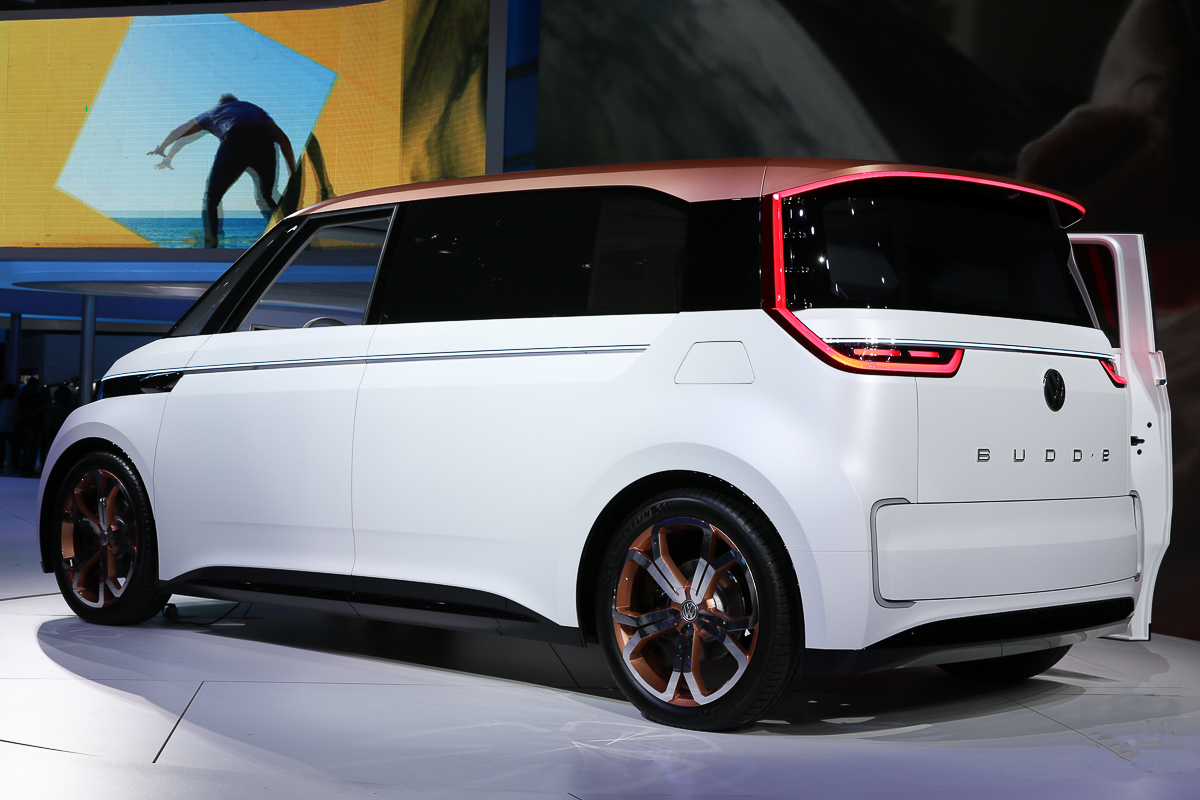
Rear view

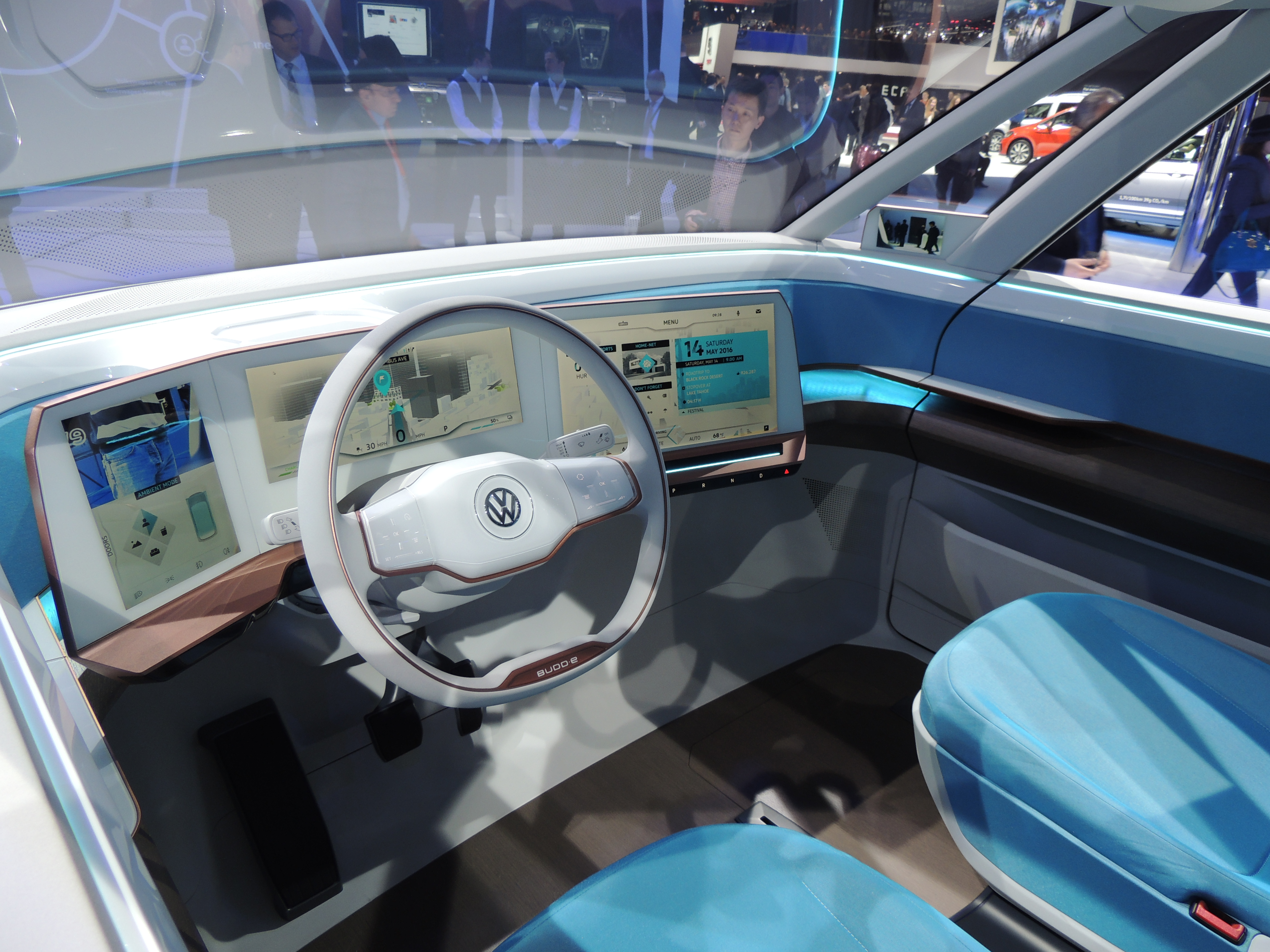
Interior view

The BUDD-e was first shown at the 2016 Consumer Electronics Show; Volkswagen stated that it would be released around 2020, though this appears to have been put back to 2023. The BUDD-e was intended to feature touch, voice, and gesture control, as well as digital displays called E-Mirrors instead of the usual side mirrors.

== See also ==
- Microvan
- Volkswagen I.D. Buzz
- Volkswagen Microbus/Bulli concept vehicles
