= The Buzz =

The Buzz may refer to:

- The Buzz (Marvel Comics), a fictional character in the Marvel Comics' series Spider-Girl
- The Buzz (talk show), a television entertainment news and talk show in the Philippines (known as Buzz ng Bayan since 2013, but later was reverted to its original name in the 2nd quarter of 2014)
- KFNZ-FM, a Kansas City radio station formerly known as "The Buzz"
- KTBZ-FM, a Houston radio station known as "The Buzz"
- WBUZ-FM, a Nashville, Tennessee radio station also known as "The Buzz"
- WSBU-FM, a college radio station at St. Bonaventure, NY known as "The Buzz"
- WBTZ, an FM alternative rock radio station broadcasting from Plattsburgh, NY known as "99.9 The Buzz"
- WIRK, an FM radio station in West Palm Beach, FL formerly known as "The Buzz"
- The Buzz (Australian radio show)
- The Buzz, a Boston Bruins Top 10 countdown on New England Sports Network
- A London band backing David Bowie on the 1966 singles "Do Anything You Say" and "I Dig Everything"
- The Buzz (film), a 1992 film directed by Hart Bochner
- "The Buzz", a 2014 song by New World Sound.
- Peter Bosustow (born 1957), Australian rules footballer known as "The Buzz"
- Da Buzz, Swedish band
- Buzz (TV series), often known as The Buzz, Canadian TV series

== See also ==
- Buzz (disambiguation)
