= Buzzy Boop at the Concert =

- Directed by: Dave Fleischer; Animation Direction: Thomas Johnson (uncredited)
- Produced by: Max Fleischer
- Starring: Margie Hines; Jack Mercer
- Music by: Sammy Timberg (uncredited)
- Animation by: Thomas Johnson; Harold Walker; Uncredited Animation: Frank Endres; Otto Feuer; Lod Rossner
- Color process: Black-and-white
- Production company: Fleischer Studios
- Distributed by: Paramount Pictures
- Release date: September 16, 1938
- Running time: 7 minutes
- Language: English

Buzzy Boop at the Concert is a 1938 Betty Boop film starring Betty's young tomboy cousin Buzzy Boop. It was directed by Dave Fleischer and Thomas Johnson and was released on September 16, 1938.

For years, it was considered a lost film, until a copy resurfaced in Russia in 2019. The film was subsequently restored by the UCLA Film & Television Archive and uploaded to their official YouTube channel.

== Plot ==
Betty Boop takes her reluctant cousin Buzzy to a concert hall to watch a live music recital starring the opera singer Madame Shrill, nicknamed the Soprano Supreme. As she performs the song "The Last Rose of Summer" onstage, the uneventful nature of the concert puts the orchestra, the piano player, and the audience (Betty included) to sleep.

Buzzy, in an attempt to liven up the concert, comes up to the stage and convinces Shrill to change her opera recital into a dance-filled performance accompanied by swing music. This successfully turns the situation around as the cartoon ends with Betty and the rest of the audience giving a thunderous applause to Buzzy and Shrill's performance in the concert.

== Notes ==
- Beginning with this film, Betty's appearance was updated to have a more human-like head and a taller body. This was likely done to distance and modernize the character from her previous flapper-like image as seen in previous short films.

== Preservation ==
Buzzy Boop at the Concert was considered a lost film for decades, until an English copy of the film was found in Russia in 2019. It was soon preserved and restored by the UCLA Film and Television Archive. The restoration's funding was provided by ASIFA-Hollywood in collaboration with the Packard Humanities Institute. The restoration premiered at the UCLA Festival of Preservation in 2022.
