= Buzz (nickname) =

Buzz is a nickname. Notable people with the name include:

- Buzz Aldrin (born 1930), American pilot and astronaut, second person to set foot on the Moon
- Herbert Altshuler (born 1945), American retired major general
- Buzz Arlett (1899–1964), American baseball player
- James D. Beans (born 1934), United States Marine Corps brigadier general
- George Beurling (1921–1948), Canadian World War II fighter pilot
- A. I. Bezzerides, (1908–2007), Greek-American novelist and screenwriter
- Buzz Bissinger (born 1954), American Pulitzer Prize-winning journalist and author
- Buzz Burrell (born 1951) American ultrarunner
- Ian Burrows (1930–2006), New Zealand brigadier general and Commander of Land Forces New Zealand
- Steve Busby (born 1949), American baseball pitcher
- Beau Casson (born 1982), Australian former cricketer
- Buzz Clifford (1941–2018), American singer
- Charlie Eckert (1897–1986), American baseball pitcher
- Buzz Fazio (1908–1993), American bowler
- Buzz Feiten, American singer, songwriter and guitarist
- Buzz Gardner (1931–2004), American trumpeter
- Buzz Grogan, a professional wrestler with NWA All-Star Wrestling
- Buzz Hargrove (1944–2025), national president of the Canadian Auto Workers trade union
- John McClung (1935–2004), Canadian historian, lawyer, jurist and judge
- Buzz Nutter (1931–2008), American football player
- Buzz Osborne (born 1964), guitarist/vocalist/songwriter, founding member of The Melvins
- Buzz Parsons (born 1950), Canadian former soccer player
- Buzz Peterson (born 1963), American basketball player, coach and executive
- Buzz Sawyer, ring name of professional wrestler Bruce Woyan (1959–1992)
- Buzz Schneider (born 1954), American ice hockey player and Olympic gold medalist
- Boyd Wagner (1918–1942), American World War II flying ace and lieutenant colonel
- Buzz Williams (born 1972), American college men's basketball head coach at The University of Maryland
- Raymond R. Wright (1945–1999), US Army soldier and Medal of Honor recipient

== See also ==
- Buzzy (disambiguation), includes a list of people with name Buzzy
