= Buz =

Buz or BUZ may refer to:

- Buz, Albania, a village in Gjirokastër County
- Buz, Iran, a village in Khuzestan Province
- nickname of William A. Brock (born 1941), American mathematical economist and professor
- Buz, son of Nahor and Milcah, a minor Biblical character
- Buz, an ancient tribe mentioned in Jeremiah 25:23
- the title character of Buz Sawyer, an American comic strip published from 1943 to 1989
- BUZ, the IATA code for Bushehr Airport, Iran
- Bus upgrade zone (BUZ) in Brisbane, Australia

== See also ==
- Buzz (disambiguation)
