= Buzz (dinghy) =

UK sailing dinghy designed in 1994

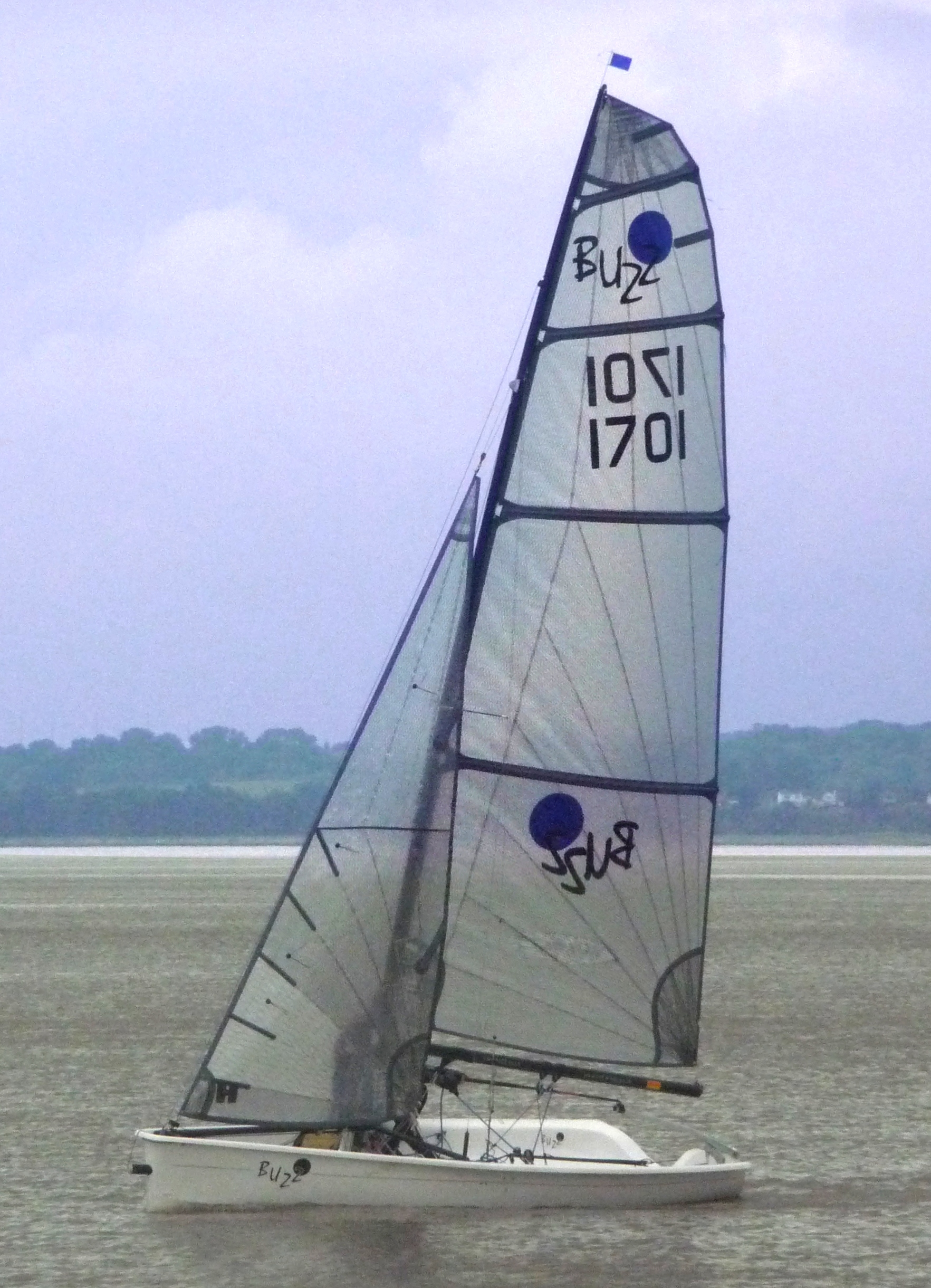
- A Buzz (singled-crewed).

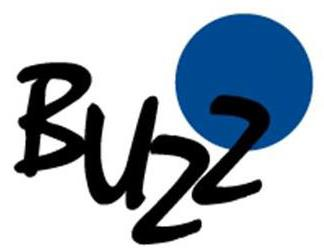

Boat
- Crew: 2

Hull
- Hull weight: 90 kg (200 lb)
- LOA: 4.20 m (13 ft 9 in)
- Beam: 1.92 m (6 ft 4 in)

Sails
- Spinnaker area: 17.4 m^{2} (187 ft^{2}).
- Upwind sail area: 12.85 m^{2} (138.3 ft^{2}).

Racing
- D-PN: 80.5
- RYA PN: 1030

The Buzz is a sailing dinghy designed in 1994 by Ian Howlett and John Caig and manufactured by Reg White Limited of Brightlingsea as part of the "White Formula" range of boats originally marketed by Topper International Ltd but since 2013 by Vantage Sailing. The Buzz is a double handed racing boat, with a single trapeze for the crewman. The boat has a fully battened mainsail, furling jib and an asymmetrical spinnaker. There have been around 500 boats built. The Buzz is designed to be an easy to sail boat, but it can also be raced competitively.

== Performance ==
The Buzz is similar to the ISO racing dinghy, it is scaled down version of the larger boat, being 10 kg lighter and with a smaller sail area of 12.85m², compared to the ISO's 14.74m². However, unlike the ISO the Buzz does not have the option of wings to assist the righting moment for shorter or lighter crews.

The Buzz can be an exhilarating boat to sail and is claimed to be a safe starting point for asymmetric skiff sailing. The boat also has good performance, making it suitable for racing by more experienced crews. The Buzz has proven itself to be easy to right after capsizing, and it is straightforward to re-board the boat from the water, partly due to its low centre of buoyancy and self draining cockpit with its open transom. The open transom also means that the boat drains quickly on righting doing away with the need for self bailers.

The Buzz can be sailed by a wide age range; in the UK National Championships for Buzz's the crews who won the individual races varied greatly in weight, proving that the Buzz offers opportunity to sailors of all ages and weight. The Buzz has a beam of nearly two metres, giving it a very large width, which means that it is easily accessible to older or larger sailors.
