= Buzzy Boop =

Buzzy Boop (originally untitled)
- Directed by: Dave Fleischer
- Produced by: Max Fleischer
- Starring: Little Ann Little (Betty Boop); Bonnie Poe (Buzzy Boop)
- Animation by: Animated by: David Tendlar and William Sturm; Thomas Johnson (uncredited)
- Color process: Black-and-white
- Production company: Fleischer Studios
- Distributed by: Paramount Pictures
- Release date: July 29, 1938
- Running time: 7 mins
- Language: English

Buzzy Boop (originally untitled) is a 1938 Fleischer Studios animated short film in the Max Fleischer/Betty Boop Cartoon featuring Betty Boop and her young tomboy cousin Buzzy Boop.

== Plot ==
Betty Boop's tomboyish young cousin, Buzzy, takes the train to visit Betty. While riding the train, she is "helpful" to other passengers in a mischievous kind of way. She uses her chewing gum to stick on a sleeping man's toupee, and waters the flowers in a lady's hat.

At Betty's house, Buzzy meets up with a bunch of rough boys next door, who are playing marbles. She tries to join in. She proves better than the boys at tricks like balancing on a fence, and even fares well when the boys unleash a goat to fight with her. Only then is she considered "one of the guys!"

== Notes ==
Buzzy Boop makes another appearance in Buzzy Boop at the Concert. For many years, the cartoon was lost. Buzzy Boop at the Concert was discovered in Moscow and was repatriated and restored by the UCLA Film & Television Archives in 2019, with the support of ASIFA-Hollywood.
