= ISO (dinghy) =

ISAF class of two-person sailing dinghy

Boat
- Crew: 2 (single trapeze)

Hull
- Hull weight: 100 kg (220 lb)
- LOA: 4,740 mm (15 ft 7 in)
- Beam: 1,750–2,000 mm (5 ft 9 in – 6 ft 7 in)

Sails
- Spinnaker area: 18.8 m^{2} (202 sq ft)
- Upwind sail area: 14.3 m^{2} (154 ft^{2}).

Racing
- RYA PN: 928

ISO is an International Sailing Federation (ISAF) class of two-person sailing dinghy with a single trapeze and an asymmetric spinnaker. The ISO was designed in 1993 by Ian Howlett and John Caig and manufactured by Reg White Limited of Brightlingsea as part of the "White Formula" range of boats originally marketed by Topper International Ltd and since 2013 by Vantage Sailing Ltd. The boat has a fully battened mainsail, jib and an asymmetric spinnaker.

The name ISO reflects a feature of the design that allows different sized crews to compete on an equal basis. This is achieved by a crew weight equalisation system consisting of removable wings. The wings may not be used if the trapezing crew weighs more than 78 kg (to equalise righting moment) and must be used if the combined helm and crew weight is less than 135 kg (to equalise weight in the boat). If neither of these mandatory rules apply the crew may choose whether to use wings but may not change this decision during a race series.

Around 700 boats have been built with sail numbers starting at 501. The ISO is designed to be a relatively easy boat to sail for its performance level. It belongs to the racing skiff category. In the UK the ISO Class Association is affiliated to the Royal Yachting Association (RYA).
