= Buzy =

Buzy may refer to:

== Geography ==
- Buzy, Pyrénées-Atlantiques, France
- Gare de Buzy, railway station Buzy, Pyrénées-Atlantiques, France
- Buzy-Darmont, Meuse, France

== Music ==
- Buzy (singer) (1957–2023), French singer
- Buzy (band), Japanese girl band
