= Bruzzese =

Bruzzese is an Italian surname. Notable people with the surname include:

- Sébastien Bruzzese (born 1989), Belgian footballer
- Carmelo Bruzzese (born 1949), Italian-Canadian mobster
