= Volkswagen ID. Buzz =

Battery electric minivan

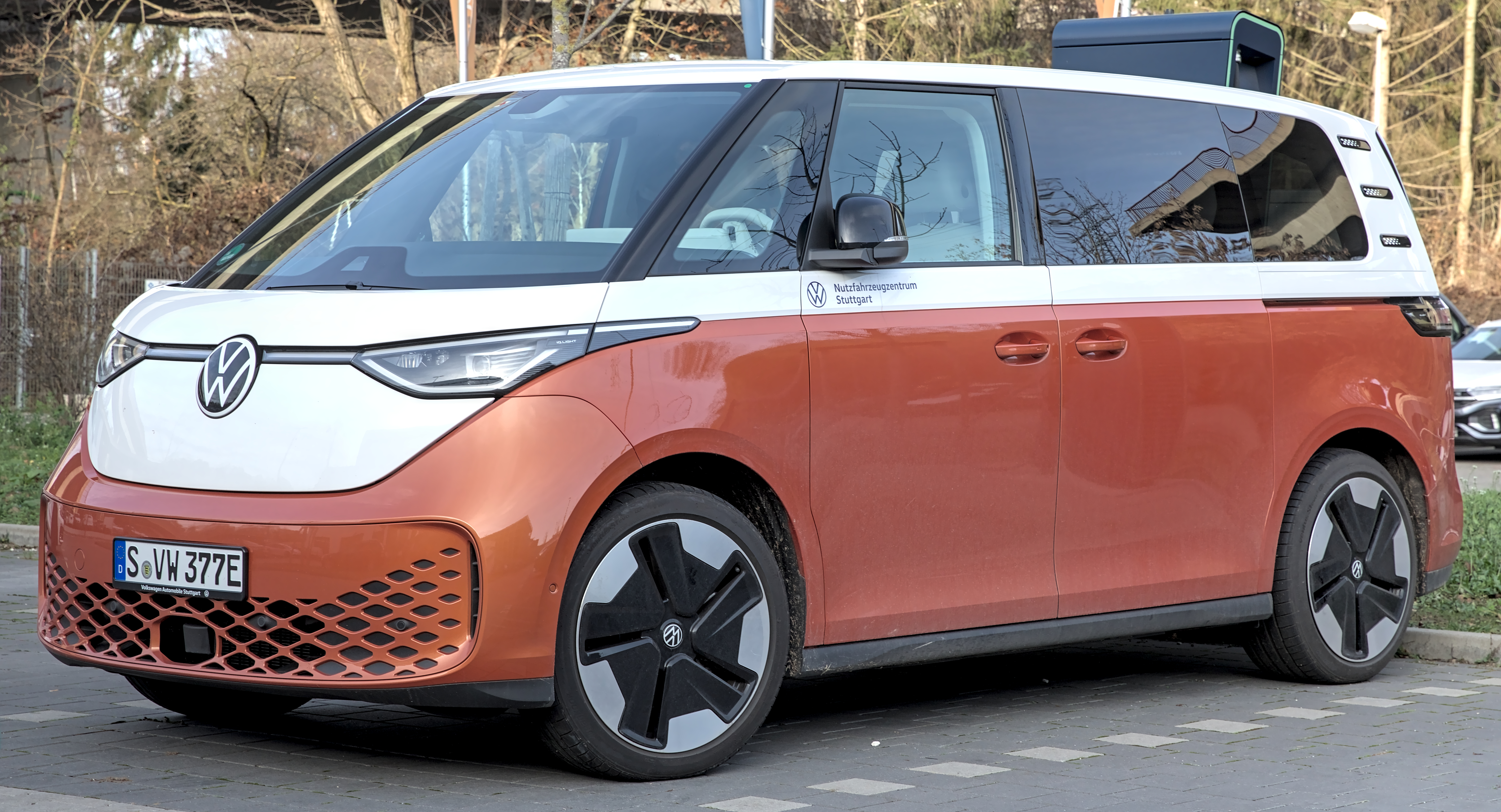

Overview
- Manufacturer: Volkswagen
- Production: June 2022 – present
- Model years: 2025, 2027-present (North America)
- Assembly: Hanover, Germany
- Designer: Einar Castillo under Klaus Zyciora

Body and chassis
- Class: Minivan; Light commercial vehicle
- Body style: 5-door minivan / panel van
- Platform: Volkswagen Group MEB

Powertrain
- Electric motor: APP 310 permanent magnet brushless motor; APP 550 permanent magnet brushless motor
- Power output: 150 kW; 204 PS; 201 hp (RWD); 210 kW; 286 PS; 282 hp (LWB; RWD); 250 kW; 340 PS; 335 hp (GTX; 4WD)
- Battery: 82 kWh lithium-ion (RWD; 77 usable)

Dimensions
- Wheelbase: 2,988 mm (117.6 in) (SWB); 3,238 mm (127.5 in) (LWB)
- Length: 4,712 mm (185.5 in) (SWB); 4,962 mm (195.4 in) (LWB)
- Width: 1,985 mm (78.1 in)
- Height: 1,937 mm (76.3 in)
- Curb weight: 2,459 kg (5,421 lb)

The Volkswagen ID. Buzz is a battery electric minivan produced by German manufacturer Volkswagen. Based on the dedicated battery electric MEB platform, it is the first production electric minivan from Volkswagen and part of the Volkswagen ID. series. A retro styled minivan, the design of the ID. Buzz is inspired by the Volkswagen Type 2 (T1) Microbus.

The vehicle was first shown as a concept car at the 2017 North American International Auto Show. The production vehicle was unveiled in March 2022 with production starting in June, and European deliveries in the second half of the year with two models: a five-seater under the name ID. Buzz, and a cargo van as the ID. Buzz Cargo. The U.S. production version had its North American launch in Huntington Beach, California, on 2 June 2023, and became available in June 2024 in a long-wheelbase version. This version will also be used for the California campervan variant of the ID. Buzz.

Also a reference to the sound of electricity, the name "Buzz" was derived from the word bus, as the original Volkswagen Type 2/Microbus is commonly known simply as the "Volkswagen Bus".

== Overview ==
Responding to positive feedback and strong consumer interest for the ID. Buzz Concept shown at Detroit and Geneva in 2017, CEO Herbert Diess announced in August that VW would put the vehicle into production, with sales beginning in 2022.

The production version of the ID. Buzz debuted on 9 March 2022. It is one of nine new Volkswagen brand models based on the MEB platform. The ID. Buzz will be available in Europe the second half of 2022, and the US in 2024. Pre-orders in Europe began in May. Series production started in June, with an annual capacity of 130,000 units. The first deliveries were scheduled for the third quarter of 2022; the first ID. Buzz off the production line was a Cargo model, delivered to Wolfgang Kempe GmbH in Isernhagen on 15 November 2022.

The ID. Buzz is produced by Volkswagen Commercial Vehicles in Hanover; because prior ID. series vehicles have been built at the Volkswagen Zwickau-Mosel Plant, the Hanover factory needed to be retooled to accommodate EV assembly. Although the Volkswagen Chattanooga Assembly Plant began building the MEB-based ID.4 in 2021 for the US market, Volkswagen Group of America CEO Scott Keogh stated in January 2022 that bringing production of US ID. Buzz models to Chattanooga is unlikely.

In Europe, it launched in two configurations, a five-seater passenger van, and a cargo van; initially, a short-wheelbase version with rear-wheel drive was available. A seven-passenger, long-wheelbase version debuted on June 2, 2023, in Huntington Beach, California, and was the only version for sale in the US when it went on sale in June 2024 for the 2025 model year. In December 2025, Volkswagen Group of America CEO Kjell Gruner announced VW would withdraw the ID.Buzz from the U.S. market for the 2026 model year, but that it would return for the 2027 model year. In Indonesia, The ID. Buzz was launched at 2024 GIIAS as a short wheelbase version, a long wheelbase versions was launched at 2025 IIMS. The ID. Buzz was launched in Australasia in early 2025 (ahead of the first Australian deliveries of the ID.4 which occurred in mid-2025).

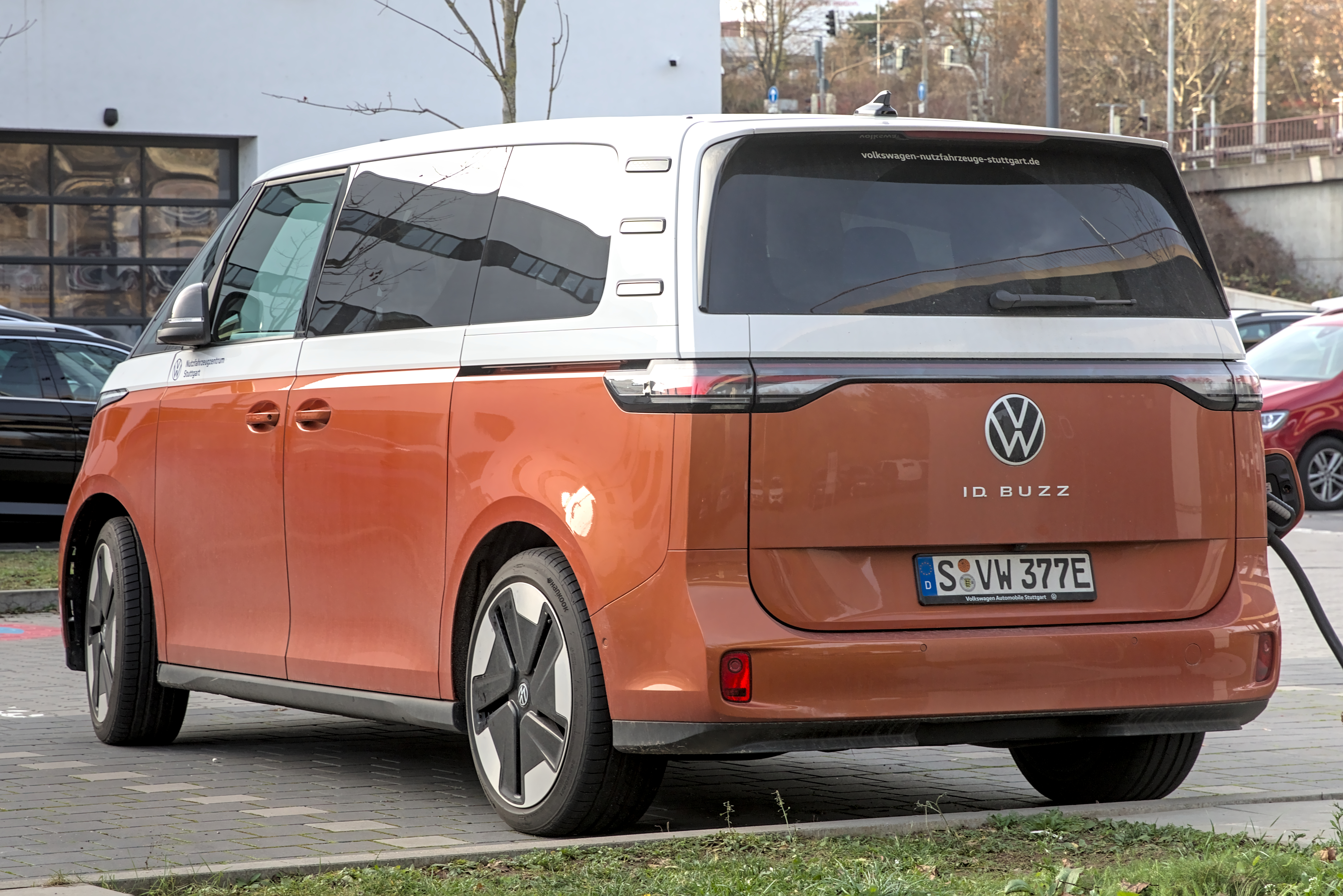
Rear view

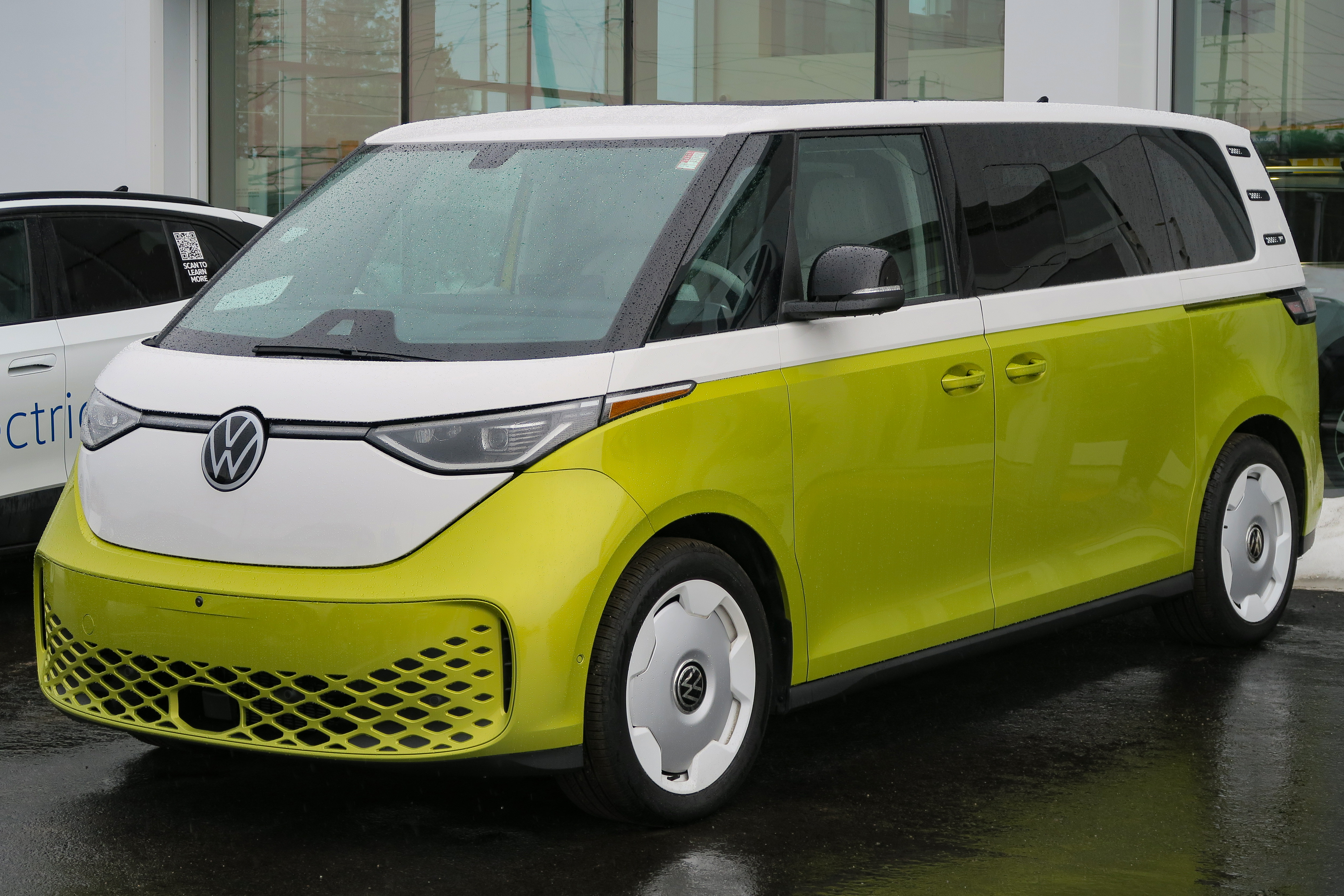
Volkswagen ID. Buzz LWB

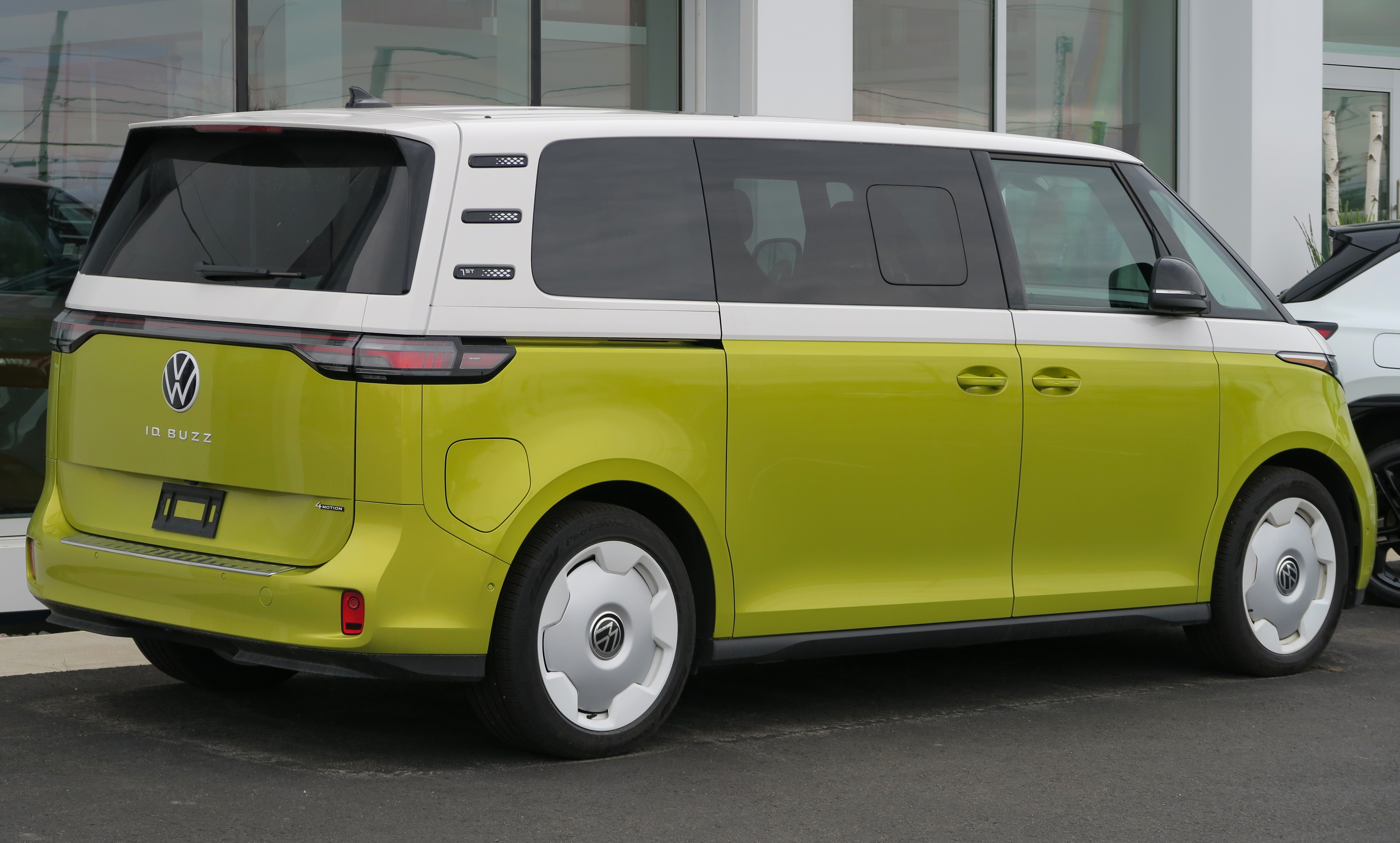
Rear view

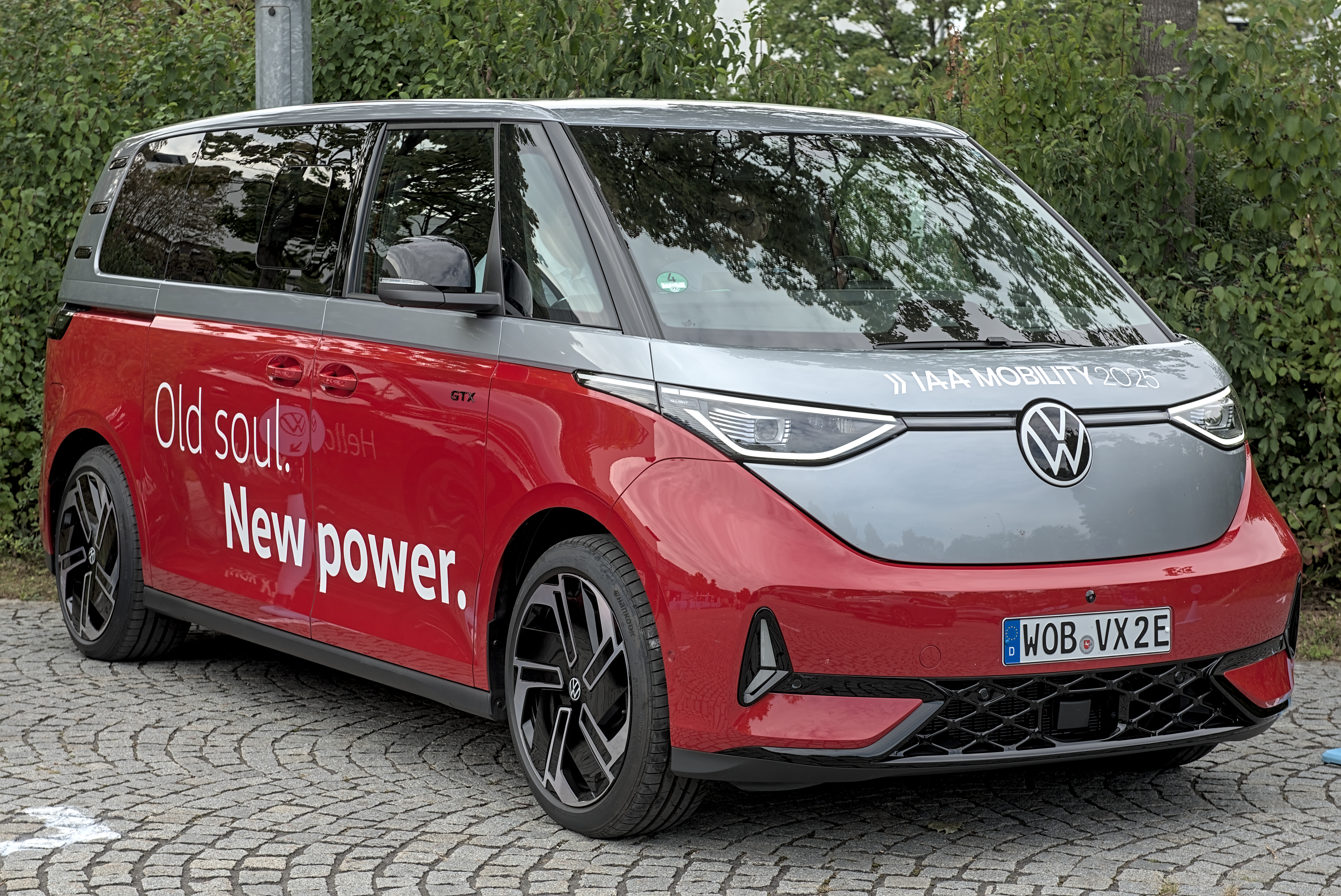
Volkswagen ID. Buzz GTX

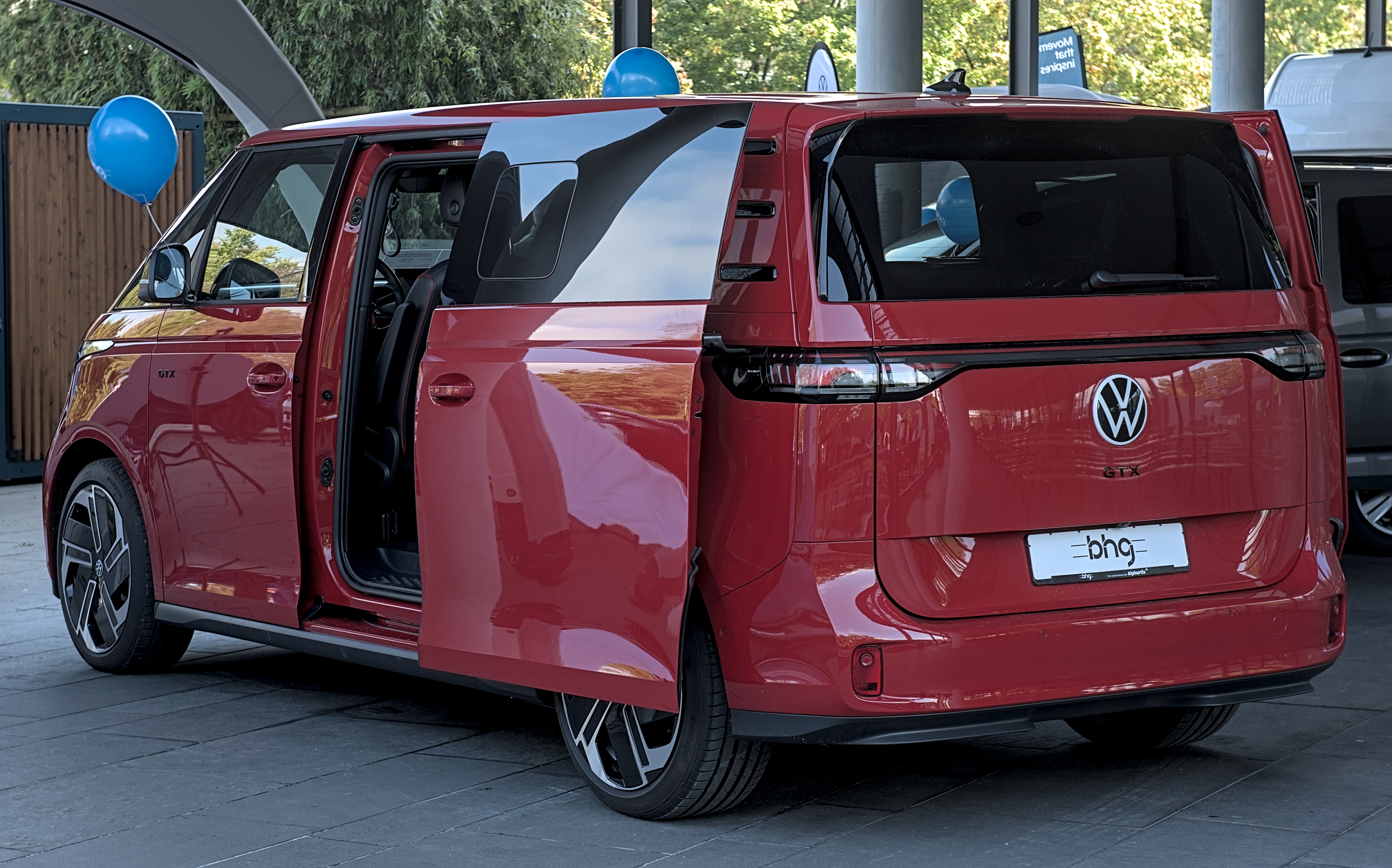
Rear view

== Design ==
According to product lead Jeffrey Lear, the styling of the ID. Buzz was chosen to "be modern and fresh and exciting for folks who may not have even been around [during the 1960s and 70s]" while retaining cues to the original Type 2 (T1)/Microbus, including the prominent front-mounted logo and (optional) two-tone paint.

The designer of the ID.Buzz is Klaus Zyciora, Head of Volkswagen Group Design. The coefficient of drag is 0.285 for the SWB passenger version and 0.29 for the Cargo.

=== Dimensions ===
At 2,988 mm (117.6 in), the wheelbase of the ID. Buzz (SWB) is similar to that of the current Volkswagen Transporter (T6); it is 81 mm (3.2 in) wider than the T6 and features a turning circle of 11.1 m (36 ft), which is approximately the same as a Golf.

The long wheelbase version of the ID. Buzz stretches overall length by 250 mm (9.8 in) to 3,238 and 4,962 mm (127.5 and 195.4 in), respectively; US-spec ID. Buzz (LWB) have the same wheelbase but are slightly shorter, at 4,887 mm (192.4 in). The ID. Buzz (LWB) has three rows of seats and accommodates up to 2,469 L (87.2 ft^{3}) of cargo with the seats folded. Compared to the SWB, the LWB sliding side doors are 190 mm (7.6 in) longer to ease access to the third row.

=== Interior ===
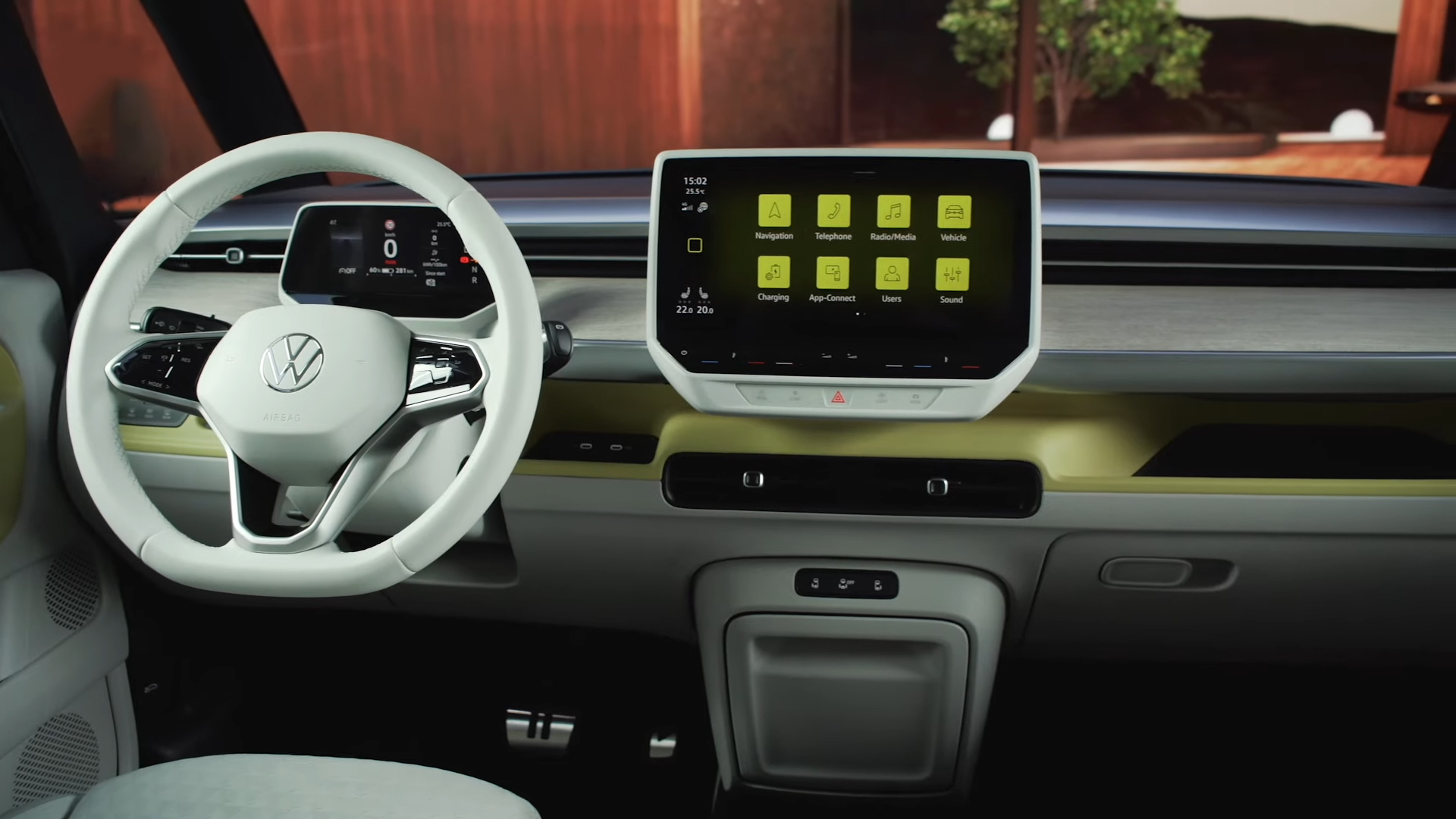
Interior

The SWB/RWD passenger version is equipped with five seats; behind the rear bench seat, there is 1,121 L (39.6 ft^{3}) of cargo area. Three rows of seating will be made available later; for the SWB model, each row will have two seats for a total capacity of six, while on the long-wheelbase (LWB) model, the middle row will accommodate three for a total capacity of seven. With the second row folded down on the five-passenger SWB/RWD model, cargo capacity increases to 2,205 L (77.9 ft^{3}). The ID. Buzz Cargo has two or three seats in the first row only with a fixed partition; behind the partition, the Cargo version has a capacity of 3,900 L (138 ft^{3}).

Seating surfaces use recycled plastics. There is no leather option.

The vehicle's instruments are displayed on a 130 mm (5.3 in) screen. In-car entertainment and climate controls are provided on a second centrally-positioned screen; the standard infotainment screen is 250 mm (10 in), with a 300 mm (12 in) screen as an option. U.S.-spec ID. Buzz (LWB) vans receive a slightly larger 330 mm (12.9 in) screen shared with the ID. 7. The vehicle is equipped with up to eight USB ports.

=== Powertrain ===
The short-wheelbase (SWB) version is equipped with rear-axle APP 310 motor with an output of 150 kW (201 hp) and 310 N⋅m (229 lb⋅ft). The LWB version is available with an upgraded APP 550 traction motor for the rear axle with a peak output of 210 kW (286 hp) and 550 N⋅m (406 lb⋅ft); the increased output results from improvements to the rotor and stator, and the APP 550 also offers improved efficiency thanks to the inverter. An all-wheel-drive version will be made available in 2024 for the LWB with a combined output of 250 kW (339 hp).

The SWB/RWD version has an 81 kW-hr battery, of which 77 kW-hr are usable; the estimated driving range is 400–480 km (250–300 mi). As tested, the SWB/RWD Cargo has a combined energy consumption of 2.93 mi/kWh (99 mpg‑e; 21.2 kWh/100 km), giving an estimated range of 410–413 km (255–257 mi) with the 77 kW-hr battery on the WLTP cycle. LWB versions are equipped with a larger battery, which has a gross and net capacity of 91 and 85 kW-hr, respectively; the estimated maximum range is 406–418 km (252–260 mi) for the EPA driving cycle.

The vehicle can accept power at a rate of up to 11 kW using an AC source, or 170 kW at a DC fast-charging station; at the latter rate, the 81/77 kW-hr battery will charge from 5% to 80% in 30 minutes. It will be capable of bidirectional V2X supply, supplying power to the electrical grid or a household as needed, although this feature is not expected to be implemented for the US model. A future software update is planned to allow Plug & Charge functionality, where the vehicle will authenticate itself at a compatible DC fast-charging station via the ISO 15118 standard.

=== Safety ===
Euro NCAP test results ID.Buzz Pro KR 210 kW 'People' (LHD) (2025)
Test	Points	%
Overall:	5 /5 stars	
Adult occupant:	33.7	84%
Child occupant:	42.0	85%
Pedestrian:	44.6	70%
Safety assist:	13.2	73%

Euro NCAP test results Volkswagen ID.Buzz Cargo (2025)
Test	Score
Overall:	5 /5 stars
Safe driving	77%
Crash avoidance	72%
Post crash	80%

ANCAP test results Volkswagen ID. Buzz Cargo all variants (2024)
Overall
Grading:	80% (Platinum)

== Versions ==
=== Cargo ===
The ID. Buzz Cargo is based on the short wheelbase version with a minimal number of seats and no rear window. The rear of the vehicle, which is separated from the cab by a bulkhead partition, has 3.9 m^{3} (137.7 ft^{3}) of volume and can carry up to two EUR-pallets. Depending on the configuration, the cab can accommodate two (two individual bucket seats) or three (a double bench and a separate bucket for the driver) people.

It has dual sliding side doors and an option between a liftgate (with a window) or dual wing doors (without windows) for the rear. With the liftgate, cargo area length is 2,208 mm (86.9 in); with the wing doors, cargo length is 2,232 mm (87.9 in). Interior height and maximum interior width are 1,330 and 1,217 mm (52.4 and 47.9 in), respectively. Gross vehicle weight rating is 3,000 kg (6,600 lb) and the empty kerb weight is 2,393–2,408 kg (5,276–5,309 lb), depending on trim, giving a payload of 592–607 kg (1,305–1,338 lb).

Euro NCAP awarded the ID Buzz Cargo a Platinum safety rating for commercial vehicles in March 2024. It achieved the highest level in four out of six categories for AEB Car-to-Car, Lane Support Systems, Speed Assist Systems and Occupant Status Monitoring with an overall score of 83%.

Euro NCAP test results ID Buzz (2022)
Test	Points	%
Overall:	5 /5 stars	
Adult occupant:	35.3	92%
Child occupant:	43.0	87%
Pedestrian:	32.9	60%
Safety assist:	14.5	90%

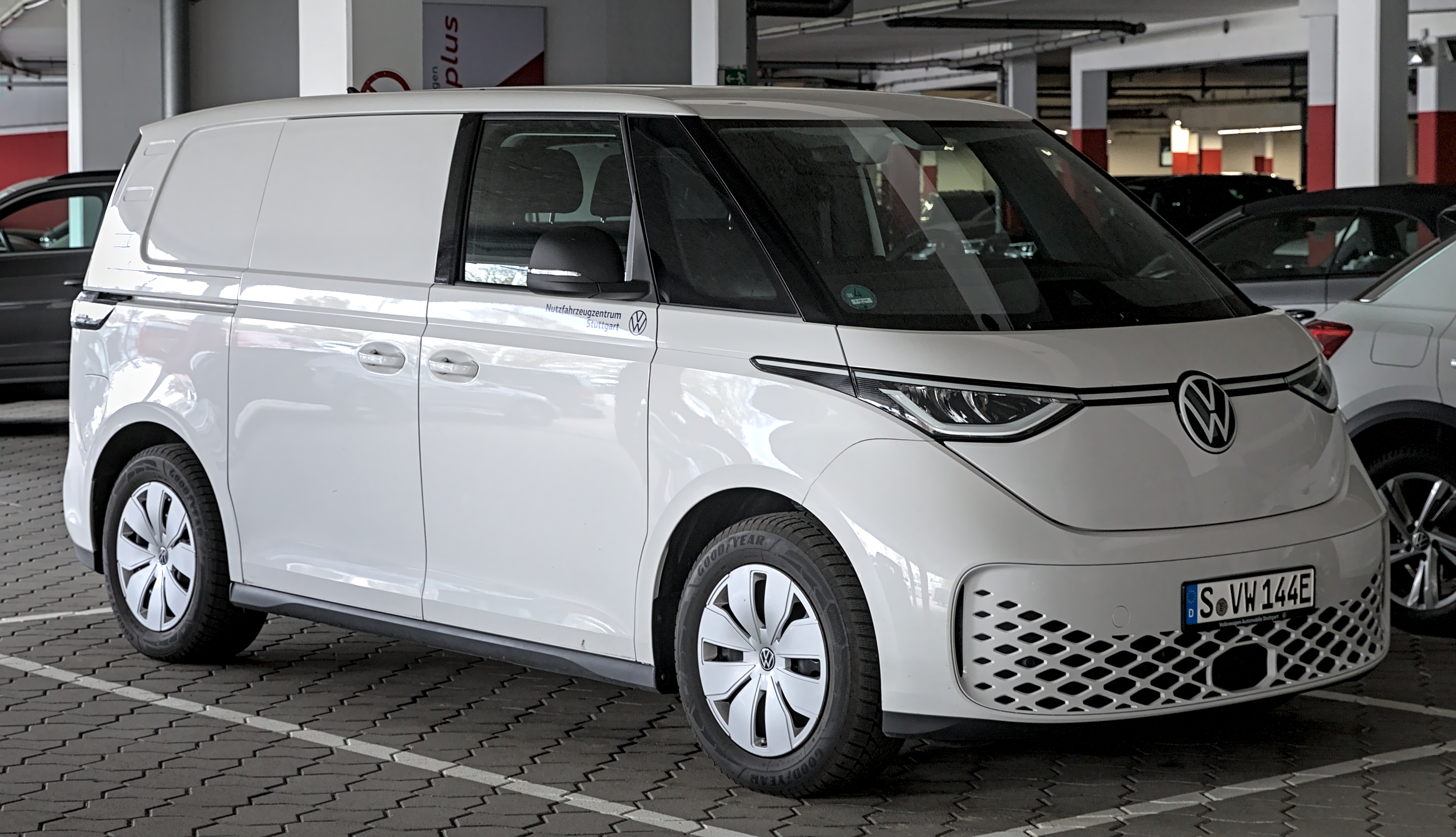
Volkswagen ID. Buzz Cargo

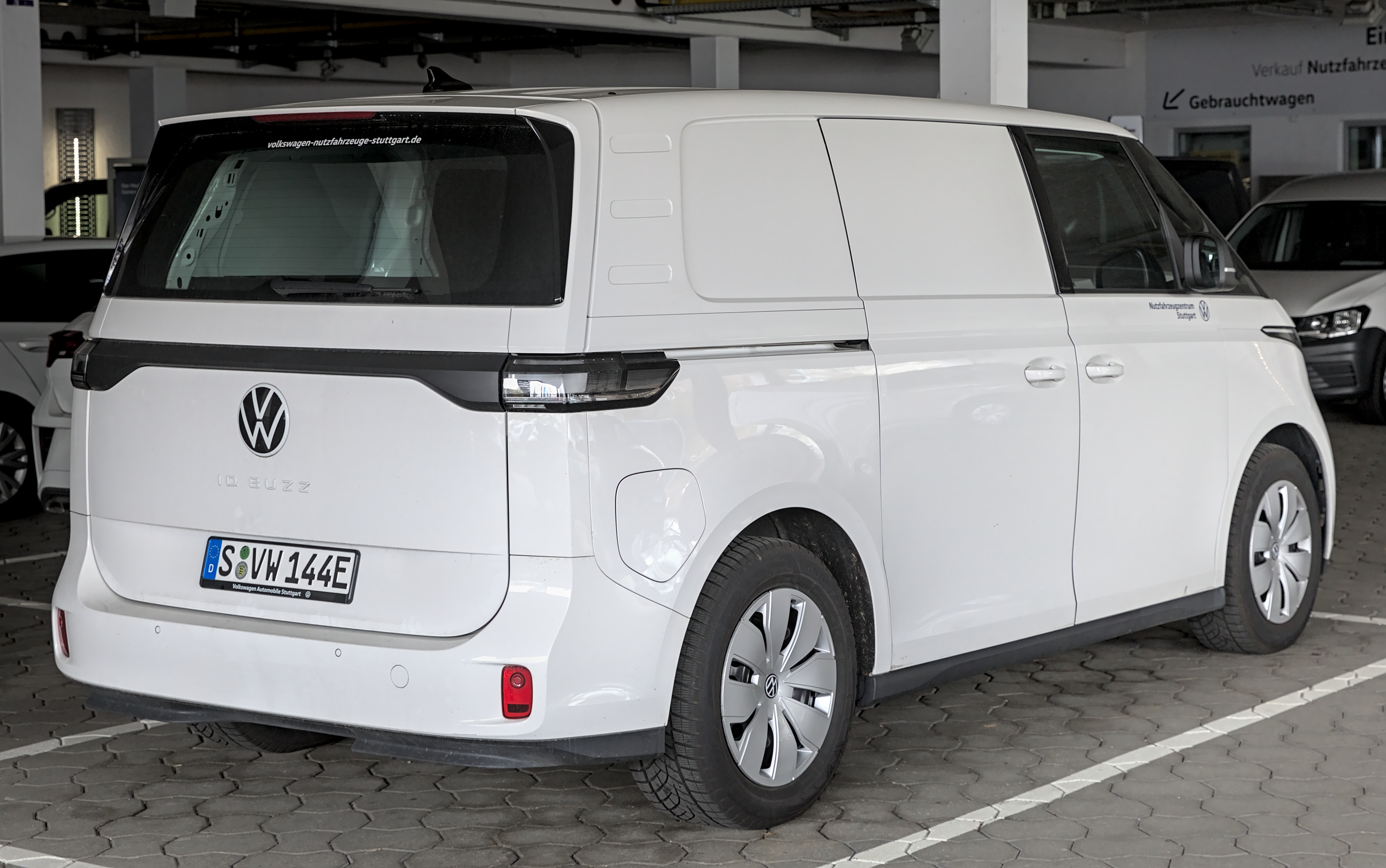
Rear view

== Future development ==
=== ID. California ===
In December 2021, Volkswagen confirmed the ID. Buzz would be used as the basis for a future motorhome version, tentatively named ID. California. In August 2023, Edison Media reported that the project was delayed due to weight concerns.

Instead, VW currently market a T6-based campervan in Europe as the Volkswagen California, and presented a T7 Multivan "California Concept" in August 2023 planned for 2024 and including Hybrid variants.

=== Autonomous driving ===
According to the chief executive of VW Autonomy, Alex Hitzinger, the ID. Buzz minivan is the basis of Volkswagen's self-driving automobile, and could be used for VW's ride-pooling service branded MOIA, competing with Uber. MOIA launched in April 2019, serving Hamburg, Germany, after a 2018 trial with a small fleet of battery electric Multivan T6 vehicles. The autonomous features are part of the "I.D. Pilot" mode, which is anticipated to become available in 2025.

In 2021, late prototype versions of the production ID. Buzz were fitted with autonomous vehicle hardware and software from Argo AI for testing on public roads in Munich and at the company's private test track near the Munich airport. Previously in 2019, VW had invested US$2.6 billion in Argo as part of a partnership with Ford Motor Company to develop autonomous vehicles. On 26 October 2022, with Argo announcing its closure, VW said it would pursue automation technology with Bosch and Horizon Robotics instead.

== Sales ==
Year	Production
2022	11,013
2023	35,272
2024	29,900

== Concept versions ==
Volkswagen ID. BUZZ (concept)
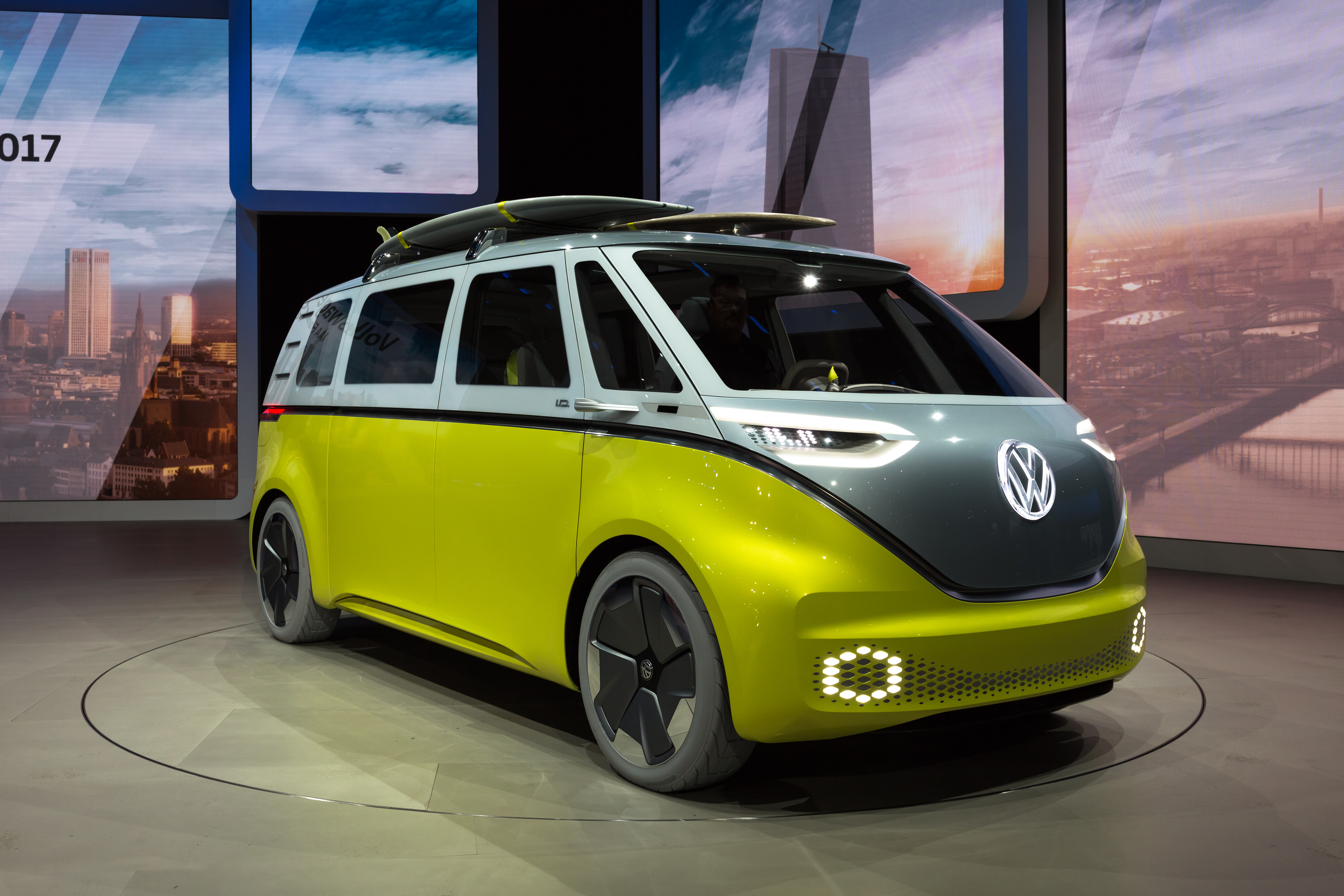
- ID. BUZZ at the IAA 2017

Overview
- Designer: Einar Castillo

Powertrain
- Electric motor: APP 310 permanent magnet brushless motor
- Power output: 200 kW (270 PS; 270 hp) (RWD); 275 kW (374 PS; 369 hp) (4WD)
- Battery: Lithium-ion: 83 kWh (RWD); 111 kWh (4WD)
- Electric range: 435–600 km (270–373 mi)

Dimensions
- Wheelbase: 3,300 mm (129.9 in)
- Length: 4,942 mm (194.6 in)
- Width: 1,976 mm (77.8 in)
- Height: 1,963 mm (77.3 in)

Chronology
- Predecessor: Volkswagen BUDD-e

Concept car descriptions in 2017 indicated the electric microbus could be produced in two versions: a high-end 275 kW (369 hp) all-wheel-drive version with one motor each on the front and rear axles and an 111 kilowatt-hours (400 MJ) battery pack, and a less-expensive 200 kW (268 hp) rear-wheel-drive version with an 83 kWh (300 MJ) battery pack.

=== Cargo variant ===
The I.D. Buzz Cargo (stylized as the ID. BUZZ CARGO) debuted at the 2018 IAA Commercial Vehicles show in Hannover as a support vehicle for the Volkswagen I.D. R Pikes Peak Hillclimb racer. The Cargo has a maximum estimated cargo capacity of 1,760 lb (800 kg) and uses the simplified rear-drive powertrain.

The Cargo prototype was shown in October 2019 at Nike stores in Santa Monica, California; Chicago; and New York City with retro livery branded "Blue Ribbon Sports", the predecessor company to athletic apparel manufacturer Nike, Inc.

The concept vehicle was first shown as a prototype at the 2017 North American International Auto Show in Detroit, then shown again at Geneva in March. Members of the automotive press were invited to drive the concept during Monterey Car Week later that year, in August, where it was also announced that a production vehicle based on this prototype will be launched.

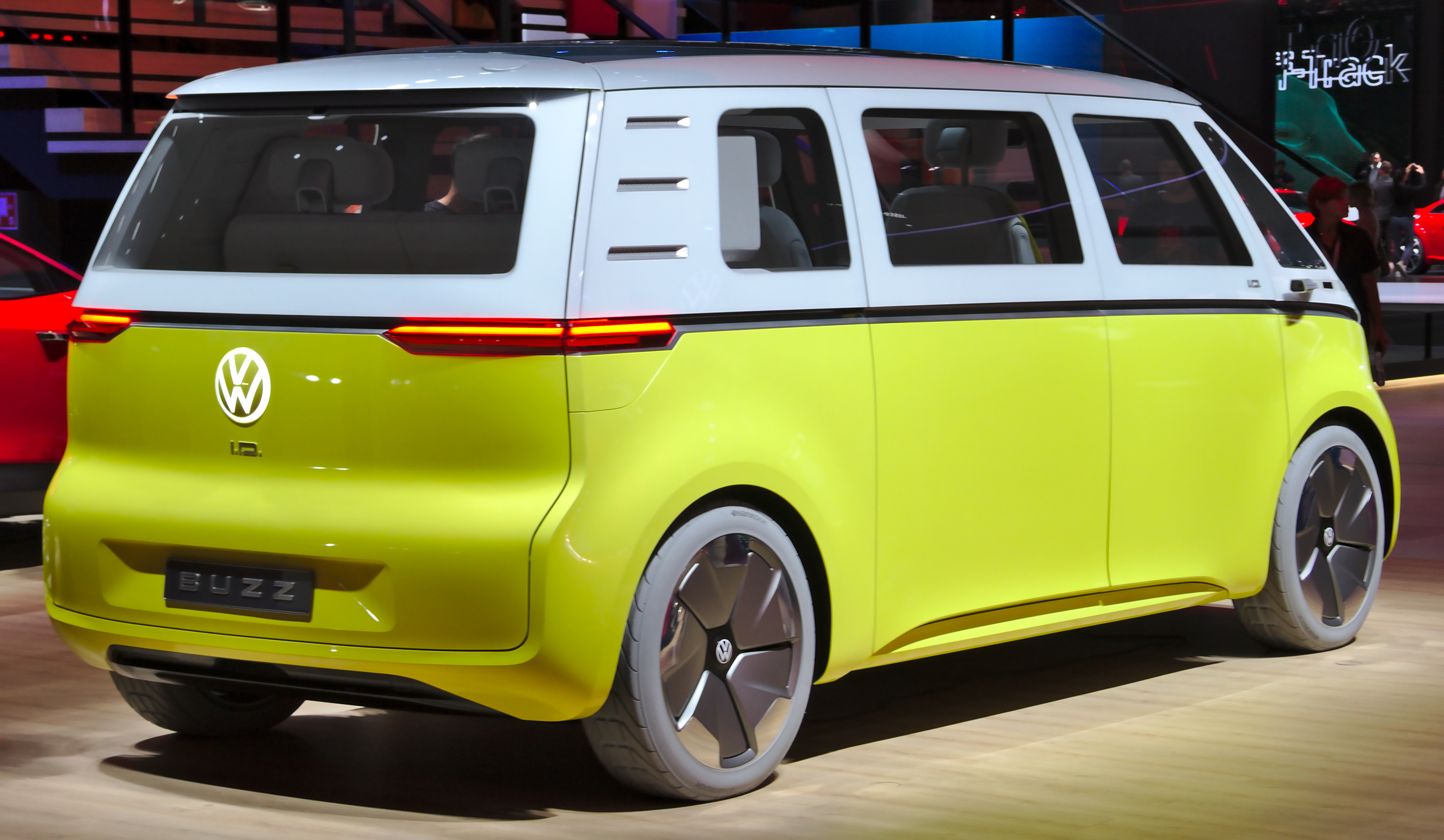
Rear view (IAA, 2019)

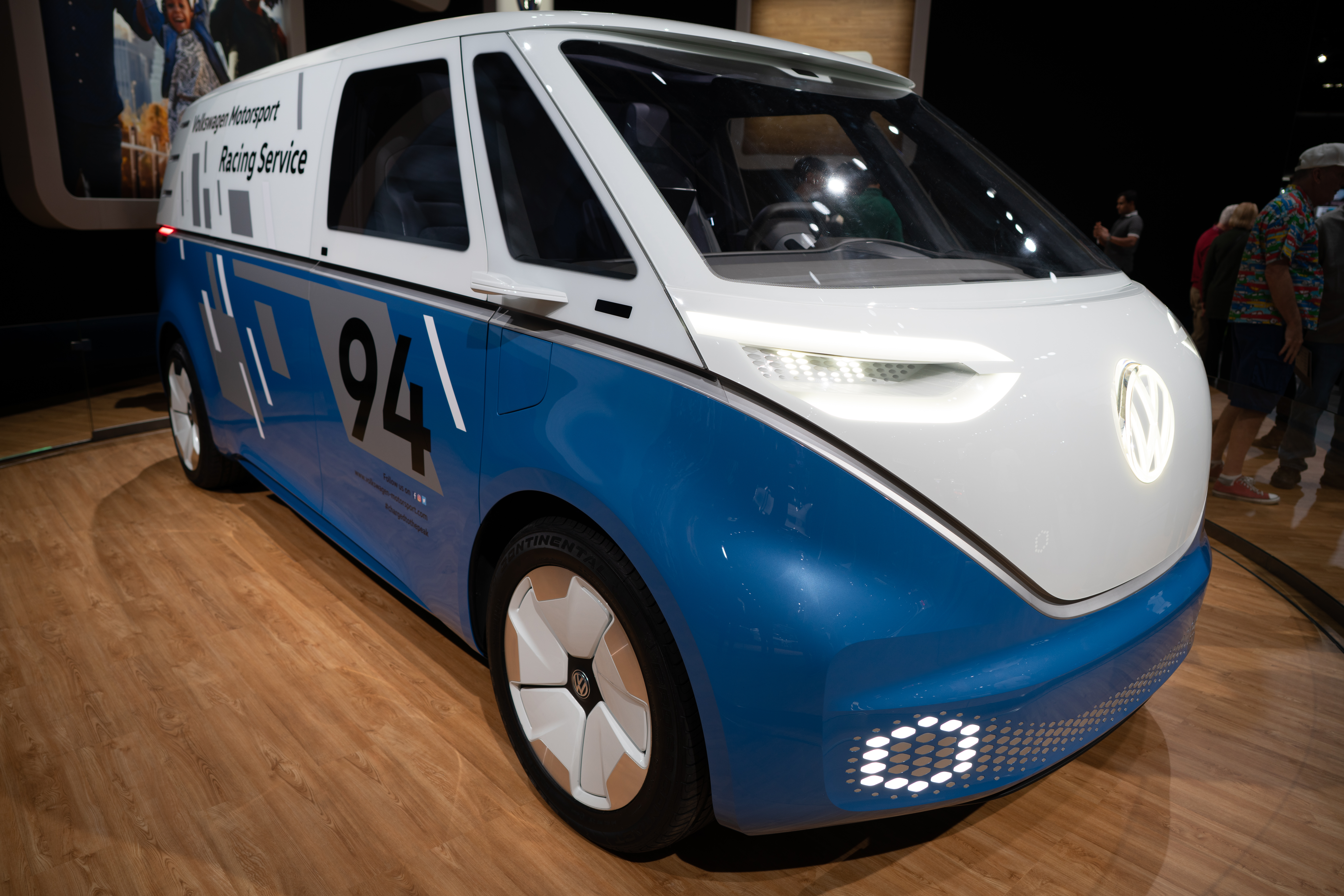
ID. Buzz Cargo concept at the LA Auto Show (2018)

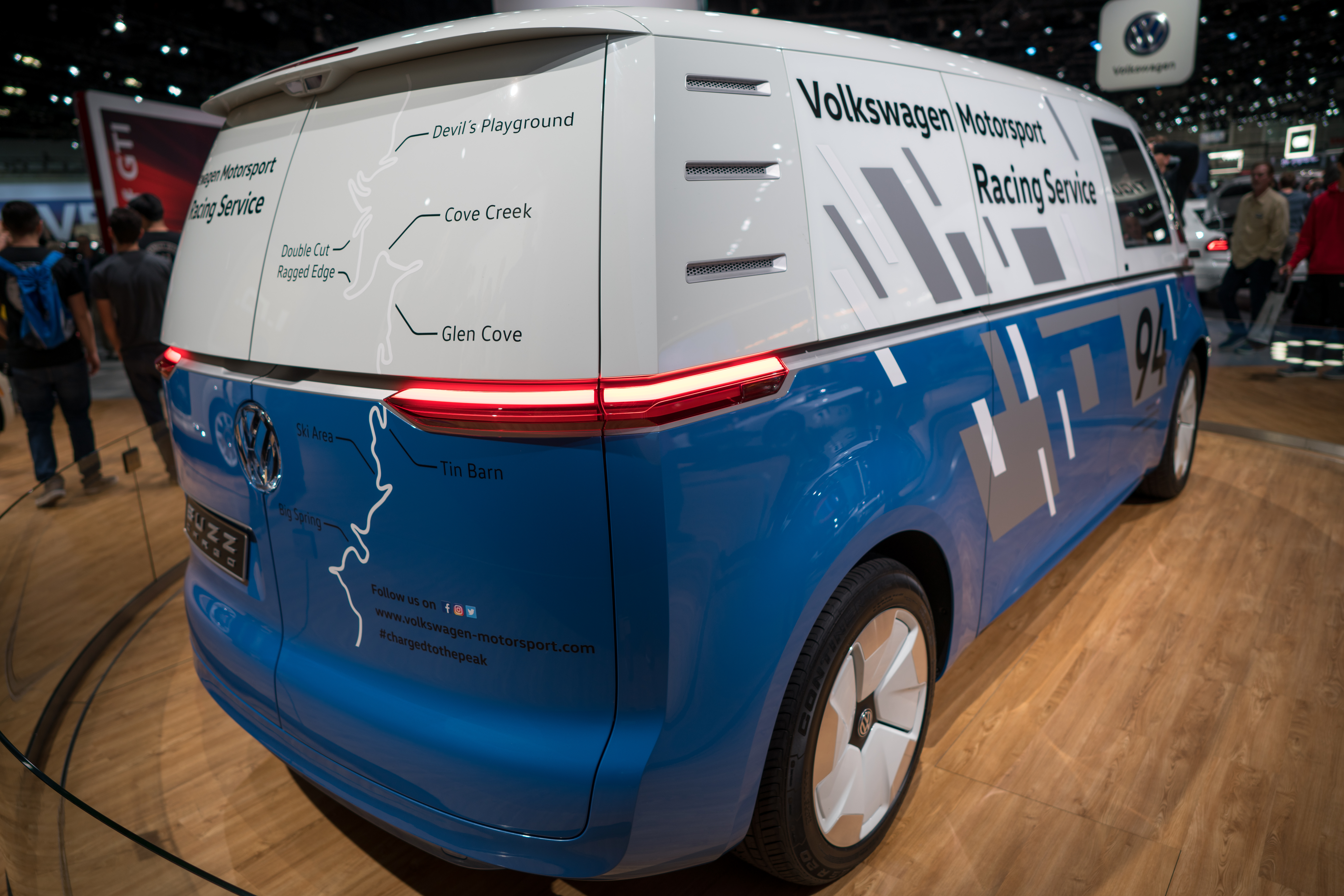
Rear view

== See also ==
- Volkswagen ID. series
- Volkswagen Microbus/Bulli concept vehicles
