= Buzzi =

Buzzi is an Italian surname. Notable people with the surname include:

- Aldo Buzzi (1910–2009), Italian architect
- Arturo Buzzi-Peccia (1854–1943), Italian-American songwriter
- Carlo Buzzi, a seventeenth-century Italian painter
- Carlo Buzzi (17th-century architect) architect of the Lombard Baroque school.
- David Buzzi (b. 1968), Swiss singer and songwriter
- Emanuele Buzzi (born 1994), Italian alpine ski racer
- Fabio Buzzi (1943–2019), Italian motorboat builder and racer
- Ippolito Buzzi (1562–1634), Italian sculptor
- Martín Buzzi (born 1967), Argentine politician
- Michel Buzzi (born 1939), Swiss sailor
- Paolo Buzzi (1874–1956), Italian playwright and poet
- Raffaele Buzzi (born 1995), Italian Nordic combined skier
- Ruth Buzzi (1936–2025), American actor and comedian
- Yuri Buzzi (born 1978), Italian actor and writer

== See also ==
- Al-Buzzi (d. 864), Persian, canonical reciter of the Qur'an
- Buzzi Unicem, an Italian cement company headquartered in Casale Monferrato
- 6517 Buzzi, an asteroid
