= Volkswagen Caravelle =

Volkswagen Caravelle is the nameplate of a van based on the Volkswagen Transporter. For information about the Caravelle, refer to the regular Transporter articles:

- Volkswagen Type 2 (1950–1979), the Caravelle version has a more comfortable interior reminiscent of passenger cars.
- Volkswagen Type 2 (T3) (1979–1992), the Caravelle was a version in Europe and Australia.
- Volkswagen Transporter (T4) (1992–2003), the Caravelle version was in Europe only and featured windows all-round.
- Volkswagen Transporter (T5) (2003–2015), the Caravelle version is sold in European left-hand drive markets and in Australia. In the UK, the T5 Caravelle is the same as the Multivan in other European markets.
- Volkswagen Transporter (T6) (2015–2024), the Caravelle version is sold in European left-hand drive markets and in Australia.
- Volkswagen Transporter (2024) (2024–present)
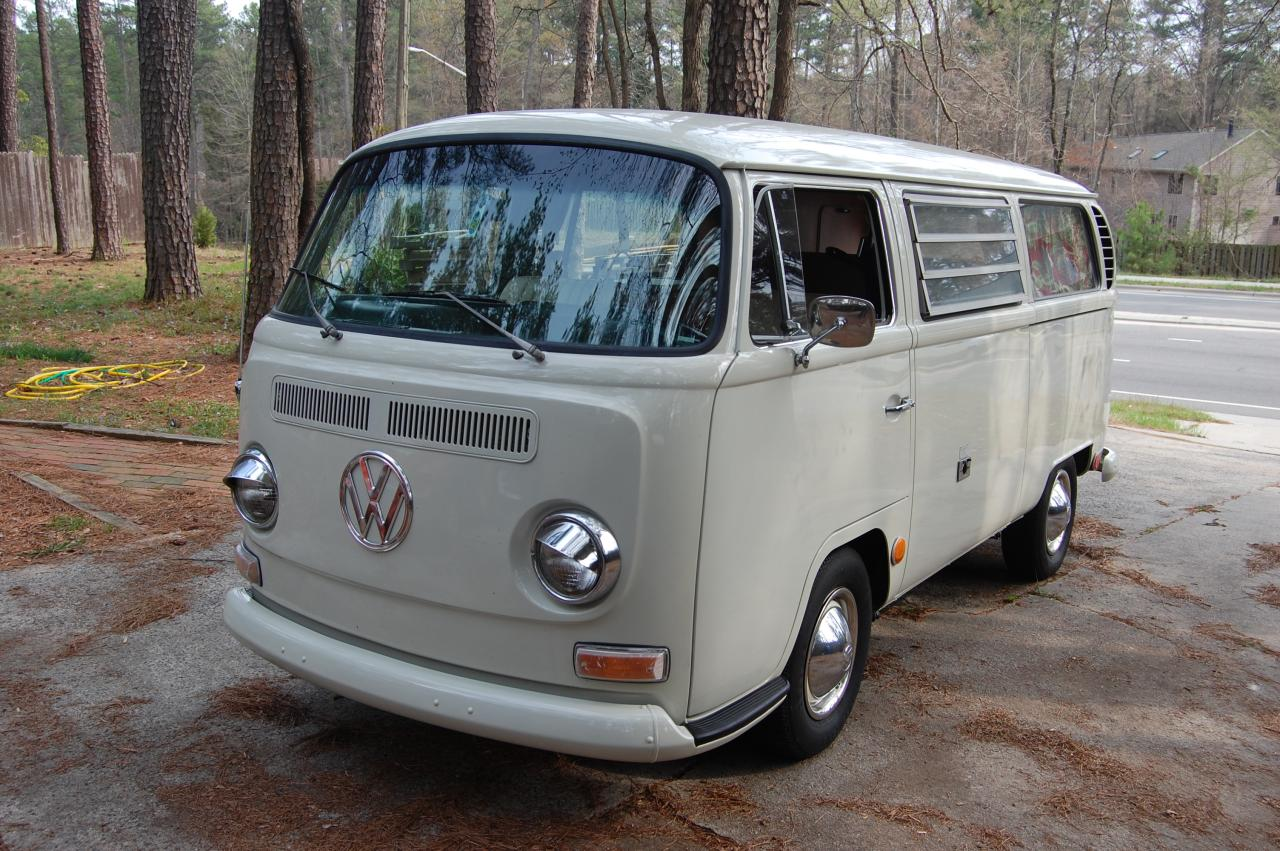
Volkswagen Type 2

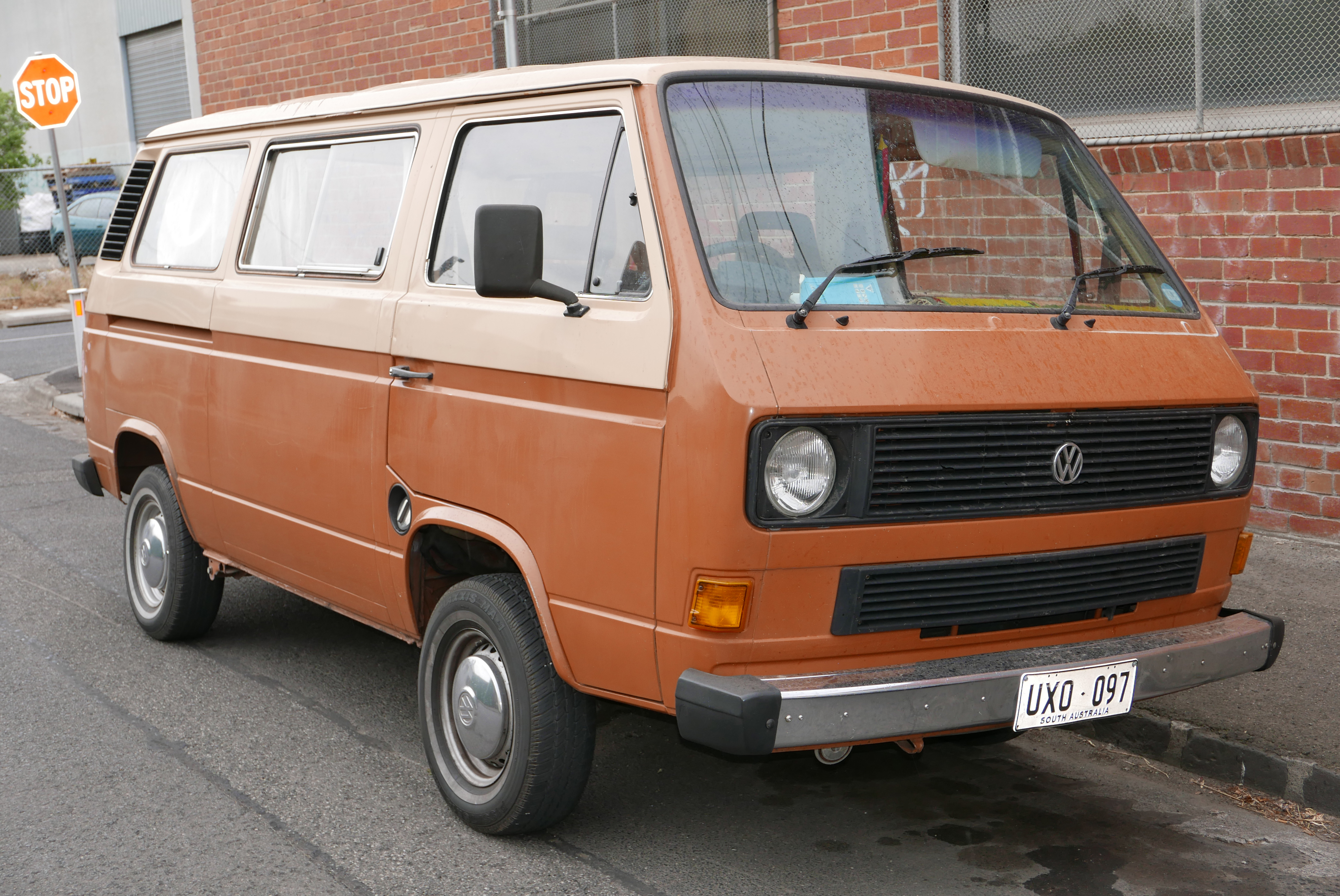
Volkswagen Type 2 (T3)

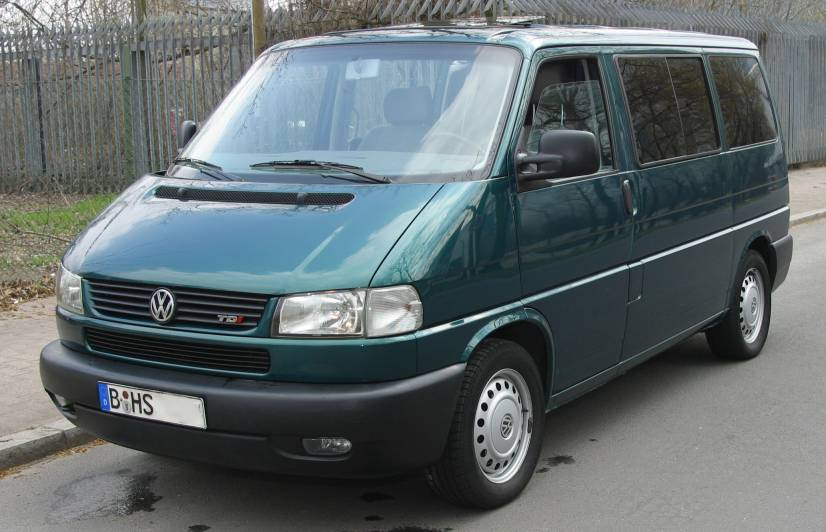
Volkswagen Transporter (T4)

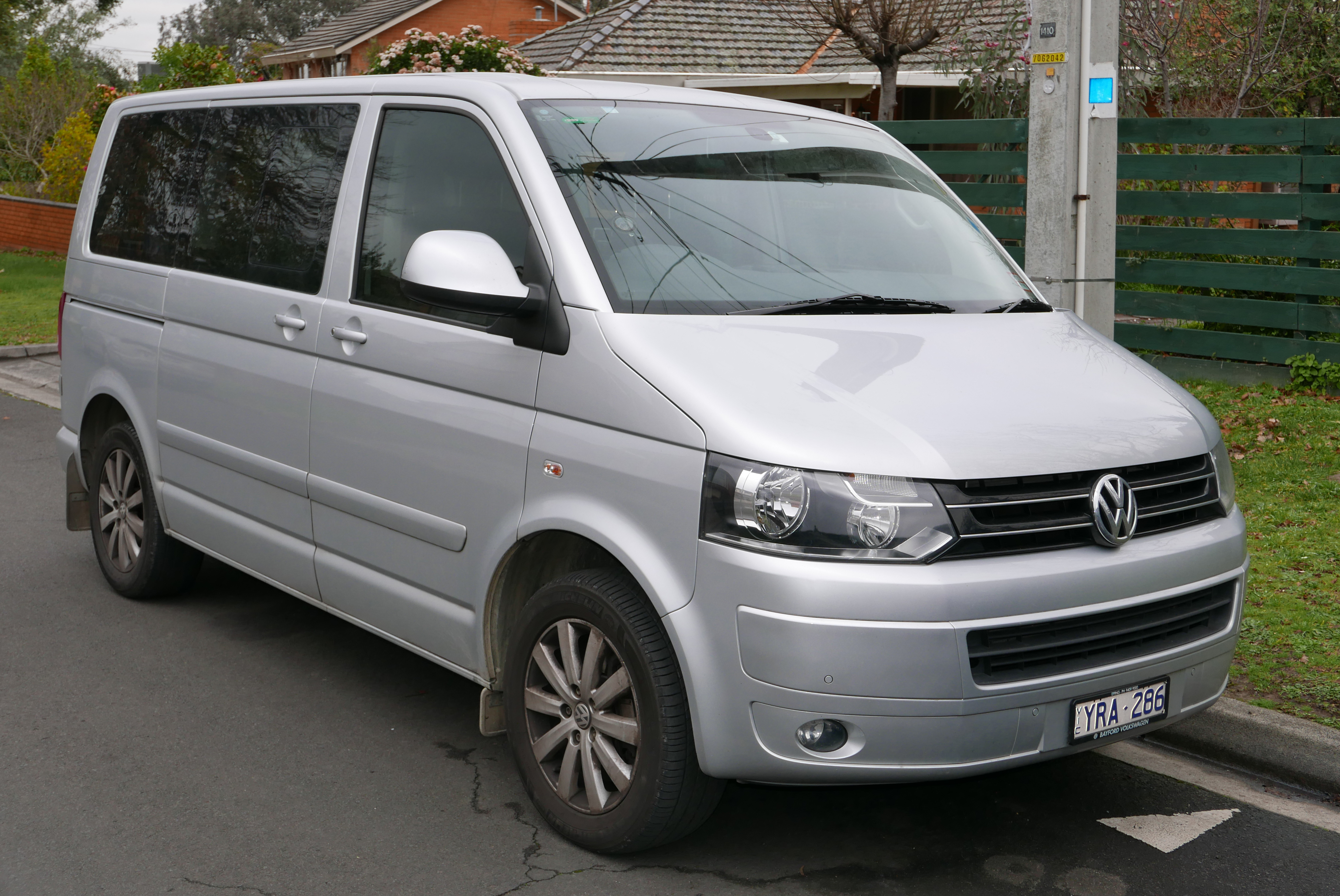
Volkswagen Transporter (T5)

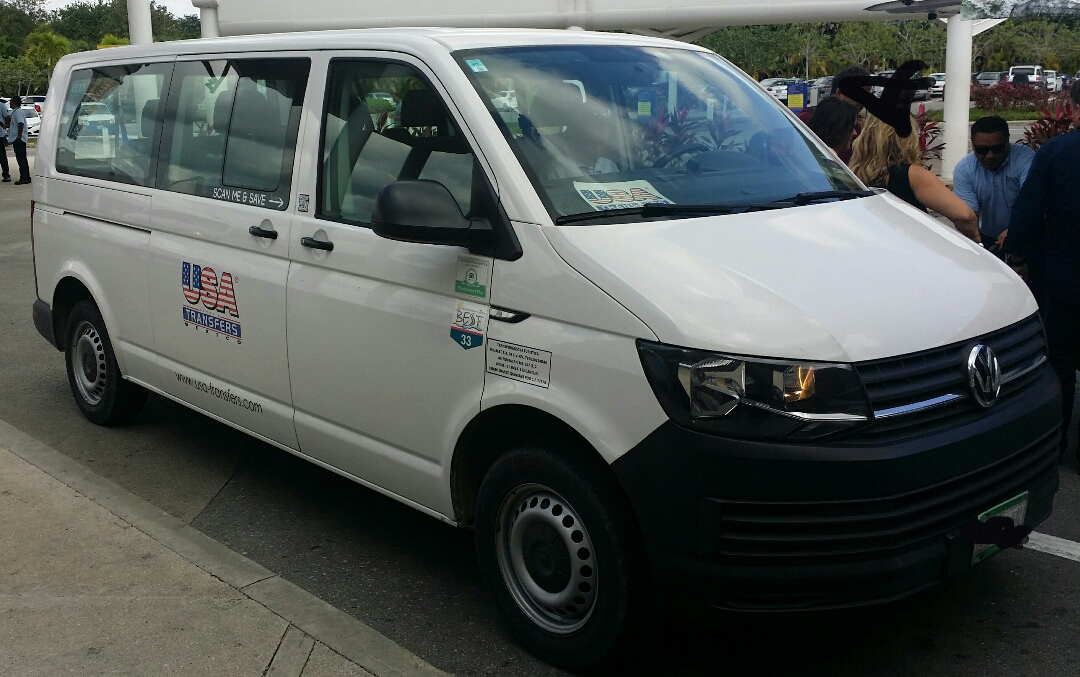
Volkswagen Transporter (T6)

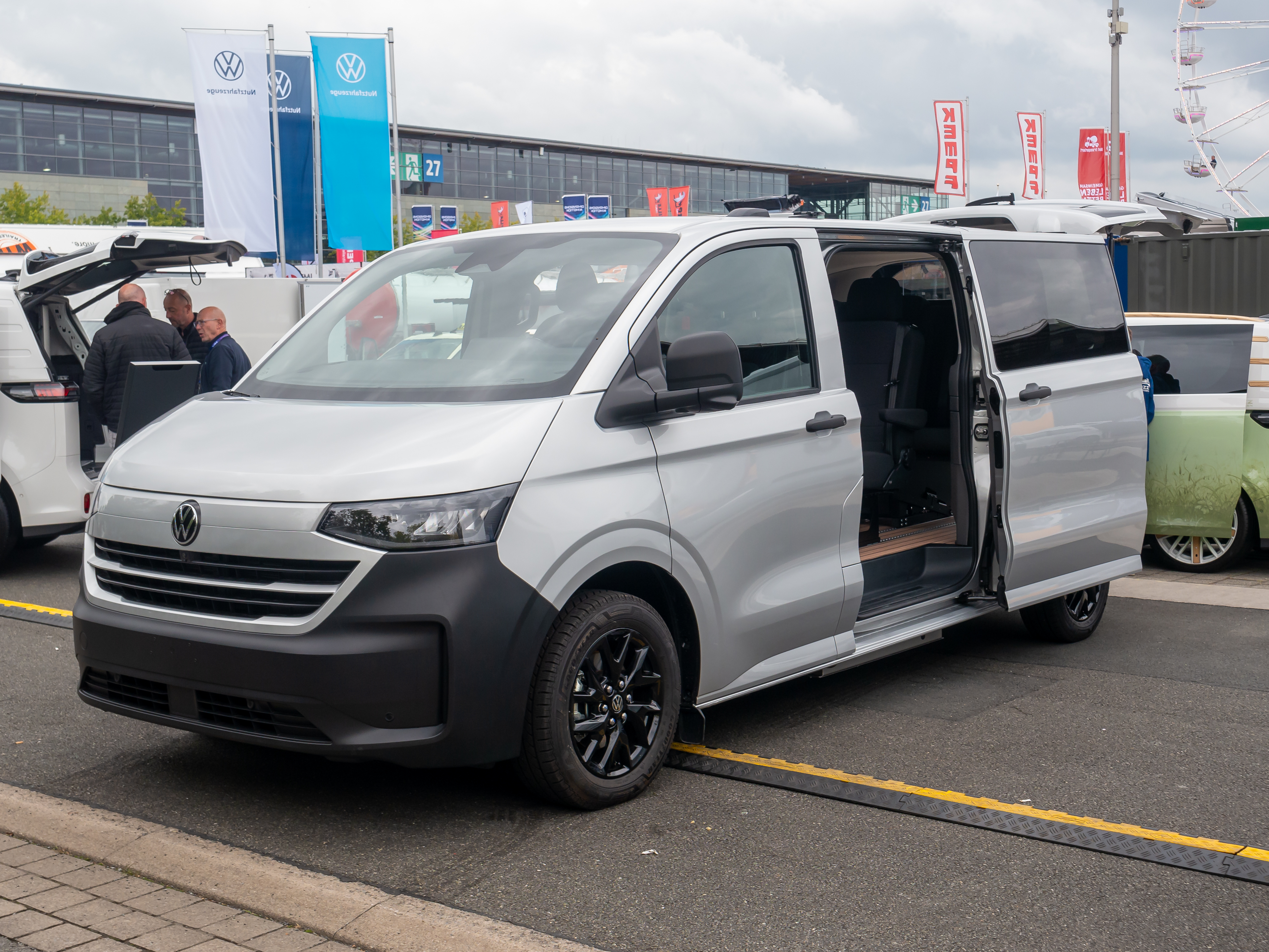
Volkswagen Transporter (2024)
