= Renault Hippie Caviar Hotel/Motel =

Renault Hippie Caviar Hotel Renault Hippie Caviar Motel

Overview
- Manufacturer: Renault
- Production: 2021 (Hotel); 2022 (Motel)

Body and chassis
- Related: Renault Trafic; Renault Kangoo

The Renault Hippie Caviar Hotel and Renault Hippie Caviar Motel are two concept campervans presented by Renault at two German car shows in 2021 and 2022 based on the Trafic III and Kangoo III, respectively.

== Overview ==
=== Hippie Caviar Hotel ===
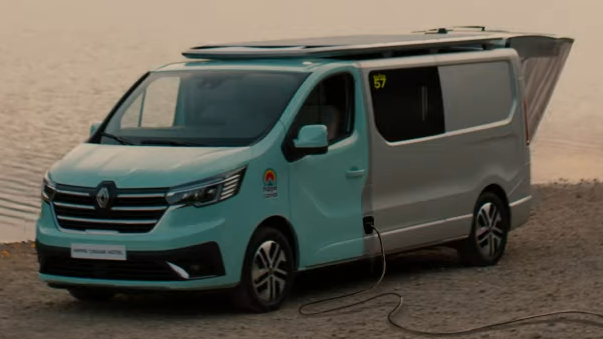
Hippie Caviar Hotel

First previewed earlier that month, the Hippie Caviar Hotel was fully revealed on August 27, 2021, at the 2021 Caravan Salon in Düsseldorf, and is a 1960s-inspired "hippie-chic" van concept.

It is based on the Trafic EV and has a two-tone exterior with a roof terrace as the tables and backrests can be installed on the roof. It also has a cabin with linen and wool upholstery. The concept features an adjustable bed measuring 1,950 mm (77 in) long and 1,450 mm (57 in) wide that can be extended behind the vehicle, while "draperies provide privacy and protection from the weather".

Renault hasn't given details on the electric powertrain, but the van is designed to be accompanied by a "logistics container" that includes a bathroom, shower and recharging point.

=== Hippie Caviar Motel ===
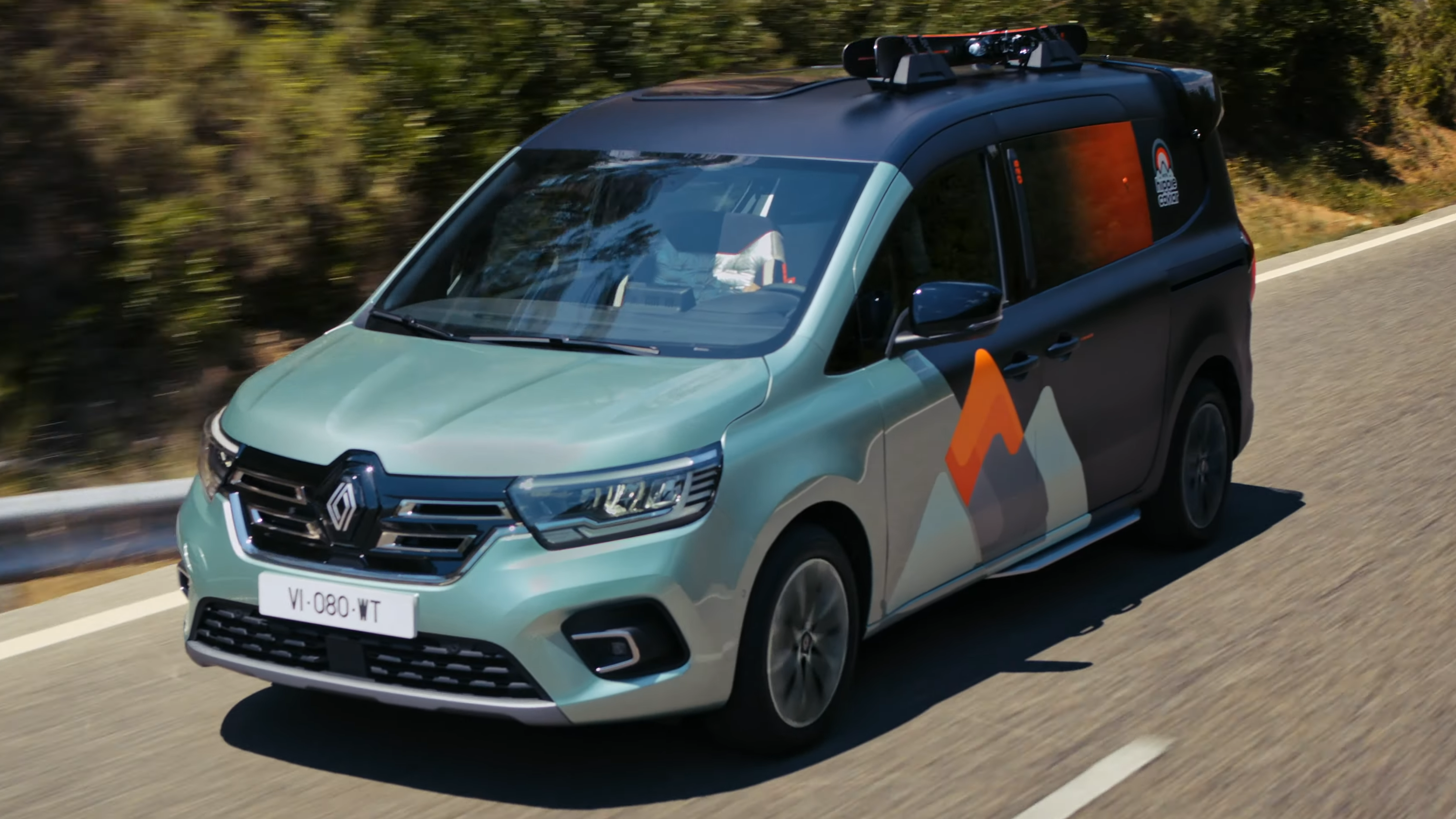
Hippie Caviar Motel

The Renault Hippie Caviar Motel is a show car designed to preview what an eco-friendly EV camper might look like. It made its public debut at the IAA Transportation exhibition in Hanover on September 19, 2022.

The concept is based on the Kangoo L2 E-Tech Electric and has a 45kWh lithium-ion battery pack powering a 118 hp (88 kW) electric motor. This configuration gives the van a range of 285 km (177 mi) and should allow it to accelerate from 0–100 km/h (0–62 mph) in around 11.6 seconds.
