= Volkswagen Multivan (T7) =

Seventh generation of Volkswagen large van

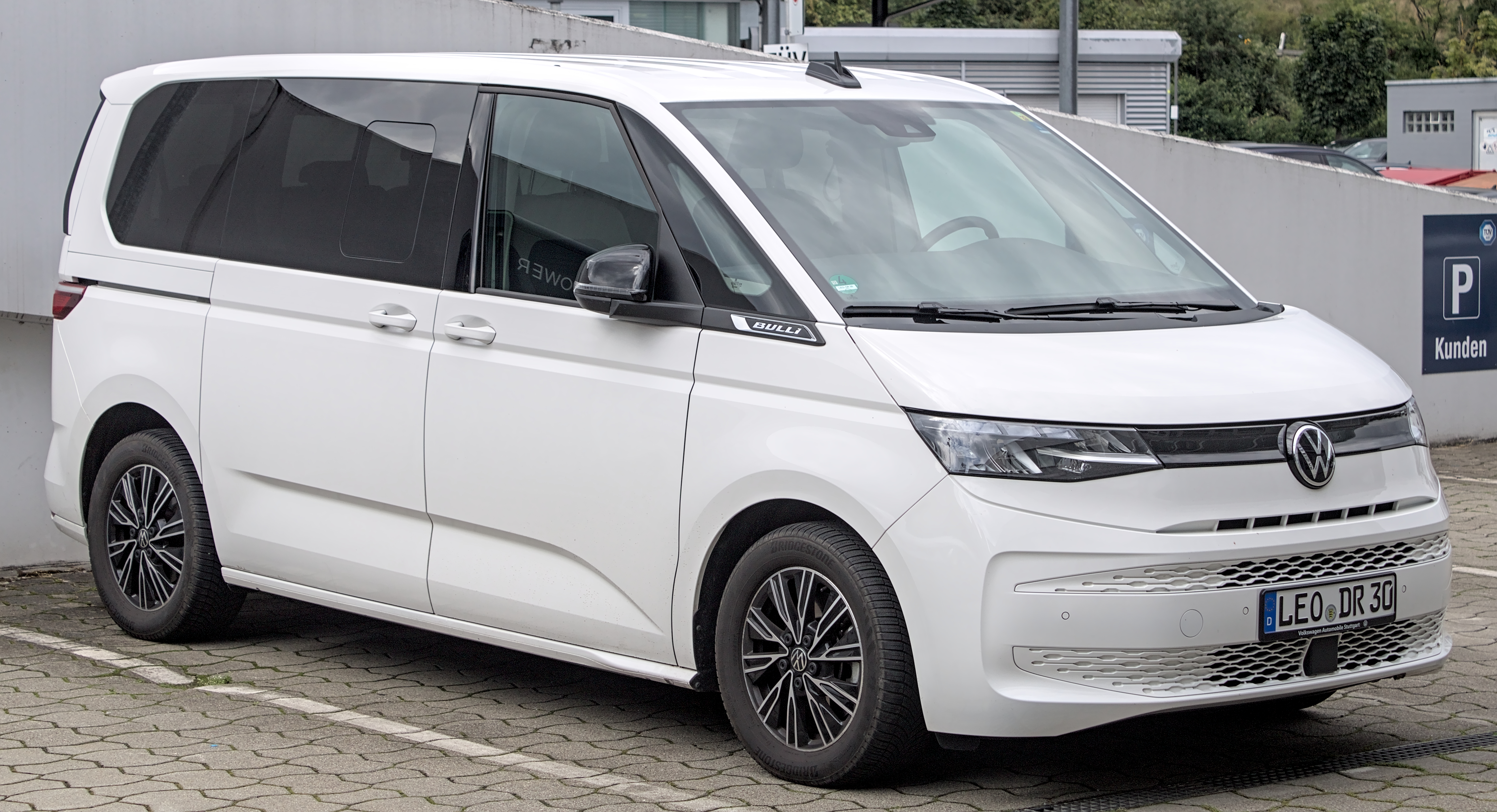

Overview
- Manufacturer: Volkswagen Commercial Vehicles
- Also called: Volkswagen California
- Production: November 2021 – present
- Assembly: Germany: Hanover

Body and chassis
- Class: Large MPV (M); Light commercial vehicle (M)
- Body style: 5-door MPV
- Layout: Front-engine, front-wheel-drive; Front-engine, all-wheel-drive (4motion)
- Platform: Volkswagen Group MQB Evo

Powertrain
- Engine: Petrol: 1.5 L TSI I4; 2.0 L TSI I4; Petrol plug-in hybrid: 1.4 L eHybrid I4; 1.5 L eHybrid I4; Diesel: 2.0 L TDI I4
- Transmission: 6-speed DSG (eHybrid); 7-speed DSG
- Hybrid drivetrain: PHEV
- Battery: 13 (10.4 usable) kWh lithium-ion

Dimensions
- Wheelbase: 3,124 mm (123.0 in)
- Length: Short rear overhang: 4,973 mm (195.8 in); Long rear overhang: 5,173 mm (203.7 in)
- Width: 1,941 mm (76.4 in)
- Height: 1,887–1,907 mm (74.3–75.1 in)
- Curb weight: 1,941–2,257 kg (4,279–4,976 lb)

Chronology
- Predecessor: Volkswagen Sharan; Volkswagen Caravelle/Multivan (T6)

The Volkswagen Multivan (T7) is the seventh generation of the Volkswagen large van series. The Multivan is a large MPV that is based upon on the front-wheel drive MQB Evo platform, which categorises vehicles such as the Audi A3 and the Volkswagen Caddy. The Multivan offers a range of petrol, diesel, and plug-in hybrid models. The T7 Multivan went on sale in Europe in 2022.

The T7 Multivan is solely produced as a passenger car. For commercial applications (cargo/panel van), the T6.1 Transporter continued production until 2023, with its replacement, which was introduced in 2024, built as a sibling of the Ford Transit Custom instead, without any relation to the T7 Multivan. Both the VW and Ford vans are offered with diesel, mild hybrid, plug-in hybrid, or all-electric drivetrains. Sales of this commercial model began in 2024.

In mid-2023, Volkswagen debuted the T7 California Concept at the 2023 Caravan Salon. The T7 is positioned above the Caddy and ID.Buzz, and below Crafter in Volkswagen's van lineup.

== Overview ==
In June 2021, Volkswagen unveiled the T7 Multivan. Longer than its predecessor, the vehicle offers a plug-in hybrid powertrain for the first time. The SWB model measures 4,973 mm (195.8 in), which is about 70 mm longer than before. The LWB models measures 5,173 mm (203.7 in), which is about 130 mm shorter. Production had started in November 2021, order books for the T7 had opened in January 2022, and deliveries had started in March 2022. Three distinct trims (base Life, mid-range Style, and top-range Energetic) are available.

The T7 moves towards the upscale MPV segment, mainly because of the technology and comfort increase compared to the previous generation. The T7 has expanded in price to the point where it costs more than third-generation Mercedes-Benz V-Class. The T7 is a three-row vehicle (seven-seater) that uses all-time front-wheel drive.

For eHybrid models, charging via an AC charger supports a maximum capacity of 3.6 kilowatts, and will take less than 3 hours and 40 minutes. Fast charging is not accessible. The T7 eHybrid features a WLTP-rated range of 46–50 km (29–31 mi), and a NEDC-rated range of 58–60 km (36–37 mi).

For space, the T7 can carry 469 litres (16.6 cu ft) of luggage space with all seats in place. With the third row down, the T7 can carry 1,850 litres (65.3 cu ft) of luggage. Removing the second row makes the total capacity 3,672 litres (129.7 cu ft). For the LWB model, the T7 can carry a total of 4,053 litres (143.1 cu ft) with second and third row seats down. Volkswagen says the seats in the second and third row are 25 per cent lighter to make seat removal an easier process. As the second row seats can rotate up to 180 degrees, passengers in the back can face one another.

Models start at the 1.5 EA211 TSI I4 turbo model which generates an output of 136 PS (100 kW; 134 hp) and 220 N⋅m (162 lb⋅ft). It is followed by the 2.0 TSI EA888 I4 turbo model which generates a power and torque of 204 PS (150 kW; 201 hp) and 320 N⋅m (236 lb⋅ft) respectively. The diesel model, which uses a 2.0 TDI I4 turbo, has an output of 204 PS (150 kW; 201 hp) and 320 N⋅m (236 lb⋅ft). A PHEV model, which uses a 1.4 EA211 I4 turbo engine, combines a petrol engine with an electric motor for a combined output of 218 PS (160 kW) and 350 N⋅m (258 lb⋅ft). The 2.0 TSI, 2.0 TDI, and the 1.5 TSI models use a 7-speed DSG, however the 1.4 PHEV model uses a 6-speed DSG.

In November of 2024, an all-wheel-drive version of the eHybrid was announced. The poweroutput is raised to 245 PS (180 kW; 242 hp), uses a new rear motor producing 136 PS (100 kW; 134 hp), and double the usable capacity of the front-wheel-drive model, coming with 19.7 kWh that can be used instead of the 10.5 kWh on the front-wheel-drive models. The range is also doubled to 95 km (59 mi). The rear axle operates purely on electric power and remains functional even when the battery is depleted. In such cases, the TSI engine and the front electric motor work together to generate the necessary power for the rear axle’s electric motor, with the front motor acting as a generator.

=== Facelift ===
In June 2026, the T7 received a facelift, including styling updates and interior alterations. In selected countries such as the United Kingdom, the T7 revived the historic Caravelle badge, while the Multivan nameplate remains in Germany.

=== Trim levels ===
Trim levels for the Multivan start at the Life variant. Standard features include: 16-inch alloy wheels, a digital instrument cluster, and a 10-inch infotainment system. The Style variant adds: the IQ.Light LED Matrix headlights, Volkswagen's Discover Media navigation system, Park Assist, electrically sliding doors, and 17-inch alloy wheels. The Energetic variant includes what the other trims feature, but adds a PHEV powertrain, a six-speed DCT, 18-inch wheels, a panoramic glass roof, and a premium 14-speaker Harman Kardon sound system with an 840W amplifier. The T7 features twelve colour configurations; three of which are two-tone and the rest which are conventionally coloured.

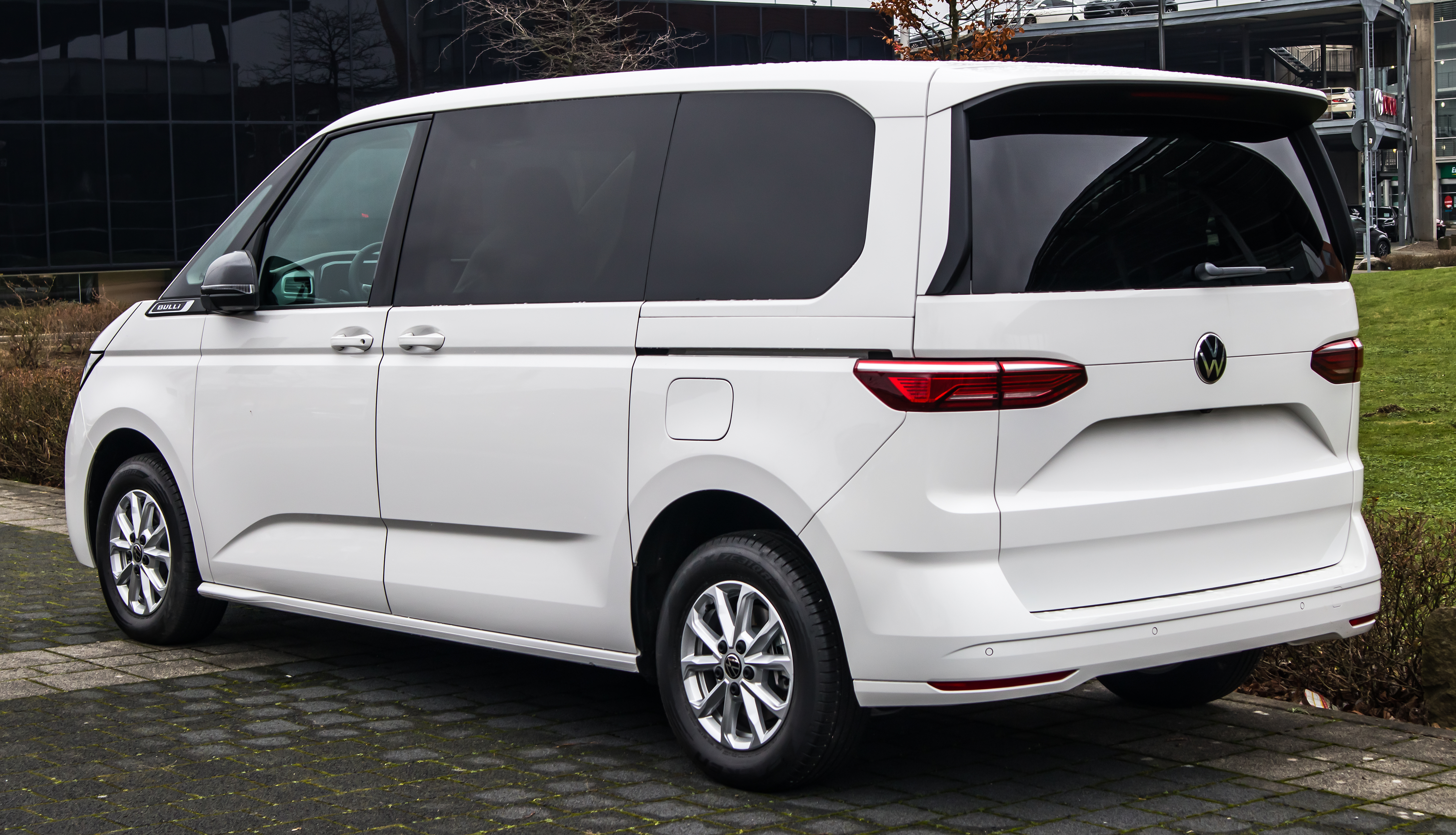
Rear view

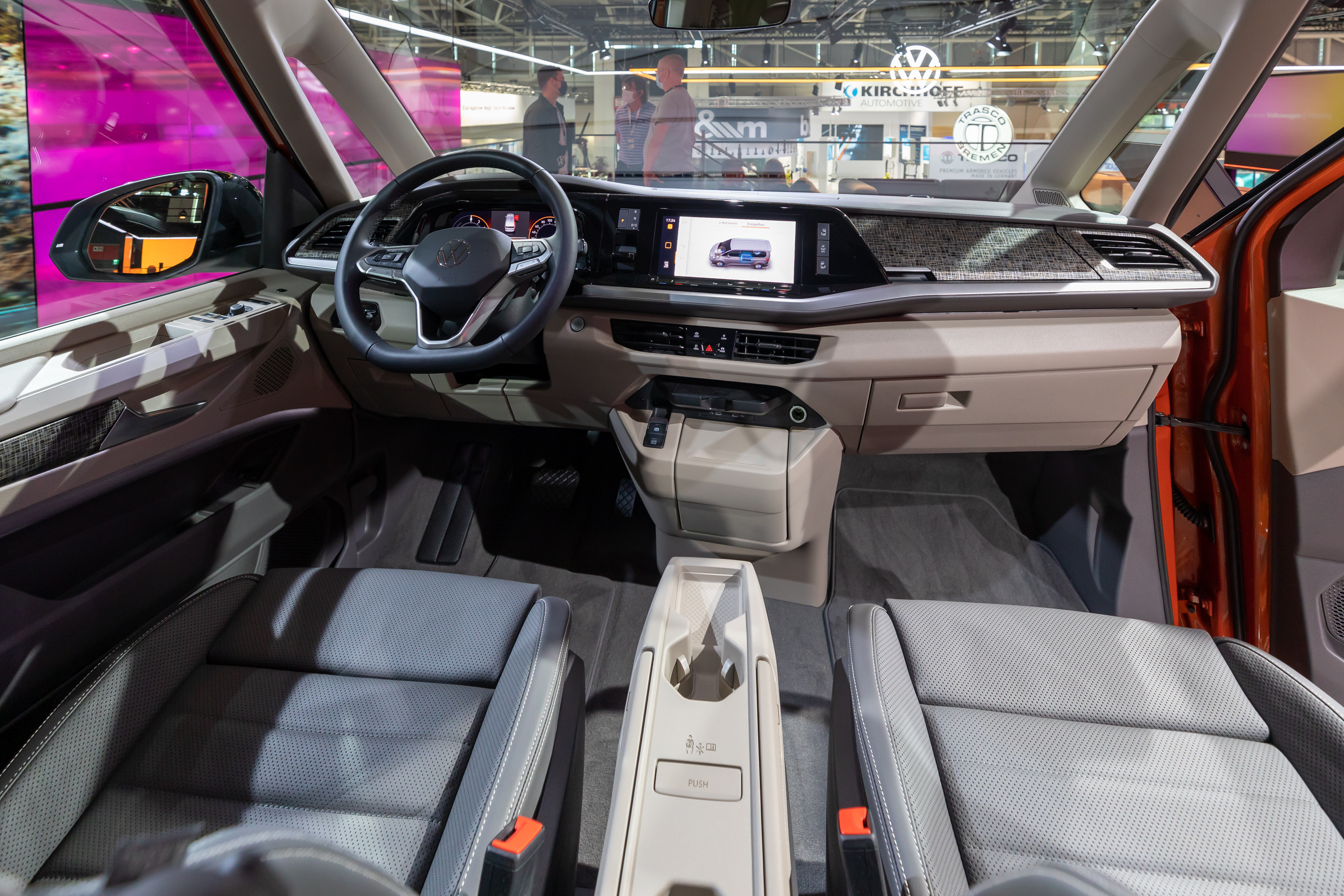
Interior

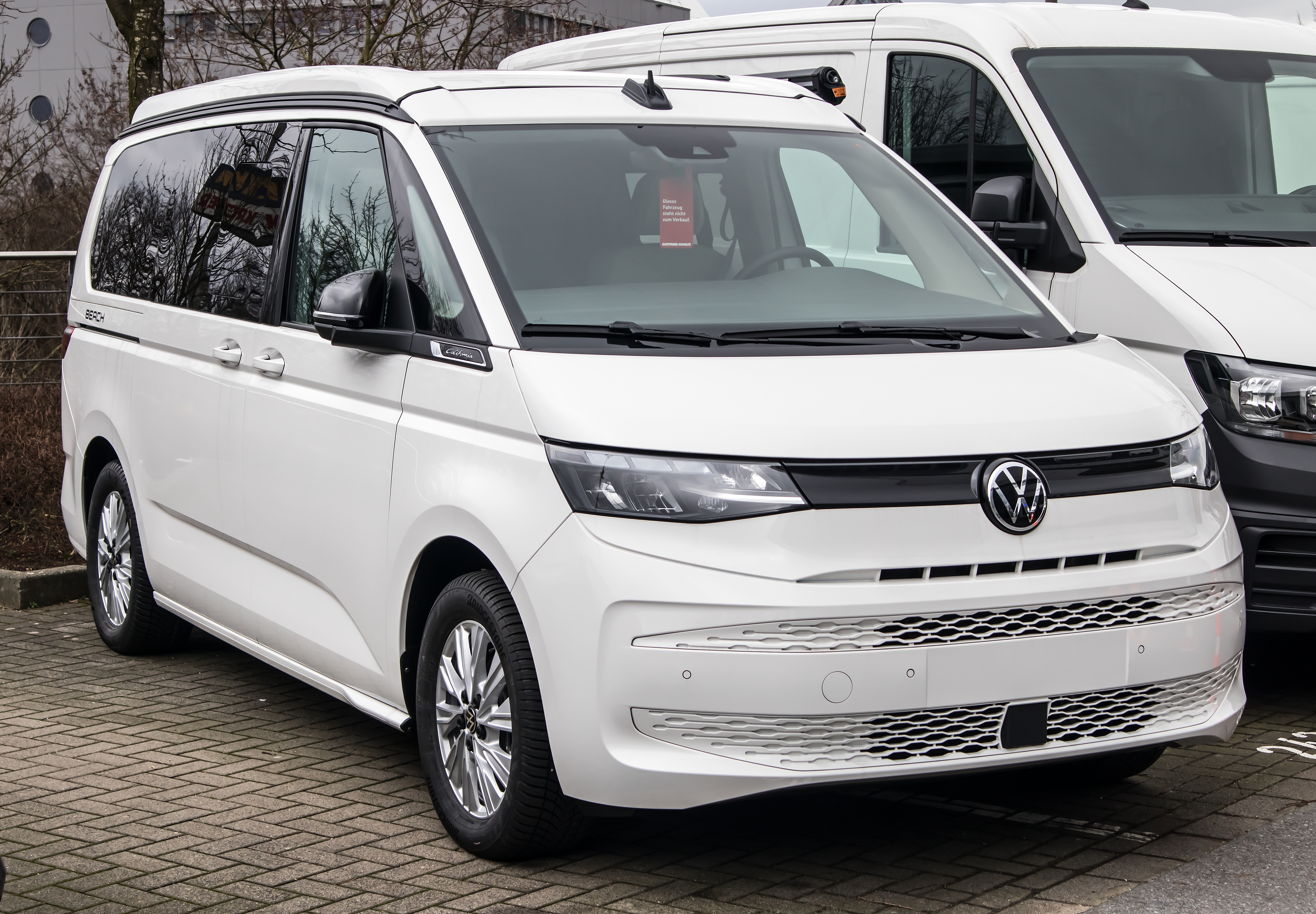
California

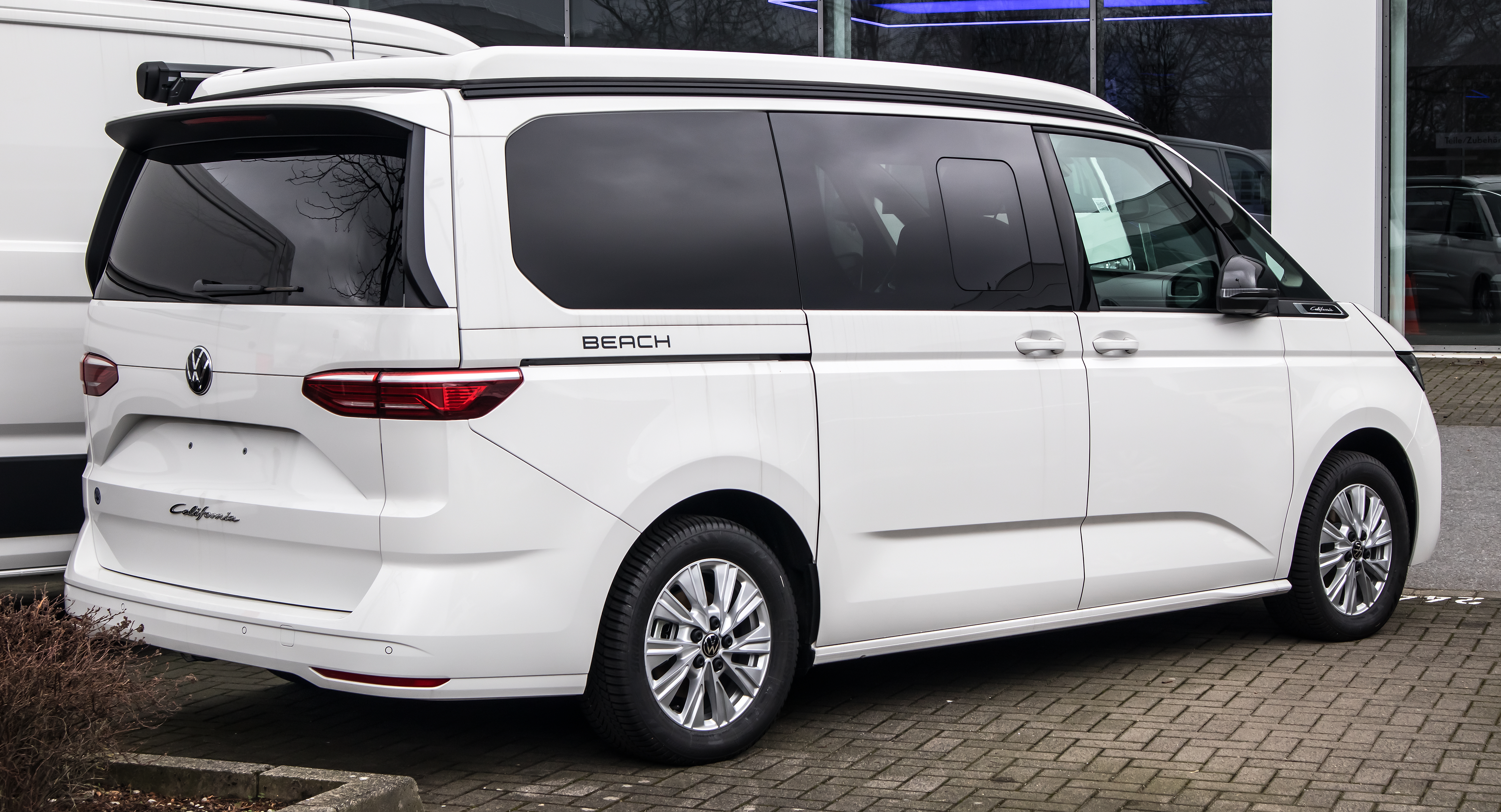
Rear view

== Powertrain ==
Powertrain (T7)
| Type | Model | Engine | | Output | | | Electric system | | Performance | | Powertrain | | Cal. years |
| Type | Model | Engine code | Displacement | Power | Torque | System output | Electric motor(s) | Battery | Top speed | 0–100 km/h (0–62 mph) | Transmission | Layout | Cal. years |
|---|---|---|---|---|---|---|---|---|---|---|---|---|---|
| Petrol | 1.5 TSI | EA211 | 1,498 cc (1.5 L) I4 turbo | 136 PS (100 kW; 134 bhp) @ 5,000-6,000 rpm | 220 N⋅m (22.4 kg⋅m; 162 lb⋅ft) @ 1,750-3,500 rpm | - | - | - | 182 km/h (113 mph) | 13.5 sec | 7-speed DSG | FWD | 11/2021–present |
| Petrol | 2.0 TSI | EA888 | 1,984 cc (2.0 L) I4 turbo | 204 PS (150 kW; 201 bhp) @ 5,000-6,500 rpm | 320 N⋅m (32.6 kg⋅m; 236 lb⋅ft) @ 1,600-4,300 rpm | - | - | - | 200 km/h (120 mph) | 8.4 sec | 7-speed DSG | FWD | 11/2021–present |
| Diesel | 2.0 TDI | EA288 | 1,968 cc (2.0 L) I4 turbo | 150 PS (110 kW; 148 bhp) @ 3,000-3,750 rpm | 360 N⋅m (36.7 kg⋅m; 266 lb⋅ft) @ 1,600-2,750 rpm | - | - | - | 190 km/h (120 mph) | 11.6 sec | 7-speed DSG | FWD | 03/2022–present |
| Petrol plug-in hybrid | 1.4 eHybrid | EA211 | 1,395 cc (1.4 L) I4 turbo | Engine: 150 PS (110 kW; 148 bhp) @ 5,000-6,500 rpm Motor: 115 PS (85 kW; 113 hp) | Engine: 250 N⋅m (25.5 kg⋅m; 184 lb⋅ft) @ 1,550-3,500 rpm Motor: 330 N⋅m (33.7 kg⋅m; 243 lb⋅ft) | 218 PS (160 kW; 215 bhp) / 350 N⋅m (35.7 kg⋅m; 258 lb⋅ft) | 87 kW (117 hp) | 13 (10.4 usable) kWh lithium-ion | 190 km/h (120 mph) | 11.6 sec | 6-speed DSG | FWD | 11/2021–2024 |
| Petrol plug-in hybrid | 1.5 eHybrid 4motion | EA211 | 1,498 cc (1.5 L) I4 turbo | Engine: 150 PS (110 kW; 148 bhp) @ 5,000-6,500 rpm Front motor: 115 PS (85 kW; 113 hp) Rear motor: 136 PS (100 kW; 134 hp) | Engine: 250 N⋅m (25.5 kg⋅m; 184 lb⋅ft) @ 1,550-3,500 rpm Motors: 330 N⋅m (33.7 kg⋅m; 243 lb⋅ft) | 248 PS (182 kW; 245 bhp) / 350 N⋅m (35.7 kg⋅m; 258 lb⋅ft) | Front motor: 85 kW (114 hp) Rear motor:100 kW (130 hp) | 25.7 (19.7 usable) kWh lithium-ion | 200 km/h (120 mph) | 11.6 sec | 6-speed DSG | AWD | 11/2024-present |

== Safety ==
=== ANCAP ===
ANCAP test results Volkswagen Multivan all variants (2022, aligned with Euro NCAP)
| Test | Points | % |
|---|---|---|
| Overall: | 5 /5 stars | |
| Adult occupant: | 34.23 | 90% |
| Child occupant: | 43.36 | 88% |
| Pedestrian: | 37.32 | 69% |
| Safety assist: | 12.65 | 79% |

=== Euro NCAP ===
In a Euro NCAP testing conducted in 2022, the Multivan received a five-star rating.

Euro NCAP test results Volkswagen Multivan (2022)
| Test | Points | % |
|---|---|---|
| Overall: | 5 /5 stars | |
| Adult occupant: | 34.2 | 90% |
| Child occupant: | 44.0 | 89% |
| Pedestrian: | 37.3 | 69% |
| Safety assist: | 14.1 | 87% |

Euro NCAP test results Volkswagen Multivan (2025)
| Test | Points | % |
|---|---|---|
| Overall: | 4 /5 stars | |
| Adult occupant: | 31.0 | 77% |
| Child occupant: | 43.0 | 87% |
| Pedestrian: | 49.5 | 78% |
| Safety assist: | 13.6 | 75% |
