= Volkswagen Transporter (2024) =

Seventh generation of the Volkswagen Transporter

Volkswagen Transporter / Caravelle
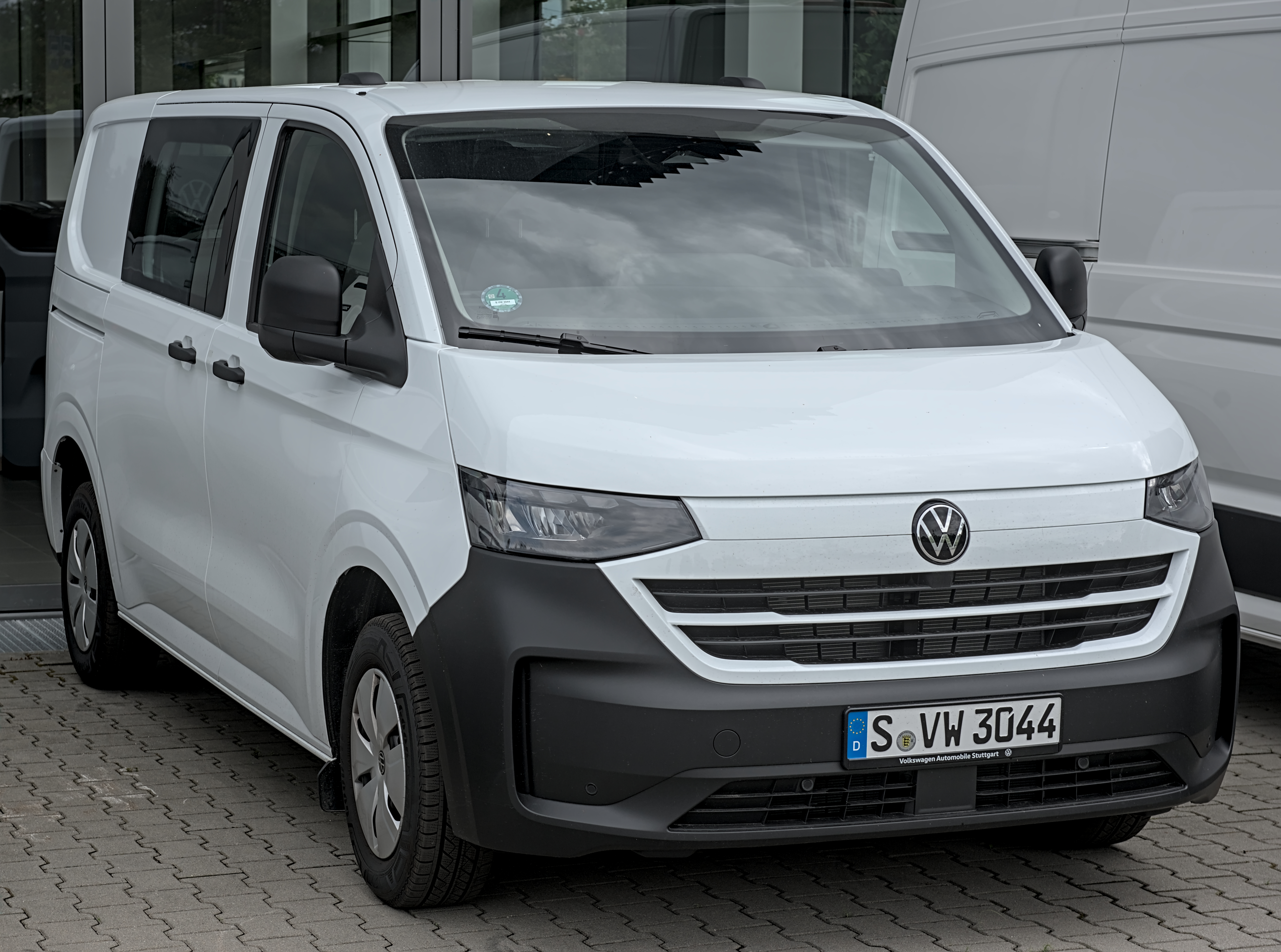

Overview
- Manufacturer: Volkswagen Commercial Vehicles
- Also called: Ford Transit Custom / Tourneo Custom Volkswagen Caravelle
- Production: 2024–present
- Assembly: Turkey: Gölcük, Kocaeli (Ford Otosan)

Body and chassis
- Class: Light commercial vehicle (M)
- Body style: 6-door van; 5-door minibus; 4-door crew cab
- Layout: Front-engine, front-wheel-drive; Rear-motor, rear-wheel-drive (EV); Front-engine, four-wheel-drive
- Platform: Ford Pro platform
- Related: Ford Transit Custom

Powertrain
- Engine: Diesel: 2.0 L TDI I4 turbo; Petrol hybrid: 2.5 L eHybrid PHEV I4 turbo
- Transmission: 6-speed manual; 8-speed automatic
- Battery: 63.8 kWh lithium ion (EV); 16.5 kWh Li-NMC (PHEV)

Dimensions
- Wheelbase: 3,100 / 3,500 mm (122.0 / 137.8 in)
- Length: 5,050 / 5,450 mm (198.8 / 214.6 in)
- Width: 2,030 mm (79.9 in)
- Height: 2,000 mm (78.7 in)

Chronology
- Predecessor: Volkswagen Transporter (T6)

The Volkswagen Transporter and the passenger variant Caravelle were unveiled in August 2024. Unlike the Multivan T7 based on the modular MQB platform, the model is based on the Ford Transit Custom. Volkswagen has not officially applied the T7 designation to this model.

== Gallery ==
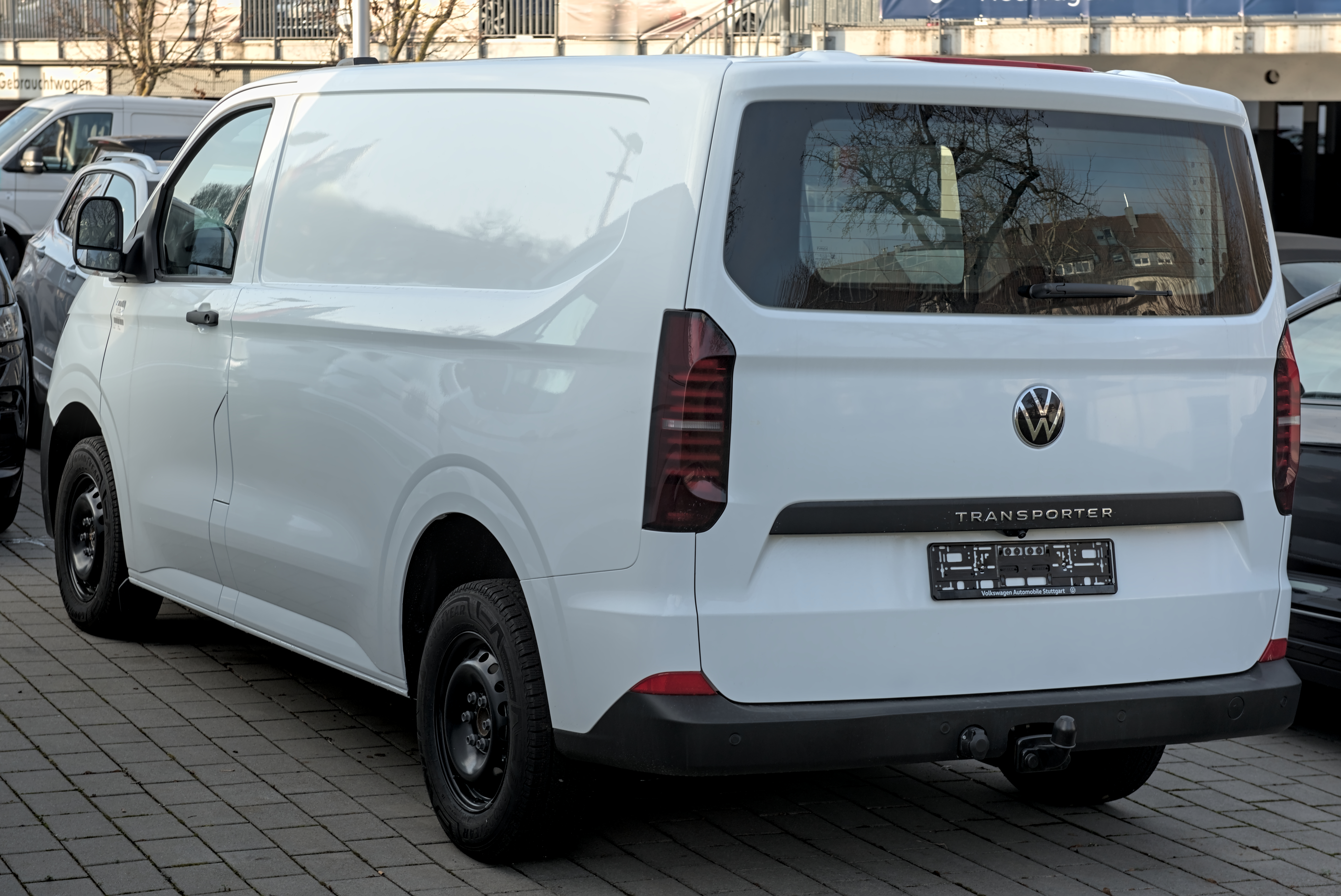
Rear view

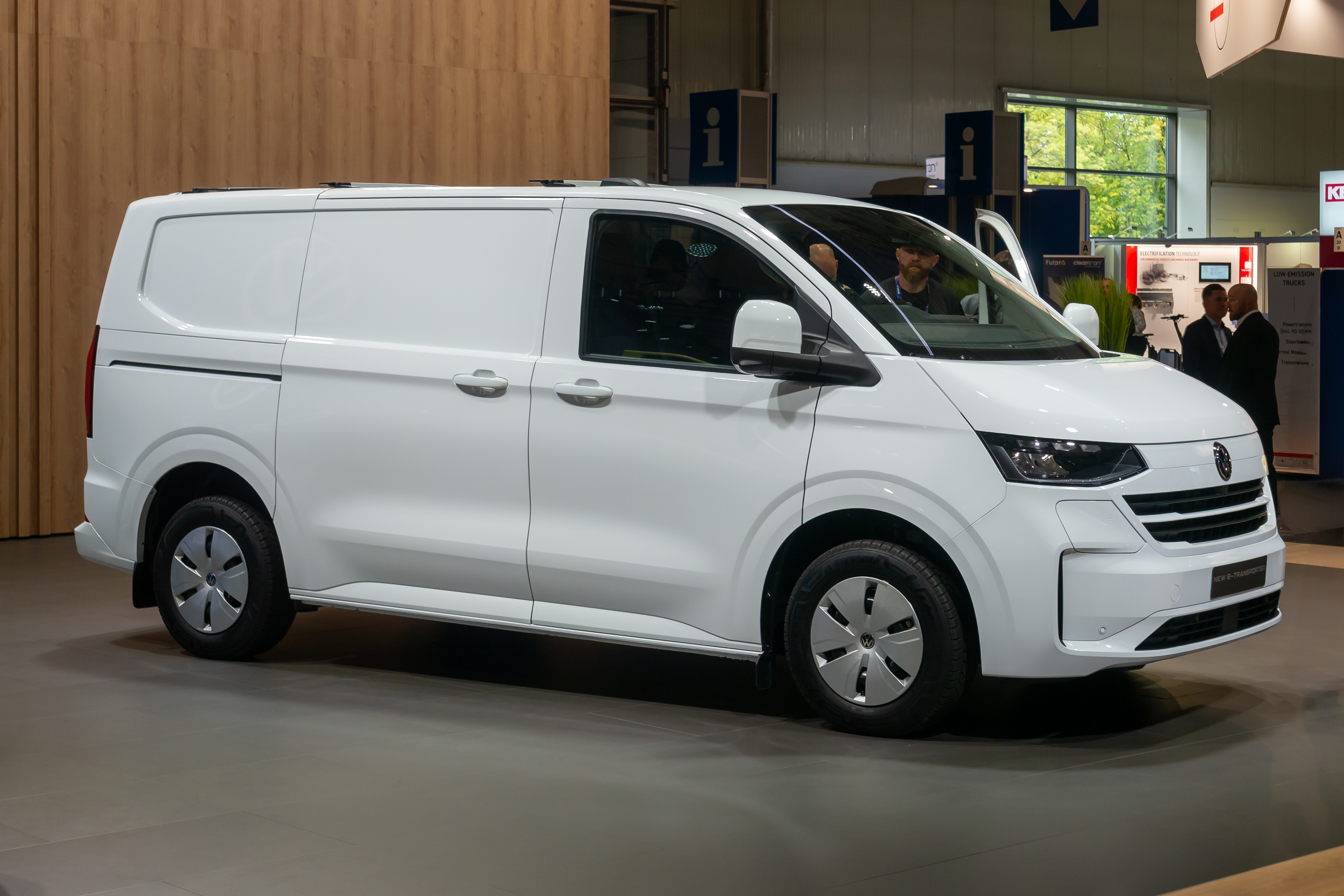
Volkswagen e-Transporter

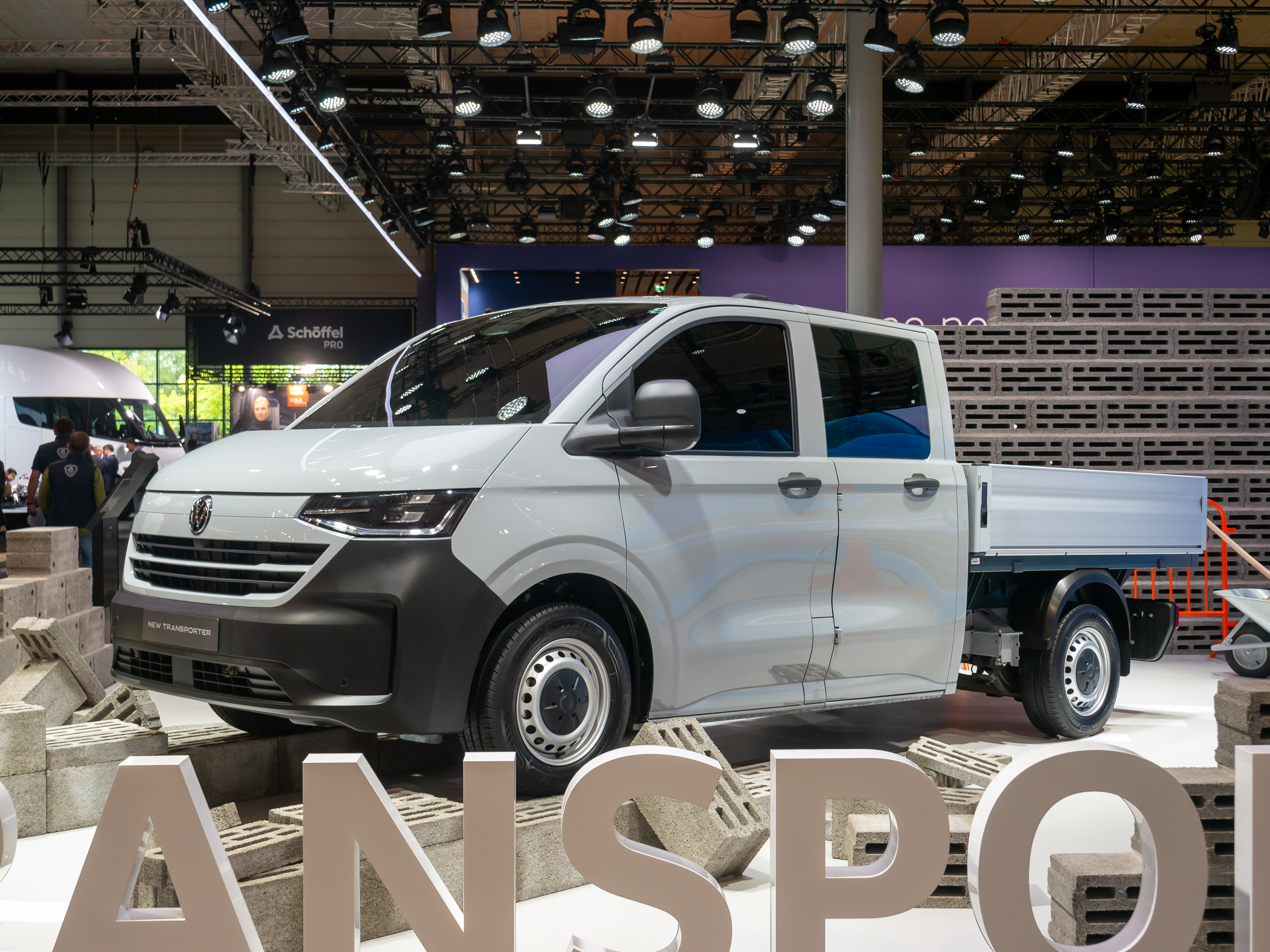
Volkswagen Transporter crew cab

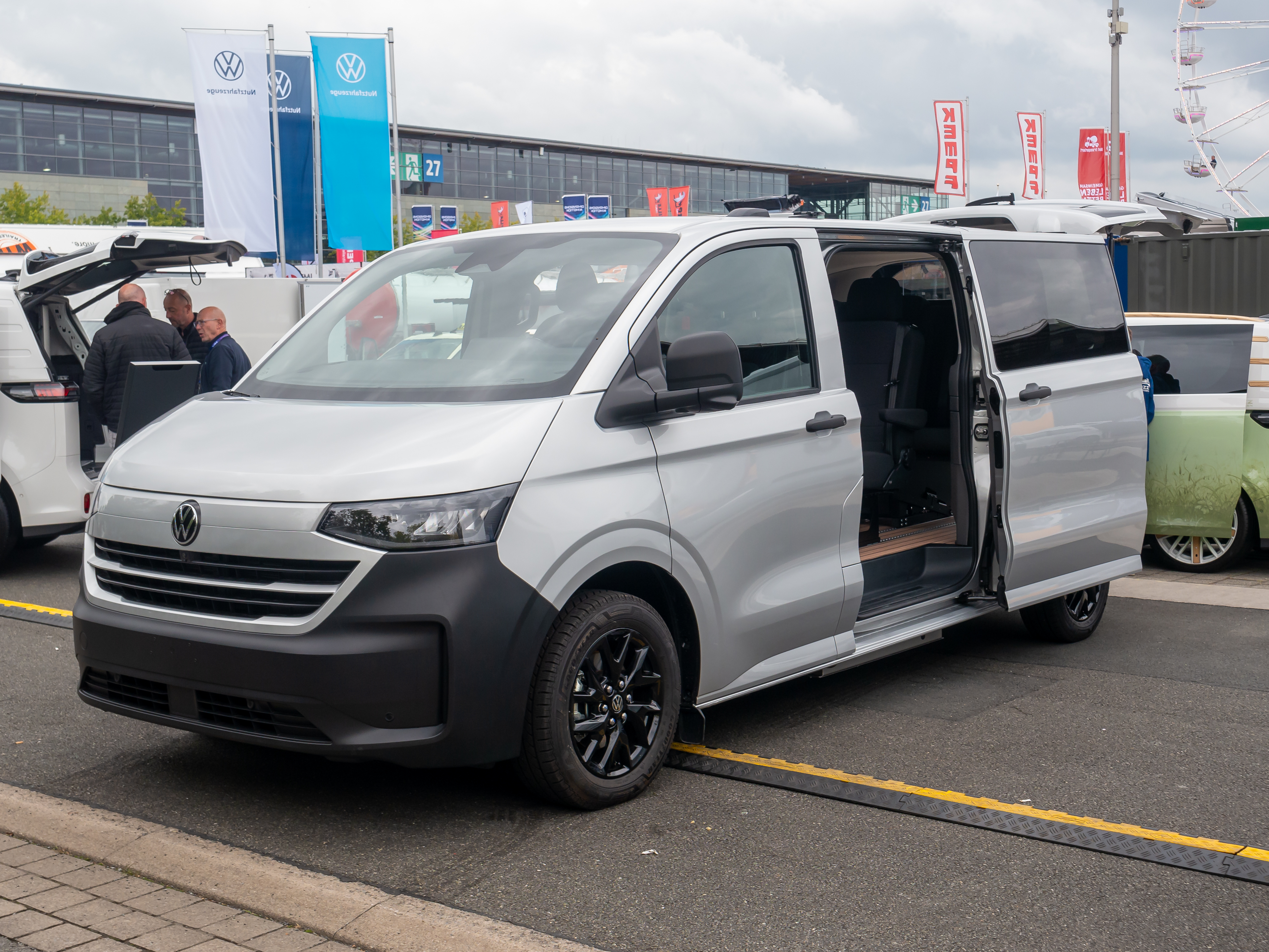
Volkswagen Caravelle

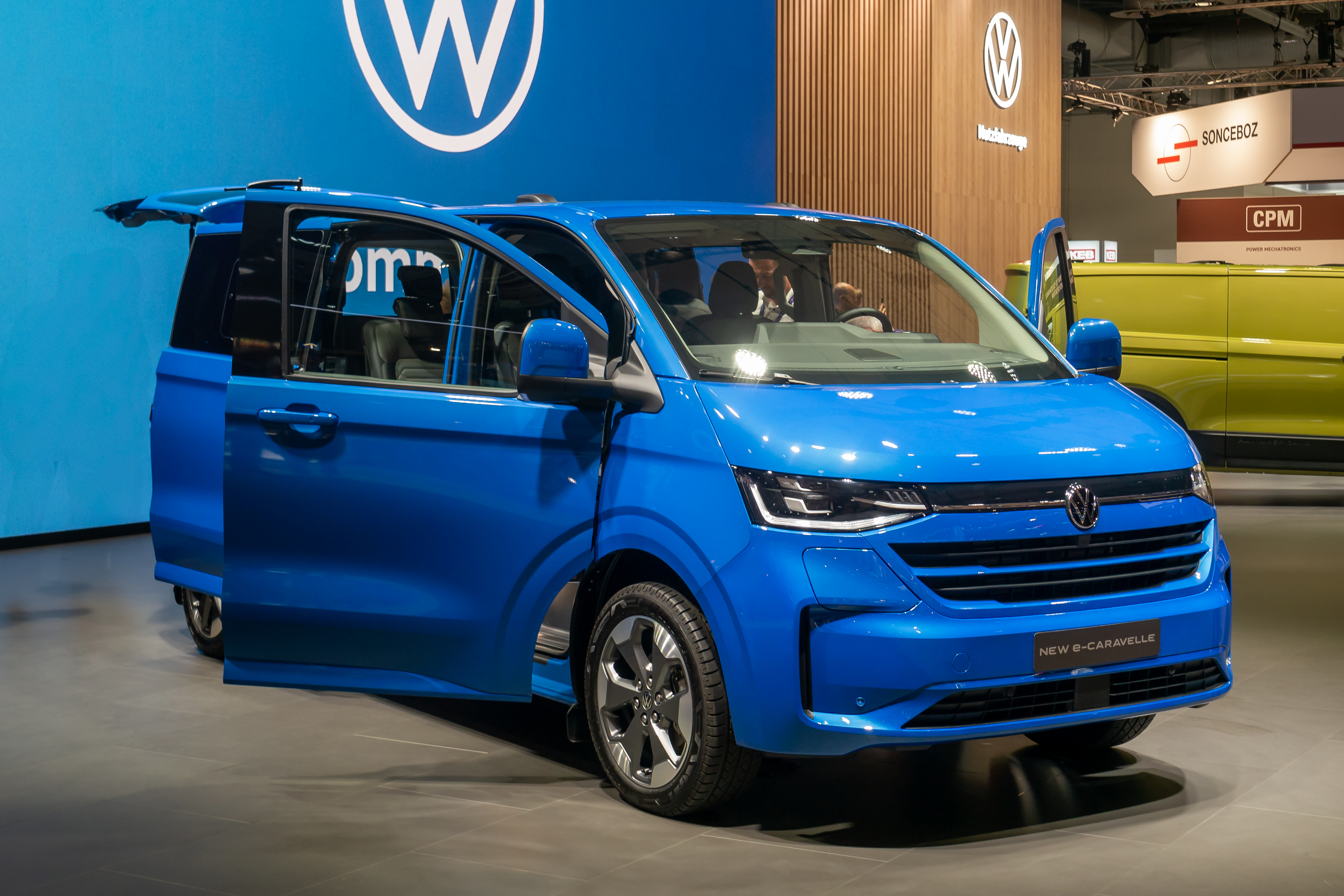
Volkswagen e-Caravelle

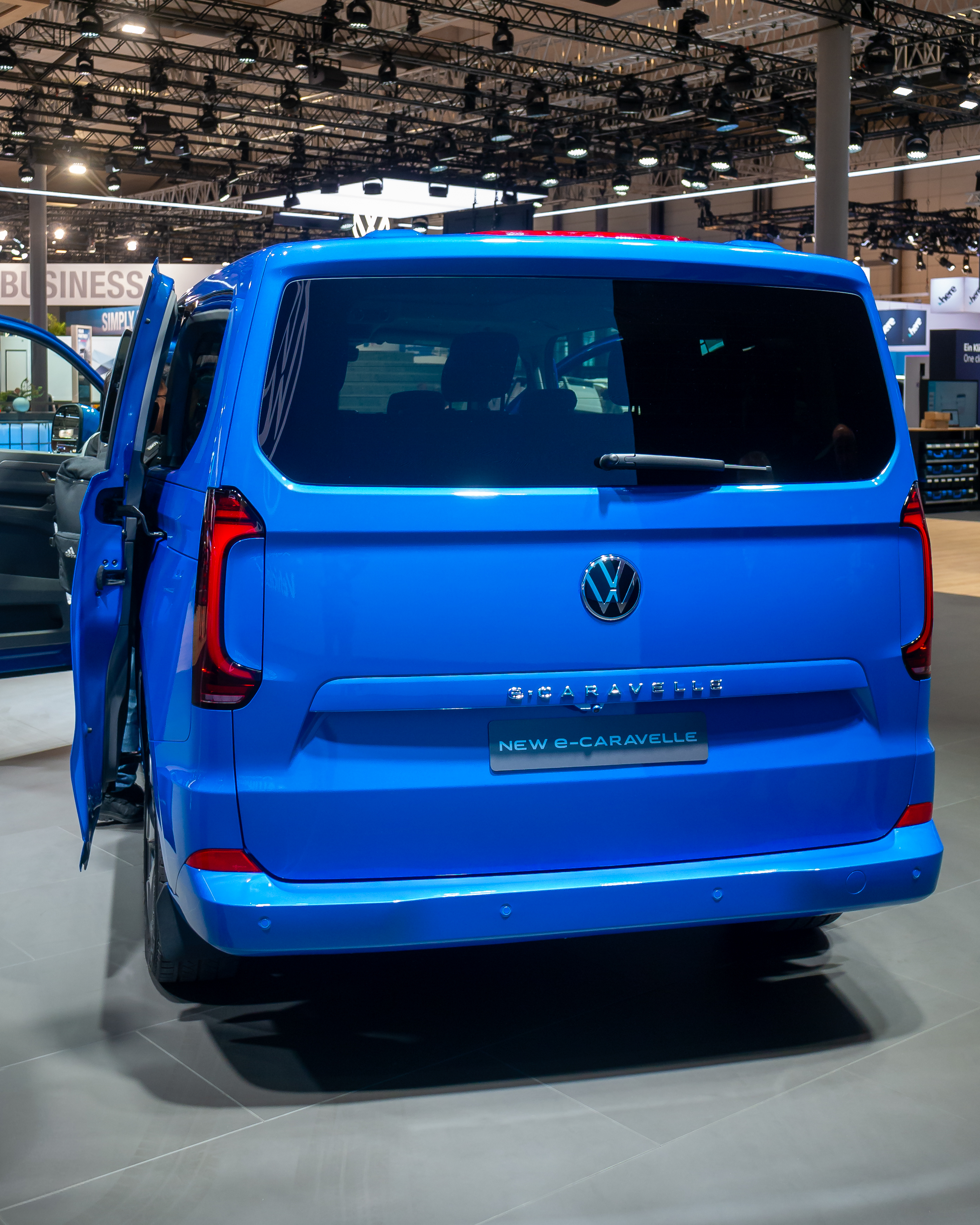
Rear view

== Safety ==
Euro NCAP test results Ford Tourneo Custom 2.0 Ecoblue 'Titanium' (LHD) (2025)
| Test | Points | % |
|---|---|---|
| Overall: | 4 /5 stars | |
| Adult occupant: | 34.4 | 86% |
| Child occupant: | 42.6 | 86% |
| Pedestrian: | 49.9 | 79% |
| Safety assist: | 11.9 | 66% |

Euro NCAP test results Volkswagen Transporter (2025)
| Test | Score |
|---|---|
| Overall: | 5 /5 stars |
| Safe driving | 80% |
| Crash avoidance | 93% |
| Post crash | 80% |

ANCAP test results Volkswagen Transporter (2024)
Overall
| Grading: | 93% (Platinum) |
