= Volkswagen Transporter (T6) =

Sixth generation of the Volkswagen Transporter

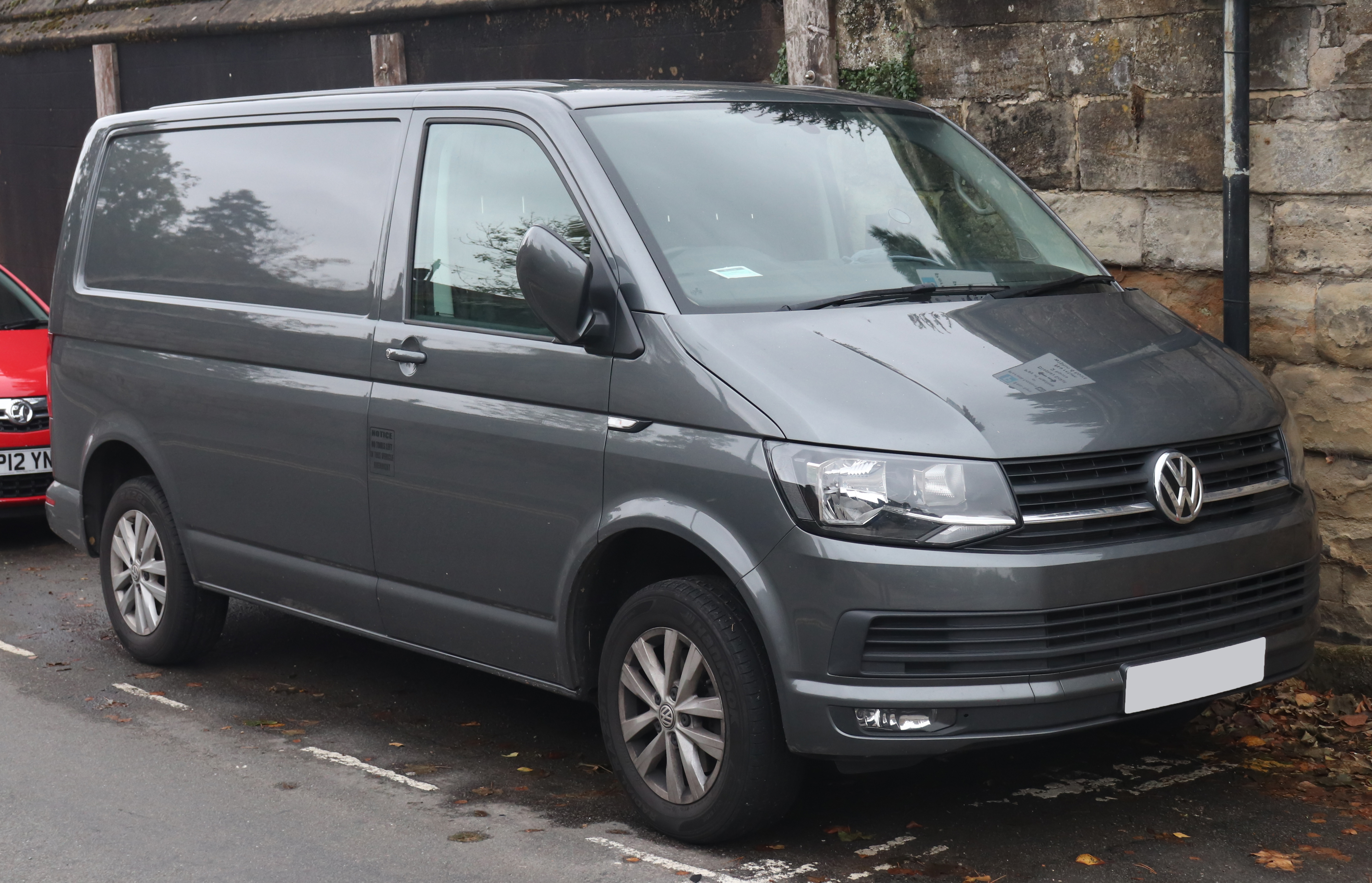

Overview
- Manufacturer: Volkswagen Commercial Vehicles
- Also called: Volkswagen Caravelle; Volkswagen Multivan; Volkswagen California; Volkswagen T6.1 (facelift)
- Production: 2015–2024
- Assembly: Germany: Hannover (Hannover Plant); Poland: Poznań (Volkswagen Poznań Sp. z o.o.); Russia: Kaluga (Volkswagen Group Rus)

Body and chassis
- Class: Light commercial vehicle (M)
- Body style: Van (cargo/passenger); Pick-up; Minibus; Crew cab chassis cab Campervan
- Layout: Front-engine, front-wheel-drive or four-wheel-drive (4motion)
- Platform: Volkswagen Group T6 platform

Powertrain
- Engine: Petrol: 2.0 L I4; Diesel: 2.0 L TDI turbo I4; 2.0 L BiTDi twin-turbo I4
- Transmission: 4-speed automatic (DSG) (electric) 5-speed manual 6-speed manual 7-speed automatic (DSG)
- Battery: 37.3 kWh (ABT e-Transporter 6.1)

Dimensions
- Wheelbase: 3,000 / 3,400 mm (118.1 / 133.9 in) (SWB/LWB)
- Length: 4,904 / 5,304 mm (193.1 / 208.8 in) (SWB/LWB)
- Width: 2,297 mm (90.4 in), 1,904 mm (75.0 in) (excl. mirrors)
- Height: 1,990 / 2,176 / 2,477 mm (78.3 / 85.7 / 97.5 in) (low/med/high roof)

Chronology
- Predecessor: Volkswagen Transporter (T5)
- Successor: Volkswagen Multivan (T7); Volkswagen Transporter (2024)

The Volkswagen Transporter T6 is the sixth generation of the Volkswagen Transporter vans. It is the successor to the T5 Transporter. The Transporter line was a mid-size van offered by Volkswagen Commercial Vehicles, between the larger Crafter and smaller Caddy.

== Overview ==
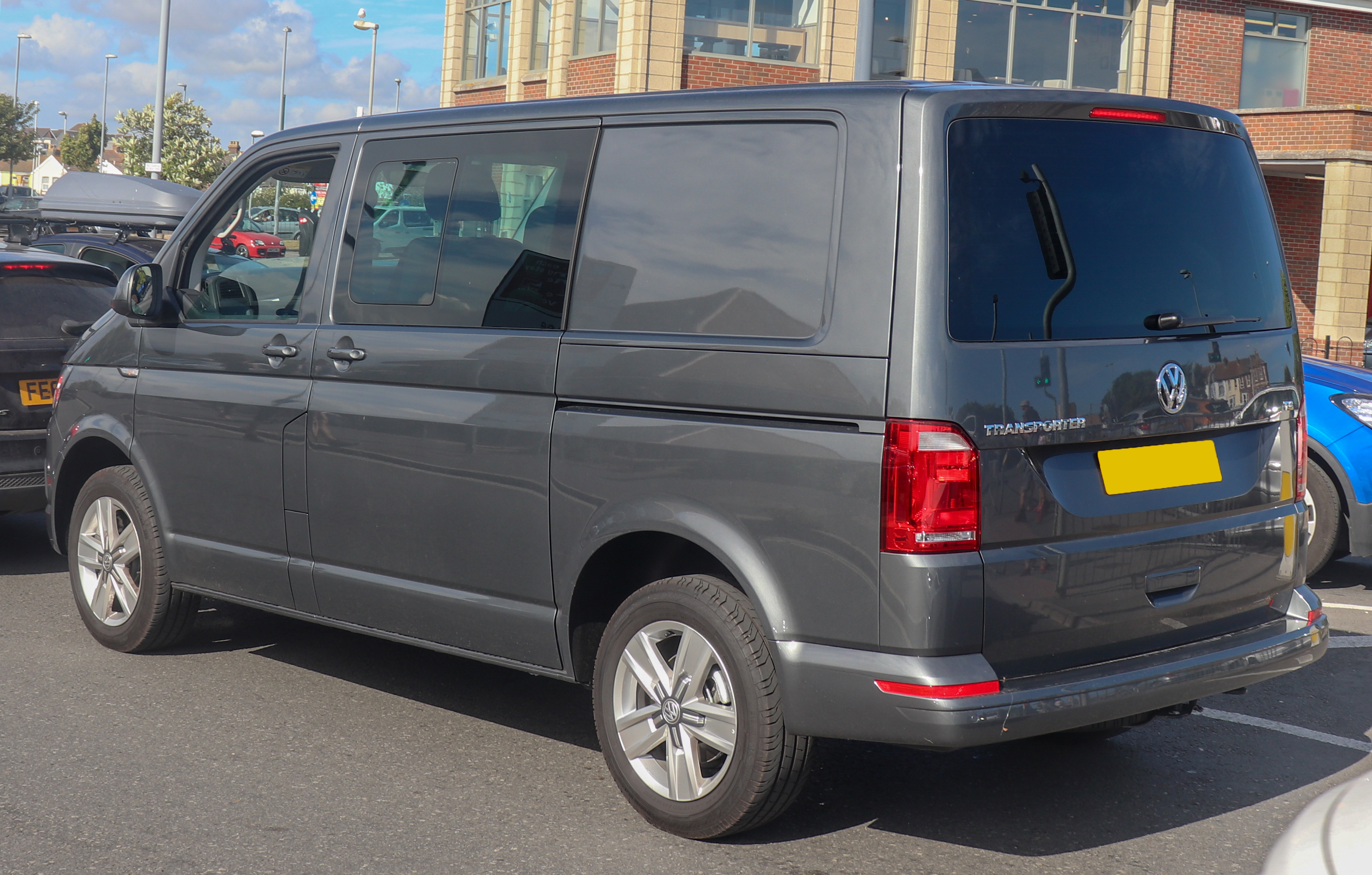
Volkswagen Transporter T32 Highline rear view

Still based on the T5's 7H / 7J platform, the T6 came with a wide range of revisions and updates, including a completely new dashboard layout (in two versions, standard and 'comfort'). The front end ahead of the windscreen was all new along with cosmetic revisions to the tailgate / rear doors and rear lights.

New options for the T6 included LED headlights, LED rear lights and a range of driver assistance and multimedia options.

=== Transporter T6.1 ===
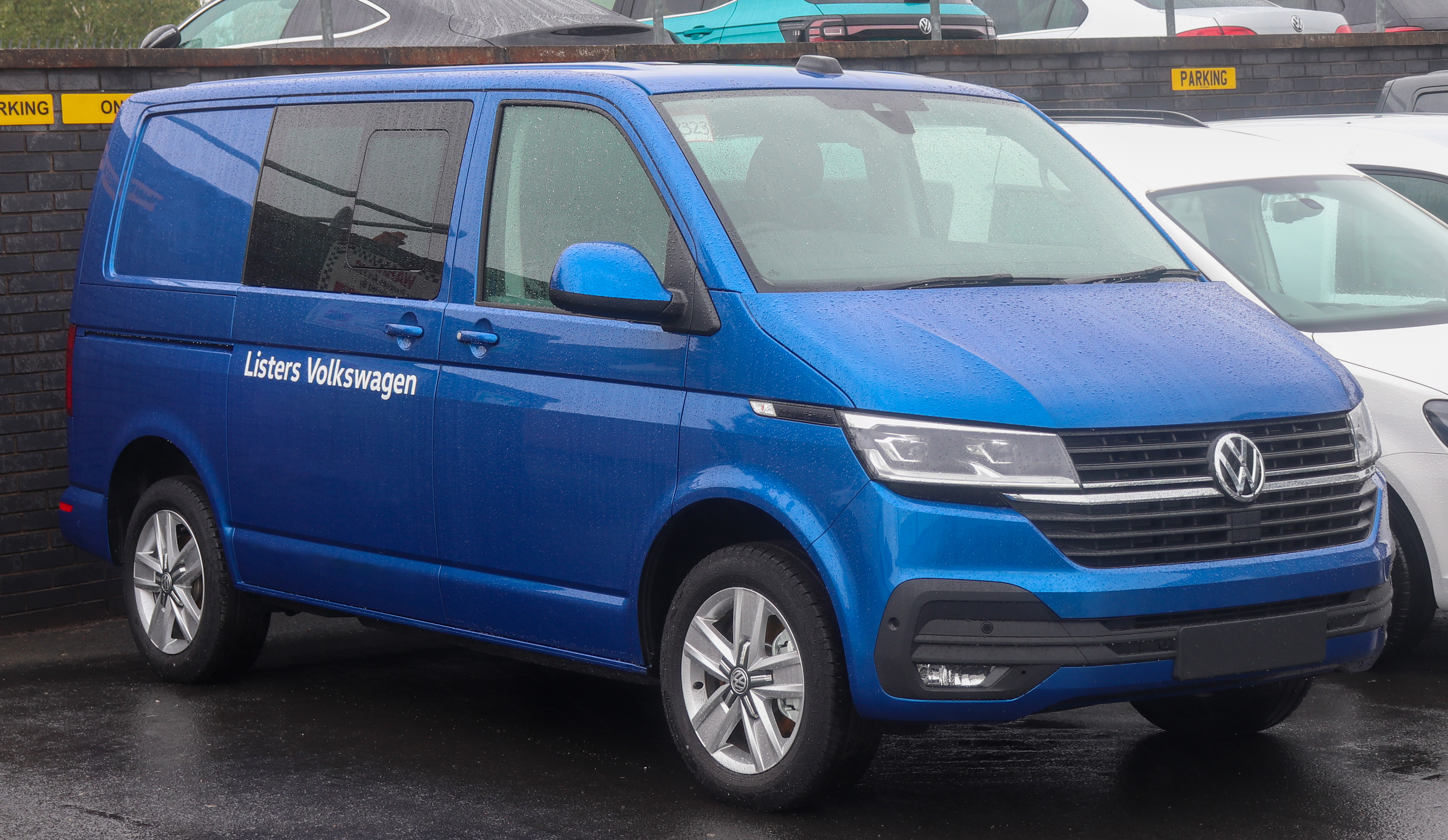
Volkswagen Transporter Kombi (T6.1) Highline

Volkswagen unveiled the updated T6.1 version of the T6 at the Geneva Motor Show in March 2019. Essentially a mid-cycle refresh, the main updates were electric power steering, which allows for the implementation of more driver assist functions compared to the T6. There were also minor styling updates in the form of a deeper front grille section. The T6.1 also has a new dashboard incorporating updated infotainment systems similar to those used in VW's passenger car range, and the ability to specify the "Virtual Cockpit" fully digital instrument cluster first seen on the Golf and Passat.

=== ABT e-Transporter ===
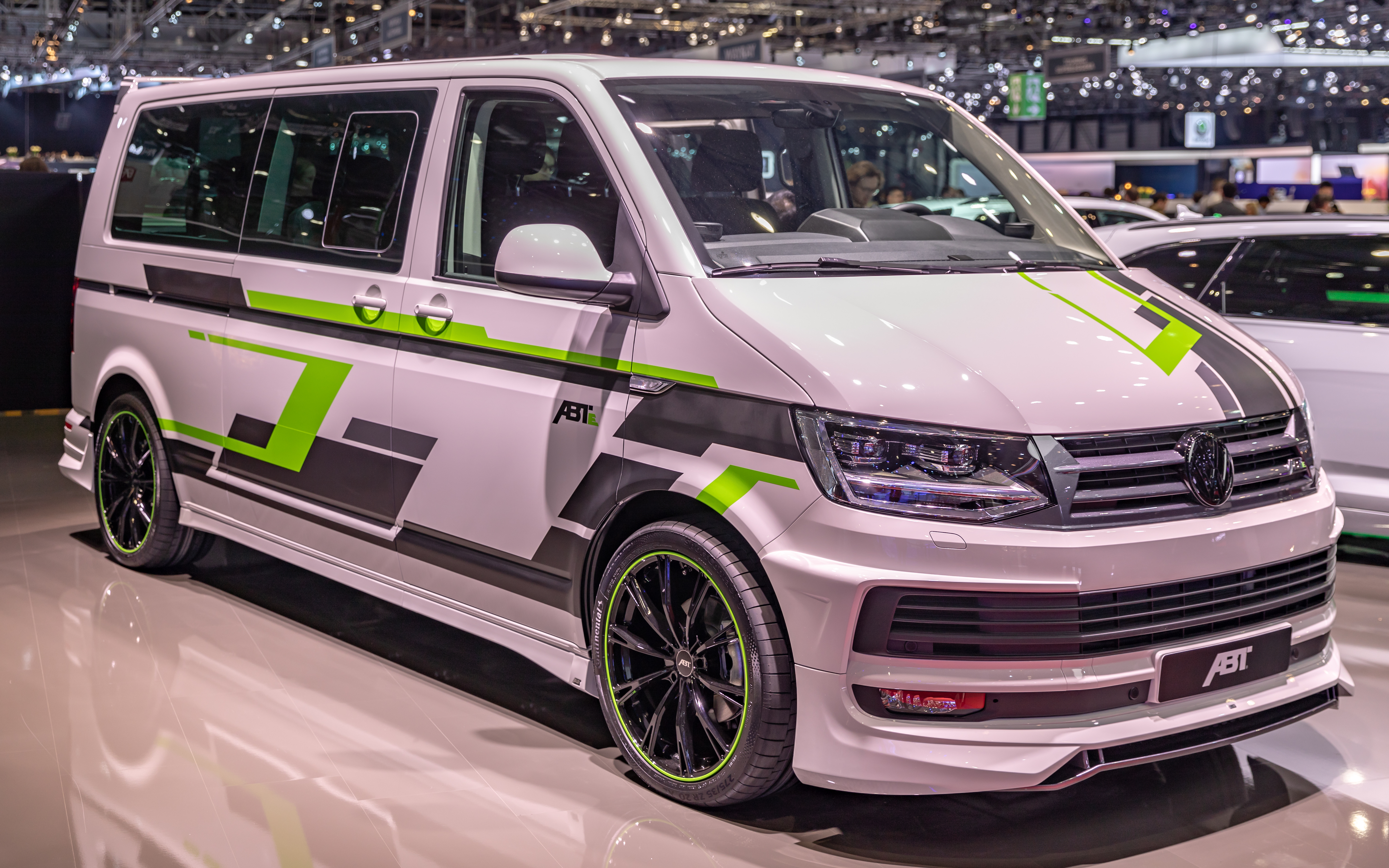
ABT e-Transporter prototype (2019, T6)

VW collaborated with ABT e-Line and introduced the ABT e-Transporter 6.1 in 2020 as a battery-electric version of the T6.1. The e-T6.1 is equipped with a single motor with 83 kW (111 hp) output drawing from a 37.3 kW-hr battery (33.6 kW-hr useable); under the WLTP test cycle, the tested range was 82 mi (132 km). It is based on the LWB T6.1 with standard roof and has a cargo capacity of up to 6.7 m^{3} (240 cu ft).

=== End of production and successors ===
The T6.1 Caravelle and Multivan were replaced by the Multivan T7 in 2022. The T6.1 remained Volkswagen's top-seller van into 2024, but due to European Union regulations, which require certified security against cyberattacks for new cars from 2024 on, the company chose to end the popular vehicle to spare the expense for redesigning the electronics. The T7 is based on the MQB platform and includes options for hybrid powertrains. In addition, the Multivan T7 is expected to displace the Touran and Sharan. Transporter commercial body styles will continue on the T6 platform.

== Powertrain ==
At launch, the engine range closely matched the previous generation T5 (2010 – 2016), but these were soon updated to newer, cleaner engines including new 110 kW (150 PS) TDi and 150 kW (204 PS) BiTDi diesels. All engines became Euro6 emissions compliant.

Towards the end of 2017, a new (to the Transporter) 2.0 TFSi engine became available, mirroring the motor industry's gradual move away from diesel engines.

Name	Displacement	Output		Transmissions				Drive		Consumption (combined)	Emissions (CO_{2})
Name	Displacement	Power	Torque	5sp Man	6sp Man	6sp Auto	7sp DSG	Front	4MOTION	Consumption (combined)	Emissions (CO_{2})
TDI340	1968 cc	103 kW; 138 hp @ 3500	340 N⋅m; 250 lb⋅ft @ 1750–2500								
TDI400	1968 cc	132 kW; 177 hp @ 4000	400 N⋅m; 300 lb⋅ft @ 1500–2000								
2.0TDI 90PS (Euro6D)	1968 cc	66 kW; 89 hp 90 PS @ 2750	220 N⋅m; 160 lb⋅ft @ 1250–2500	Yes	No	No	No	Yes	No	7.0–7.8 L/100 km 34–30 mpg_{‑US}	183–204 g/km 10.4–11.6 oz/mi
2.0TDI 102PS (Euro6D)	1968 cc	75 kW; 101 hp 102 PS @ 3000	250 N⋅m; 180 lb⋅ft @ 1500–2750	Yes	No	No	No	Yes	No	7.1–8.3 L/100 km 33–28 mpg_{‑US}	187–203 g/km 10.6–11.5 oz/mi
2.0TDI 110PS (Euro6D)	1968 cc	81 kW; 110 hp 110 PS @ 3200	250 N⋅m; 180 lb⋅ft @ 1250–3100	Yes	No	No	No	Yes	No	7.0–8.2 L/100 km 34–29 mpg_{‑US}	183–214 g/km 10.4–12.1 oz/mi
2.0TDI 150PS (Euro6D)	1968 cc	110 kW; 150 hp 150 PS @ 3250	340 N⋅m; 250 lb⋅ft @ 1500–3000	No	Yes	No	Yes	Yes	Yes	7.1–9.7 L/100 km 33–24 mpg_{‑US}	188–224 g/km 10.7–12.7 oz/mi
2.0BiTDI 199PS (Euro6D)	1968 cc	146 kW; 196 hp 199 PS @ 3800	450 N⋅m; 330 lb⋅ft @ 1400–2400	No	No	No	Yes	No	Yes	8.2–8.6 L/100 km 29–27 mpg_{‑US}	216–239 g/km 12.3–13.6 oz/mi
2.0BiTDI 204PS (Euro6B)	1968 cc	150 kW; 201 hp 204 PS @ 4000	450 N⋅m; 330 lb⋅ft @ 1400–2400	No	No	No	Yes	Yes	No	6.2–9.0 L/100 km 38–26 mpg_{‑US}	163–237 g/km 9.3–13.5 oz/mi
ABT e-Transporter	electric motor	81 kW; 110 hp 110 PS	200 N⋅m; 150 lb⋅ft	No	No	No	No	Yes	No	28.1–29.1 kW⋅h/100 km 75–72 mpg‑e	0 g/km 0 oz/mi

5 and 6 speed manual gearboxes from the previous generation were carried over, as was the 7 speed DSG gearbox.

4motion four wheel drive continued to be an option, becoming standard fitment with the 150 kW (204 PS) BiTDi engine as of 2018.

== Safety ==
ANCAP test results Volkswagen Transporter T6.1 van variants (2022)
Overall
Grading:	55% (Silver)

== Models ==
The Transporter T6 is offered in a variety of body styles, including as a panel van, motorhome ("California"), passenger ("Caravelle"/"Multivan" and "Shuttle"/"Window van"), combination cargo and passenger ("Kombi"), and chassis cab for a custom body or cargo bed. In addition, the T6 is available with either short- or long-wheelbase and either low, medium, or high roof; the high roof is only available in combination with the long-wheelbase.

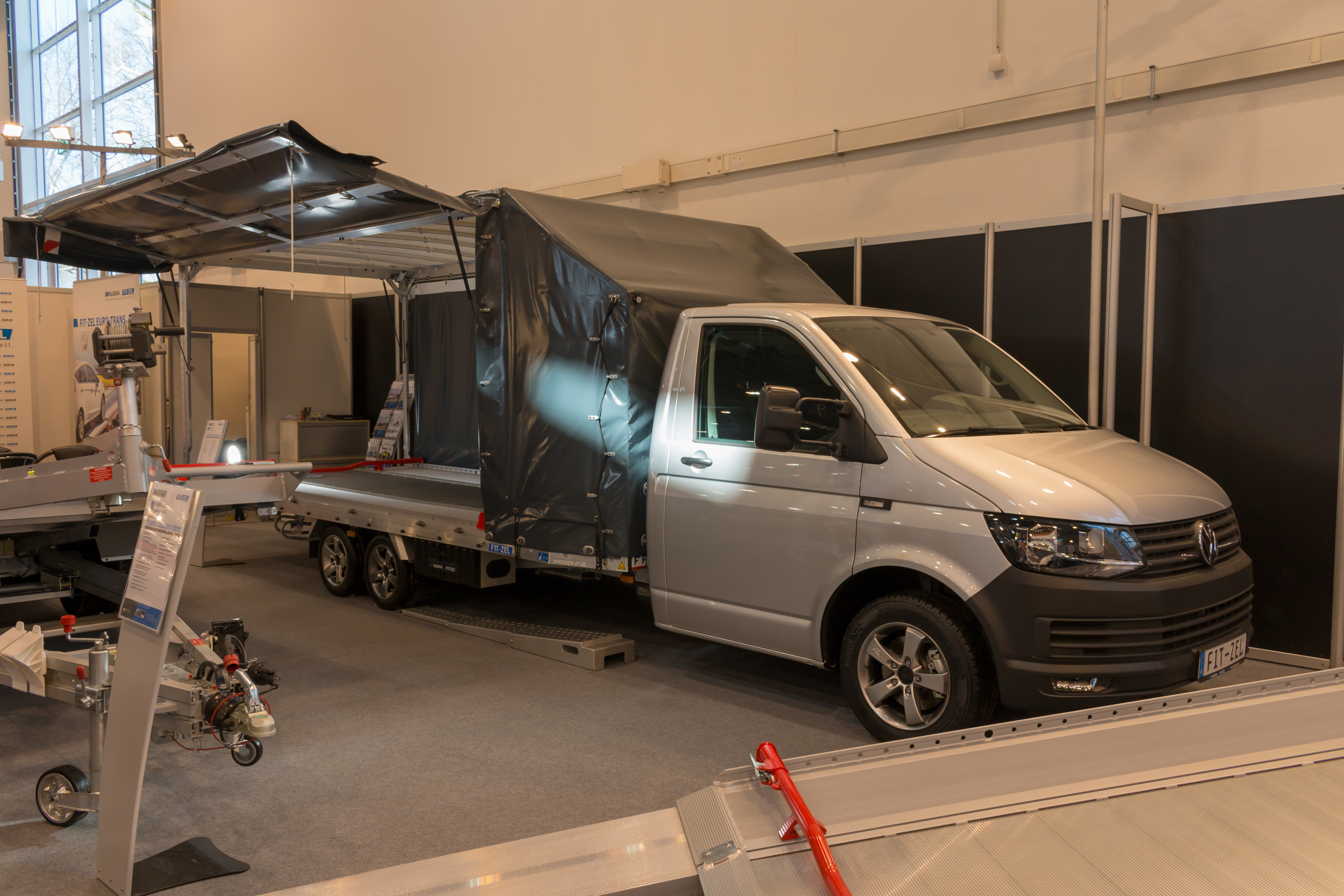
Chassis cab

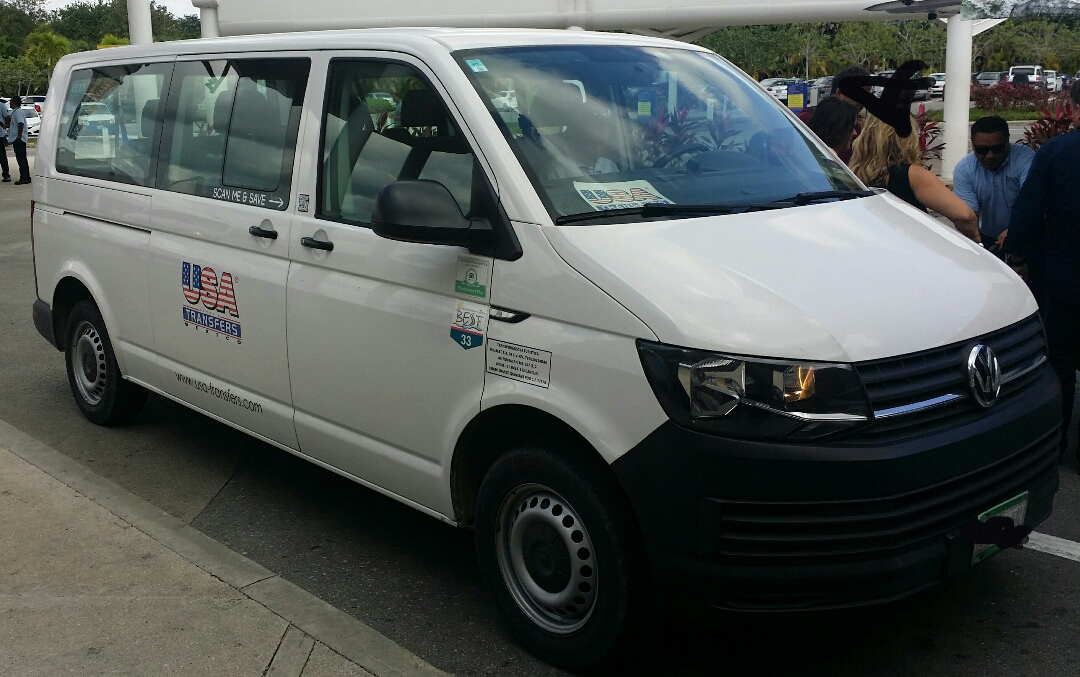
Shuttle

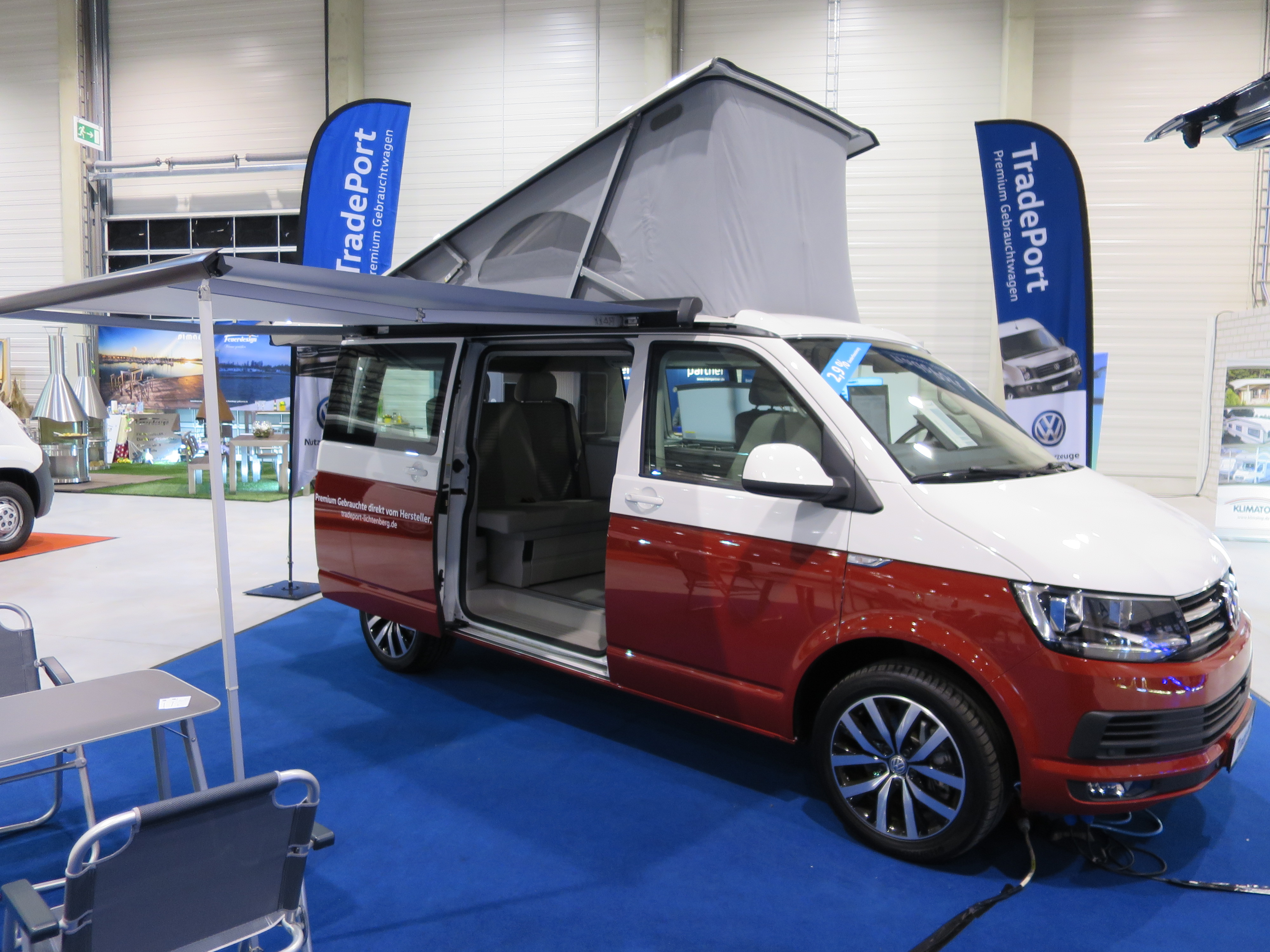
California "Ocean"

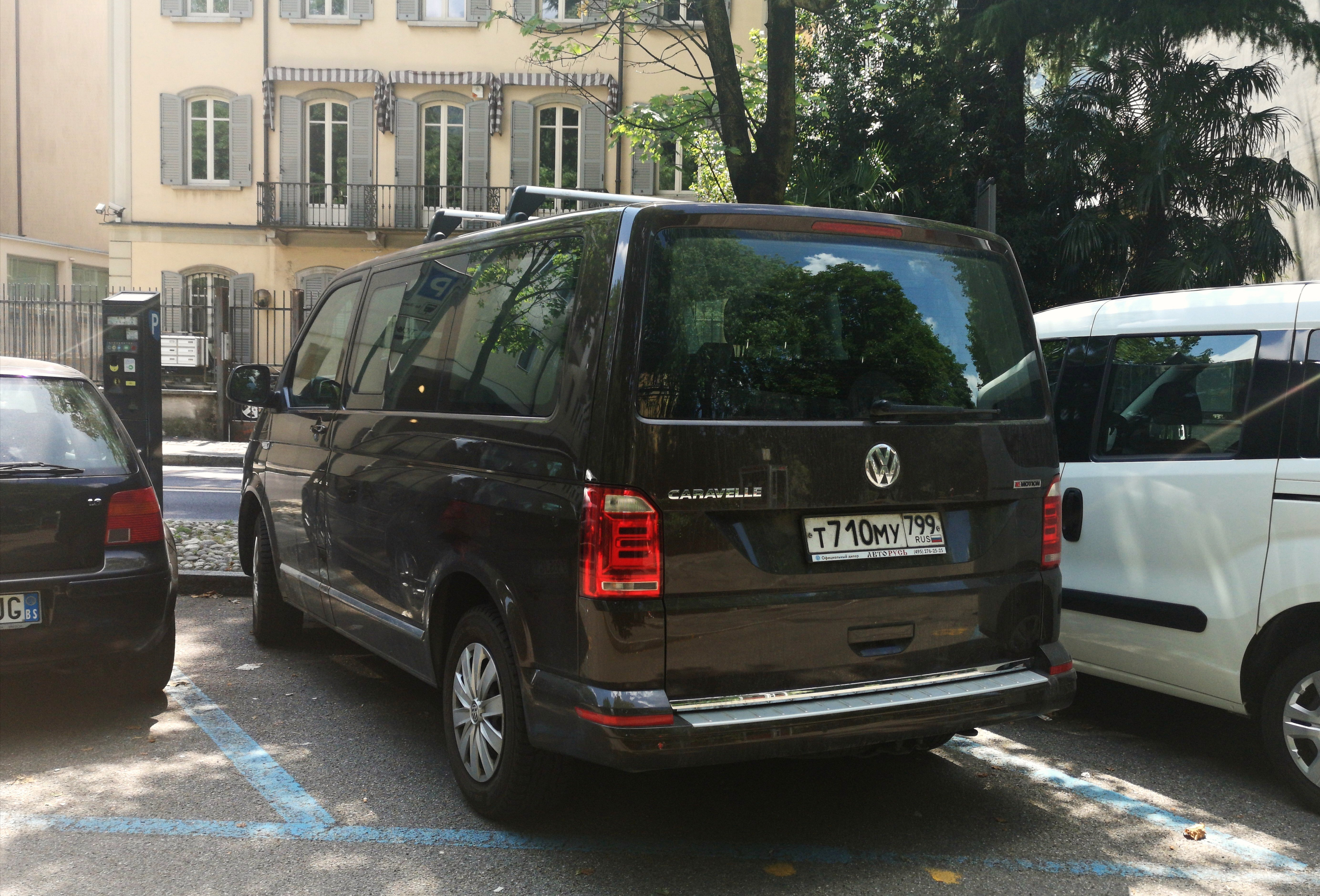
Caravelle

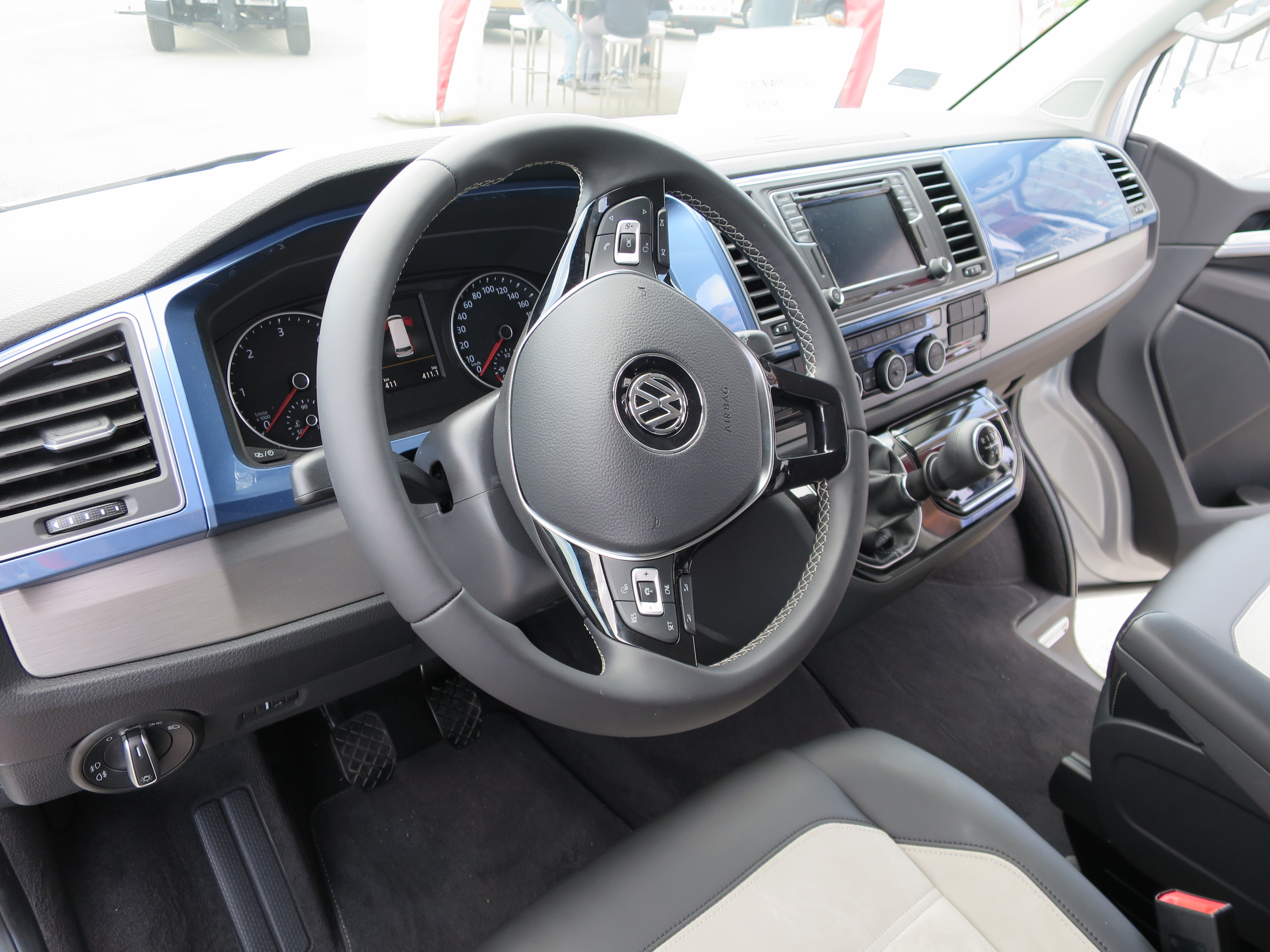
Dashboard

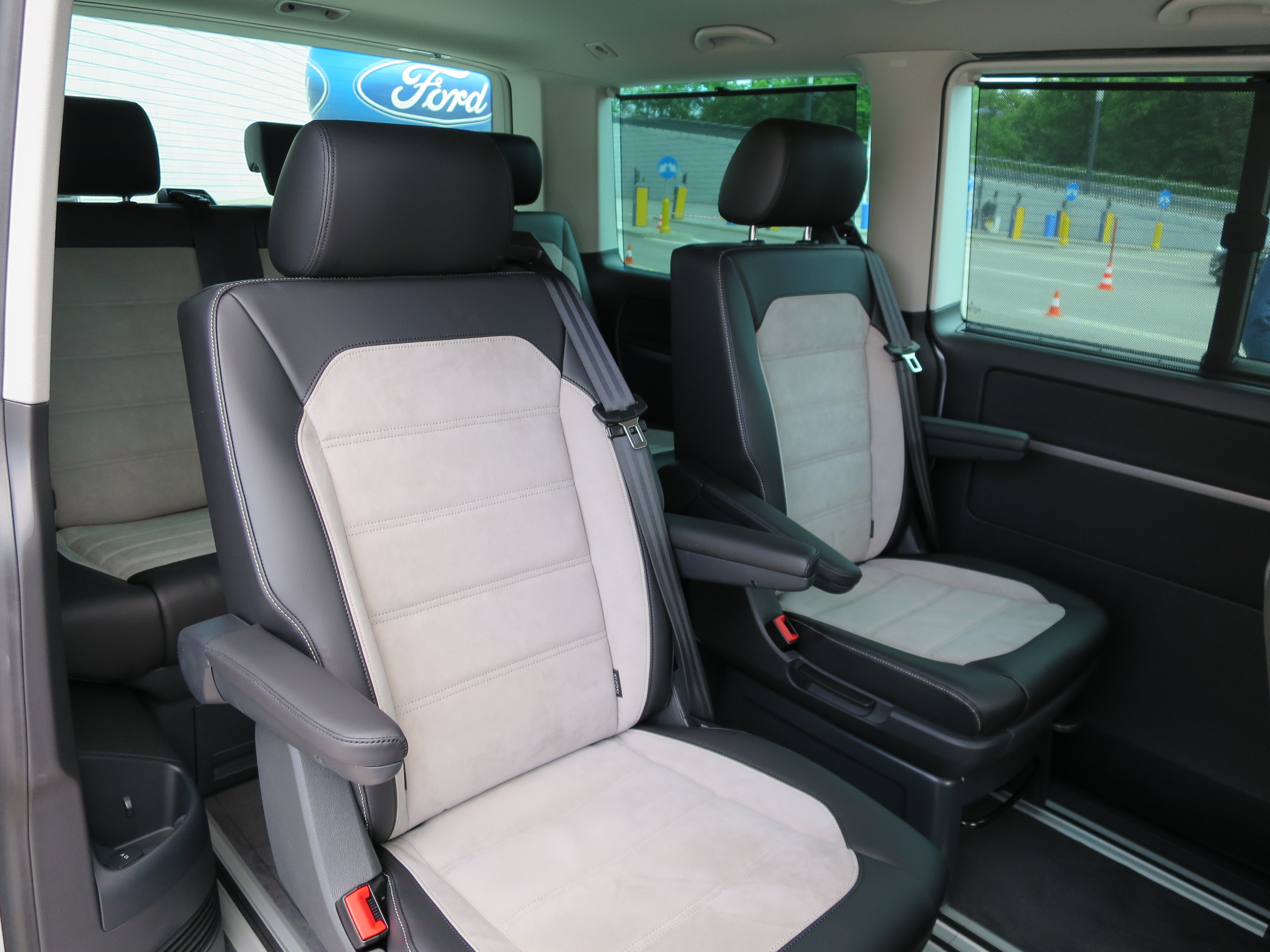
Caravelle/Multivan, interior

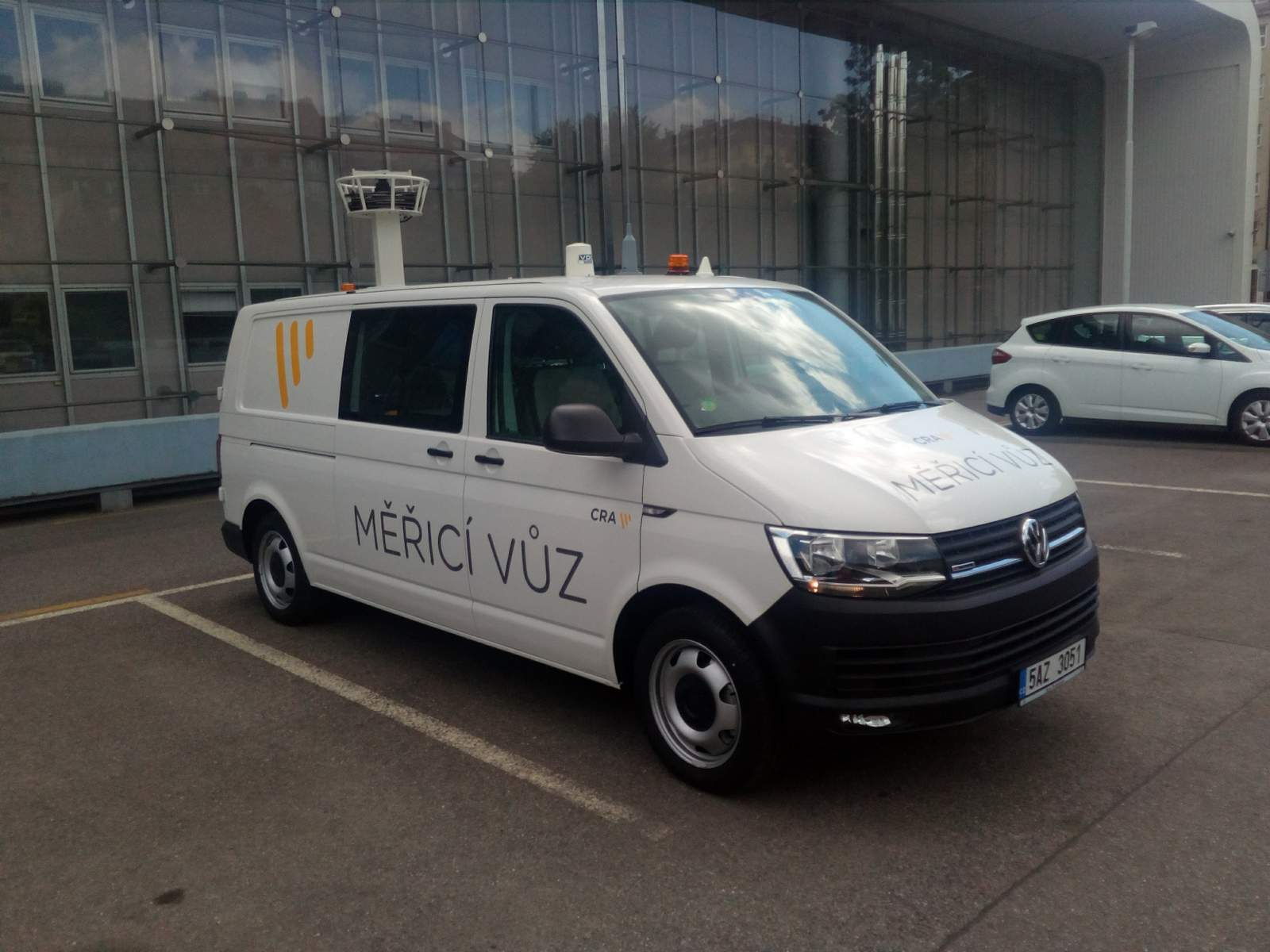
Kombi

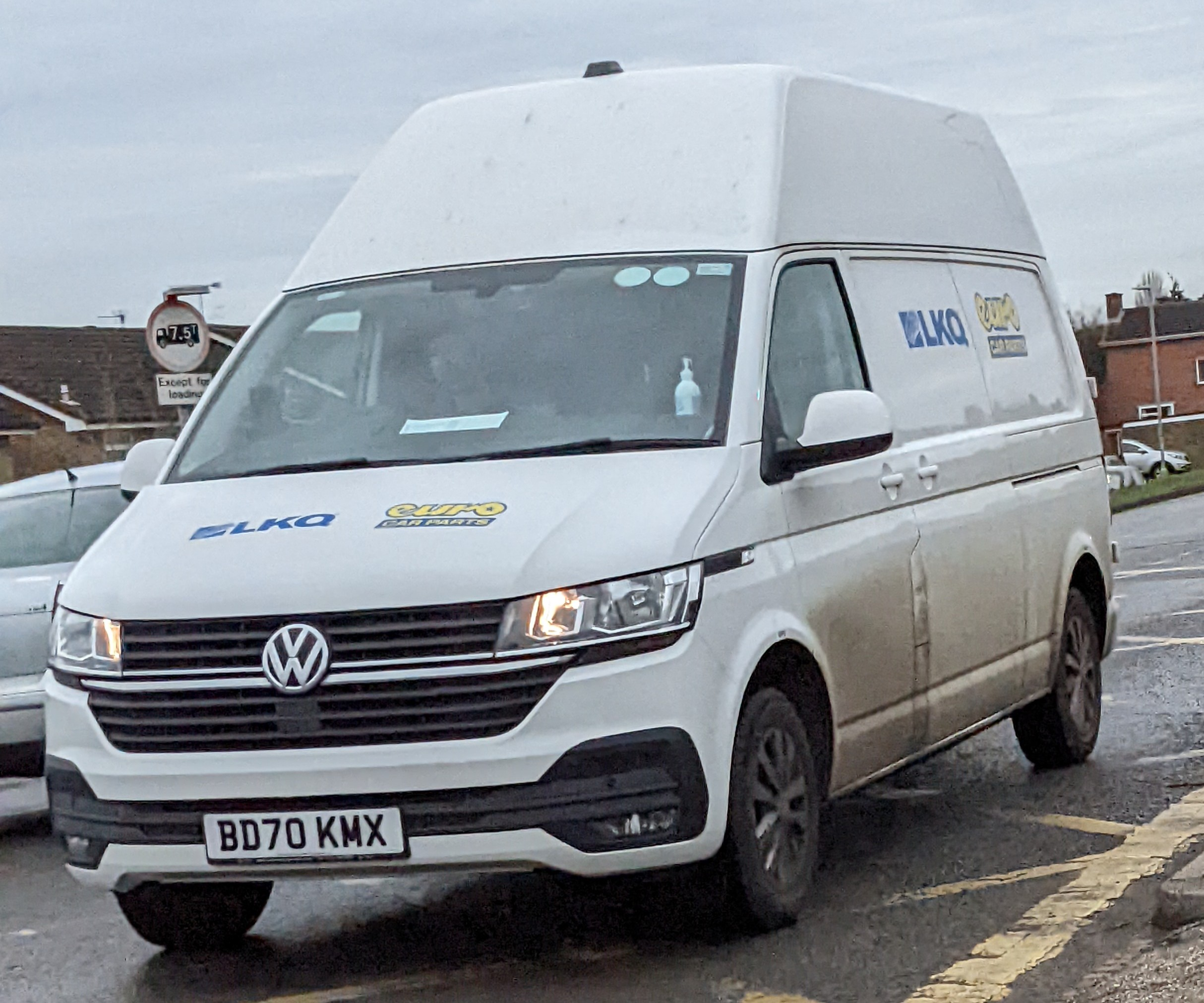
Panel van (T6.1), high roof

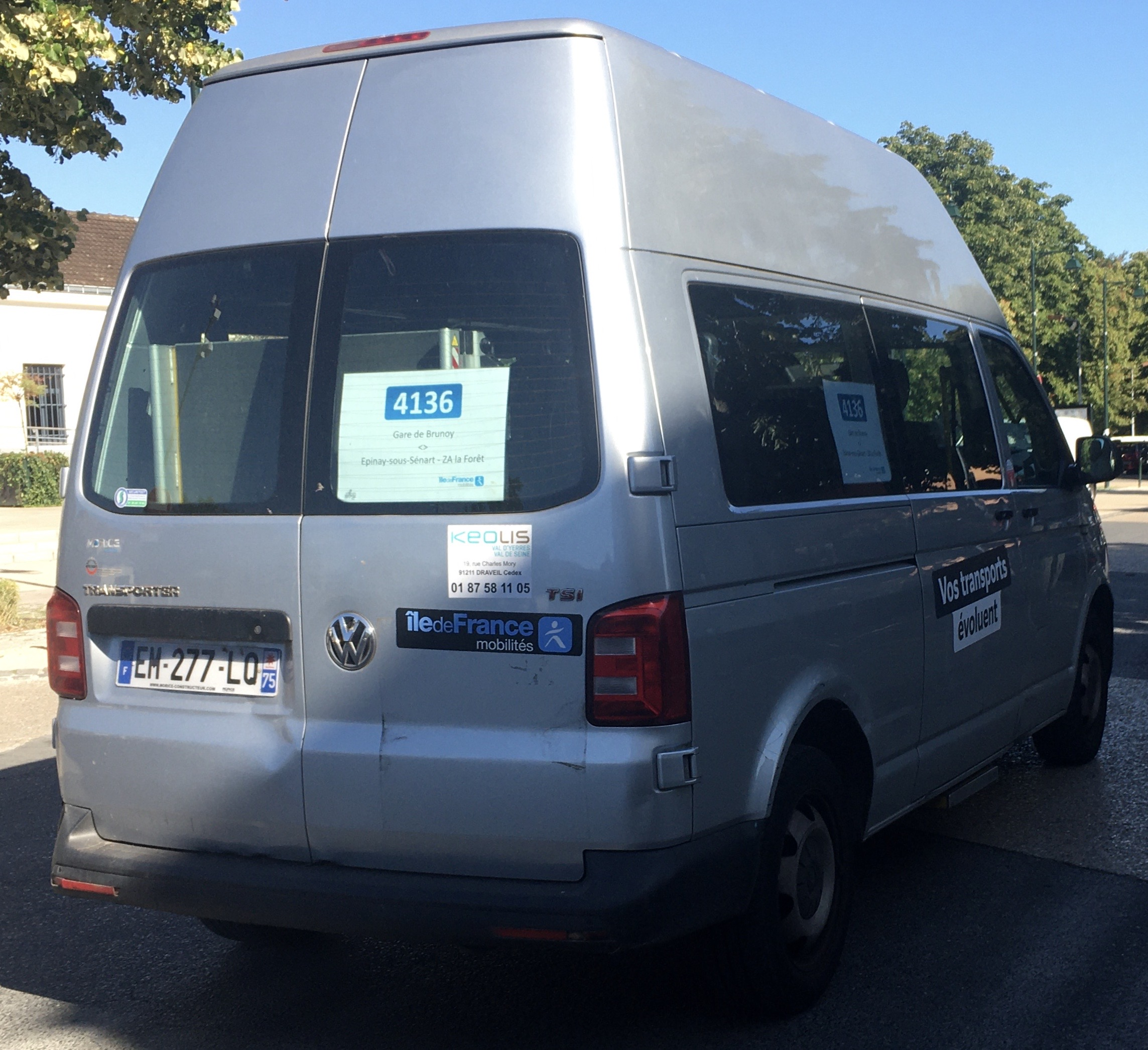
Rear of the vehicle (T6 2.0 TDI 150), high roof.

=== Cargo: Panel van and Kombi ===
Models are designated by maximum load, including the T26, with a maximum load of 2,600 kg (5,700 lb); T28, 2,800 kg (6,200 lb); T30, 3,000 kg (6,600 lb); and T32, 3,200 kg (7,100 lb). There were three trim levels available: Startline (base), Trendline (mid), and Highline (luxurious). The Kombi model (in some markets, "Crewvan") added a second row of three seats along with windows for the second row.

Transporter T6 combinations and load volumes
Wheelbase Roof height		Short	Long
Wheelbase Roof height		3,000 mm 120 in	3,400 mm 130 in
Low	1,990 mm 78 in	5.8 m^{3} 200 cu ft	6.7 m^{3} 240 cu ft
Low	1,990 mm 78 in	T26, (Note: T26 and T28 not available as Kombi; T30 LWB not available as Kombi.) T28, T30, T32	T28, T30, T32
Medium	2,176 mm 85.7 in	6.7 m^{3} 240 cu ft	7.8 m^{3} 280 cu ft
Medium	2,176 mm 85.7 in	T28, T30, T32	T28, T30, T32
High	2,476 mm 97.5 in	N/A	9.3 m^{3} 330 cu ft
High	2,476 mm 97.5 in	N/A	T28, T30, T32

=== Passenger: Caravelle, Multivan, and Shuttle ===
The Caravelle T6 is equipped with seven seats in three rows, windows all around, and leather seating surfaces; it is designed for luxurious passenger transport. It is available with either the short- or long-wheelbase and the standard-height roof. The second row includes two individual, swiveling seats and the third-row accommodates three, forward-facing. At its introduction, the Caravelle was available with a single color option, a two-tone red-and-white finish.

In Australia, the three-row Caravelle was branded as the Multivan, available with short- or long-wheelbase and seven seats. The Australian Caravelle was available in the long-wheelbase form only, and the interior was fitted with nine seats in four rows.

Like the Caravelle, the Shuttle T6 is equipped with windows at all three rows for passenger transport, but is intended for commercial for-hire services, and correspondingly is fitted with up to nine seats and hard-wearing surfaces. The standard seating accommodates eight in three rows, but the vehicle was available with just two seats in the front (as the "Transporter window van") if desired.

=== Chassis cab ===
The chassis cab model is available with either a single (one row of seats) or double (two rows) cab, in the long-wheelbase form only. Overall length is the same for both models; the loading platform is shortened on the double cab model accordingly.

=== Campervans ===
As with previous generations of the Transporter, the T6 is a popular platform to be converted into a campervan. T6 conversions commonly include a pop top roof to create extra headroom. The conversion can also include a bed platform, hob, sink and grille installation, along with additional storage.

Volkswagen also offers a factory made campervan called the California.
