= Caravan Salon =

Annual trade fair in Düsseldorf, Germany

- Genre: Trade fair (caravanning)
- Venue: Düsseldorf Exhibition Centre
- Location: Düsseldorf
- Country: Germany
- Years active: 1962–present
- Inaugurated: 1962
- Most recent: 28 August – 6 September 2026
- Next event: 27 August – 5 September 2027
- Attendance: 270,421 (2025)
- Organiser: Messe Düsseldorf
- Website: www.caravan-salon.de

The Caravan Salon (styled CARAVAN SALON) is an annual trade fair held at the Düsseldorf Exhibition Centre in Germany. Its exhibits are motorhomes, caravans and other recreational vehicles together with their equipment. It is organised by Messe Düsseldorf with the support of the German industry body Caravaning Industrie Verband (CIVD).

The 2025 edition recorded 810 exhibitors from 41 countries and 270,421 admissions.

== History ==
=== Origins in Essen ===
After the first caravans were built in the 1930s, caravanning had developed into a mass leisure activity by the 1960s. Messe Essen staged the first Caravan Salon in 1962, at which 61 exhibitors showed around 250 models. About 35,000 people attended in the first year, and attendance rose steadily thereafter.

Caravans were the original focus of the event. Motorhomes were exhibited for the first time in 1978 and subsequently came to dominate the show, a shift attributed to changing travel habits. Demand for motorhomes grew strongly during the 1980s, and the Caravan Salon became the largest event of its kind in Europe.

=== Move to Düsseldorf ===
The 32nd Caravan Salon, held in Essen in 1993, featured around 400 exhibitors. After repeated expansions the Essen site was no longer large enough, and in 1994 the fair moved to the exhibition grounds in Düsseldorf. Facilities there included a campsite with more than 1,000 pitches for visitors travelling in their own vehicles. The fair continued to grow over the following years.

=== COVID-19 pandemic and later editions ===
The 2020 and 2021 editions took place under hygiene measures and with capped visitor numbers, although interest in the fair persisted. In 2022 the Caravan Salon largely returned to its earlier format and recorded a record number of exhibitors, prompting an expansion by three additional halls.

In 2024 the number of exhibitors reached 778, with more than 250,000 visitors from 69 different countries. In 2025, 810 exhibitors from 41 countries took part and the fair recorded 270,421 admissions, the second-highest figure in its history.

== Related events ==
From 2003 a hiking and trekking fair was staged alongside the Caravan Salon. From 2021 its content was integrated into the themed areas of the Caravan Salon.

In 2012 the format was extended to China, where the spin-off fair All in Caravaning has since been held regularly in Beijing.

== See also ==
- Caravanning
- Recreational vehicle
- Messe Düsseldorf
