= Federal Inventory of Landscapes and Natural Monuments =

The Federal Inventory of Landscapes and Natural Monuments (German: Bundesinventar der Landschaften und Naturdenkmäler von nationaler Bedeutung, French: Inventaire fédéral des paysages, sites et monuments naturels d'importance nationale, or IFP) in Switzerland aims to protect landscapes of national importance. The inventory is part of a 1977 Ordinance of the Swiss Federal Council implementing the Federal Law on the Protection of Nature and Cultural Heritage.

The sites are of three types:

- Unique objects
- Typical landscapes
- Natural monuments

The inventory currently includes approx. 160 sites (1977: initially 65 sites, 1983: +55, 1996: +33, 1998: +9) covering 7806 km^{2} (approximately 20 percent of Switzerland).

== Inventory ==
| Site | Name | Since | Revised | Canton(s) |
|---|---|---|---|---|
| 1001 | Left shore of Lake Biel | 1977 | | Bern |
| 1002 | Le Chasseral | 1977 | | Bern, Neuchâtel |
| 1003 | Tourbière des Ponts-de-Martel | 1977 | | Neuchâtel |
| 1004 | Creux du Van and Gorges de l'Areuse | 1977 | | Neuchâtel, Vaud |
| 1005 | Vallée de la Brévine | 1977 | 1983 | Neuchâtel |
| 1006 | Vallée du Doubs | 1977 | 1998 | Jura, Neuchâtel |
| 1007 | La Dôle | 1977 | 1983 | Vaud |
| 1008 | Franches-Montagnes | 1977 | 1983 | Bern, Jura |
| 1009 | Gorges du Pichoux | 1977 | 1996 | Bern, Jura |
| 1010 | Weissenstein | 1977 | | Solothurn |
| 1011 | Lägerengebiet | 1977 | | Aargau, Zürich |
| 1012 | Belchen-Passwang-Gebiet | 1983 | 1996 | Basel-Landschaft, Solothurn |
| 1013 | Les Roches de Châtoillon | 1983 | 1998 | Neuchâtel |
| 1014 | Chassagne | 1983 | 1998 | Vaud |
| 1015 | Pied sud du Jura proche de La Sarraz | 1983 | | Vaud |
| 1016 | Aarewaage, Aarburg | 1996 | | Aargau, Solothurn |
| 1017 | Aargauer und östlicher Solothurner Faltenjura | 1996 | | Aargau, Solothurn |
| 1018 | Aareschlucht Brugg | 1996 | | Aargau |
| 1019 | Wasserschloss (confluence of Aare, Reuss, Limmat) | 1996 | | Aargau |
| 1020 | Ravellenflue and Chluser Roggen at Oensingen | 1996 | | Solothurn |
| 1021 | Gorges de Moutier | 1996 | | Bern |
| 1022 | Vallée de Joux and Haut-Jura vaudois | 1998 | | Vaud |
| 1023 | Le Mormont | 1998 | 1983 | Vaud |
| 1101 | Etangs de Bonfol and de Vendlincourt | 1977 | | Jura |
| 1102 | Randen | 1977 | | Schaffhausen |
| 1103 | Koblenzerlaufen | 1977 | | Aargau |
| 1104 | Tafeljura nördlich Gelterkinden | 1983 | 1996 | Basel-Landschaft |
| 1105 | Baselbieter und Fricktaler Tafeljura | 1983 | 1996 | Aargau, Basel-Landschaft, Solothurn |
| 1106 | Chilpen bei Diegten | 1983 | | Basel-Landschaft |
| 1107 | Gempenplateau | 1983 | | Basel-Landschaft, Solothurn |
| 1108 | Aargauer Tafeljura | 1996 | | Aargau |
| 1109 | Aarelandschaft bei Klingnau | 1996 | | Aargau |
| 1110 | Wangen- und Osterfingertal | 1996 | 1998 | Schaffhausen |
| 1201 | La Côte | 1977 | 1998 | Vaud |
| 1202 | Lavaux | 1977 | 1998 | Vaud |
| 1203 | Grèves vaudoises de la rive gauche du lac de Neuchâtel | 1977 | 1996 | Vaud |
| 1204 | Le Rhône genevois-Vallons de l'Allondon et de La Laire | 1977 | | Geneva |
| 1205 | Bois de Chênes | 1977 | | Vaud |
| 1206 | Coteaux de Cortaillod et de Bevaix | 1977 | 1998 | Neuchâtel |
| 1207 | Marais de la haute Versoix | 1977 | 1998 | Vaud |
| 1208 | South shore of Lake Neuchâtel | 1983 | | Bern, Fribourg, Neuchâtel, Vaud |
| 1209 | Mont Vully | 1983 | | Fribourg |
| 1210 | Chanivaz - delta de l'Aubonne | 1996 | | Vaud |
| 1301 | St. Petersinsel-Heidenweg | 1977 | 1996 | Bern |
| 1302 | Alte Aare/Alte Zihl | 1977 | | Bern |
| 1303 | Hallwilersee | 1977 | | Aargau, Lucerne |
| 1304 | Baldeggersee | 1977 | | Lucerne |
| 1305 | Reusslandschaft | 1977 | | Aargau |
| 1306 | Albiskette-Reppischtal | 1983 | | Zürich |
| 1307 | Glaziallandschaft zwischen Lorzentobel und Sihl mit Höhronenkette | 1993 | | Schwyz, Zürich |
| 1308 | Moorlandschaft Rothenthurm-Altmatt-Biberbrugg | 1983 | | Schwyz, Zug |
| 1309 | Zugersee | 1983 | | Lucerne, Schwyz, Zug |
| 1310 | Gletschergarten Luzern | 1983 | | Lucerne |
| 1311 | Napfbergland | 1983 | 1996 | Bern, Lucerne |
| 1312 | Wässermatten in den Tälern der Langete, der Rot und der Önz | 1983 | | Bern, Lucerne |
| 1313 | Steinhof-Steinenberg-Burgäschisee | 1983 | | Bern, Solothurn |
| 1314 | Aarelandschaft Thun-Bern | 1983 | | Bern |
| 1315 | Amsoldinger- und Uebeschisee | 1983 | | Bern |
| 1316 | Stausee Niederried | 1983 | | Bern |
| 1317 | Endmoränenzone von Staffelbach | 1996 | | Aargau |
| 1318 | Wauwilermoos-Hagimoos-Mauensee | 1996 | | Lucerne |
| 1319 | Aareknie Wolfwil-Wynau | 1996 | | Bern, Solothurn |
| 1320 | Schwarzenburgerland mit Sense- und Schwarzwasser-Schluchten | 1996 | | Bern, Fribourg |
| 1321 | Emmentallandschaft mit Räbloch, Schopfgraben und Rämisgummen | 1996 | | Bern |
| 1401 | Drumlinlandschaft Zürcher Oberland | 1977 | | Zürich |
| 1402 | Imenberg | 1977 | 1983 | Thurgau |
| 1403 | Glaziallandschaft zwischen Thur und Rhein mit Nussbaumer Seen und Andelfinger Seenplatte | 1977 | | Thurgau, Zürich |
| 1404 | Glaziallandschaft Neerach-Stadel | 1977 | | Zürich |
| 1405 | Frauenwinkel-Ufenau-Lützelau | 1977 | 1996 | Schwyz |
| 1406 | Zürcher Obersee | 1977 | | Schwyz, St. Gallen |
| 1407 | Katzenseen | 1977 | | Zürich |
| 1408 | Unteres Fällander Tobel | 1977 | | Zürich |
| 1409 | Pfäffikersee | 1977 | | Zürich |
| 1410 | Irchel | 1977 | | Zürich |
| 1411 | Untersee-Hochrhein | 1983 | | Schaffhausen, Thurgau, Zürich |
| 1412 | Rheinfall | 1983 | | Schaffhausen, Zürich |
| 1413 | Thurgauisch-fürstenländische Kulturlandschaft mit Hudelmoos | 1983 | 1996 | St. Gallen, Thurgau |
| 1414 | Thurlandschaft Lichtensteig-Schwarzenbach | 1983 | | St. Gallen |
| 1415 | Böllenbergtobel bei Uznach | 1983 | | St. Gallen |
| 1416 | Kaltbrunner Riet | 1983 | | St. Gallen |
| 1417 | Lützelsee-Seeweidsee-Uetziker Riet | 1983 | | Zürich |
| 1418 | Espi-Hölzli | 1983 | | Thurgau |
| 1419 | Pfluegstein ob Erlenbach | 1983 | | Zürich |
| 1420 | Hörnli-Bergland (Quellgebiete der Töss und der Murg) | 1996 | | St. Gallen, Thurgau, Zürich |
| 1501 | Gelten-Iffigen | 1977 | 1998 | Bern |
| 1502 | Les Grangettes | 1977 | 1998 | Vaud |
| 1503/1713 | Diablerets-Vallon de Nant-Derborence (western part) | 1977 | 1996/98 | Vaud, Valais |
| 1504 | Vanil Noir | 1977 | | Fribourg, Vaud |
| 1505 | Hohgant | 1977 | | Bern |
| 1506 | Chaltenbrunnenmoor-Wandelalp | 1977 | 1996 | Bern |
| 1507/1706 | Berner Hochalpen und Aletsch-Bietschhorn-Gebiet (northern part) | 1983 | | Bern, Valais |
| 1508 | Weissenau Castle | 1983 | | Bern |
| 1509 | Luegibodenblock | 1983 | 1998 | Bern |
| 1510 | La Pierreuse-Gummfluh-Vallée de l'Etivaz | 1983 | | Bern, Vaud |
| 1511 | Giessbach | 1996 | | Bern |
| 1512 | Aareschlucht Innertkirchen-Meiringen | 1996 | | Bern |
| 1513 | Engstligenfälle with Engstligenalp | 1996 | | Bern |
| 1514 | Breccaschlund | 1996 | | Fribourg |
| 1515 | Tour d'Aï-Dent de Corjon | 1998 | | Fribourg, Vaud |
| 1601 | Silberen | 1977 | | Glarus, Schwyz |
| 1602 | Murgtal-Mürtschental | 1977 | | Glarus, St. Gallen |
| 1603 | Maderanertal-Fellital | 1977 | | Uri |
| 1604 | Lauerzersee | 1977 | | Schwyz |
| 1605 | Pilatus | 1977 | | Lucerne, Nidwalden, Obwalden |
| 1606 | Lake Lucerne with Kernwald, Bürgenstock and Rigi | 1983 | | Lucerne, Nidwalden, Obwalden, Schwyz, Uri |
| 1607 | Bergsturzgebiet von Goldau | 1983 | | Schwyz, Zug |
| 1608 | Flyschlandschaft Hagleren-Glaubenberg-Schlieren | 1983 | | Lucerne, Obwalden |
| 1609 | Schrattenflue | 1983 | | Lucerne |
| 1610 | Scheidnössli bei Erstfeld | 1983 | | Uri |
| 1611 | Lochseite bei Schwanden | 1983 | | Glarus |
| 1612 | Säntisgebiet | 1996 | | Appenzell Ausserrhoden, Appenzell Innerrhoden, St. Gallen |
| 1613 | Speer-Churfirsten-Alvier | 1996 | | St. Gallen |
| 1614 | Taminaschlucht | 1996 | | St. Gallen |
| 1615 | Melser Hinterberg-Flumser Kleinberg | 1996 | | St. Gallen |
| 1701 | Binntal | 1977 | | Valais |
| 1702 | Lac de Tanay | 1977 | | Valais |
| 1703 | Val de Bagnes | 1977 | | Valais |
| 1704 | Mont d'Orge près de Sion | 1977 | | Valais |
| 1705 | Valère et Tourbillon | 1977 | 1998 | Valais |
| 1706/1507 | Berner Hochalpen und Aletsch-Bietschhorn-Gebiet (southern part) | 1983 | 1998 | Valais |
| 1707 | Dent Blanche-Matterhorn-Monte Rosa | 1983 | | Valais |
| 1708 | Pyramides d'Euseigne | 1983 | | Valais |
| 1709 | Blocs erratiques au-dessus de Monthey et de Collombey | 1983 | | Valais |
| 1710 | Rhonegletscher mit Vorgelände | 1996 | 1998 | Valais |
| 1711 | Raron-Heidnischbiel | 1996 | | Valais |
| 1712 | Les Follatères-Mont du Rosel | 1996 | | Valais |
| 1713/1503 | Diablerets-Vallon de Nant-Derborence (eastern part) | 1996 | | Valais |
| 1714 | Bergij-Platten | 1998 | | Valais |
| 1715 | Gorges du Trient | 1998 | | Valais |
| 1716 | Pfynwald-Illgraben | 1998 | | Valais |
| 1717 | Laggintal-Zwischbergental | 1998 | | Valais |
| 1718 | Val de Réchy-Sasseneire | 1998 | | Valais |
| 1801 | Piora-Lucomagno-Dötra | 1977 | | Ticino |
| 1802 | Delta del Ticino e della Verzasca | 1977 | | Ticino |
| 1803 | Monte Generoso | 1977 | | Ticino |
| 1804 | Monte San Giorgio | 1977 | | Ticino |
| 1805 | Monte Caslano | 1977 | | Ticino |
| 1806 | Ponte Brolla-Losone | 1977 | | Ticino |
| 1807 | Val Verzasca | 1983 | | Ticino |
| 1808 | Val Bavona | 1983 | | Ticino |
| 1809 | Campolungo-Campo Tencia-Piumogna | 1983 | | Ticino |
| 1810 | Monte San Salvatore | 1983 | | Ticino |
| 1811 | Arbòstora-Morcote | 1983 | | Ticino |
| 1812 | Gandria e dintorni | 1983 | | Ticino |
| 1813 | Denti della Vecchia | 1983 | | Ticino |
| 1814 | Paesaggio fluviale e antropico della Valle del Sole (Blenio) | 1996 | | Ticino |
| 1901 | Lag da Toma | 1977 | | Grisons |
| 1902 | Ruinaulta | 1977 | | Grisons |
| 1903 | Auenlandschaft am Unterlauf des Hinterrheins | 1977 | | Grisons |
| 1904 | Val di Campo | 1977 | | Grisons |
| 1905 | Kesch-Ducan-Gebiet | 1977 | | Grisons |
| 1906 | Trockengebiet im unteren Domleschg | 1977 | | Grisons |
| 1907 | Quellgebiet des Hinterrheins und San Bernardino Passhöhe | 1977 | | Grisons |
| 1908 | Oberengadiner Seenlandschaft und Bernina-gruppe | 1983 | | Grisons |
| 1909 | Piz Arina | 1983 | | Grisons |
| 1910 | Silvretta-Vereina | 1983 | | Grisons |
| 1911 | Tomalandschaft bei Domat/Ems | 1983 | | Grisons |
| 1912 | Paludi del San Bernardino | 1996 | | Grisons |
| 1913 | Greina-Piz Medel | 1996 | | Grisons, Ticino |
| 1914 | Plasseggen-Schijenflue | 1996 | | Grisons |
| 1915 | Schweizerischer Nationalpark und Randgebiete | 1996 | | Grisons |
| 1916 | Val Bondasca-Val da l'Albigna | 1998 | | Grisons |

== History ==
Between 1958 and 1963, the Swiss League for the Protection of Nature, together with the Swiss Heritage Society and the Swiss Alpine Club, established an inventory of landscapes and natural sites of national importance. Based on it, the Swiss Confederation published the Federal Inventory of Landscapes and Natural Monuments in 1977.

== See also ==
- Environmental movement in Switzerland
- Nature parks in Switzerland
