= ISO (disambiguation) =

ISO is the International Organization for Standardization, an international standards development organization.

- List of ISO standards

ISO, iso, or Iso may also refer to:

== Business and finance ==
- Iso Omena ("Big Apple"), a shopping center in Finland
- Incentive stock option, a type of employee stock option
- Independent Sales Organization, a company that partners with an acquiring bank to provide merchant services
- Insurance Services Office, an American insurance underwriter
- Intermarket sweep order, a type of limit order on financial markets
- Iso (automobile), an Italian car manufacturer

== Arts and entertainment ==
- Isomorphic Algorithms (ISO's), a fictional race in the digital world of Tron: Legacy
- Iso (comics), a Marvel comics character

=== Music ===
- Iso (album), a 1994 studio album by Ismaël Lô
- Iceland Symphony Orchestra
- Indianapolis Symphony Orchestra, Indiana, United States
- International Symphony Orchestra, of Sarnia, Ontario and Port Huron, Michigan, United States

== Organizations ==
- Imamia Students Organisation, an Islamic organization in Pakistan
- Independent system operator, a North American organization that coordinates, controls and monitors the operation of the electrical power system
- Internal Security Organisation, a government security agency in Uganda
- International Socialist Organization, an American Trotskyist organization, active from 1976 to 2019
- International Socialist Organisation (Australia), an Australian Trotskyist organization, active from 1971 to 2008
- International Socialist Organisation (Germany), a German Trotskyist organisation, established in 2016
- International Socialist Organisation (New Zealand), a New Zealand Trotskyist organization, founded in the early 1990s
- Interstedelijk Studenten Overleg (Dutch National Students Association), the Netherlands
- Iran Scout Organization, a youth organization in Iran

== People ==
- Mitsuo Iso (磯 光雄; born 1966), Japanese animator
- Iso Mutsu (睦磯; 1867–1930), British writer
- Tomiaki Iso (礒 富昭; born 1954), Japanese rower
- Volmari Iso-Hollo (1907–1969), Finnish athlete
- Iso Lero "Džamba", Yugoslav criminal
- Jean-Paul Appel, also known as Iso, leader of the UFO religion Siderella

== Places ==
- Iso-Heikkilä, a district in Turku, Finland
- Iso-Naakkima, a lake in Finland
- Iso-Roine, a lake in Finland

== Science and technology ==
- ISO character set (disambiguation)
- ISO base media file format, a container format for time-based multimedia files
- ISO 5800, a film speed system
  - Digital camera ISO, the light sensitivity of a digital image sensor
- ISO 8601, a date format
- ISO(n), the Euclidean group
- Isopropyl alcohol, the simplest secondary alcohol
- Infrared Space Observatory, a space telescope active from 1995 to 1998
- International Science Olympiad, a series of science competitions for students
- Iso (fish), a genus of surf sardines in the family Notocheiridae
- Isomer, chemicals with the same chemical formula but different structures
- Isorhapontigenin, a stilbenoid (chemical)
- Isotonitazene, a benzimidazole-derived opioid analgesic drug, colloquially referred to as "iso"
- Optical disc image (ISO image), a file containing the whole contents of an optical disc
- ISO, or integumentary sensory organ

== Other uses ==
- Imperial Service Order, an award in the British honours system
- Isolated Power, a sabermetrics baseball statistic
- Iso (American football), a type of play used in American football
- ISO (dinghy), a class of sailing dinghy
- Iso (basketball play), short for isolation
- In search of, in texting and internet slang the phrase "in search of" is often abbreviated as iso List of acronyms: I
- Isoko language (ISO 639-3 code: iso)
- Kinston Regional Jetport, North Carolina, United States (IATA code: ISO)

== See also ==
- Isometric (disambiguation)
- ISOS (disambiguation)
