= Isos =

Isos or ISOS may refer to:

- Isos (Boeotia), a town of ancient Boeotia, Greece
- Isos (Megaris), a town of ancient Megaris, Greece
- Isos Sinasos, a Greek dance
- In Search of Sunrise (series), a trance/house mix-compilation music CD series by Tiësto
- Integrated School of Ocean Sciences, a post-graduate school for marine scientists in Kiel, Germany
- Inventory of Swiss Heritage Sites, part of a 1981 Ordinance of the Swiss Federal Council implementing the Federal Law on the Protection of Nature and Cultural Heritage

== See also ==
- ISO (disambiguation)
- Issos (disambiguation)
