= Schweiz 5 =

- Country: Switzerland
- Broadcast area: Switzerland
- Headquarters: Aarburg, Switzerland

Programming
- Language: Swiss German
- Picture format: 576i (16:9 SDTV); 1080i (HDTV)

History
- Launched: 1 March 2004; 21 years ago
- Former names: U1 TV

Links
- Website: www.schweiz5.ch

Schweiz 5 is a privately owned TV channel in German-speaking Switzerland.
