= Le Grammont =

Mountain in Switzerland

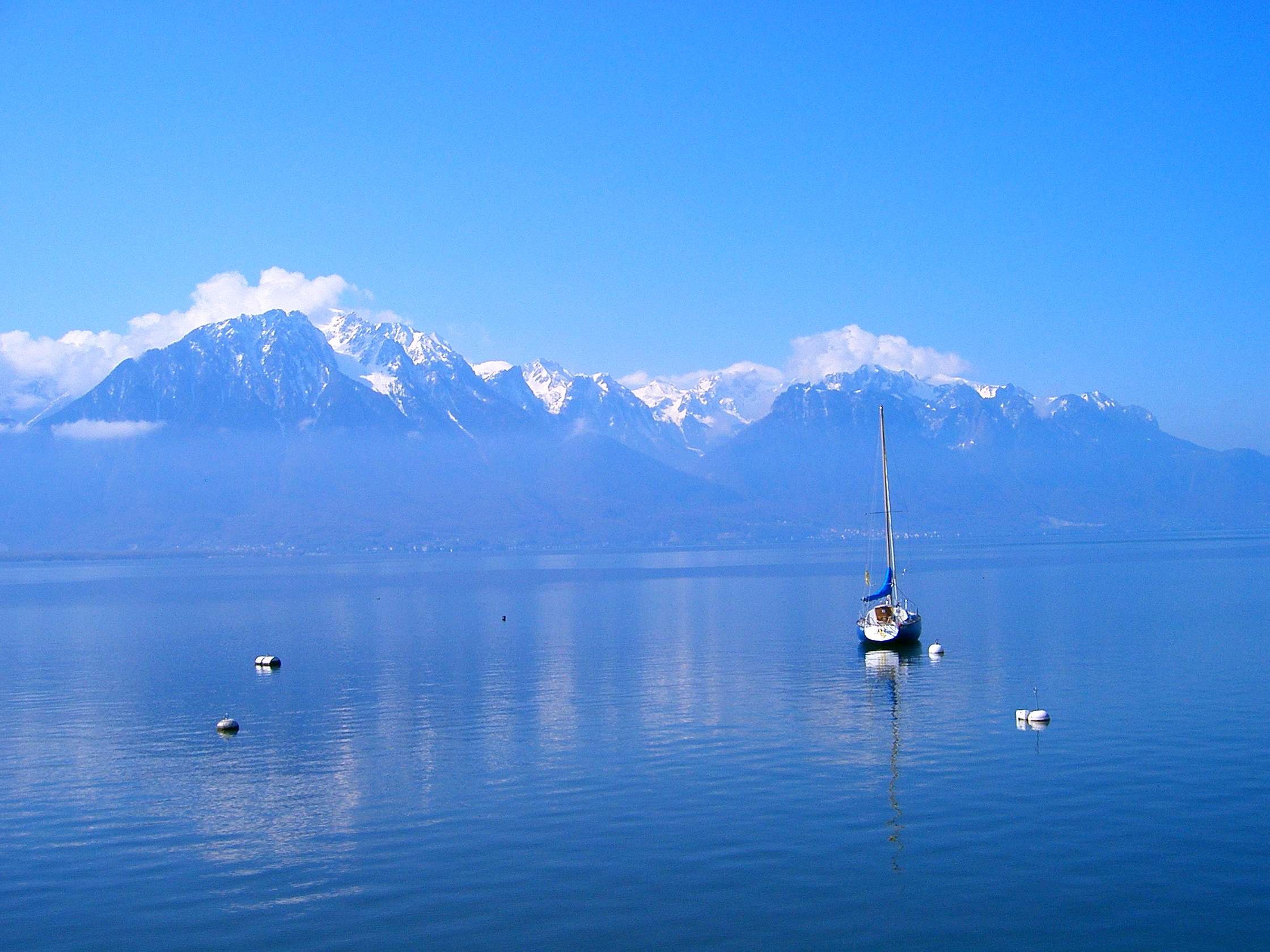
- Le Grammont (left) seen from Montreux

Highest point
- Elevation: 2,172 m (7,126 ft)
- Prominence: 201 m (659 ft)
- Parent peak: Les Jumelles
- Coordinates: 46°21′26.9″N 6°49′16.2″E

Geography
- Location within Switzerland
- Main peaks in Chablais Alps Mouse over (or touch) gives more detail of peaks. Location in Switzerland
- Location: Valais, Switzerland
- Parent range: Chablais Alps

Climbing
- Easiest route: Trail

Le Grammont (French pronunciation: [lə ɡʁamɔ̃]) is a mountain in the Chablais Alps, near Le Bouveret in Valais. At 2,172 metres (7,126 feet) above sea level, it is one of the highest peaks overlooking Lake Geneva. Various trails lead to the summit, mostly from the southern side.

On the way to the summit, there is a mountain lake, the Lac de Taney.

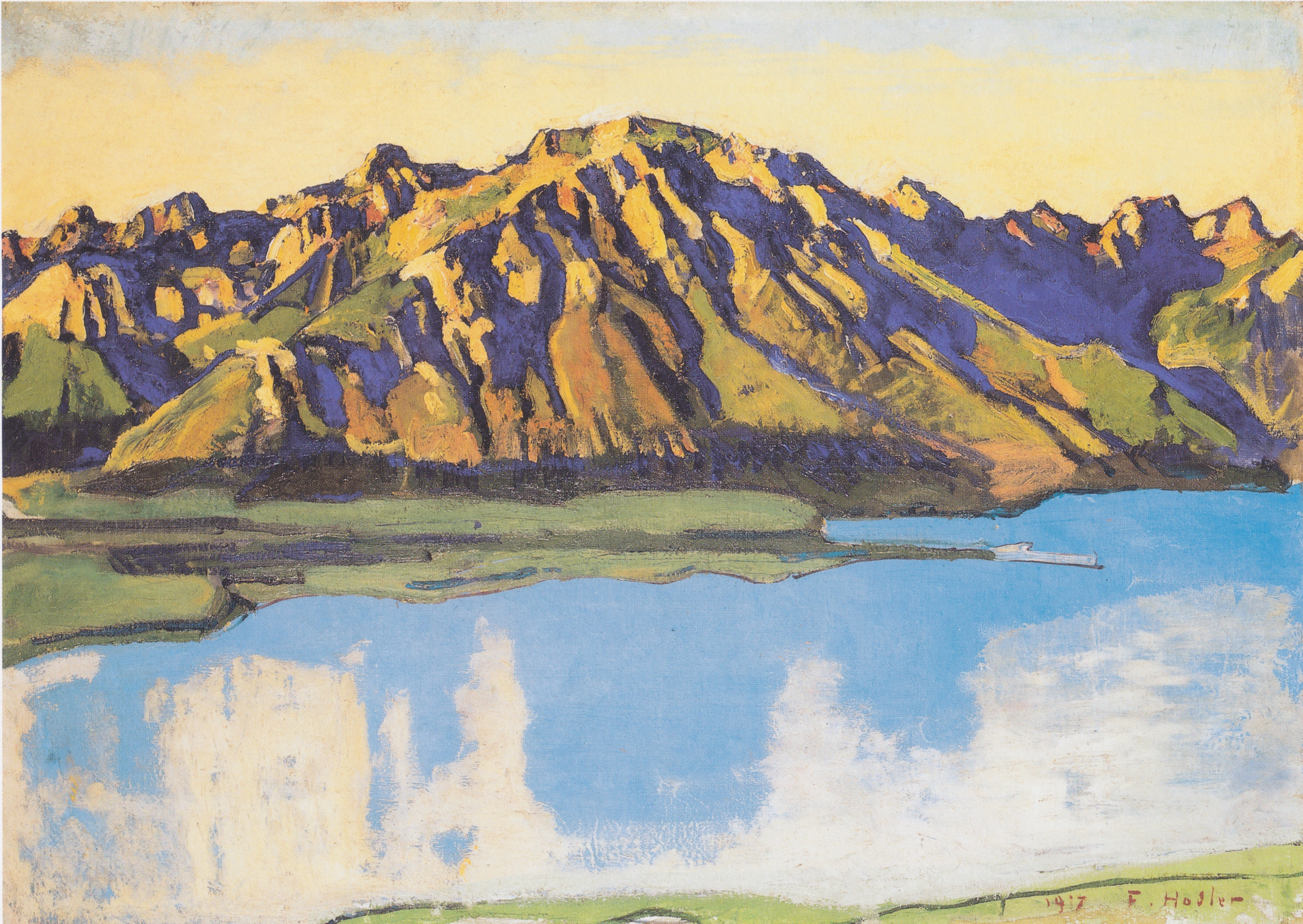
The Grammont in the morning sun, by Ferdinand Hodler.

The Tauredunum event of AD 563 is thought to have occurred on the slopes of Le Grammont, named for a Roman-era fortress situated close to the point where the Rhône flows into Lake Geneva.

During the Second World War, there is a recorded incident of a Lancaster of the Royal Air Force getting shot down by the Swiss anti-aircraft gunners and crashing into the mountain. The pilot of the aircraft was Horace Badge and all of the crew were lost.

== See also ==
- List of mountains of Switzerland
- Swiss Alps
