= Swiss Heritage Society =

Swiss non-profit organization

The Swiss Heritage Society (German: Schweizer Heimatschutz, SHS) is a non-profit organisation dedicated to the advancement of Switzerland's architectural heritage. Its focus is on the preservation of important landmarks, the development of the structural environment, and the promotion of good architectural design.

The Swiss Heritage Society was founded in 1905, has about 17,000 members and publishes the magazine Heimatschutz/Sauvegarde quarterly.

The Swiss Heritage Society pursues its goals mainly with public relations activities, through publications, technical consulting in construction projects, advisory functions in planning committees, appraisals, legal action, and financial grants for pioneering projects. The SHS commends exemplary achievements by awarding prizes (Wakker Prize, Heimatschutz Prize, Schulthess Horticultural Prize). Together with Pro Natura, the SHS has been supporting the annual fundraising drive with chocolate talers (Schoggitaler) for over fifty years.

== Heimatschutz movement ==
Heimatschutz is a cultural and ideological movement, originating in the late 19th century, devoted to the preservation of landscape, traditional architecture, customs, and local traditions. The term was coined by the German musician Ernst Rudorff (1840–1916) in the 1880s. Reacting to the acceleration of industrialization and urbanization during the second half of the 19th century, supporters of Heimatschutz deplored the disfigurement of town and countryside, the loss of traditional values, and the growing sense of uprooting felt by the population, in line with the contemporary Lebensreform movement.

=== Origins and ideology ===
In Switzerland, the booming tourism industry, with its hotels and mountain railways, became a favored target of criticism. At the end of the 19th century, engaged figures from the literary and artistic worlds had already protested in press articles against excessive advertising, the demolition of historic buildings, and the modernization of old towns. These early criticisms gave rise to Heimatschutz in Switzerland. Ideologically, the current rested on the idealization of rural life and traditional agriculture, associated with values such as simplicity, purity, and authenticity. The movement denounced dominant utilitarianism and the banalization of the landscape. The notion of Heimatschutz quickly extended well beyond the protection of historic monuments to touch nearly all manifestations of popular culture, notably handicrafts, costume, local architecture, folk song, and dialects. Nature and especially the Alps, with their identity-forming function, occupied a far more central place in Switzerland than in other countries.

=== Campaigns ===
Activists were drawn from the relatively narrow stratum of the cultivated and humanist bourgeoisie, but they regularly appealed to the wider population during concrete conflicts, for example by launching national petitions. The struggle against the construction of the rack railway up the Matterhorn, against several hydroelectric plants, and for the conservation of the Rhine Falls and Lake Sils attracted considerable attention, as did, later, opposition to the construction of highways through the Simmental and the Valais, and the rejection of the planned Rothenthurm military training ground. In the architectural domain, Heimatschutz did not limit itself to the conservation of existing buildings; by launching competitions—for instance, in 1908, "for simple Swiss dwellings"—it also sought to promote new architectural forms that placed the useful and the aesthetic on equal footing.

=== Legal and institutional framework ===
On the legislative level, a constitutional article on the protection of nature and heritage was adopted in Switzerland for the first time in 1962 after years of effort (article 78 of the Swiss Federal Constitution of 1999). Three federal inventories pursue analogous aims: the Inventory of Swiss Heritage Sites (ISOS, since 1973), the Federal Inventory of Landscapes, Sites and Natural Monuments of National Importance (IFP, since 1977), and the Inventory of Historical Routes of Switzerland (IVS, 1984–2003).

== See also ==
- Federal Inventory of Landscapes and Natural Monuments
- The Vacations in a Listed Building Foundation

== Bibliography ==
- F. Walter, Les Suisses et l'environnement, 1990.
- D. Le Dinh, Le Heimatschutz, une ligue pour la beauté, 1992.
- Ch. Schläppi, "Anwalt des Lautlos-Selbstverständlichen", in Der kleine Bund, 28.6.1997.
- R. de Miller, "Quelle histoire pleine de vitalité!", in Heimatschutz, 1998, no 1, 12–18.
- M. Bundi, ed., Préserver et créer: 100 ans de Patrimoine suisse, 2005.
- 40 Prix Wakker, 1972–2011, 2011.
- S. Bundi, Graubünden und der Heimatschutz, 2012.
