= Aarewaage =

Coordinates: 47.32000°N 7.89850°E

Video of the Aarewaage

The Aarewaage (in local Swiss German dialect: Woog) is a whirlpool phenomenon in the Swiss river Aare at Aarburg, in the canton of Aargau. In 1996, it was added to the Federal Inventory of Landscapes and Natural Monuments.

== Formation ==
At the location of the Aarewaage, the river widens into a broader natural basin and at the same time meets a rock on which Aarburg Castle is located. The large whirlpool, the "Waage", is created by the main current of the Aare passing by calmer water in the basin, increasing its water level in cycles, a process further intensified by part of the current being diverted by the castle rock and the influx of the two streams Tych and Dorfbach.

== History ==
For several centuries, the Aarewaage played a central role in the development of Aarburg. From the 12th century onward, the town became an important trading centre. The whirlpool and a natural harbour on the Aare made the site useful for river transport and trade. A wide range of goods were traded there, contributing to the town’s economic prosperity.

The importance of the Aarewaage declined in the mid-19th century with the arrival of the railway, which rapidly replaced river transport. In the 20th century, the site was twice threatened by planned construction projects. In the 1950s, there were plans to build a power station, and in the 1970s further infrastructure projects were proposed. Both initiatives were ultimately abandoned following opposition from the local population.

In December 2013, part of the side wall at the Aarewaage collapsed over a length of around 15 metres. The wall, which is itself a protected monument, was restored between April and May 2014.
