= Isus =

Isus may refer to:

- Isus (mythology), a son of Priam, killed by Agamemnon, in Greek mythology
- Isus (Boeotia), a town of ancient Boeotia
- Isus (Megaris), a town of ancient Megaris

== See also ==
- Issus (disambiguation)
- Jesus, Jesus Christ
