= The Vacations in a Listed Building Foundation =

Swiss nonprofit organization

- Formation: 2005
- Founder: Swiss Heritage Society (SHS)
- Type: Foundation, nonprofit organization
- Purpose: Building conservation and preservation
- Headquarters: Villa Patumbah, Zürich, Switzerland
- Website: www.magnificasa.ch

The Vacations in a Listed Building Foundation (French: Fondation Vacances au coeur du patrimoine, German: Stiftung Ferien im Baudenkmal) is a nonprofit organization established in 2005 by the Swiss Heritage Society (SHS). The Foundation buys abandoned landmark buildings, restores them and rents them out as holiday homes.

== History ==
The Vacationing in a Listed Building Foundation was inspired by both the National Trust and more specifically the Landmark Trust in England.

In 2016, the Anako Lodge in La Forclaz and the Domaine des Tourelles in La Chaux-de-Fonds were restored through the foundation's programme and up for rent. The Château de Réchy was put up for rent in November 2017 after its restoration, and the Maison des fées in Charmey in 2020.

By the end of 2019, the foundation was managing 32 landmark properties.

== Description ==
The foundation is legally independent from the Swiss Heritage Society and acts thus operational since 2008. The five-to-seven members Board of Trustees is composed of representatives of relevant areas (homeland security, tourism, fundraising, architecture, etc.).

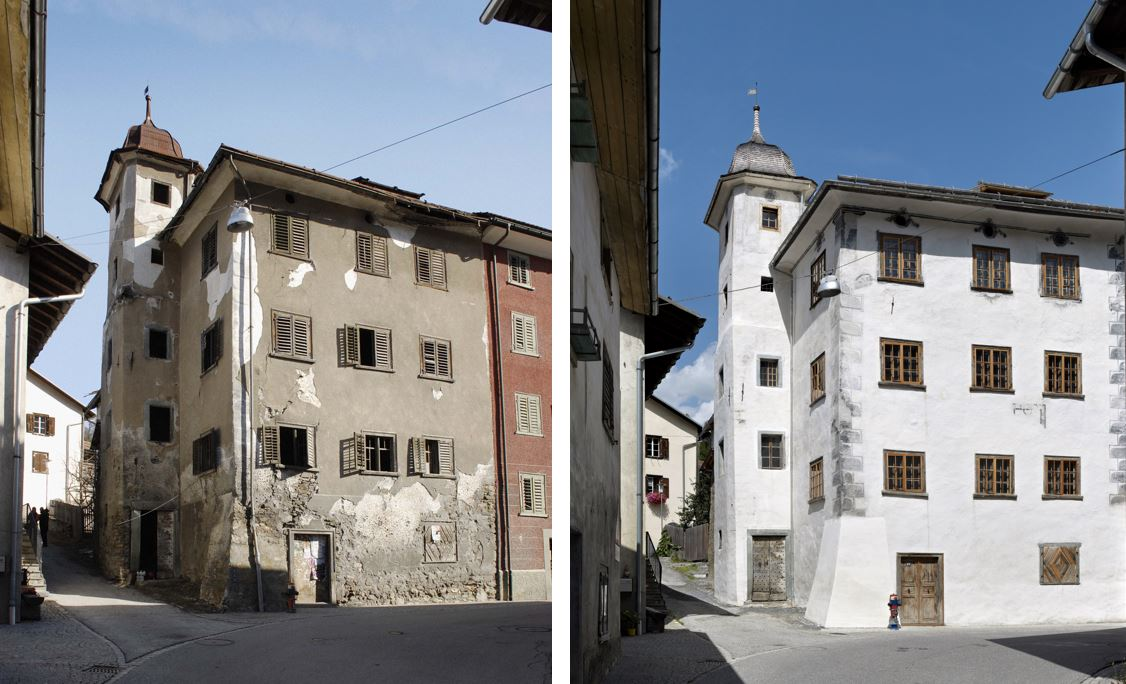
Türalihus in Valendas (GR): Fassade in 2007 und 2012.

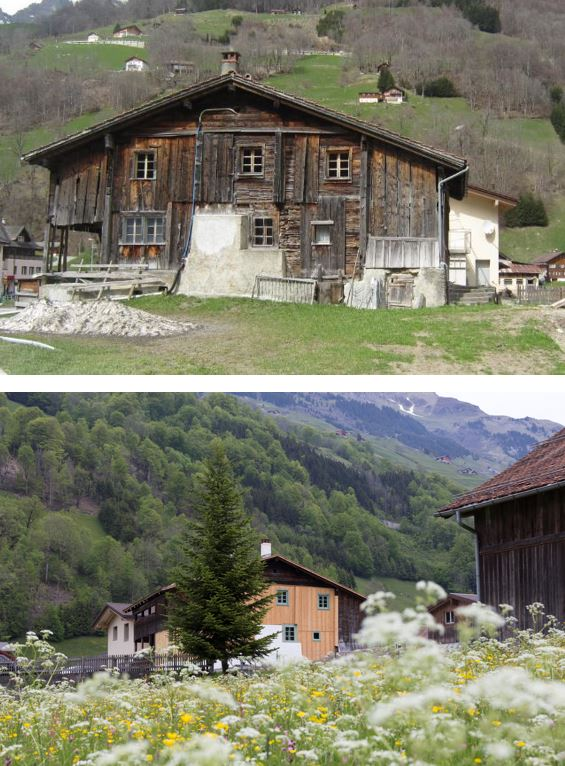
Stüssihofstatt in Unterschächen (UR).
