= Swiss traditional costumes =

Regional festive dress in Switzerland

Swiss traditional costumes (German: Schweizer Trachten; French: costumes suisses) are festive garments of the rural population of Switzerland, specific to each region and deliberately removed from the variations of fashion. They appeared in the 18th century as an expression of regional and social identity. During the 19th century they gave way to urban fashions, but at the end of that century they became a patriotic symbol. Alongside them, costumes linked to profession, social class, or nationality have also continued to develop into the present day.

== History ==
=== 19th-century emblems ===
In 19th-century prints, costumes underwent a formal simplification, reduced to emblems in which each canton was represented by a couple. This phenomenon was linked both to the political transformations between 1798 and 1815 and to the use of such images as travel souvenirs. From the first half of the 19th century, twenty-two costumed couples appeared in carnival processions, festivals, and commemorations. The "inhabitants" of the Swiss Village at the National Exhibition in Geneva (1896) wore costume. The same year, the Hottingen reading circle organized the first costume festival in Zurich. Interest now turned to historical originals, regarded as "patriotic antiquities". As a co-founder of the costume collection at the Swiss National Museum—into which the models made from old examples for the museum's inaugural procession in 1898 entered—Julie Heierli established recognition of these garments as historical witnesses.

=== Revival and federation ===
In 1906 the Schweizer Heimatschutz was constituted, and its cantonal sections gradually took an interest in costumes and their renewal, particularly in the canton of Bern in the run-up to the National Exhibition of 1914. During the First World War, patriotic women's movements in Vaud and Neuchâtel set themselves the goal of maintaining traditional costumes. The 1920s saw the appearance of new models, based on a more or less free interpretation of historical materials. This revival movement presented itself to the public through a large procession at the costume festival held within the federal agricultural exhibition of 1925 in Bern. It led, in 1926, to the founding of the Schweizerische Trachtenvereinigung (STV, French: Fédération nationale des costumes suisses, FNCS), independent from the Heimatschutz. Its primary aim was to introduce among the rural population a sober, timeless women's costume that erased social differences. The link with the Swiss Farmers' Association was ensured through the head of that movement, Ernst Laur. With the help of the Union of Swiss Peasant Women (Landfrauenverbands), the STV reached the rural home-economics schools. The founding of the Heimatwerk further supported the development of costumes by promoting the sale of Swiss textiles.

=== Later 20th century ===
The STV had its moment of glory in 1939 at the national costume festival held within the National Exhibition in Zurich. Its membership grew continuously until the end of the 1950s before declining (25,400 members in 2000), as the generational transition proved difficult. The regionalist movement of the 1970s had a positive effect on the federation: local and regional particularities were sought out, while great importance was placed on the historical legitimation of costumes. By also proposing other activities—singing, dance, and travel—and by supporting traditional crafts, costumed groups took an important place in the world of leisure, which translated into stronger male participation.

== Rules and contemporary use ==
The making and wearing of costumes are subject to varied cantonal regulations, the general principles being that a costume is not rented, that one wears only that of one's place of residence or origin, and that on formal occasions it is not combined with other garments. The number of people wearing costume without being affiliated with the federation varies by region. Official recognition of costumes is also reflected in the use made of them, for aesthetic or patriotic reasons, by tourism, advertising, and the media; however, the federation's low level of professionalization prevents a more active exploitation of this image. While the Center for Popular Culture (Zentrum für Volkskultur) in Burgdorf did not endure, the STV, headquartered in Bubikon, is still present at the Ballenberg open-air museum of rural housing.

== Historical photographs of Swiss costumes by canton ==
=== Aargau ===
Young woman at a spinning wheel in Aargau costume from the Oberaargau, Hans Brun, 1905

Full-length view of a woman from the Freiamt in bridal costume, 1905

Aargau couple in costume from the Wehntal, 1905

=== Appenzell Innerrhoden ===
Appenzell Innerrhoden, woman and man in Appenzell costume, 1910

Appenzell Innerrhoden, man in Appenzell costume, 1910

Appenzell Innerrhoden, men and a boy in Appenzell costume, 1910

Appenzell Innerrhoden, man in Appenzell costume, 1910

Appenzell Innerrhoden, woman in Appenzell costume, 1905

Appenzell Innerrhoden, young woman in Appenzell costume, 1906

Half-length view of an Appenzell woman in Innerrhoden costume, 1912

Appenzell woman in Innerrhoden Sunday costume, 1907

=== Basel-Landschaft ===
An older woman in Basel-Landschaft costume weaving, 1905

Young woman in Basel-Landschaft costume standing at a table, 1905

=== Fribourg ===
Two women in Fribourg costume, 1905

Woman in Fribourg costume seated on a chair

=== Glarus ===
Glarus, woman in Glarus costume, full view, 1905

Woman in Glarus costume standing under a flowering elder tree, 1905

=== Graubünden ===
Calanca Valley, woman in Graubünden costume, partial view, 1905

Calanca Valley, woman in Graubünden costume, 1905

=== Nidwalden ===
Nidwalden, woman in Nidwalden costume, partial view, 1905

Front view of a Nidwalden man in 18th-century costume, 1905

Nidwalden couple in costume, 1905

Rear view of a Nidwalden woman in costume, 1905

Nidwalden, woman in Nidwalden costume, full view, 1905

Nidwalden, Nidwalden hairstyle, 1905

=== Schaffhausen ===
Young woman from Schaffhausen in Hallau bridal costume reading a book, 1905

Profile view of a young woman in Schaffhausen costume, 1905

Hallau bride in costume, 1905

=== Thurgau ===
Thurgau, woman in Thurgau costume, 1905

A Thurgau woman in costume seated at a table, reading a book, 1905

=== Valais ===
Valais, woman in Valais costume, 1905

Valais woman in costume from the Val d'Hérens, 1905

Profile view of a young Valais woman in costume from the Lötschental, 1905

=== Zurich ===
Knonaueramt, woman in Zurich costume, 1905

Young woman in the Burefeufi costume from the Knonaueramt, 1905

Seated young woman in the Burefeufi costume from the Knonaueramt, 1905

Rafzerfeld, woman in Zurich costume, 1905

Rafzerfeld, woman in Zurich costume, 1905

=== Geneva, Neuchâtel, St. Gallen, Solothurn, Ticino, Vaud ===
Woman in Geneva costume holding a basket of vegetables

Neuchâtel, woman in Neuchâtel costume, partial view, 1905

Fürstenland, woman in St. Gallen costume, 1905

Solothurn, patrician couple in Solothurn costume, 1905

Young woman in Ticino costume from the Verzasca Valley, 1905

Vaud wine growers in costume, 1905

== List of cantonal costume associations ==
The websites of the cantonal costume associations provide a detailed overview of the various Swiss costumes.

Cantonal costume associations
Canton	Costume association	Founded	Members	Number of costume groups	Website
Zürich	Zürcher Trachtenvereinigung	1928			trachten-zuerich.ch
Bern	Bernische Trachtenvereinigung	1929		128	trachtenvereinigung-bern.ch
Lucerne	Luzerner Trachtenvereinigung	1927	1,750	51	trachtenvereinigung-luzern.ch
Uri	Trachtenvereinigung Uri	1942		7	trachten-uri.ch
Schwyz	Kantonal Schwyzerische Trachtenvereinigung			14	trachten-sz.ch
Obwalden	Obwaldner Trachten- und Volkslieder-Vereinigung			7	trachten-ow.ch
Nidwalden	Kantonale Trachtenvereinigung Nidwalden	1940	227	4	trachtenvereinigung-nidwalden.ch
Glarus	Trachtenvereinigung des Kantons Glarus				
Zug	Zuger Kantonaler Trachtenverband	1941			zugertrachten.ch
Fribourg	Freiburgische Vereinigung für Tracht und Brauch				ffcc.ch
Solothurn	Solothurner Trachtenverband			20	so-trachtenverband.ch
Basel-Stadt	Trachtenverband des Kantons Basel-Stadt	1936	36	2	trachtenvereinigung-bs.ch
Basel-Landschaft	Trachtenvereinigung Baselland	1939	400	12	trachtenvereinigung-bl.ch
Schaffhausen	Schaffhauser Kantonale Trachtenvereinigung				trachten-schaffhausen.ch
Appenzell Ausserrhoden	Trachtenvereinigung Appenzell Ausserrhoden	1926		6	trachtenvereinigung-ar.ch
Appenzell Innerrhoden	Trachtenvereinigung Appenzell Innerrhoden	1936	240	1	trachtenverein-ai.ch
St. Gallen	St. Gallische Trachtenvereinigung	1927	900	35	stgallischetrachtenvereinigung.ch
Graubünden	Bündner Trachtenvereinigung	1933		26	buendnertracht.ch
Aargau	Aargauischer Trachtenverband	1927		54	trachtenverband-aargau.ch
Thurgau	Thurgauer Trachtenvereinigung	1926		18	thurgauer-trachtenvereinigung.ch
Ticino	Federazione Cantonale del Costume Ticinese	1937		17	costumiticinesi.ch
Vaud	Association Cantonale du Costume Vaudois	1916		18	costume-vaudois.ch
Valais	Walliser Trachtenvereinigung			41	costumes-valais.ch
Neuchâtel	Société du costume neuchâtelois				
Geneva	Fédération Cantonale du Costume Genevois	1930		15	fccge.ch
Jura	Association des costumes et coutumes de la République et Canton du Jura				

(Sources: websites of the cantonal costume associations, as of September 2015.)

== Bibliography ==
- J. Heierli, Die Volkstrachten der Schweiz, 5 vols., 1922–1932.
- Heimatleben, 24, 1951.
- L. Witzig, Les costumes suisses, 1954 (German ed. 1954).
- L. Schürch, L. Witzig, Trachten der Schweiz, 1978 (repr. 1984).
- C. Burckhardt-Seebass, "Trachten als Embleme", in Zeitschrift für Volkskunde, 77, 1981, 209–226.
- S. Bolla, O. Lurati, L'immagine della tradizione, 1990.
- Th. Antonietti, Mode, Macht und Tracht, 2003.
