= Lac de Taney =

Lake in Valais, Switzerland

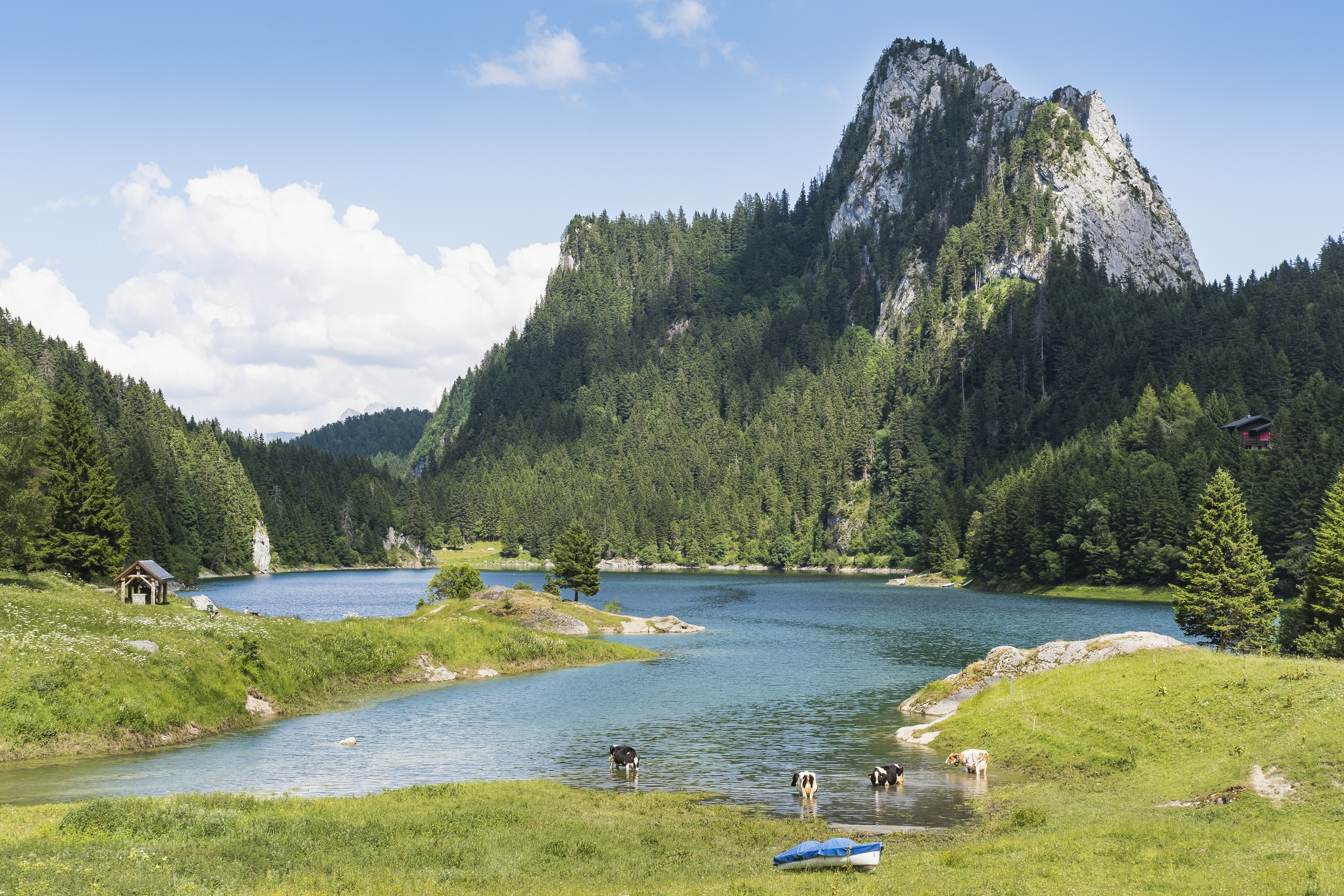

- Location within Canton of Valais Location within Switzerland Location within Alps
- Interactive map of Lac de Taney
- Location: Valais
- Coordinates: 46°20′45″N 6°50′26″E
- Basin countries: Switzerland
- Surface area: 17 ha (42 acres)
- Surface elevation: 1,411 m (4,629 ft)

Lac de Taney (or Lac de Tanay) is a lake in Valais, Switzerland. Its surface area is 17 ha (42 acres).

== Geography ==
The lake can be reached from Vouvry via the locality of Miex and then crossing the Col de Tanay.

To the northwest, the lake is dominated by Le Grammont and Les Jumelles.

The lake is part of the Rhone drainage basin.

The surrounding area is part of the Swiss Federal Inventory of Landscapes and Natural Monuments

Lac de Taney video

== See also ==
- Le Grammont
- List of mountain lakes of Switzerland
- Media related to Lac de Taney at Wikimedia Commons
