= Iso (American football) =

Type of play in American football

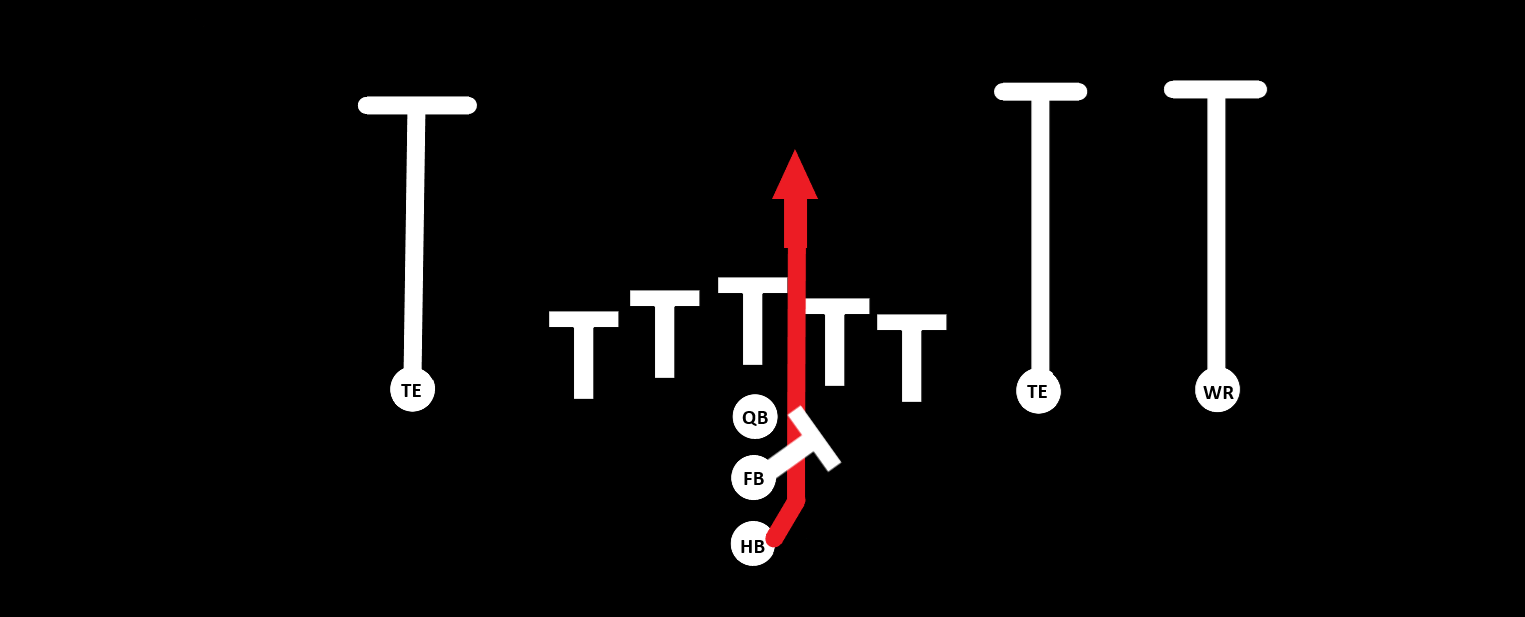
A normal Iso run play, in which all players except the runner (halfback [HB]) block so the runner can get the most yards.

An iso, short for isolation and also known as a halfback lead, is a simple run play in American football which is designed to isolate the fullback on a lead block with a linebacker, giving the halfback an easy five yards. Meanwhile, the other linebackers are blocked with zone blocks from the offensive line. It is one of the most commonly run concepts in football, and is useful in most situations.

== Requirements ==
The play requires a fullback to be successful, and is therefore almost always run out of I-formations. It helps if the defense is spread across the field, as that makes the combo blocks from the offensive line easier to execute.

=== Quarterback iso ===
The quarterback iso is a recently developed variant of the iso that is run out of shotgun and pistol formations. Often seen at the youth and high school levels of football, it takes advantage of mobile quarterbacks and uses the halfback as the lead blocker rather than a fullback. It is successful against defenses that put a limited number of players in the box.
