= Uebeschisee =

Lake in canton of Bern, Switzerland

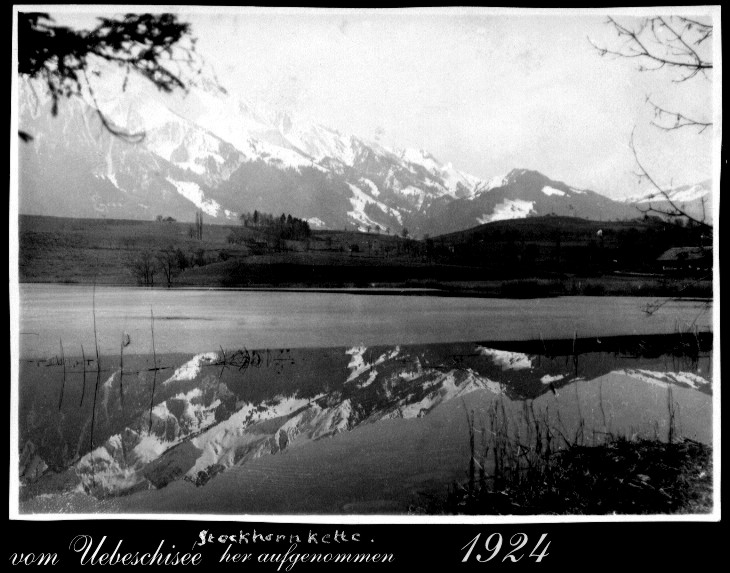
- Stockhornkette as seen from the lake

- Location within Canton of Bern Location within Switzerland Location within Alps
- Interactive map of Uebeschisee
- Location: Canton of Bern
- Coordinates: 46.73403°N 7.56486°E
- Primary outflows: Rotmoos-Bach
- Basin countries: Switzerland
- Max. length: 375 m (1,230 ft)
- Max. width: 350 m (1,150 ft)
- Surface area: 0.1421 km^{2} (0.0549 sq mi)
- Max. depth: 15 m (49 ft)
- Surface elevation: 641 m (2,103 ft)
- Settlements: Uebeschi

Uebeschisee is a small lake at Uebeschi, in the Upper Gürbetal, near Thun, Switzerland. It is located adjacent to the municipalities of Höfen, Amsoldingen and Uebeschi. The lake has a surface area of 14.2 hectares (35 acres) and a maximum depth of 15 m. Rotmoos-Bach drains it into the larger Amsoldingersee.
