= Piz Arina =

Mountain in Switzerland

- Location within Switzerland

Highest point
- Elevation: 2,828 m (9,278 ft)
- Prominence: 188 m (617 ft)
- Parent peak: Muttler
- Coordinates: 46°52′03″N 10°22′14″E

Geography
- Location: Graubünden, Switzerland
- Parent range: Samnaun Alps

Piz Arina (2,828 m) is a mountain of the Samnaun Alps, located north of Ramosch in the canton of Graubünden. It lies east of the Val Sinestra, on the range descending from the Muttler.
