= Issus =

Issus may refer to:

- Issus (Cilicia), an ancient settlement in the modern Turkish province of Hatay
  - Battle of Issus (333 BC), in which Alexander the Great of Macedonia defeated Darius III of Persia
  - Battle of Issus (194), in which P. Cornelius Anullinus defeated Septimius Severus's rival Pescennius Niger
  - Battle of Issus (622), in which the Byzantine emperor Heraclitus defeated Shahrbaraz of Persia
  - Issus (diocese), a Roman Catholic titular see in the town
- Issus (river), a river near the town and battle site
- Gulf of Issus, near the town
- Issus, Haute-Garonne, a commune in France
- Issus (planthopper), a genus of planthoppers in the family Issidae
- Issus, the ostensible Goddess of Death and Eternal Life in the Barsoom series of novels

== See also ==
- Isus (disambiguation)
