= Les Jumelles =

Mountain in Switzerland

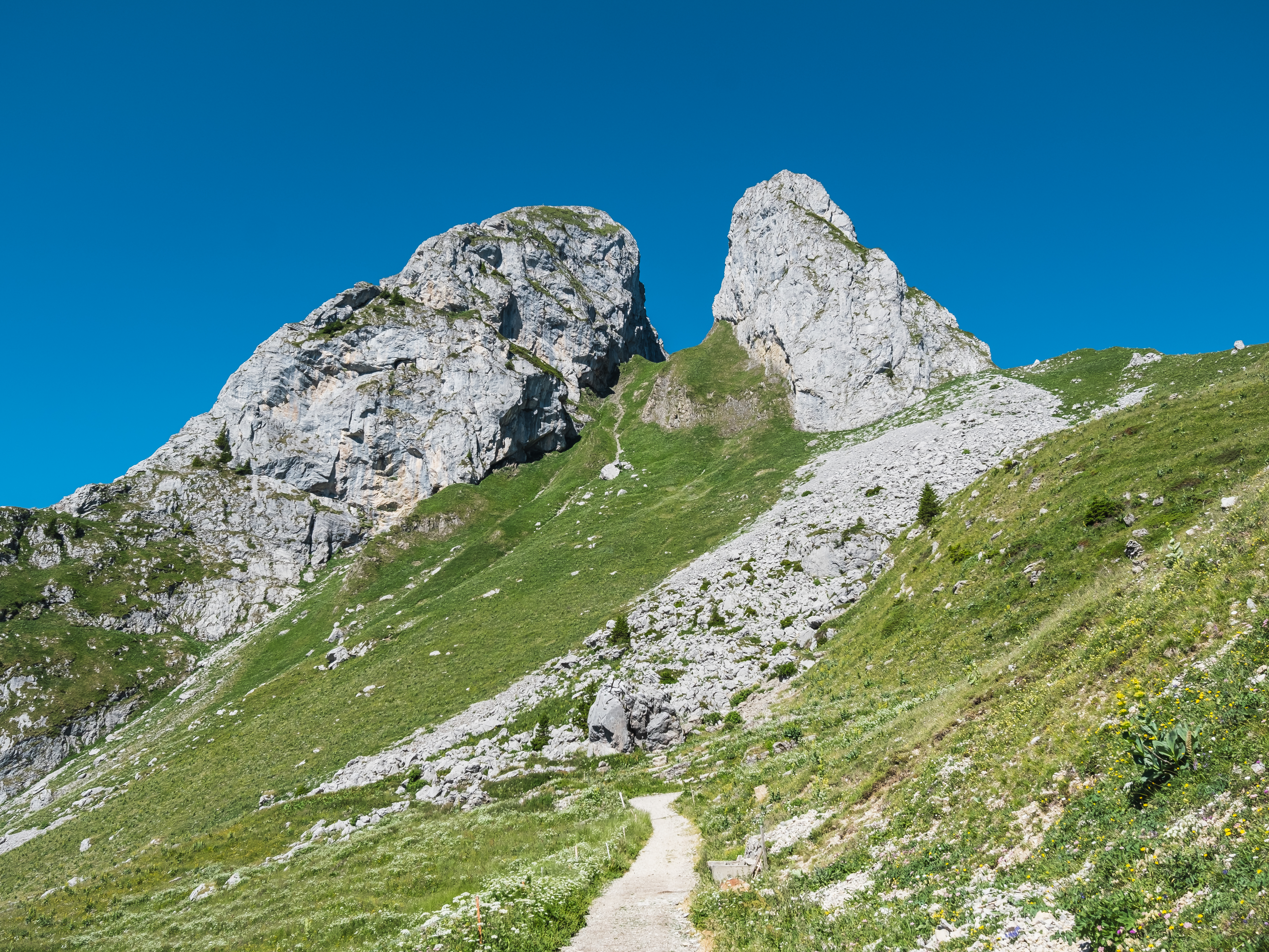
- Les Jumelles from Les Combes.

Highest point
- Elevation: 2,215 m (7,267 ft)
- Prominence: 365 m (1,198 ft)
- Parent peak: Cornettes de Bise
- Coordinates: 46°21′8.1″N 6°48′49.3″E

Geography
- Location within Switzerland
- Main peaks in Chablais Alps Mouse over (or touch) gives more detail of peaks. Location in Switzerland
- Location: Switzerland
- Parent range: Chablais Alps

Les Jumelles (French pronunciation: [le ʒymɛl]) is a mountain in the Chablais Alps, overlooking Taney in Valais. It has two distinct summits, the highest (Grande Jumelle) being 2,215 m (7,267 ft) high and the lowest (Petite Jumelle) being 2,182 m (7,159 ft) high.
