= Val da Camp =

Valley in Graubünden, Switzerland

Coordinates: 46°23′23″N 10°06′24″E

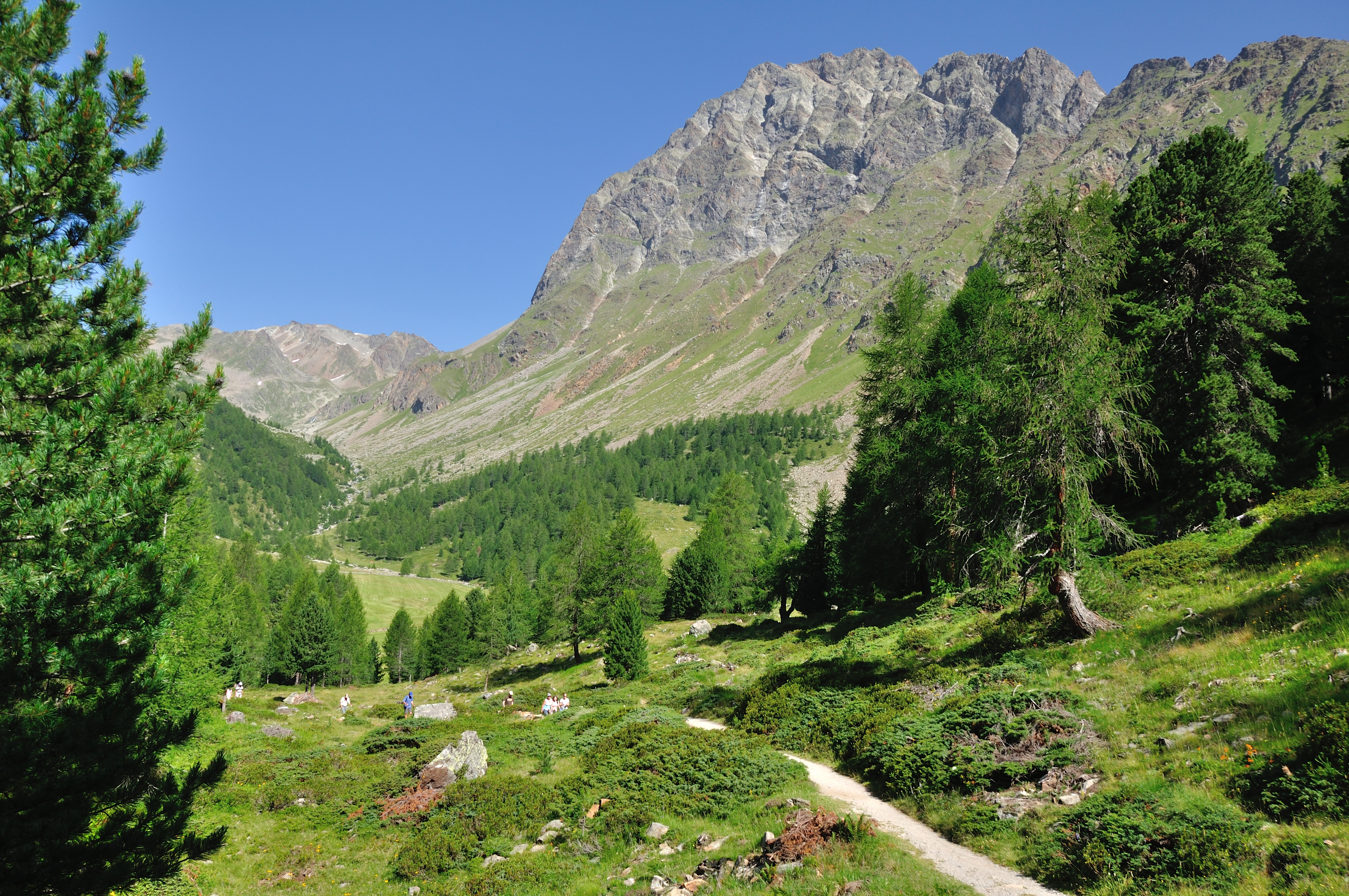
Hiking trail in Val di Campo

Val da Camp is a valley in Bernina District, Grisons, Switzerland.
