= Amsoldingersee =

Lake in Switzerland

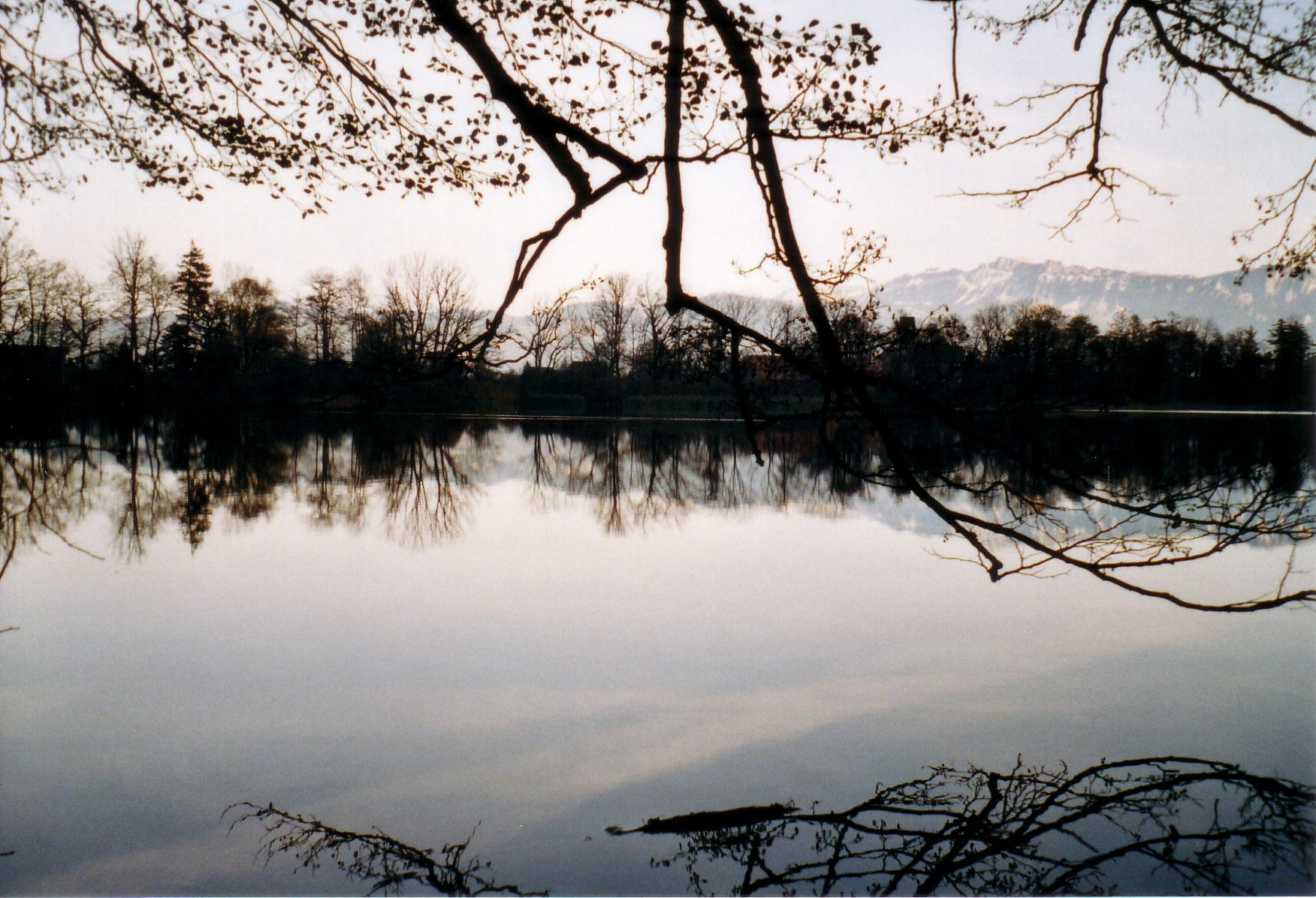

- Location within Canton of Bern Location within Switzerland Location within Alps
- Interactive map of Amsoldingersee
- Location: Canton of Bern
- Coordinates: 46°43′26″N 7°34′37″E
- Type: natural
- Primary inflows: Rotmoos-Bach
- Primary outflows: Wahlenbach
- Catchment area: 4.202 km^{2} (1.622 sq mi)
- Basin countries: Switzerland
- Max. length: 1.1 km (0.68 mi)
- Max. width: 0.5 km (0.31 mi)
- Surface area: 0.381525 km^{2} (0.147308 sq mi)
- Max. depth: 13.9 m (46 ft)
- Water volume: 2,552,682 m^{3} (90,147,100 cu ft)
- Surface elevation: 641 m (2,103 ft)
- Settlements: Amsoldingen

Amsoldingersee is small lake adjacent to the town of Amsoldingen, in the Upper Gürbetal. It is located near the city of Thun, Switzerland. The lake has a surface area of 38 hectares and a maximum length of 1.1 km and width of 500 m. The maximum depth is 14 m. It is fed by Rotmoos-Bach from the smaller Uebeschisee.

== See also ==
- List of lakes of Switzerland
