= Jacques-Barthélemy Micheli du Crest =

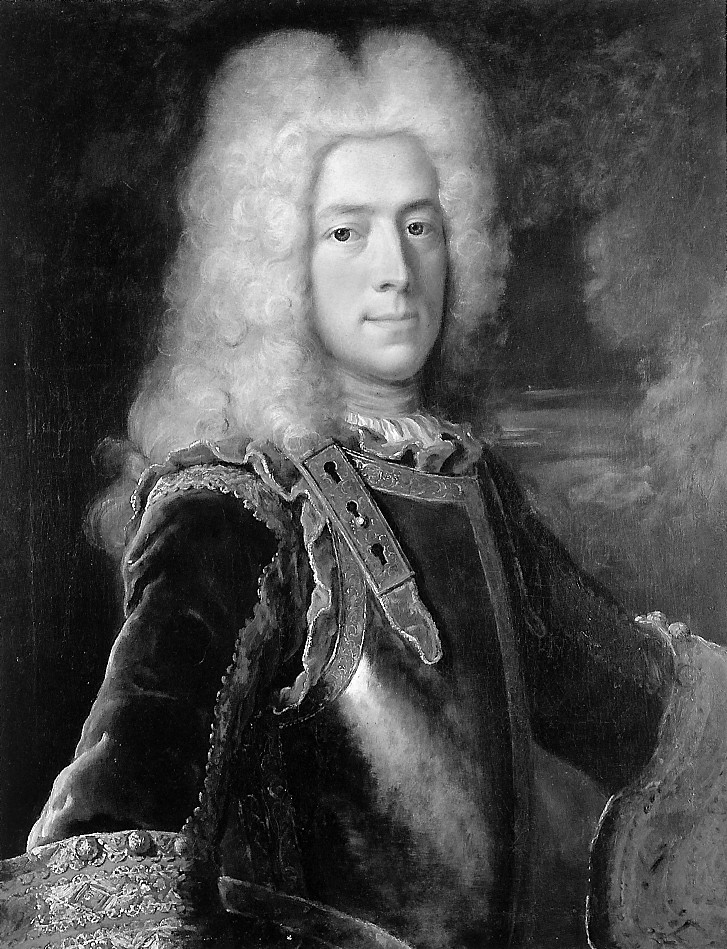
Portrait by Robert Gardelle, c. 1720

Jacques-Barthélemy Micheli du Crest (Geneva, 28 September 1690 – Zofingen, 29 March 1766) was a military engineer, physicist and cartographer from the Republic of Geneva, now in Switzerland. Born into the aristocracy, he eventually fled to France as an enemy of Geneva and spent his later years in Aarburg Castle as a political prisoner. During his time there, he mapped the Alps accurately using rudimentary tools. One of his other major accomplishments whilst in exile was to create a thermometer and a temperature scale, which was commonly used in Switzerland and around Europe until it became obsolete in the 19th century.

== Early life and career ==
Du Crest was born in Geneva to Jacques Micheli du Crest, a captain in the mercenary troops of France, and Elisabeth Calandrini. He graduated from the Collège de Genève in 1705. Du Crest entered French service in 1709 and fought in the War of the Spanish Succession, reaching the rank of captain in 1712. He became a military engineer by the age of 23. In 1721, after leaving the army, Du Crest took up his place as a member of Geneva's Council of Two Hundred, as was his family's right, specialising in security.

During his time in the parliament, Du Crest argued against the Genevan oligarchy and was an outspoken critic of the planned wall around Geneva. Eventually, due to his views and publishing pamphlets such as "Maxims of a Republican", he was declared an enemy of Geneva, his rights as a citizen were revoked, and his lands were confiscated. Du Crest fled to Paris in 1731. In 1735, he was sentenced to death in absentia and his effigy was symbolically beheaded in Geneva.

== Life in exile and as a political prisoner ==
Whilst in France, Du Crest spent much of his time dedicated to scientific study. He made advances in the study of temperature and came up with a recognised temperature scale which was used in Switzerland for many years. Du Crest was still outspoken regarding political issues, and lost the support of the people protecting him in France. He was forced to flee again across Europe in 1744, stopping in major cities such as Zurich and Bern, until he became ill and was hospitalised in Bern's Inselspital, where he was arrested in 1746. He was moved to Aarburg Castle, after getting involved with Samuel Henzi's conspiracy, where he was held as a political prisoner for the remainder of his life.

== Scientific achievements ==
Du Crest devoted a significant portion of his life in exile to scientific study, making pioneering developments in cartography and the measurement of temperature.

=== Temperature scale ===
Du Crest believed that the temperature of the Earth was fundamentally fixed, based on the supposition that cellars and mines maintained an equal temperature. He used this "temperature of the terrestrial globe" as one fixed point, measured in a cellar 84 feet (26 m) below Paris Observatory, and the temperature of boiling water as a second fixed point. His scale between these points was then divided into one hundred equal degrees.

=== Thermometer ===
Du Crest rejected mercury thermometers, stating that the substance was too difficult to purify, preferring instead alcohol which had passed the gunpowder test. He created a thermometer based the expansion of alcohol, calibrated using mercury. He further published works that explained his belief that alcohol expanded more regularly than mercury, and his experiments matched his scale more accurately than mercury did.

=== Mapping the Alps ===
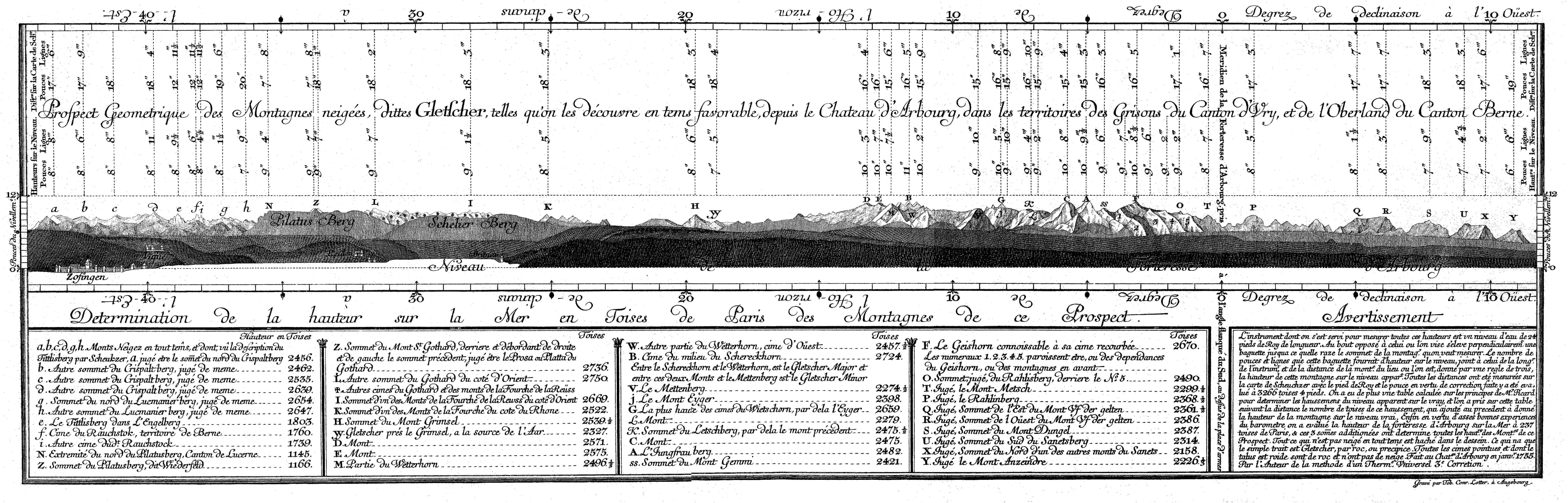
du Crest's panorama of the Alps

During his time at Aarburg Castle he published many meteorological papers and created a cartographical drawing of the Alps as viewed from the castle. Without any modern equipment, such as a theodolite or telescope he instead used an eight-meter long gutter pipe, filled with water to measure levels and a small rod held in front of it, he could measure the heights of the peaks. He then used the Scheuchzer map of 1712 to calculate the distances away, and drew the first scientific panorama of the Alps.
