= Aarburg =

- Municipality
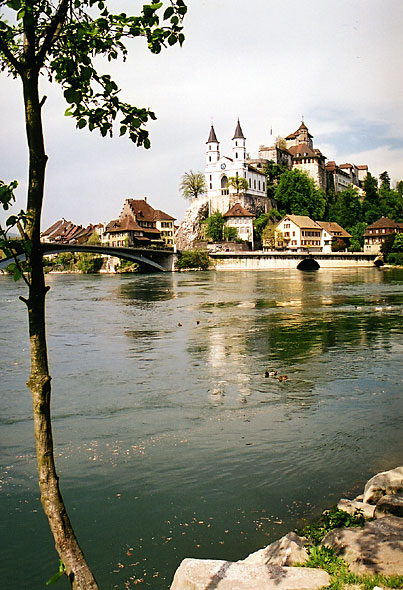
- Aarburg old town

- Flag Coat of arms
- Location of Aarburg
- Location within Switzerland Location within Canton of Aargau
- Coordinates: 47°19′N 7°54′E
- Country: Switzerland
- Canton: Aargau
- District: Zofingen

Government
  - Executive: Gemeinderat with 5 members
  - Mayor: Gemeindeammann; Hans-Ulrich Schär unrelated (as of 2014)
  - Parliament: none (Gemeindeversammlung)

Area
  - Total: 4.41 km^{2} (1.70 sq mi)
- Elevation (Städtchen): 397 m (1,302 ft)

Population (December 2020)
  - Total: 8,577
  - Density: 1,940/km^{2} (5,040/sq mi)
- Demonym: German: Aarburger(in)
- Time zone: UTC+01:00 (CET)
  - Summer (DST): UTC+02:00 (CEST)
- Postal code: 4663
- SFOS number: 4271
- ISO 3166 code: CH-AG
- Surrounded by: Oftringen, Olten (SO), Rothrist, Starrkirch-Wil (SO)
- Website: www.aarburg.ch

Aarburg (Swiss Standard German pronunciation: [ˈaːrbʊrɡ]) is a historic town and a municipality in the district of Zofingen in the canton of Aargau in Switzerland.

The town lies in the southwest Aargau, in a narrow section of the Aare valley, at the confluence with the Wigger. It lies in the intersection of the most important traffic routes of Switzerland. The dominant landmark is the Aarburg Castle, one of Switzerland's largest castles and a heritage site of national significance. The visual character of Aarburg is shaped by the fortification and the church on a rock spur.

== History ==
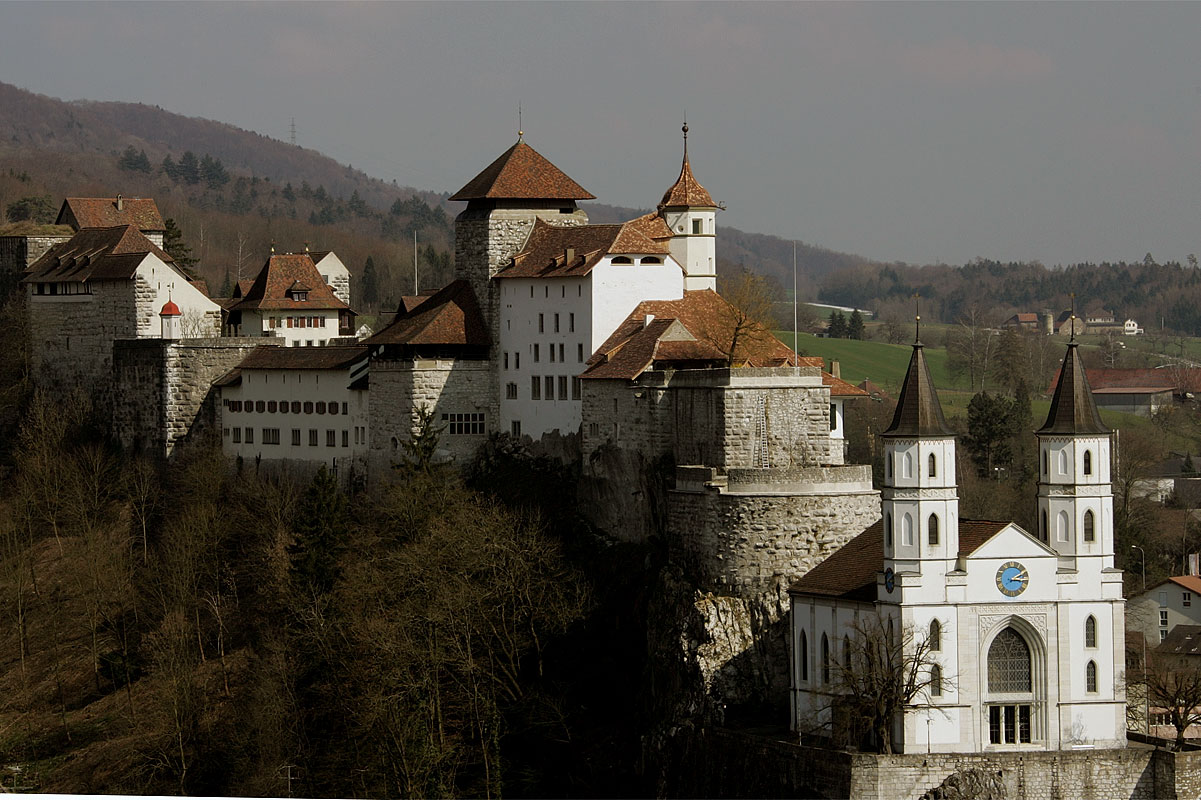
Aarburg Castle

In Roman times a road went by Aarburg, connecting the Olten region with the rest of inner Switzerland. During the construction of a factory in the 20th century, a hoard of coins produced during the reign of Emperor Tetricus I was discovered. The coin hoard was probably buried during the Bagauden Invasions in 284 CE.

When, precisely, the fortress of Aarburg was constructed on the rocky outcropping is unknown. The first time it was documented was in 1123 when it is mentioned as Areburc. At the time it was the property of the Grafen von Frohburg family. From this castle the Bailiwick of Aarburg was governed, what is today the western part of the county of Zofingen, though not the town of Zofingen itself. In 1299 the Frohburgs sold the castle and the Bailiwick of Aarburg to the Habsburg family. The settlement at the foot of the castle was clearly identified as a town in the year 1330. Archeological evidence has shown that the town was probably founded around the year 1312.

Wedged between the cities of Olten and Zofingen, with only four kilometers between them, Aarburg could not develop commercially and remained a small town. The people of Aarburg lived mainly on the tariff revenues that commerce along the Gotthard Pass provided. A small harbor on the river Aare was constructed in 1361. The resulting river boat traffic was of great economic importance until the 16th and 17th centuries.

After a short siege the town was captured by Bern on 14 April 1415. In 1416, the castle became the residence of the bailiff of the Bailiwick of Aarburg. Under control of Bern, the castle was expanded into a fortress in the 16th and 17th centuries, in order to protect the alliance between the Reformed cities of Bern and Zurich from attack by their Catholic neighbors.

On 4 May 1798 the town and fortress were captured by France without a struggle. The district of Aarburg was dissolved and the regional administrative functions of the French imposed Helvetic Republic were moved to Zofingen. The newly established Canton of Aargau took over the fortress in 1804, initially using it as a jail and prison. Since 1893 the castle has housed a canton-run school.

A huge fire destroyed much of the premises and the church on 4 May 1840, leaving 68 families homeless. The village was rebuilt, though without the main fortifications. On the rock spur, near the castle, a church was raised up between 1842 and 1845 in the new gothic style.

The first textile factory was opened in 1824. The railway station was opened in on 9 July 1856 along the Aarau – Olten – Zofingen – Emmenbrücke line; on 16 March 1857, the Herzogenbuchsee line was opened, later extended to Bern. Aarburg thereby became a privileged industrial town. In the second half of the 20th century the township's population doubled due to the construction of the autobahn nearby.

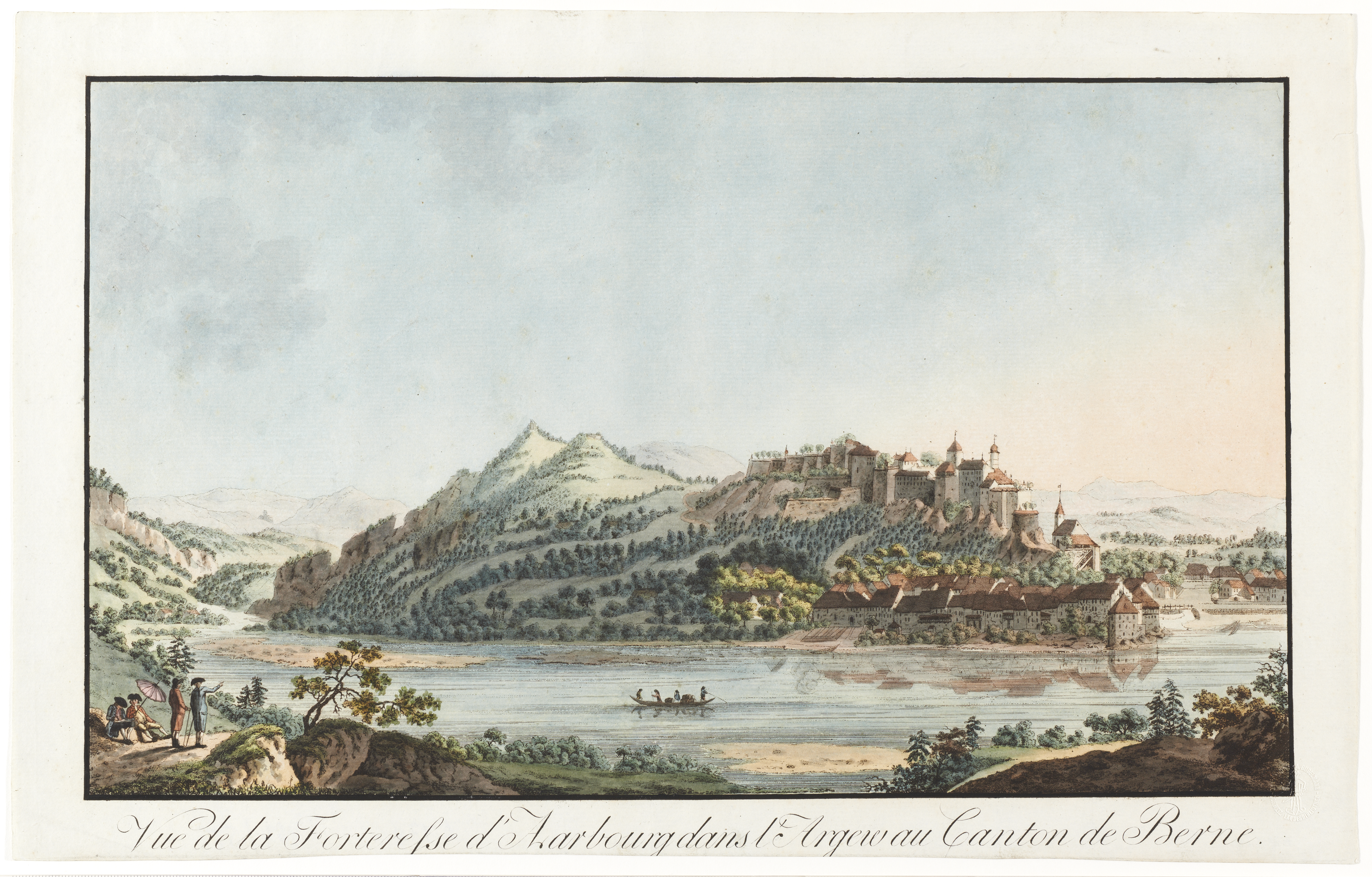
Etching (colored) of Aarburg, by Christian von Mechel, 1790

== Geography ==
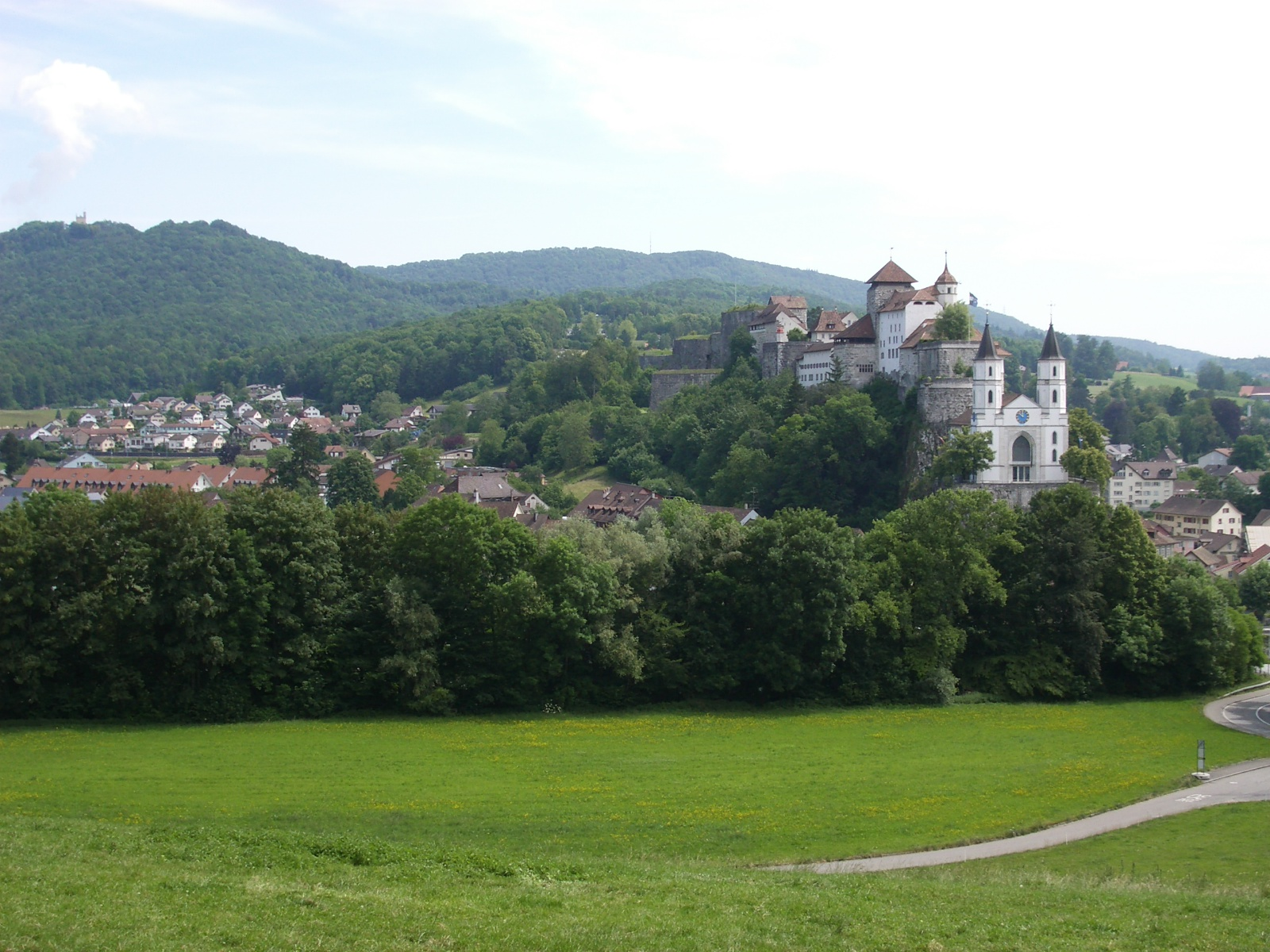
Aarburg village around the castle

Aarburg has an area, as of 2009, of 4.42 square kilometers (1.71 sq mi). Of this area, 0.85 km^{2} (0.33 sq mi) or 19.2% is used for agricultural purposes, while 1.37 km^{2} (0.53 sq mi) or 31.0% is forested. Of the rest of the land, 2.02 km^{2} (0.78 sq mi) or 45.7% is settled (buildings or roads), 0.17 km^{2} (0.066 sq mi) or 3.8% is either rivers or lakes and 0.01 km^{2} (2.5 acres) or 0.2% is unproductive land.

Of the built up area, industrial buildings made up 4.8% of the total area while housing and buildings made up 23.3% and transportation infrastructure made up 10.2%. Power and water infrastructure as well as other special developed areas made up 4.1% of the area while parks, green belts and sports fields made up 3.4%. Out of the forested land, 29.4% of the total land area is heavily forested and 1.6% is covered with orchards or small clusters of trees. Of the agricultural land, 12.2% is used for growing crops and 4.8% is pastures, while 2.3% is used for orchards or vine crops. All the water in the municipality is flowing water.

The municipality is located in the Zofingen District, along the Aare where it forms the Aarewaage whirlpool. It lies at the foot of Aarburg hill and Aarburg Castle. It consists of the village of Aarburg and industrial sections from the 19th and 20th centuries, along the river.

== Coat of arms ==
The blazon of the municipal coat of arms is Or a Castle Sable with portcullis closed the tower dexter ensigned with a cross of the first and on the top of the sinister tower an Eagle displayed of the second.

== Demographics ==
Aarburg has a population (as of December 2020) of 8,577. As of June 2009, 39.0% of the population are foreign nationals. Over the last 10 years (1997–2007) the population has changed at a rate of 3.8%. Most of the population (as of 2000) speaks German (77.9%), with Italian being second most common (6.0%) and Serbo-Croatian being third (3.7%).

The age distribution, as of 2008, in Aarburg is; 714 children or 10.7% of the population are between 0 and 9 years old and 798 teenagers or 11.9% are between 10 and 19. Of the adult population, 956 people or 14.3% of the population are between 20 and 29 years old. 924 people or 13.8% are between 30 and 39, 1,146 people or 17.1% are between 40 and 49, and 863 people or 12.9% are between 50 and 59. The senior population distribution is 578 people or 8.6% of the population are between 60 and 69 years old, 420 people or 6.3% are between 70 and 79, there are 253 people or 3.8% who are between 80 and 89, and there are 41 people or 0.6% who are 90 and older.

As of 2000 the average number of residents per living room was 0.61 which is about equal to the cantonal average of 0.57 per room. In this case, a room is defined as space of a housing unit of at least 4 m^{2} (43 sq ft) as normal bedrooms, dining rooms, living rooms, kitchens and habitable cellars and attics. About 38.9% of the total households were owner occupied, or in other words did not pay rent (though they may have a mortgage or a rent-to-own agreement).

As of 2000, there were 287 homes with 1 or 2 persons in the household, 1,578 homes with 3 or 4 persons in the household, and 677 homes with 5 or more persons in the household. As of 2000, there were 2,577 private households (homes and apartments) in the municipality, and an average of 2.4 persons per household. In 2008 there were 909 single family homes (or 29.9% of the total) out of a total of 3,037 homes and apartments. There were a total of 142 empty apartments for a 4.7% vacancy rate. As of 2007, the construction rate of new housing units was 0 new units per 1000 residents.

In the 2007 federal election the most popular party was the SVP which received 32.64% of the vote. The next three most popular parties were the SP (21.78%), the FDP (13.4%) and the CVP (10.63%). In the federal election, a total of 1,364 votes were cast, and the voter turnout was 40.0%.

The historical population is given in the following table:

Historical population
Year	Pop.	±%
1764	569	—
1798	1,029	+80.8%
1850	1,700	+65.2%
1900	2,300	+35.3%
1970	5,943	+158.4%
2000	6,263	+5.4%

== Heritage sites of national significance ==
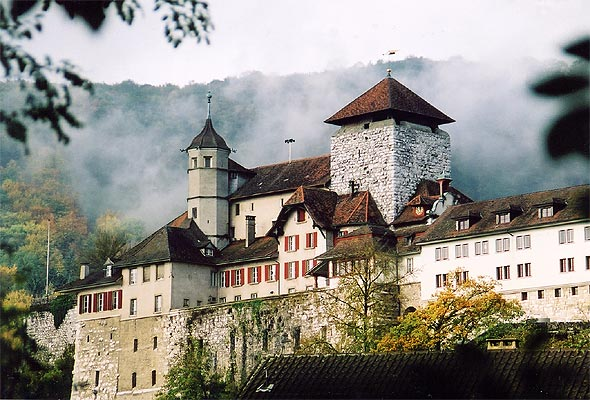
Aarburg castle

The Galgen or ruins of the Froburg built gallows, the Gasthof (combination hotel and restaurant) alte Post (former noble's house) at Städtchen 5 and the Castle are listed as Swiss heritage sites of national significance. The entire village of Aarburg is designated as part of the Inventory of Swiss Heritage Sites.

=== Sights ===
The old town is located in a triangular area between the river and the wedge-shaped rock formation, which forms a natural barrier on two sides. The houses are grouped around a similarly wedge-shaped square. The town fortification on the north side was never rebuilt after the fire of 1840. Dominating the old town is a narrow, extended rock spur, on which one finds the Aarburg fortress. It was constructed at the beginning of the 12th century and expanded into a mighty fortress when it was controlled by Bern. The fortress complex is a nationally recognized cultural asset and serves as a youth center today. The fortress offers public tours at 2:00 PM on Saturdays during the spring and summer months (around April–October). A tour fee is charged (2010:10.CHF) for persons 16 and over. Private tours may be arranged by reservation all year through the youth center (Jugendheim Aarburg). The Aarburg Historic Museum is open the 2nd and 4th Sunday mornings of the month.

On a terrace between the fortress and the old town one finds the reformed church. It was constructed from 1842 to 1845 in the new gothic style with two spires located on the west side. Beneath the church on the rock spur is the parsonage, constructed in 1726; until the town fire of 1840 the town gate went through its basement.

== Economy ==
As of 2007, Aarburg had an unemployment rate of 3.8%. As of 2005, there were 15 people employed in the primary economic sector and about 5 businesses involved in this sector. 928 people are employed in the secondary sector and there are 50 businesses in this sector. 1,767 people are employed in the tertiary sector, with 217 businesses in this sector. In 2000 there were 3,233 workers who lived in the municipality. Of these, 2,402 or about 74.3% of the residents worked outside Aarburg while 1,856 people commuted into the municipality for work. There were a total of 2,687 jobs (of at least 6 hours per week) in the municipality. Of the working population, 17.4% used public transportation to get to work, and 49.1% used a private car.

== Religion ==
From the 2000 census, 2,140 or 34.2% were Roman Catholic, while 2,287 or 36.5% belonged to the Swiss Reformed Church. Of the rest of the population, there were 24 Old Catholics (or about 0.38% of the population) belonging to the Christian Catholic Church of Switzerland.

== Education ==
In Aarburg about 59.4% of the population (between age 25-64) have completed either non-mandatory upper secondary education or additional higher education (either university or a Fachhochschule). Of the school age population (in the 2008/2009 school year), there are 490 students attending primary school, there are 170 students attending secondary school, there are 109 students attending tertiary or university level schooling, and there are 9 students who are seeking a job after school in the municipality. Aarburg is home to the Stadtbibliothek Aarburg library. The library has (as of 2008) 8,271 books or other media, and loaned out 20,379 items in the same year. It was open a total of 230 days with average of 11 hours per week during that year.

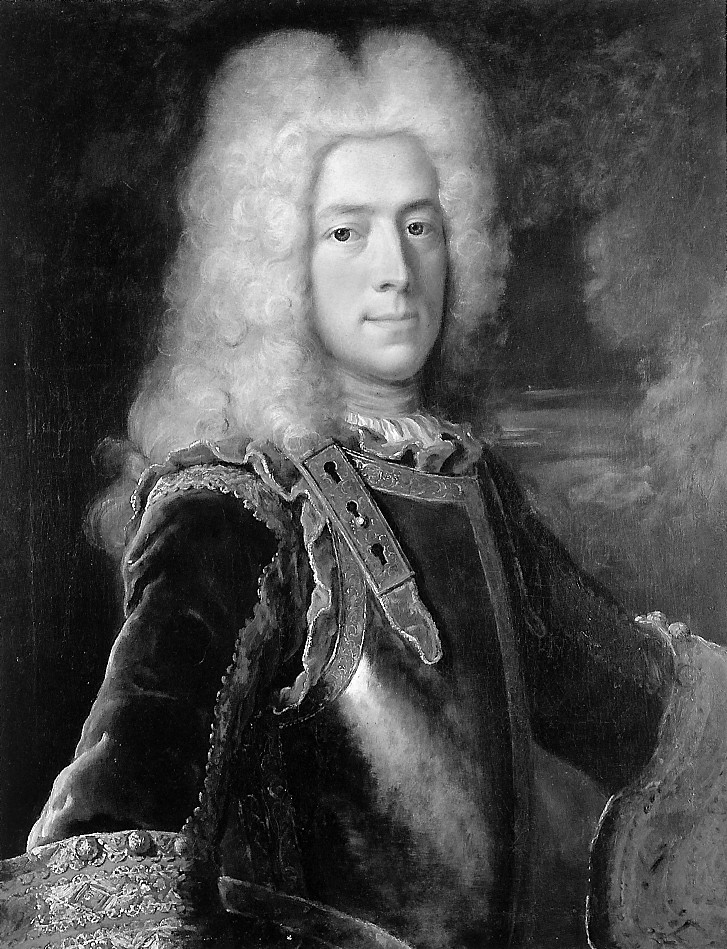
Jacques-Barthélemy Micheli du Crest, 1721

== Transportation ==
The municipality has a railway station, Aarburg-Oftringen, on the Olten–Bern on Olten–Lucerne lines. It has regular service to Lucerne, Langenthal, and Baden.

== Notable people ==
- Jacques-Barthélemy Micheli du Crest (1690 – 1766) a military engineer, physicist and cartographer, spent his later years in Aarburg Castle as a political prisoner
