= Aarburg Castle =

Castle in Aargau, Switzerland

- Festung Aarburg
- Aarburg
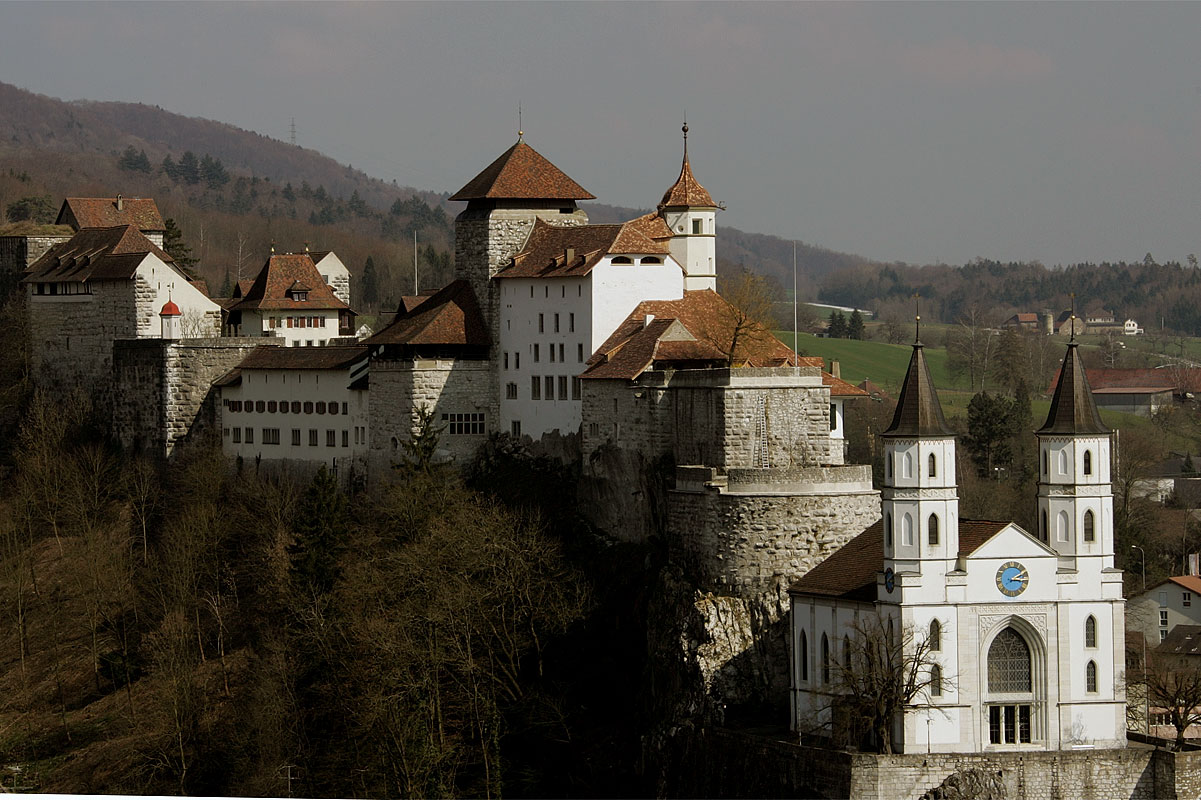
- Aarburg Castle and church

Site information
- Code: CH-AG
- Condition: In use as Cantonal Youth Home

Location
- Coordinates: 47°19′17.91″N 7°54′3.36″E
- Height: 405 m above the sea

Site history
- Built: 12th century, 1659–1673

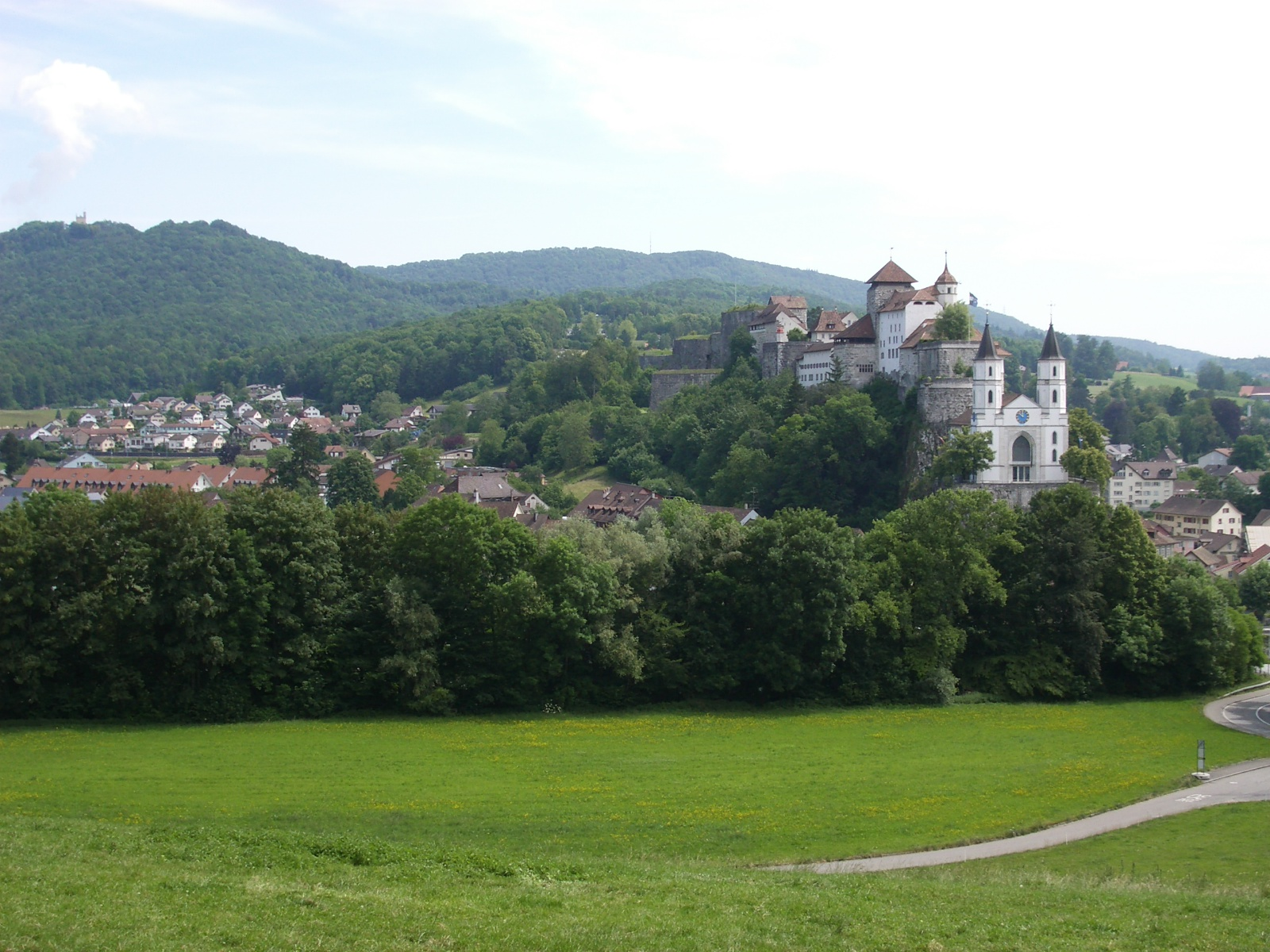
Aarburg Castle and the town of Aarburg

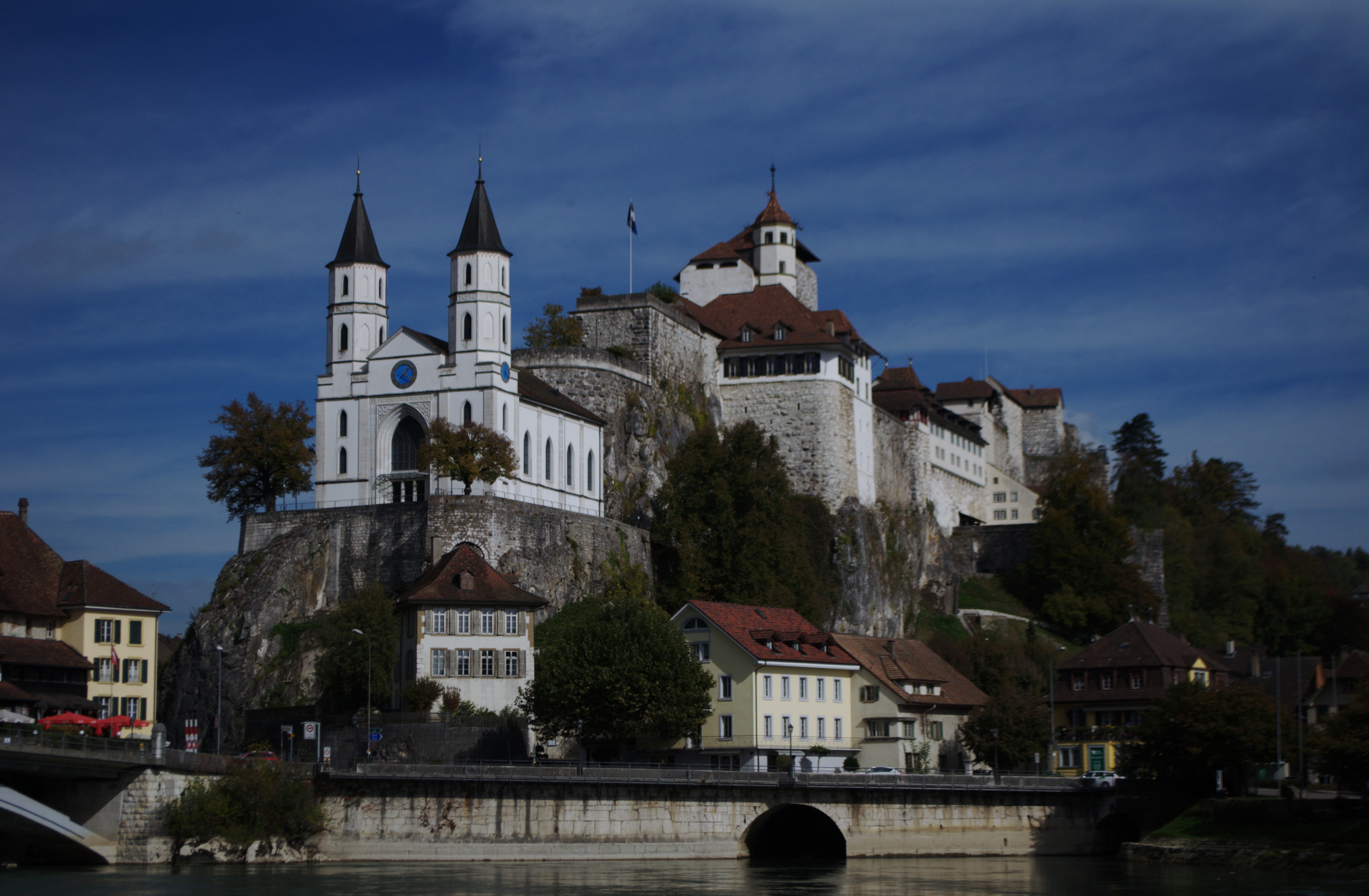
Aarburg Castle above the Aare river

Aarburg Castle (German: Festung Aarburg) is a castle in the municipality of Aarburg in the canton of Aargau in Switzerland. It is located high above the town Aarburg on a steep, rocky hillside. The castle was built around a medieval castle, which controlled the narrow point on the Aare river and served as the seat of Aarburg Vogt. It is classified as a Swiss heritage site of national significance. Today it houses the Kantonale Jugendheim, for holding and rehabilitating juvenile offenders.

== History ==
The exact year of construction of the castle is not known. However, it was probably built around 1200 by the Lords of Büron. The building was mentioned at the beginning of the 13th century, in the possession of the Counts of Frohburg. The Vogtei (a bailiff or vogt was an overlord exerting guardianship or military protection as well as secular justice (Blutgericht) over a certain territory, the Vogtei) was created to better control and monitor the important north–south trade route over the Aare River. Together with the Vogt's seat, the high court was also held at the castle. The administration area included the western part of today's District Zofingen, but without the city of Zofingen. In 1299 the Frohburgs sold the castle and the entire Vogtei to the Habsburgs. After about 1330 the Family von Kriech, a lower nobility family in the service of the Habsburgs, lived in the castle.

On 20 April 1415, the castle fell after a brief siege by the town of Bern. The Bernese took over the lower and the high court. Starting in 1416 a Bernese bailiff resided in the castle. The bailiff managed the entire Bernese Aargau. Only later, once Bern had suppressed the rights of the nobility and the clergy, additional bailiwicks were added: Lenzburg (1442), Schenkenberg (1460), Biberstein (1499) Zofingen (1528), Königsfelden (1528) and Kasteln (1732).

The castle was extended in several stages, the first was the rebuilding of the palace in 1470. Subsequent modifications in the 16th century (1534/35) and especially in the 17th century (1621, 1659–1673) led to the creation of the huge baroque structure. Its purpose was to protect the connection between the Protestant towns of Bern and Zurich at the narrowest point of the Bernese dominion and thus complicate any attacks from Catholic neighbors. From 1666, the fortress was occupied continuously by a garrison, the governor was now at the same commander. One part of the fortress served as a prison, especially for political prisoners. The best known prisoner is Jacques-Barthélemy Micheli du Crest. On 10 March 1798, the castle fell without a fight to the French Army.

In 1804, the newly created Canton of Aargau took over the castle. Initially it served as an arsenal and barracks, then from 1826 to 1864 as a prison before it was left abandoned. The Cantonal Parliament decided in 1891 to establish an "institution for juvenile criminals and scoundrels" in the castle. Opened in 1893, compulsory education institution was the first of its kind in Switzerland. In 1917 the building was extended. Initially the system focused mainly on discipline, order and punishment. Then, in the 1930s, the governing philosophy shifted more toward education and reform. From 1946 to 1959 the center was completely remodeled and a second total renovation happened from 1982 to 1988. In 1972, the name was changed from "Reform Institution" to "Education Home", then in 1989 it became the "Youth Home" to reflect the changing objectives.

== Buildings ==
On the narrow, elongated ridge, the core of the castle was built. This core consisted of a keep and a tower house from the 13th century. The keep's walls are 3 to 3.5 metres (9.8 to 11.5 ft) thick, and consist entirely of limestone. The bottom floor has been carved directly from the rock. The tent-like roof was built in 1557. In 1621/22 the castle grew toward the south, with an additional living area and stair tower. On the northeast and west side are the large, heavily fortified buildings. The cell block on the south side was replaced in 1954/55 by a house for the educational staff, but it was built in harmony with the historic buildings.

== See also ==
- List of castles and fortresses in Switzerland
