= ISO character set =

ISO character set may primarily refer to:

- ISO/IEC 646, list of 7-bit character sets since 1967
- ISO/IEC 8859, list of 8-bit character sets since 1987
- ISO/IEC 10646, a 32-bit character set since 1990

It may also refer to:

- ISO basic Latin alphabet
- ISO/IEC 2022
- ISO 2033
- ISO 2047
- ISO 5426
- ISO 5427
- ISO 5428
- ISO 6438
