= Isus (Megaris) =

Isus or Isos (Ancient Greek: Ἴσος) was a town in ancient Megaris.
