= Rapido Group =

Camping Van and Motorhome Company

Coordinates: 48.309389°N 0.643250°W

- Company type: Private Company
- Industry: Motorhome Company
- Founded: 1961; 65 years ago in Châtillon-sur-Colmont France
- Founder: Constant Rousseau
- Headquarters: Mayenne, France
- Area served: International
- Key people: Pierre Rousseau; Nicolas Rousseau
- Products: Motorhomes and Camping Van Conversion
- Subsidiaries: Rapido RVs; Rapidhome; Campérêve; Dreamer; Fleurette; Florium; Giottiline; Itineo; Westfalia; Roadtrek; Stylevan; Wild’Ax
- Website: corporate-rapido.com/en/

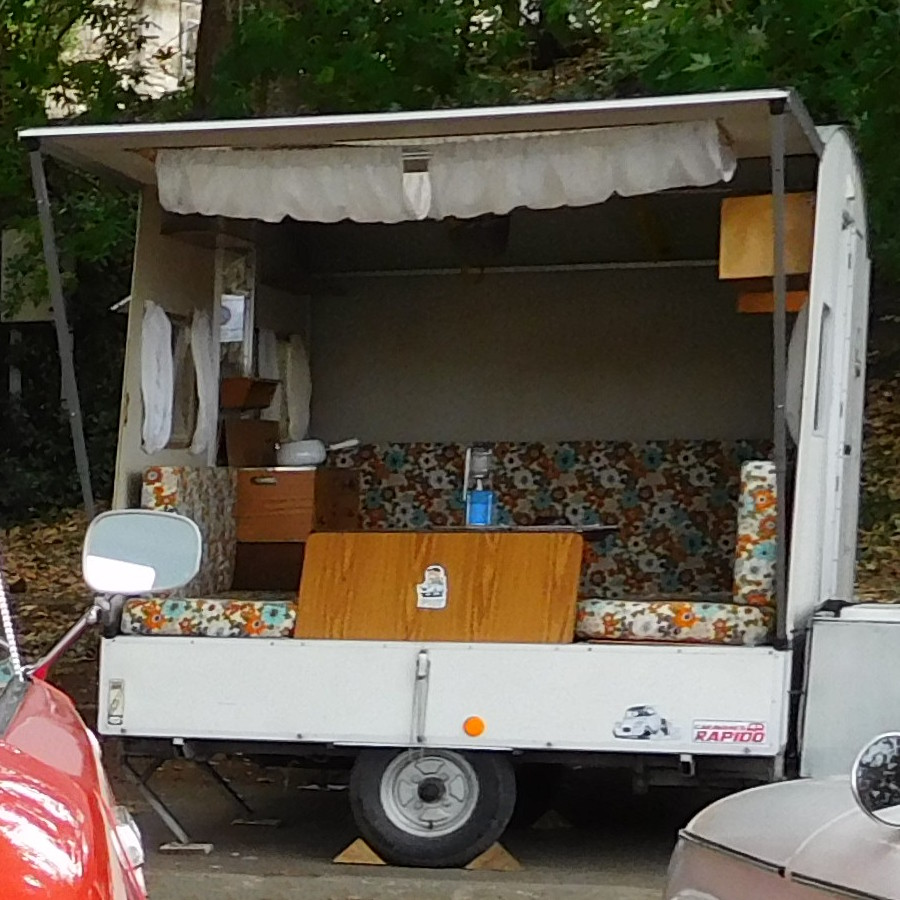
Rapido camper, Petite caravane Rapido

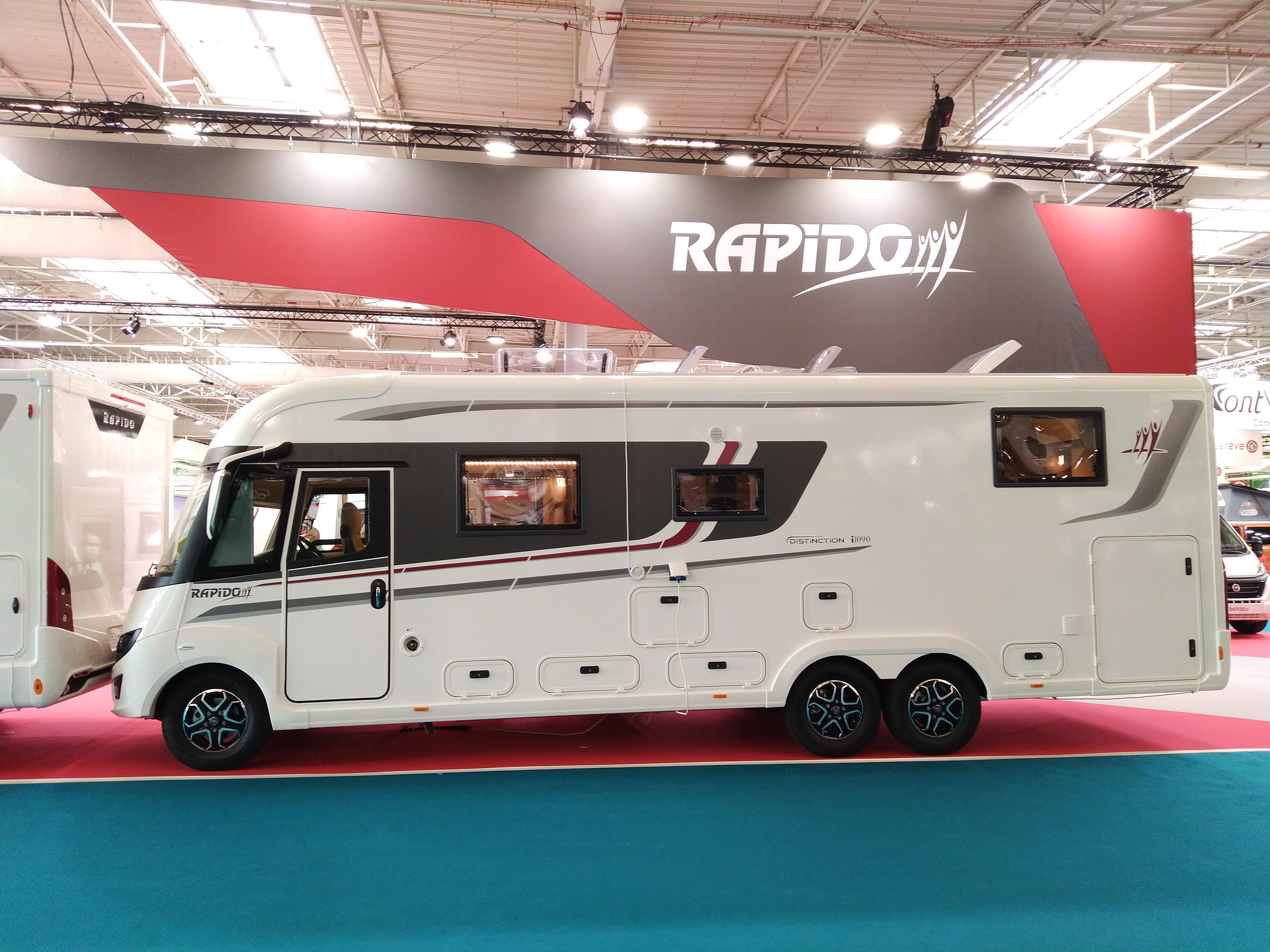
Rapido camper Class A motorhome at vehicle show in 2021

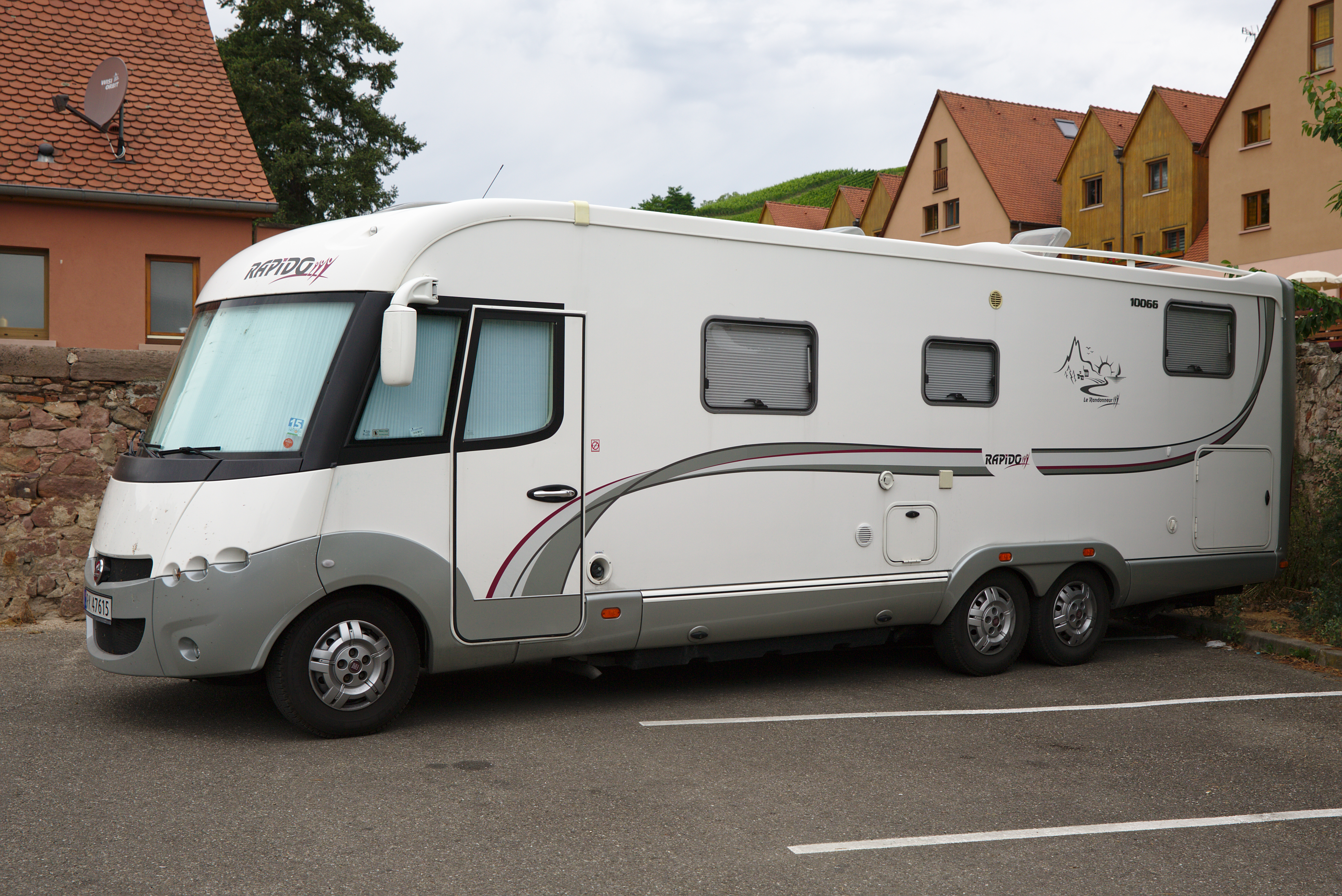
Rapido 6-wheel motorhome in 2015

The Rapido Group is a French manufacturer of motorhomes in Mayenne, France. Rapido Group owns Rapido RVs and other moterhome/van brands: Campérêve, Dreamer, Fleurette, Florium, Giottiline, Itineo, Rapidhome, Westfalia, Roadtrek, Stylevan and Wild’Ax.

== History ==
Rapido Group was founded in 1948 by cabinetmaker Constant Rousseau. Rousseau started a cabinetmaker/carpentry company in Châtillon-sur-Colmont in France. Rousseau moved into camping when he a made folding caravan trailer for his family in 1958 . His cabinetmaker/carpentry company moved into camping trailers in the 1961, winning the first prize in the Lépine competition. His folding caravan trailer he called Rapido, after the Rapido River in Italy, that is visited in 1961. In 1975 the folding caravan trailer factory moved to Mayenne, France. Rousseau son, Pierre Rousseau join the leadership of the company. In the early 1980, Rapido Group started making motorhomes. In 1983, the Rapido first motorhome was the Randonneur 410, a Class C motorhome on a Renault van. In the 1990s, Rapido Group started to build Class A motorhomes. In 2014, Nicolas Rousseau became leader of the company, the third generation of a family firm. Rapido Group has grown through the acquisition of other motorhome companies:

- 1961: Rapido RVs, Mayenne, France
- 1993: acquisition of Esterel, in Beaucouzé, France. Founded in 1959, no longer in production.
- 1998: creation of Rapidhome (mobile homes) in Mayenne, Nord and Lot-et-Garonne, France.
- 2005: acquisition of Fleurette, founded in 1967 by Jean Lucas. In Vendée, France.
- 2006: creation of Itineo in Mayenne, France
- 2010: acquisition of Westfalia, in Rheda-Wiedenbrück, in North Rhine-Westphalia, Germany
- 2008: acquisition of Campérêve, Founded 1978, is in Seine-et-Marne, France.
- 2014: creation of Dreamer, in Mayenne, France
- 2016: acquisition of Giottiline (P.L.A.) in Colle di Val d'Elsa, Italy, founded in 2004 by the Giotti family.
- 2017: acquisition of Stylevan in Auxerre and Benet Vendée, France, founded in 1980.
- 2017: acquisition of Wildax in Elland, England, founded in 1939.
- 2019: acquisition of Roadtrek, Kitchener, Ontario, Canada, founded in 1980.

== See also ==
- Bedford Dormobile
- Volkswagen California
