= Sliding door =

Door that opens horizontally by sliding

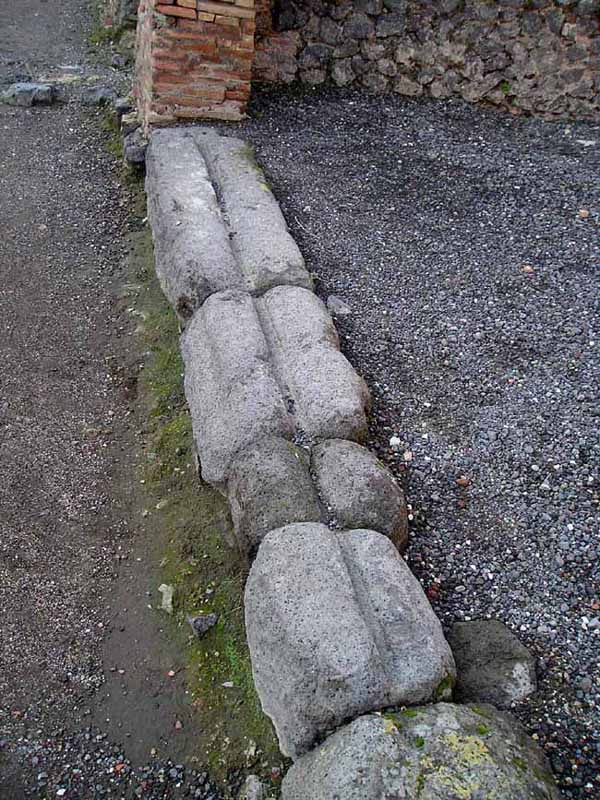
Roman sliding door tracks at Pompeii, Italy (1st century AD)

A sliding door is a type of door which opens horizontally by sliding, usually parallel to (and sometimes within) a wall. Sliding doors can be mounted either on top of a track below or be suspended from a track above. Some types slide into a space in the parallel wall in the direction of travel, rather than the door sliding along the outside of the parallel wall. There are several types of sliding doors, such as pocket doors, sliding glass doors, center-opening doors, and bypass doors. Sliding doors are commonly used as shower doors and screen doors (typically made of glass), as wardrobe doors, and in vans.

== History ==
Sliding doors were used as early as the 1st century CE in Roman houses (as evidenced by archaeological finds in Pompeii, Italy). However, there is no evidence to confirm that the Romans were the first humans to have invented or used sliding doors.

== Sliding door gear ==
The mechanism used to operate a sliding door is called sliding door gear. There are two standard types: top-hung or bottom rolling systems. Both types do not have a perfect seal. To reduce air- and smoke-tightness and improve sound insulation, brush seals are commonly used.

=== Top-hung sliding doors ===
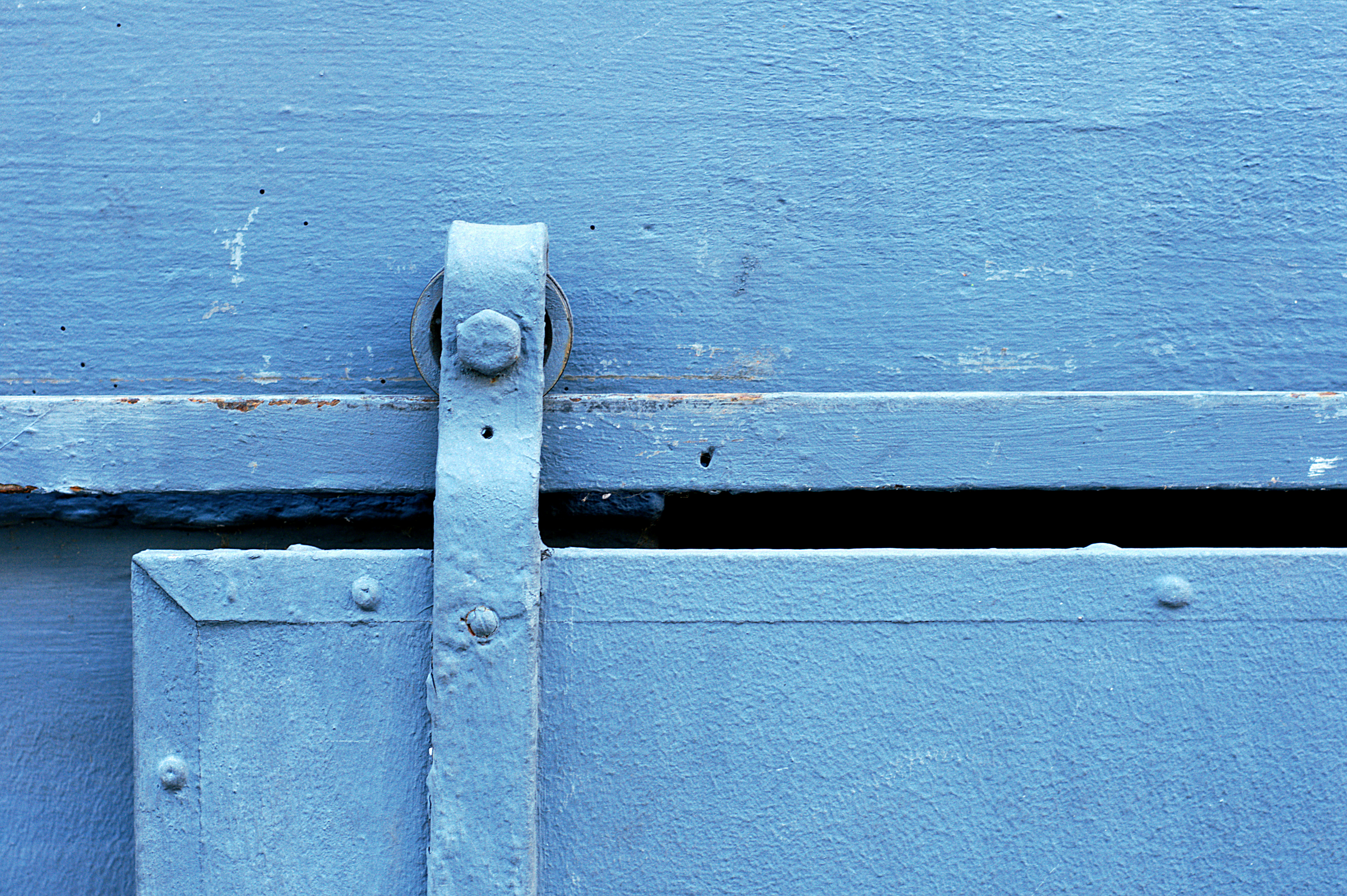
Some sliding doors run on a wall-mounted rail, like this one

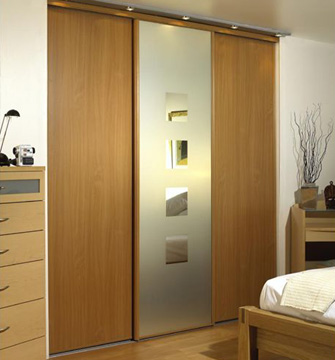
Sliding doors in a modern wardrobe

The 'top-hung' system is most often used. The door is hung by two trolley hangers at the top of the door running in a concealed track; all the weight is taken by the hangers, making the door easier to move.

At each end is a track stopper to absorb any impact made if the door is slammed and to hold the door in the open or closed position. All top-hung sliding door gear systems have a maximum weight limit per pair of trolley hangers.

As the door is hung at the top from two points, it also needs a bottom track/stay roller to prevent it from swinging sideways. The most common type is called 'clear threshold guiding', a floor-fixed plastic guide about 60 millimetres (2.4 in) wide which is fixed below the door at the midpoint of its run. A groove is cut into the bottom of the door which runs over this guide, preventing lateral movement of the door. With a glass door, the panel runs through the guide as illustrated. Because the door is always engaged in the guide, when the door is open, the floor is clear; hence 'clear threshold'.

The bottom of the doors are held in place on tracks. The rollers also have safety locks that prevent the doors from jumping off the tracks. Additional devices include soft-closers and dampeners, which make it easier to close the door gently.

A popular top-hung sliding door type is the barn door, inspired from countryside barns, in modern homes of Scandinavian styles.

=== Bottom-rolling door gear ===
Sometimes a top-hung system cannot be used, as the weight of the door cannot be supported from above; in this case, a bottom-rolling system may be used.

A bottom-rolling system consists of two rollers (sometimes called a sheave) at the bottom of the door running on a track, and two guides at the top running in a guide channel. As all the weight of the door is concentrated on the two bottom wheels, more force is needed to move the door than on a top-hung system.

=== Lift-and-slide door gear ===
A sliding door that is lifted from the frame during opening and closing is called a lift-and-slide door. This allows for a better seal, with less draught and better soundproofing.

== Automatic sliding doors ==
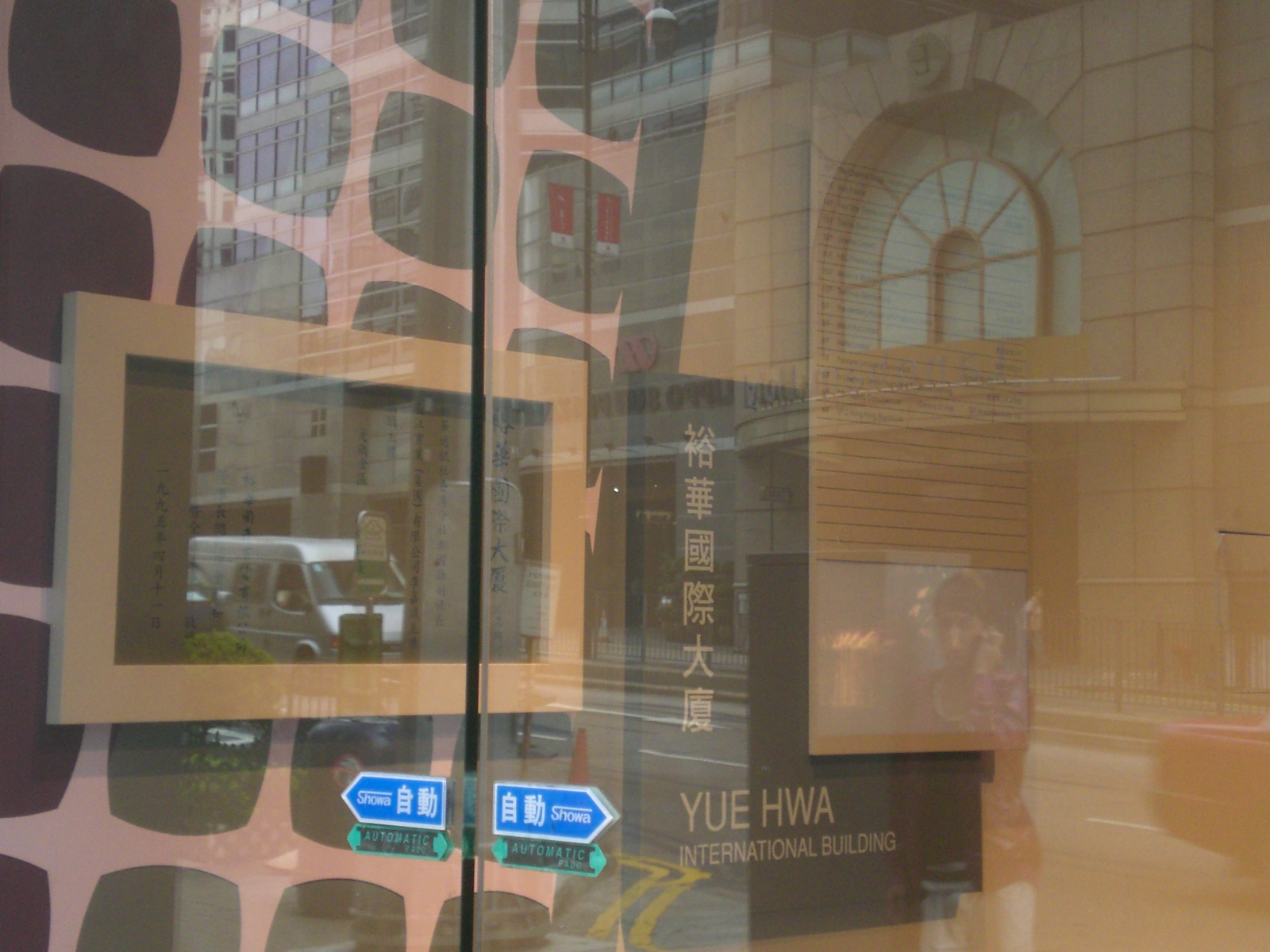
Automatic door in Hong Kong

Some sliding doors contain a motor and activation system to open them, called sliding door operators. Automatic sliding doors are commonly found in offices and shop entrances. These doors contain a magnetic locking mechanism that automatically unlocks during emergencies.

== Usage ==
Advantages of sliding doors are the small space requirements for door-opening, and their relative ease of automation. The mechanism is also secure, since it cannot be lifted out of its hinges. Sliding doors are commonly found as store, hotel, and office entrances, used in elevators, and used as patio doors, closet doors and room dividers. Sliding doors are also used in transportation, such as in vans and both overground and underground trains. Volkswagen used these doors in the Volkswagen Fridolin produced between 1964 and 1974.

== See also ==
- Shoji
