= Fridolin =

Fridolin is a German masculine given name, derived from Old High German. Notable people with this name include:

- Fridolin of Säckingen, Irish missionary, apostle of the Alamanni and founder of Säckingen Abbey
- Fridolin Ambongo Besungu (born 1960), Congolese prelate of the Catholic Church
- Fridolin Anderwert (1828–1880), Swiss politician
- Fridolin Dietsche (1861–1908) was a German sculptor
- Fridolin Friedmann (1897–1976), German-Jewish educator
- Fridolin Glass (1910–1943), Austrian Nazi activist and Schutzstaffel (SS) officer
- Fridolin Hamma (1881–1969), German luthier
- Fridolin Heer (1834–1910), Swiss architect
- Fridolin Marinus Knobel (1857–1933), Dutch diplomat and politician
- Fridolin Kurmann, Swiss field hockey player
- Fridolin Leiber (1853–1912), German painter
- Fridolin Schley (born 1976), German writer
- Fridolin von Senger und Etterlin, German Nazi general
- Fridolin Sicher (1490–1546), Swiss composer and organist
- Fridolin Sulser (1926–2016), Swiss-American pharmacologist
- Fridolin Wagner (born 1997), German footballer
- Fridolin Wenger, Swiss footballer
- Fridolin Yoku (born 1997), Indonesian footballer
- Fridolin Žolna, pen name of Slovene lawyer and writer Fran Milčinski (1867–1932)

== Other uses ==
- Volkswagen Type 147 Kleinlieferwagen, informally nicknamed the Fridolin
- Fridolin Arnault House, located in Wood-Ridge, Bergen County, New Jersey, United States
- Gustav Fridolin (born 1983), Swedish writer, teacher and politician
