= Westfalia-Werke =

Camping - Towing Company

Coordinates: 51°50′42.15″N 8°18′28.61″E

- Formerly: Franz Knobel & Sohn GmbH; Fahrzeugfabrik Westfalia
- Industry: Vehicle customization - Automotive supplier
- Founded: October 1, 1844; 181 years ago in Rheda-Wiedenbrück, Germany
- Founder: Franz Knöbel and Johann Bernard Knöbel
- Headquarters: Rheda-Wiedenbrück, in North Rhine-Westphalia, Germany
- Area served: International
- Key people: Jay Samuel Goldbaum; Matthew Joseph Meyer; Reiner Günter Spatke
- Products: Camping Van Conversion (trailers - towing-cycle carriers)
- Brands: Westfalia; Volkswagen Westfalia Camper; Bikelander
- Revenue: 190 Million Euro (2015)
- Number of employees: ~700 (2019)
- Parent: Rapido Group (since 2011)
- Subsidiaries: Westfalia Van Conversion GmbH. now Westfalen Mobil GmbH; Westfalia-Automotive GmbH (trailer couplings, cycle carriers); Westfalia Trailer Group GmbH (close 2002)
- Website: Westfalia-Automotive GmbH www.westfalia-automotive.com/uk/; Westfalen Mobil GmbH westfalia-mobil.de/en/; Rapido Group corporate-rapido.com/en/

Westfalia Franz Knöbel & Söhne in 1920 in Rheda-Wiedenbrück, in North Rhine-Westphalia, Germany

Westfalia-Werke (Westfalia works), now two firms: Westfalia-Automotive GmbH and Westfalen Mobil GmbH, are a manufacturer of automotive camping equipment and trailers. Westfalia-Werke is based in Rheda-Wiedenbrück in North Rhine-Westphalia in Germany. Westfalia invented the ball head trailer hitch in 1934. Westfalia is best known for Volkswagen Westfalia Campers. Westfalia is a leading manufacturer of trailer hitches for cars and light commercial vehicles. Westfalia also manufactures a line of automotive bicycle racks.

== History ==
Westfalia traces its founding back to Johann Bernard Knöbel, who opened a blacksmith shop in Wiedenbrück on October 1, 1844. The blacksmith shop was passed on to Knöbel two sons Wilhelm and Franz. Wilhelm and Franz added wagon and saddlery products to the business. Near the end of World War I, the two brothers ended their blacksmith partnership. Franz Knöbel changed the blacksmith shop to the manufacture of hunting wagons and horse-drawn sleighs, founding Franz Knobel & Sohn GmbH. In 1918, the company built a self-propelled carriage. In 1922, Franz Knöbel called his new company Westfalia, Fahrzeugfabrik Westfalia (Vehicle factory Westfalia). In the 1920s he start making a line of automobile products, including trailers, truck body, coachbuilding and taxi cab conversions. Before 1932, trailers used only jaw or hook couplings with an eyelet for trailer towing. In 1932, Franz Knöbel developed the trailer hitch with a ball head and socket joint. Franz Knöbel patented the ball head-socket joint trailer hitch invention on March 14, 1934. Westfalia hold a number of towing patents.

The first camping conversions was the Volkswagen Camping Box, built by request in 1951 on a Volkswagen Type 2 van. The request was for VW van to have a sleeping, living and working space. As cars and truck power increased Westfalia built motorhomes and camping trailers. In the 1960s Westfalia built driver's cab for the Mercedes unimog. In 1966, Westfalia was the first manufacturer to market a removable trailer coupling using bolt on system. In 1987, Westfalia introduced a fully automatically removable trailer coupling.

In 1999, Westfalia-Werke divided into three divisions:

- Westfalia Van Conversion GmbH (motorhomes), now Westfalen Mobil GmbH
- Westfalia-Automotive GmbH (trailer couplings, towbars, and cycle carriers.)
- Westfalia Trailer Group GmbH (Westfalia-Trailergroup). In 2002 went bankrupt.

In 2002, Westfalia introduced an electrically swiveling trailer hitch. In 2006 Westfalia took over trailer coupling manufacturer SIARR in France. In 2007 Westfalia took over of the trailer coupling manufacturer Monoflex in Sweden. In 2008, Westfalia introduced a wide range of bicycle rack systems.

On 28 January 2010, Westfalia-Werke filed for bankruptcy after having a 40 percent drop in sales. Under bankruptcy restructure Westfalia-Werke was able to stay open. In 2011 Westfalia was acquired by the Rapido Group, a French motorhome company.

Westfalia-Automotive GmbH now has 1,700 different types of trailer coupling covering almost all vehicle makes. In October 2016, Westfalia-Automotive trailer couplings was sold to the American trailer hitch manufacturer Horizon Global Corporation.

== Products ==
- In the early 1950 Westfalia built a number of built outs for the Gutbrod Atlas delivery truck. Westfalia built 866 Gutbrod Superior four-seater estate cars.
- In the last 1956, Westfalia built motorhomes on the DKW Schnellaster.
- Westfalia built complete small camping trailers and has done camper conversions on number of vans.
- Westfalia-Werke is most known for its Volkswagen Westfalia Camper conversions from 1950s to 2003. The VW camper has been in the models of VWs called: VW Bus T2; Volkswagen Type 2 (T3) called Vanagon; and the Volkswagen Transporter (T4) called the EuroVan.
- Westfalia has also built a camper van, Marco Polo , on Mercedes-Benz Vito starting in 1996.
- Westfalia built the model Michelangelo on the Fiat Scudo van starting in 2009.
- Westfalia built the model James Cook on thee Mercedes-Benz Sprinter van starting in 2006.
- Westfalia built the model Nugget on the Ford Transit Custom van starting in 1985.
- Westfalia built the model Sven Hedin type 2 on the Volkswagen Crafter van starting in 2017.
- Westfalia trailers such as B. Jupiter, Saturn, XXL and Rodeo were manufactured in Rheda-Wiedenbrück. In 2002 the Westfalia-Trailer group went bankrupt. In 2003, former Heinemann employees found Westfalia-Heinemann AG which went bankrupt in 2004. Westfalia Trailer Systems GmbH was founded in 2005. This company acquired the rights of use to the corresponding brands, production tools, etc. of the former Westfalia-Heinemann AG from a South African company, which were purchased by the insolvency administrator in 2005. Today, Westfalia Trailer Systems produces horse and other trailers under the name "Westfalia" in Obergoseln, Saxony.
- In 2024 Westfalia is returning to the North America with a new camper van (Class B campervan based on a Ram ProMaster-Fiat Ducato.

== Gallery ==
A 1927 Westfalia built taxi cab on a Citroën B 14C Estate.

Mercedes Nürburg with a trailer built by Westfalia in 1928

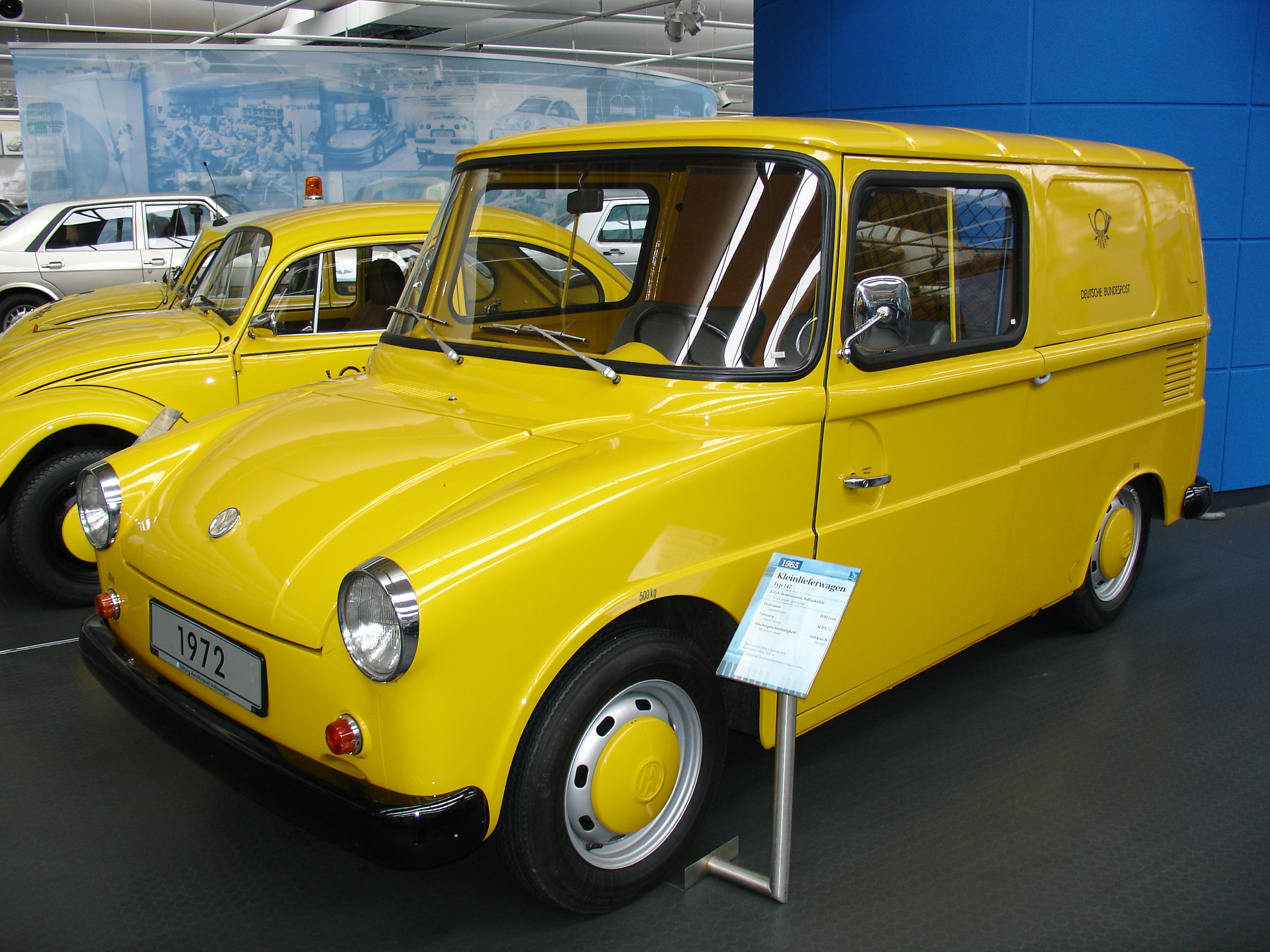
Fridolin, the body was built by Westfalia under contract from VW for the Bundespost post office from 1964 to 1974 on a Karmann Ghia

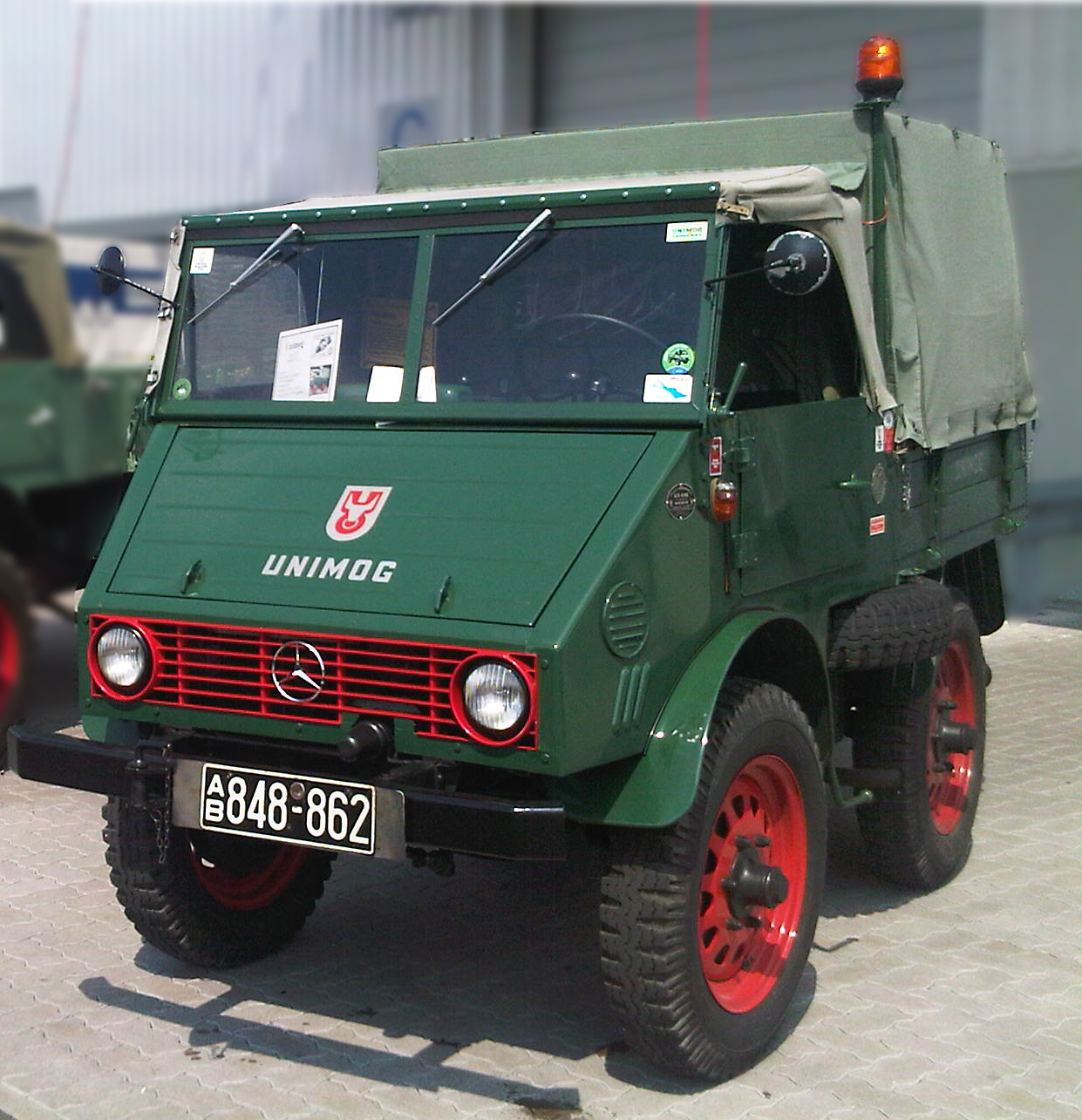
Westfalia built driver cab for the Mercedes unimog

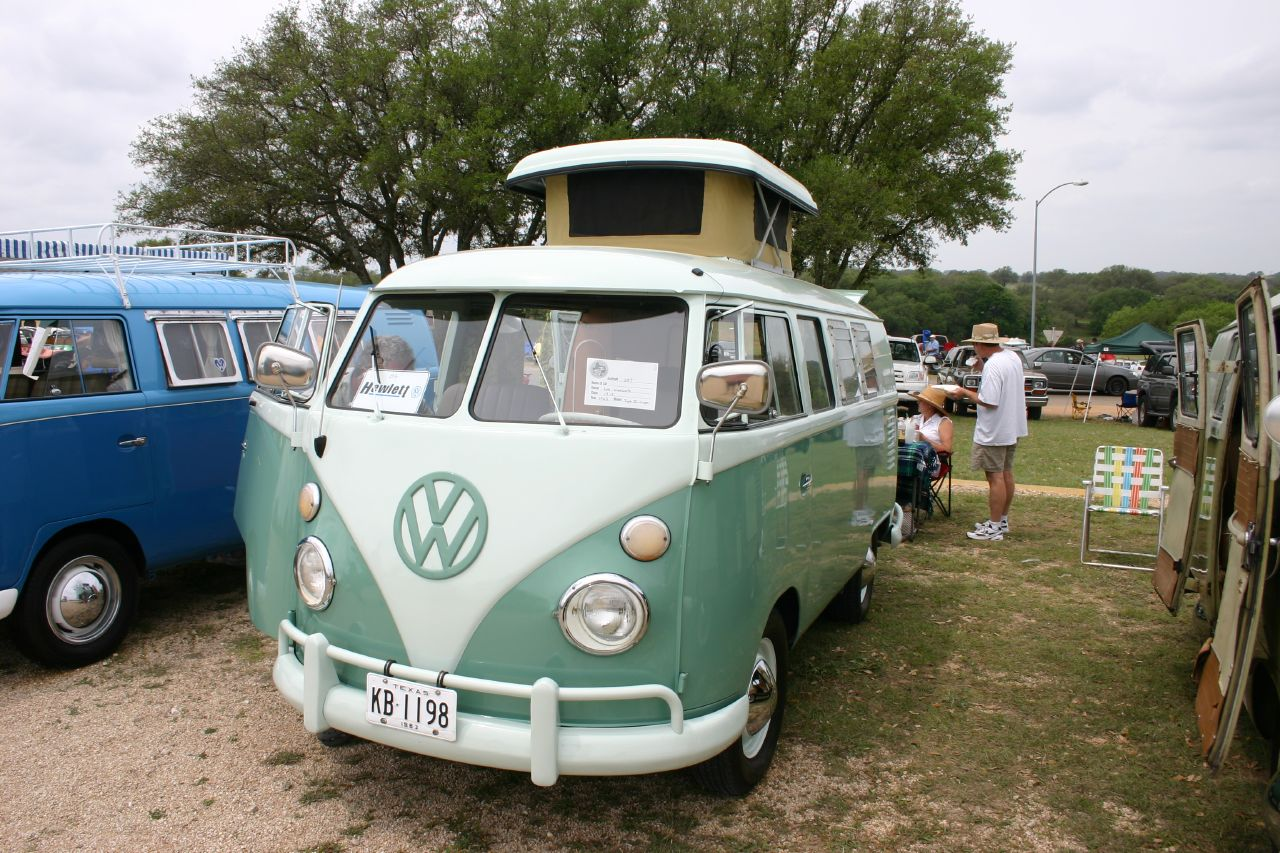
Split-windshield VW Camper

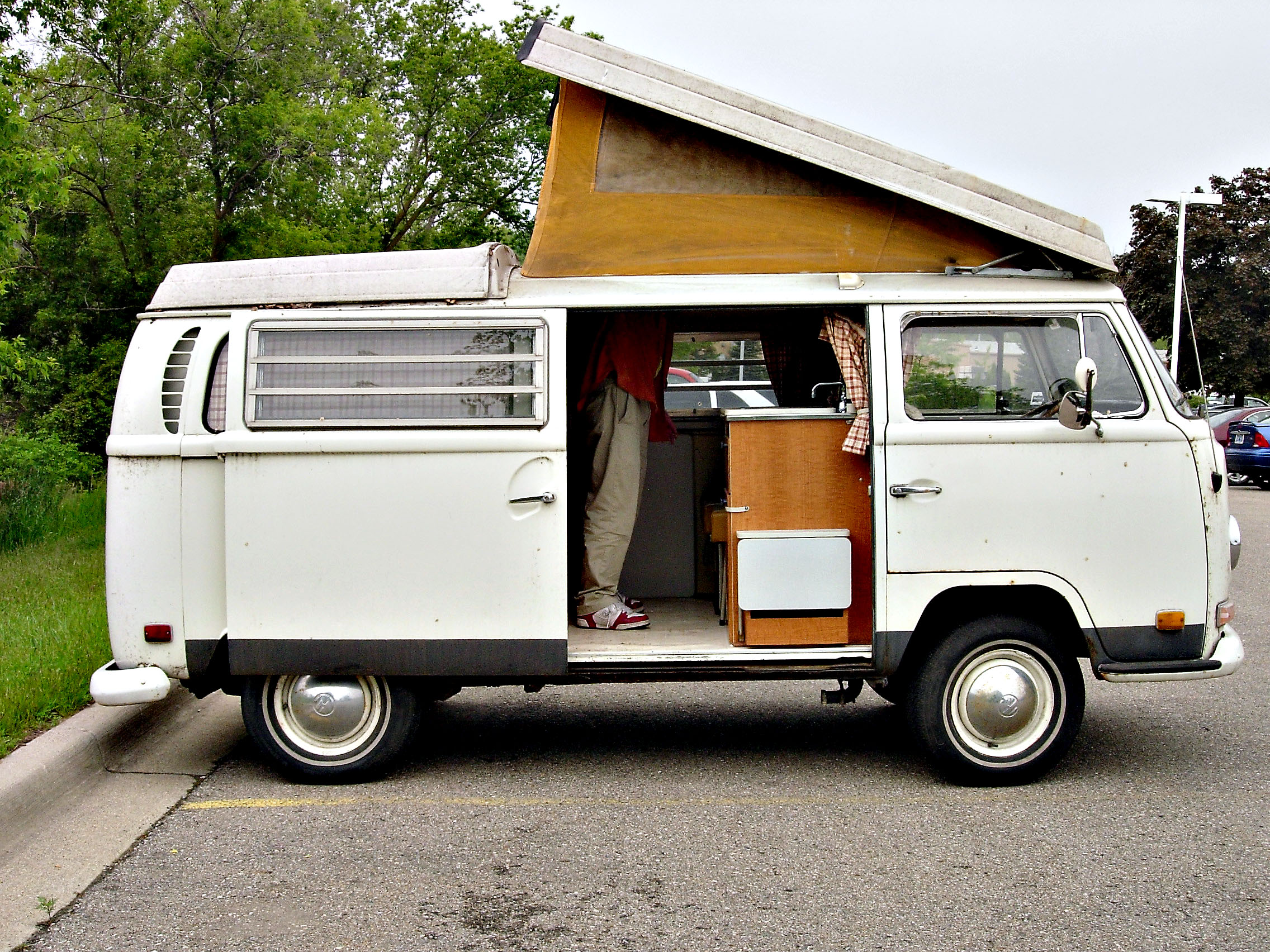
1970 Volkswagen T2 Westfalia

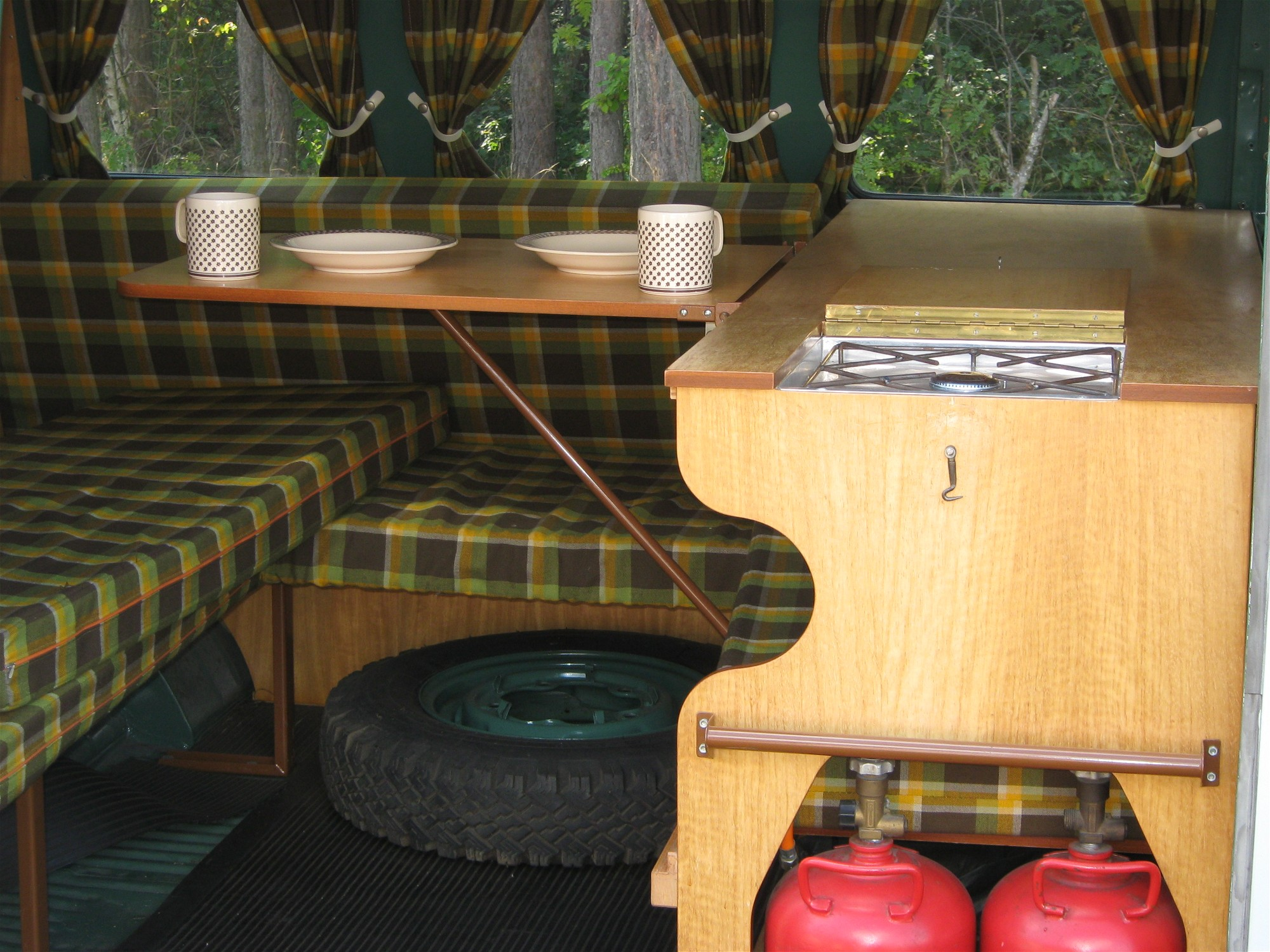
Westfalia Campingbox on early VW bus

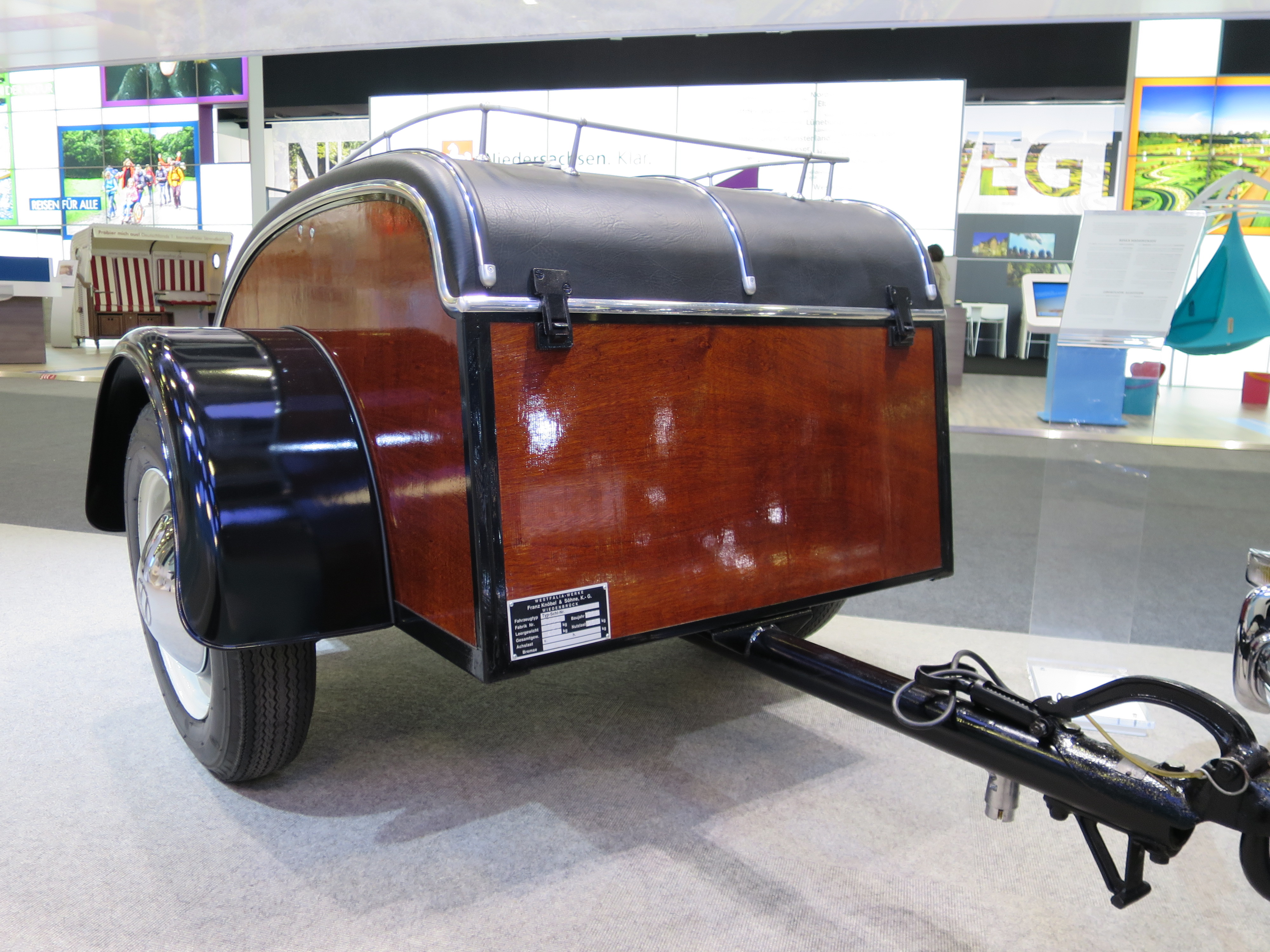
1958 Westfalia Wolfsburg trailer

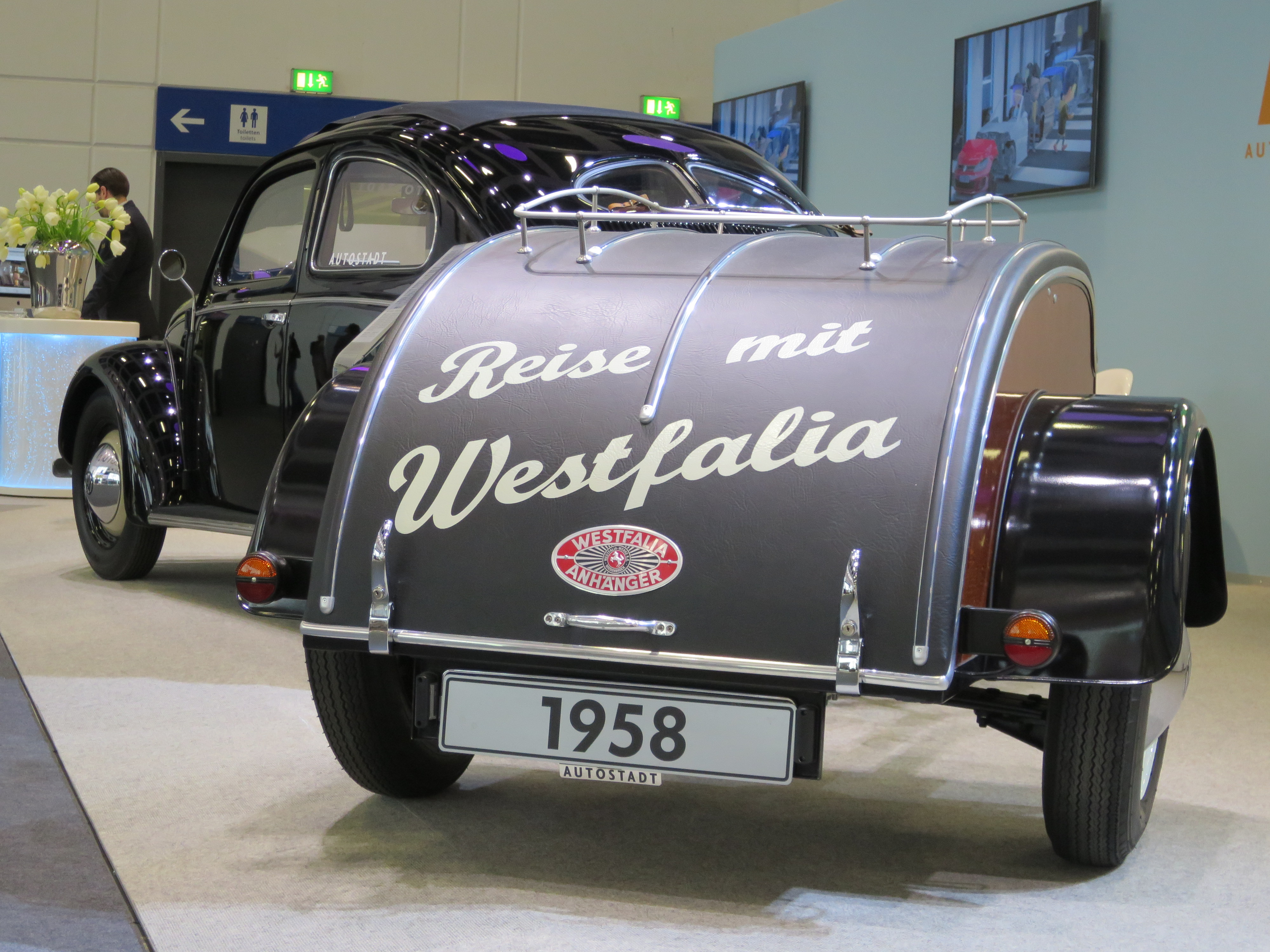
1958 Westfalia Wolfsburg trailer

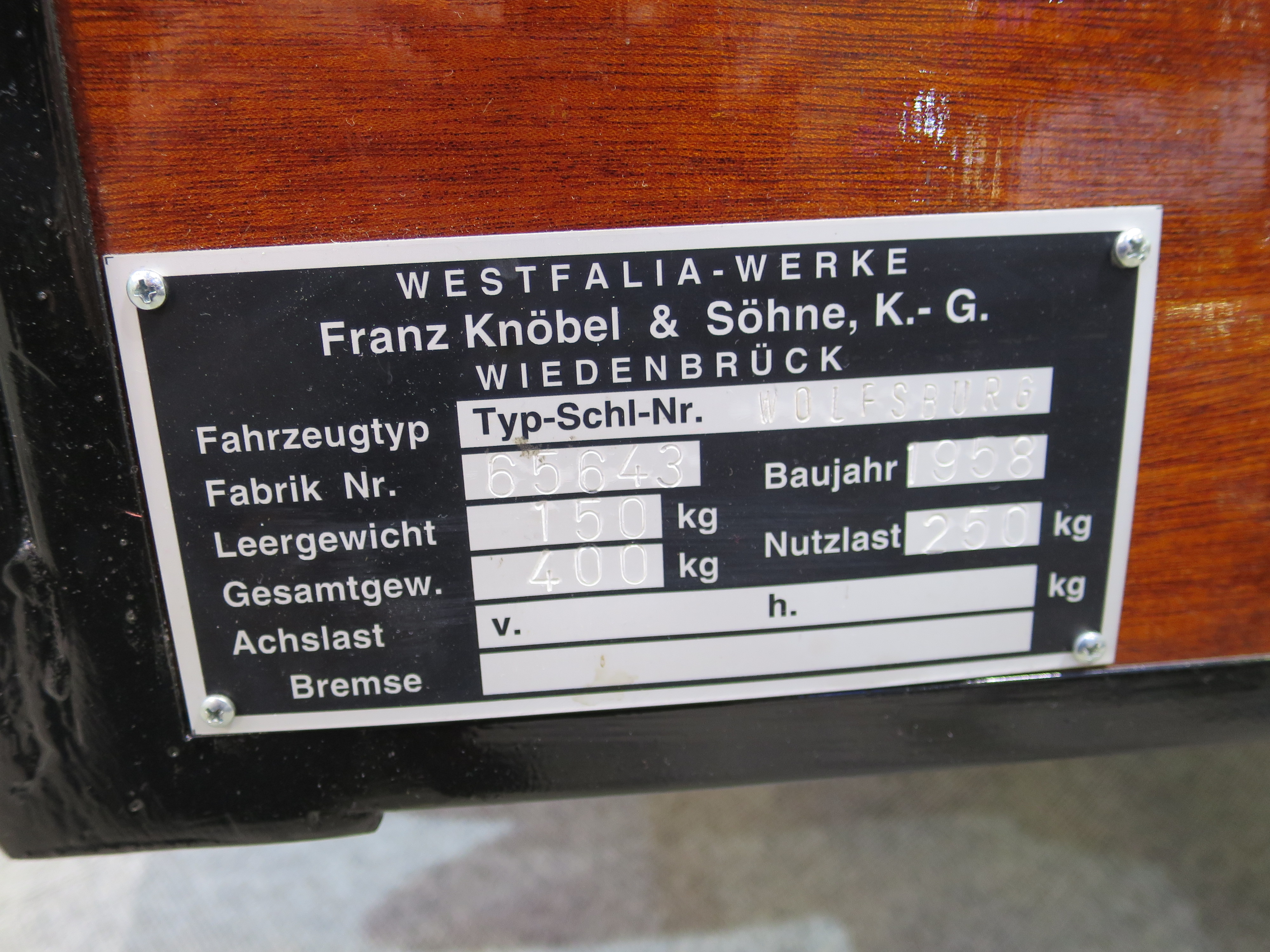
1958 Westfalia Wolfsburg trailer name plate

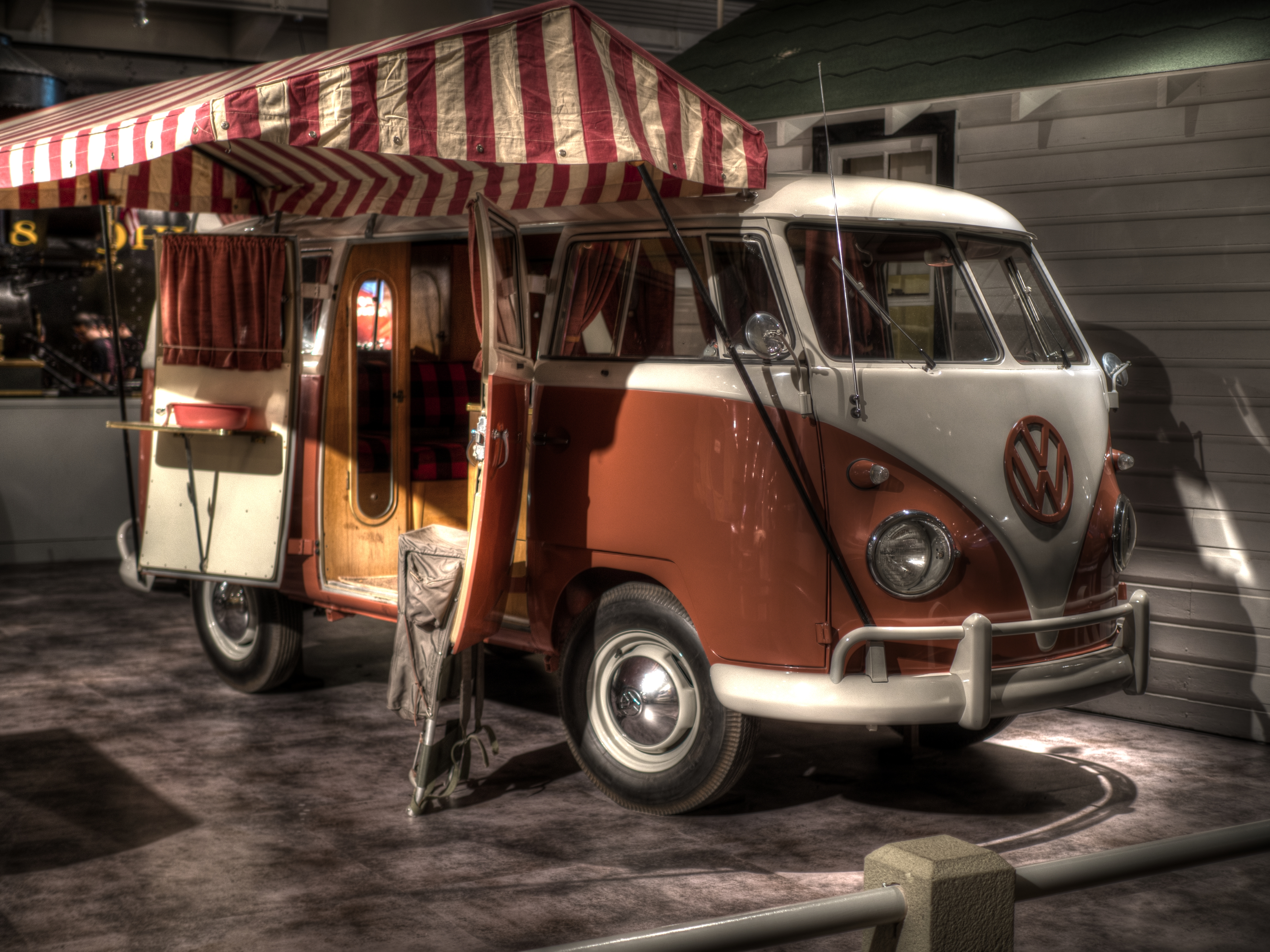
1959 Volkswagen Westfalia Camper

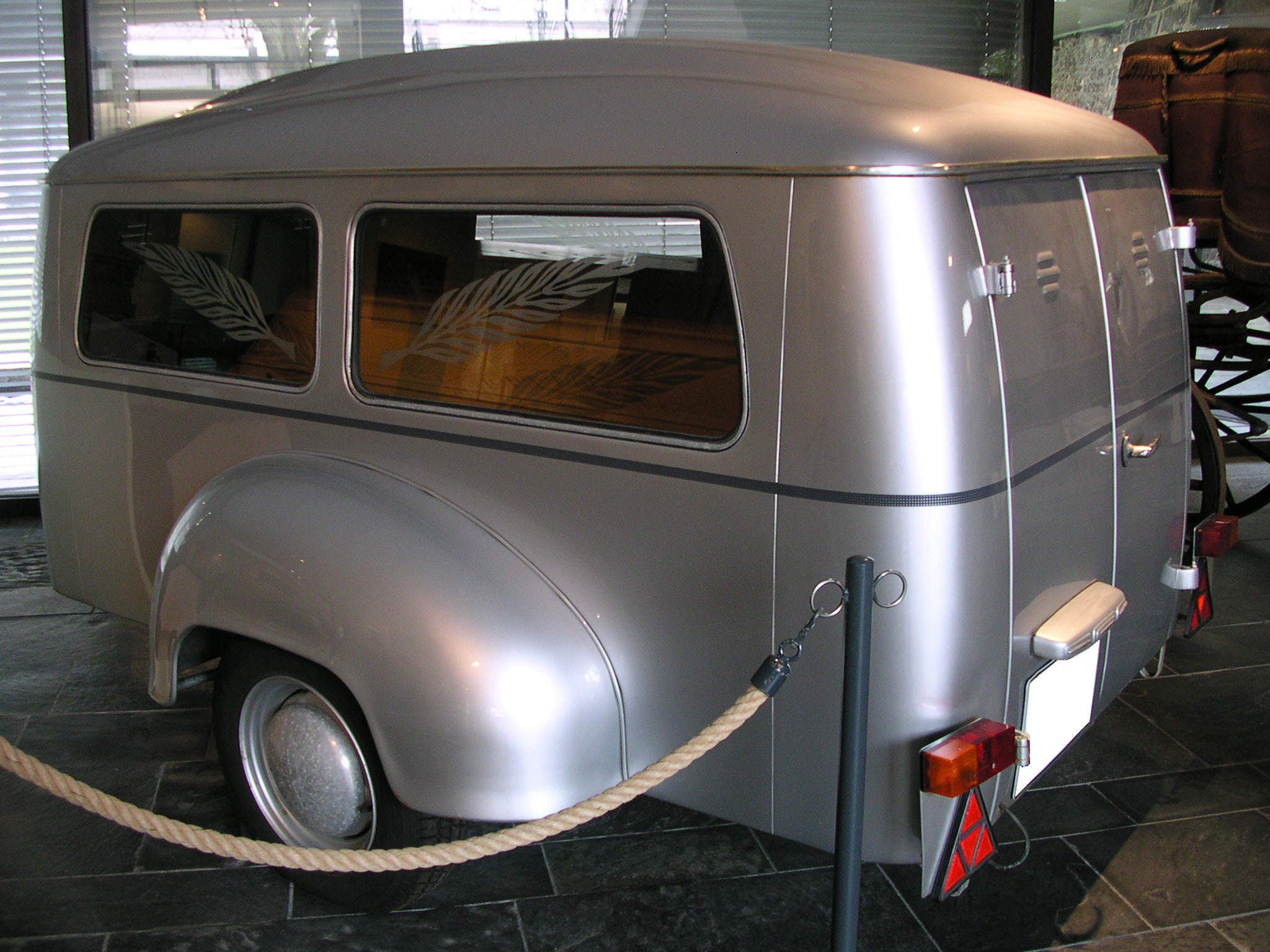
1964 Westfalia camping trailer, (Westfalia Leichenwagen-Anhänger)

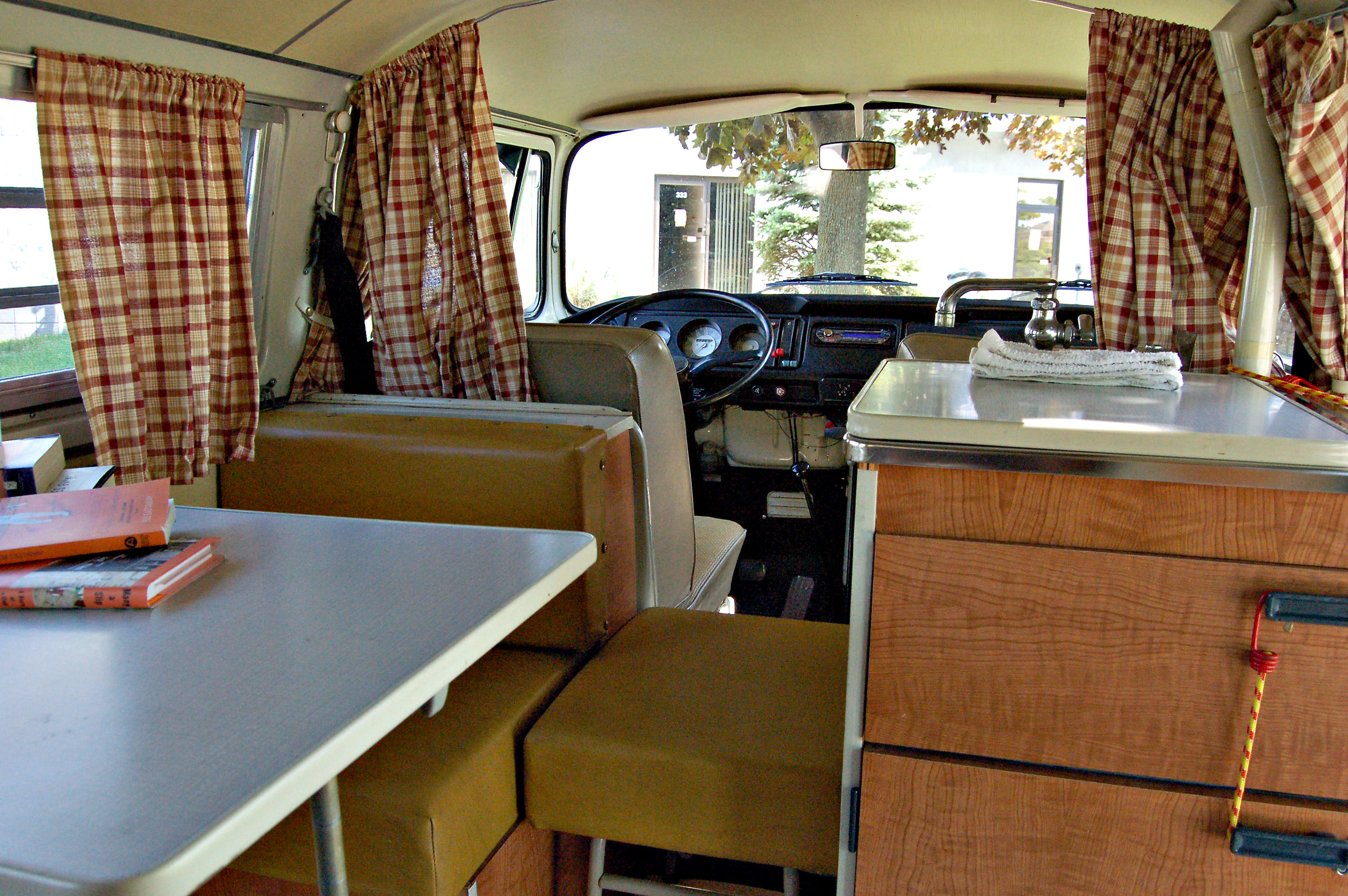
Westfalia 1970 VW bus

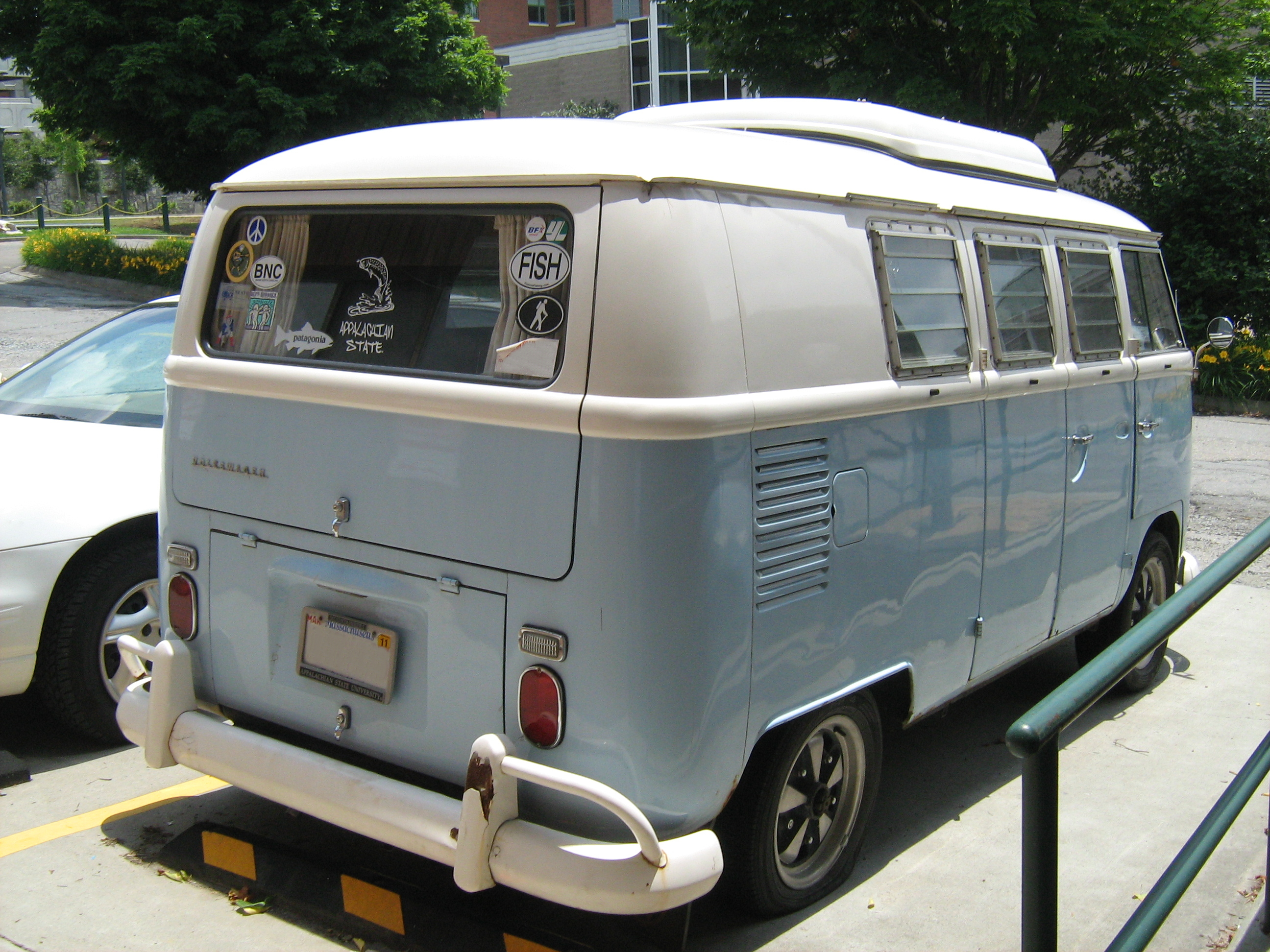
Split-windshield VW Camper

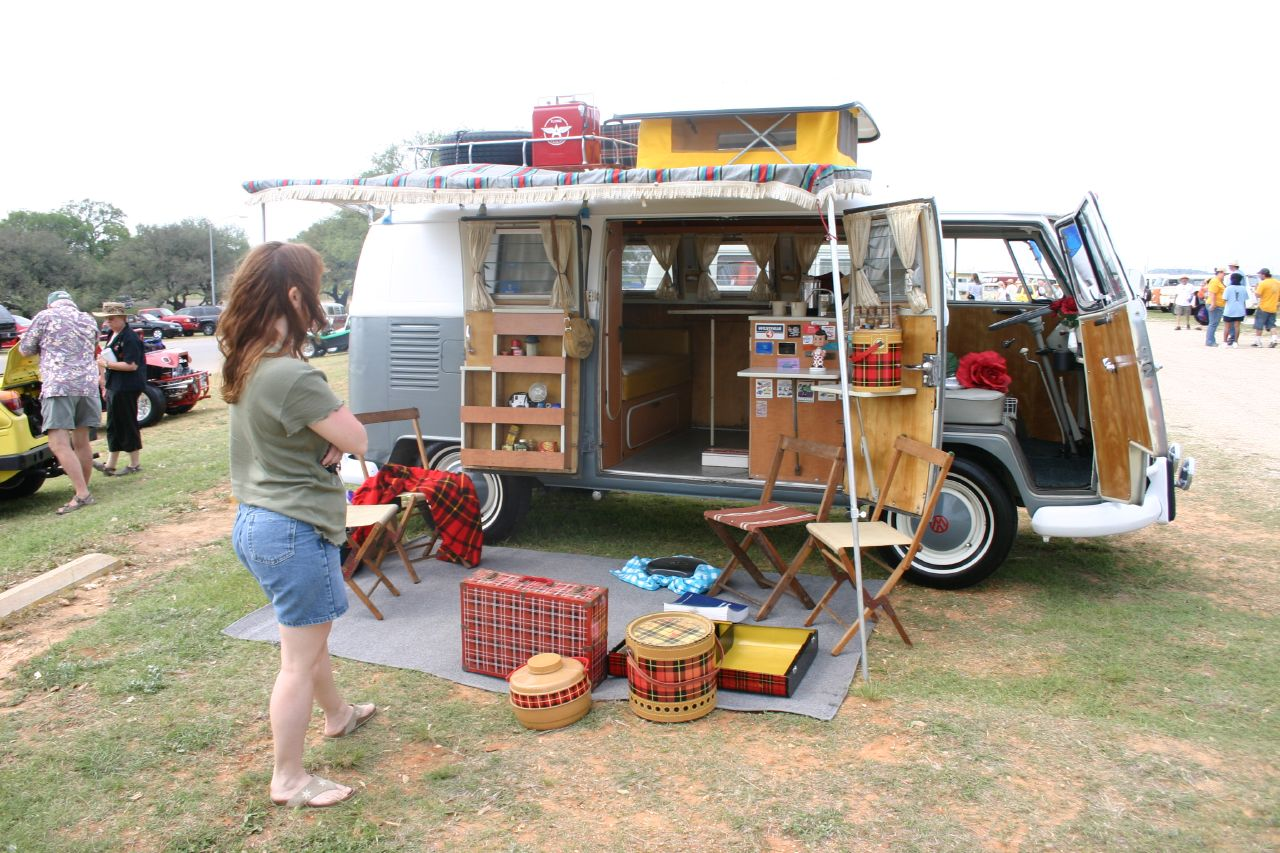
Westfalia split-windshield camper with options, Westy

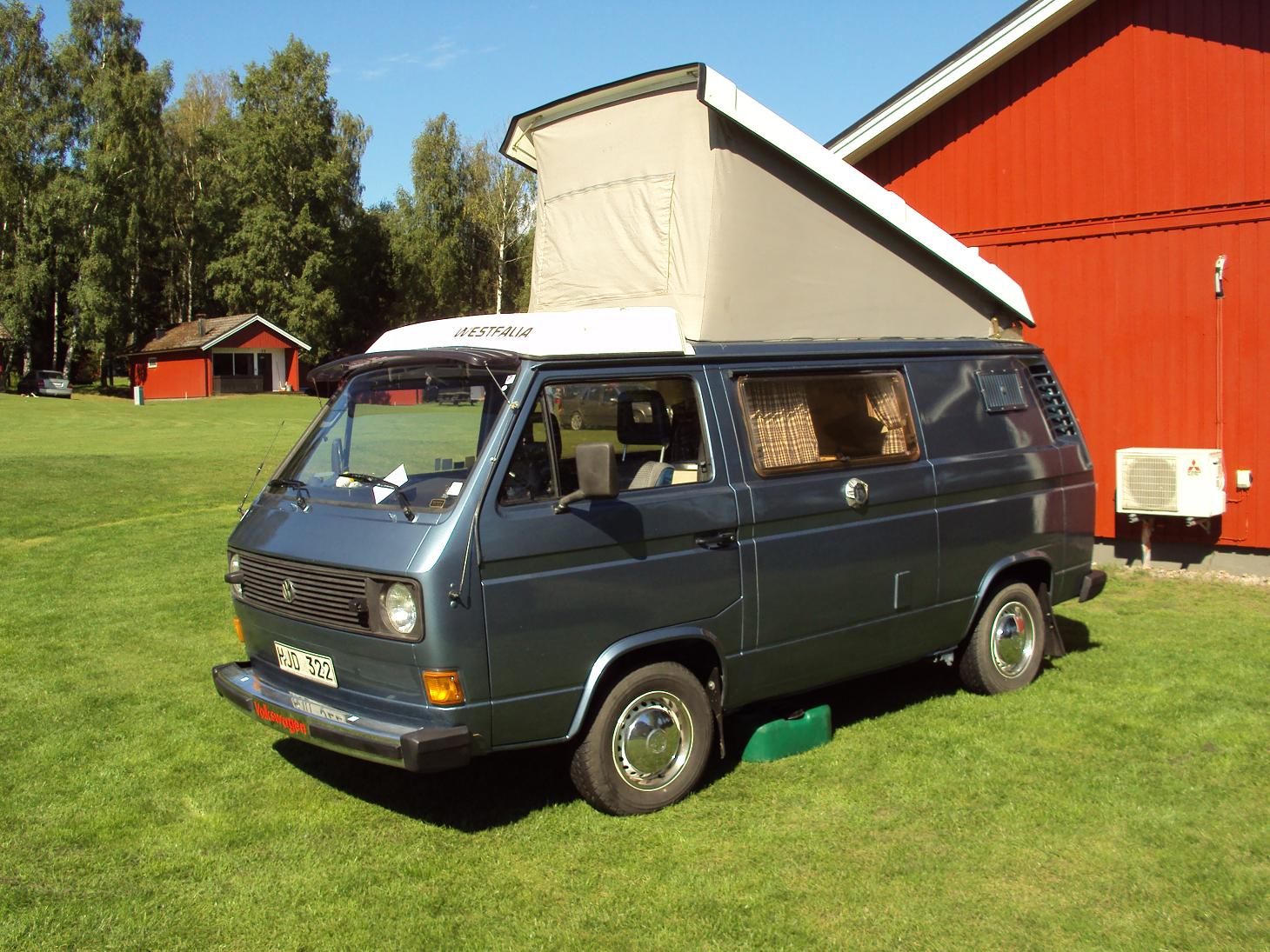
Volkswagen T3 Westfalia Camper - Vanagon

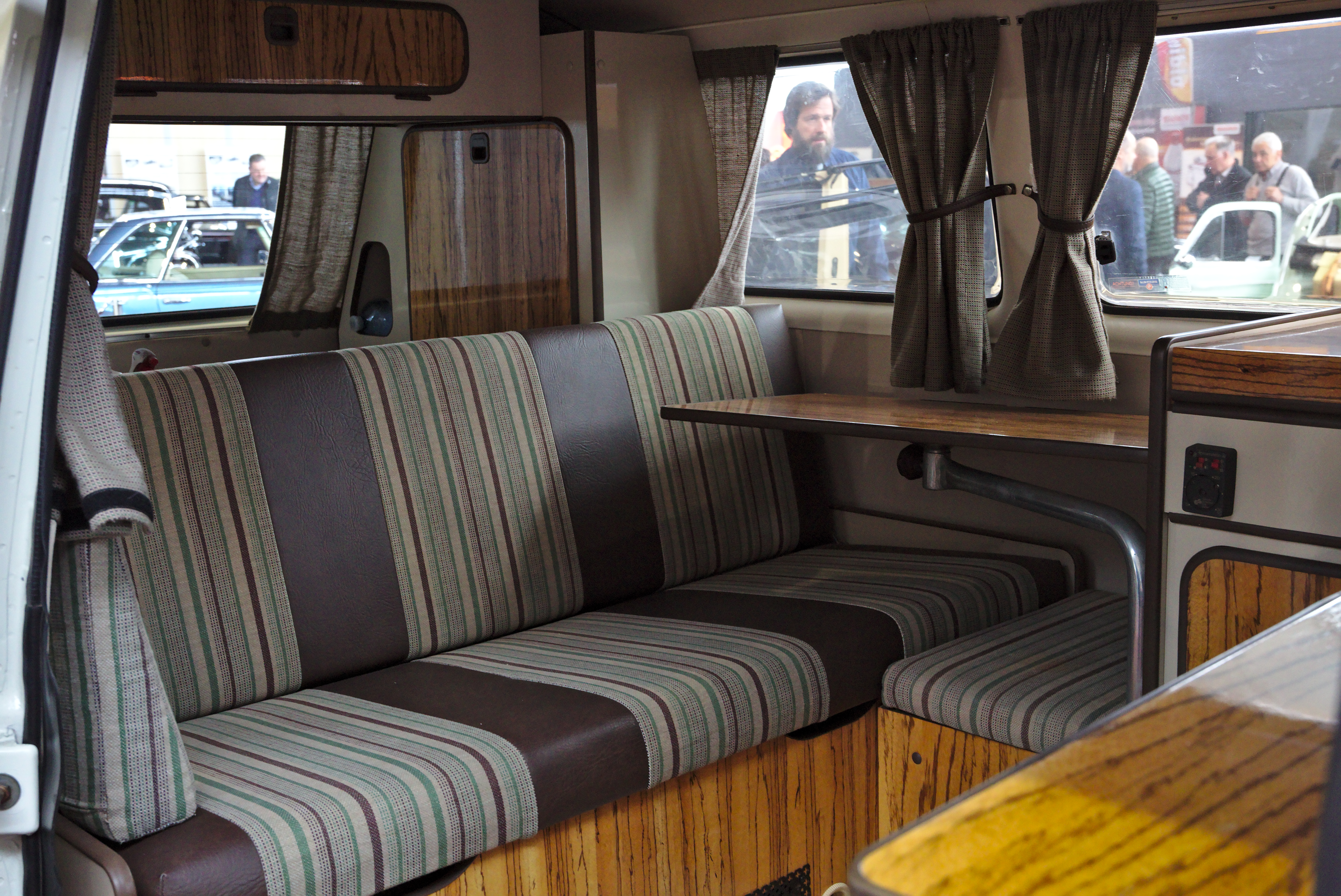
Vanagon inside

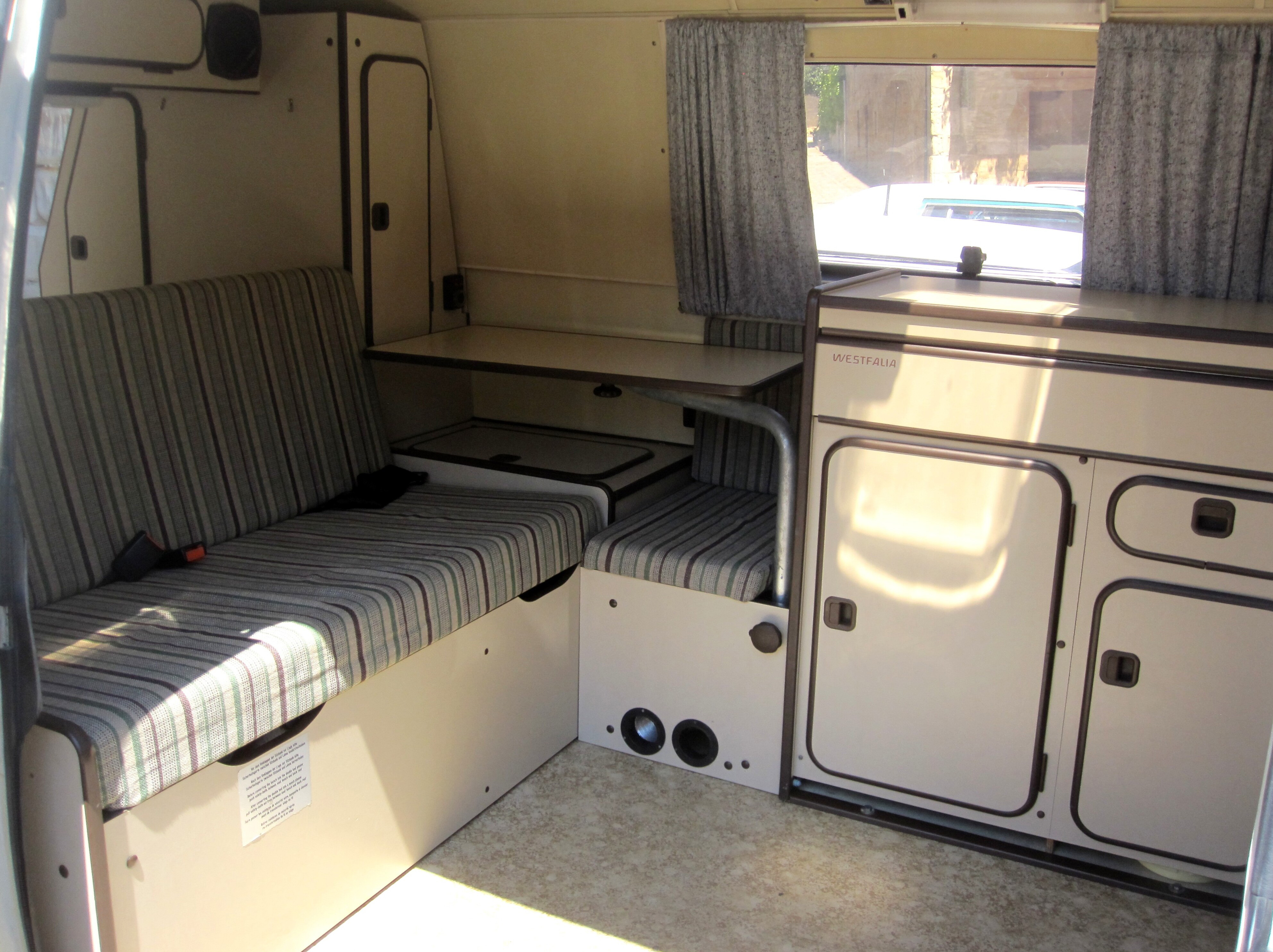
Vanagon inside

1982 Westfalia VW Vanagon bed and stove

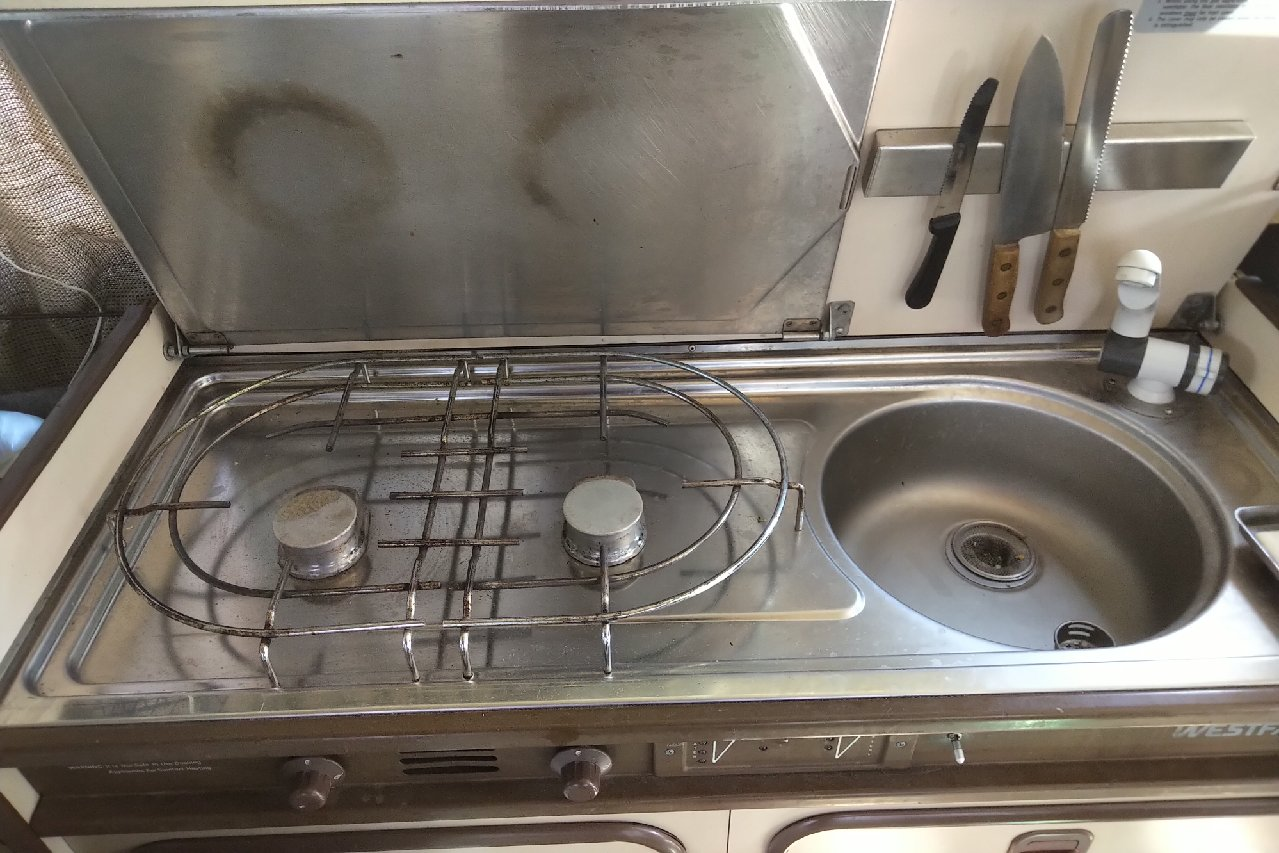
Vangon Westfalia stove and sink

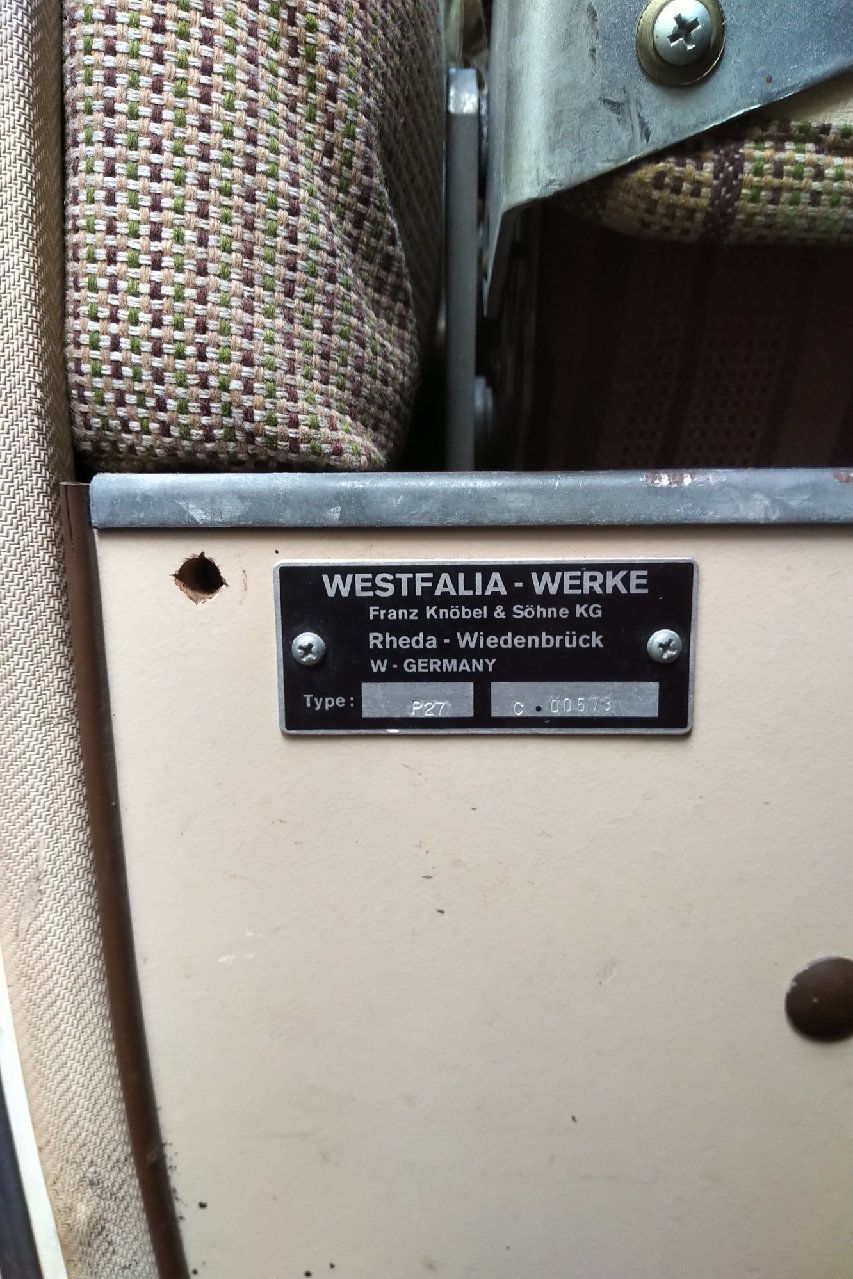
Vangon Westfalia name plate, used on all Westfalia products

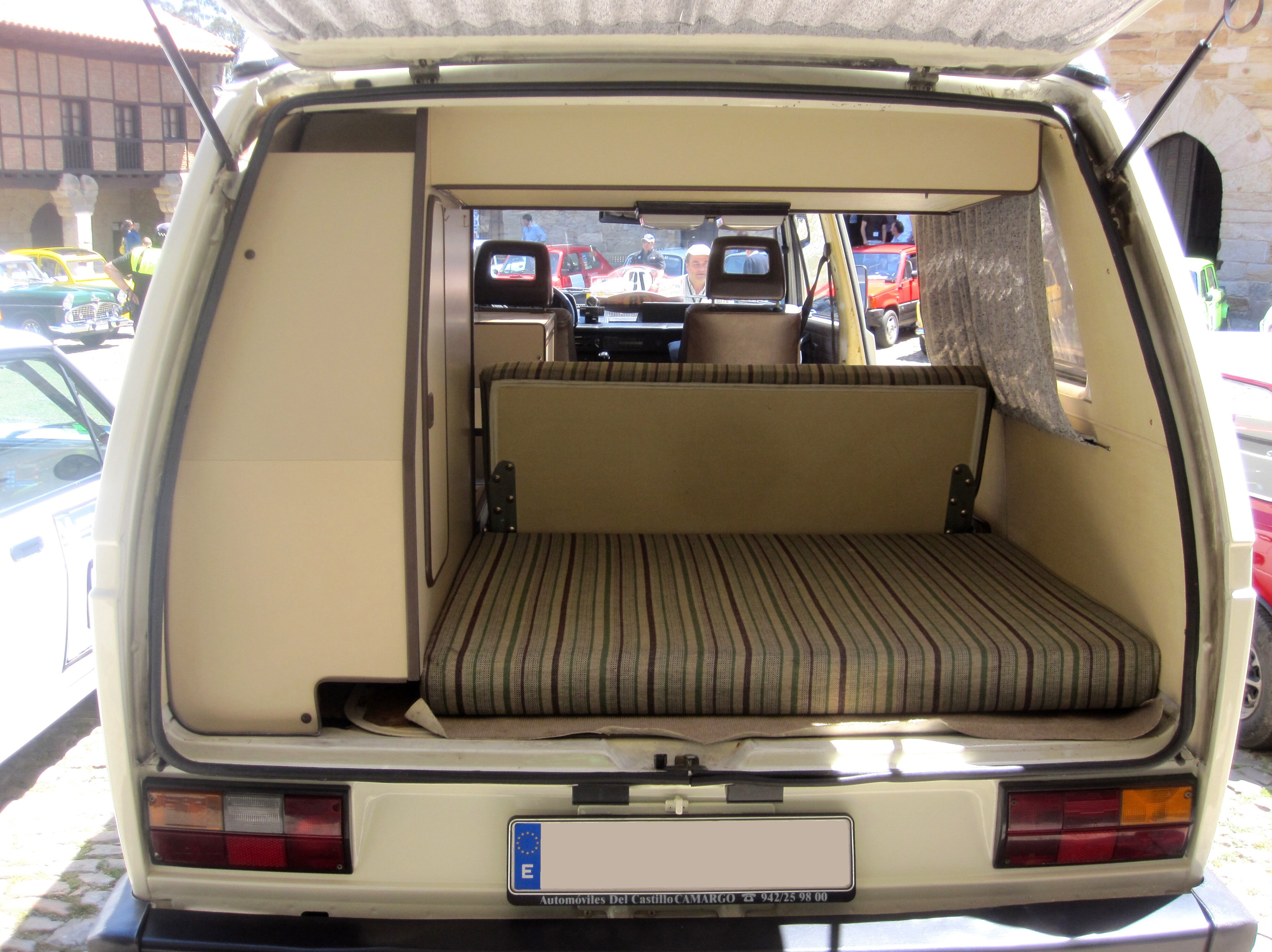
Vanagon rear bed

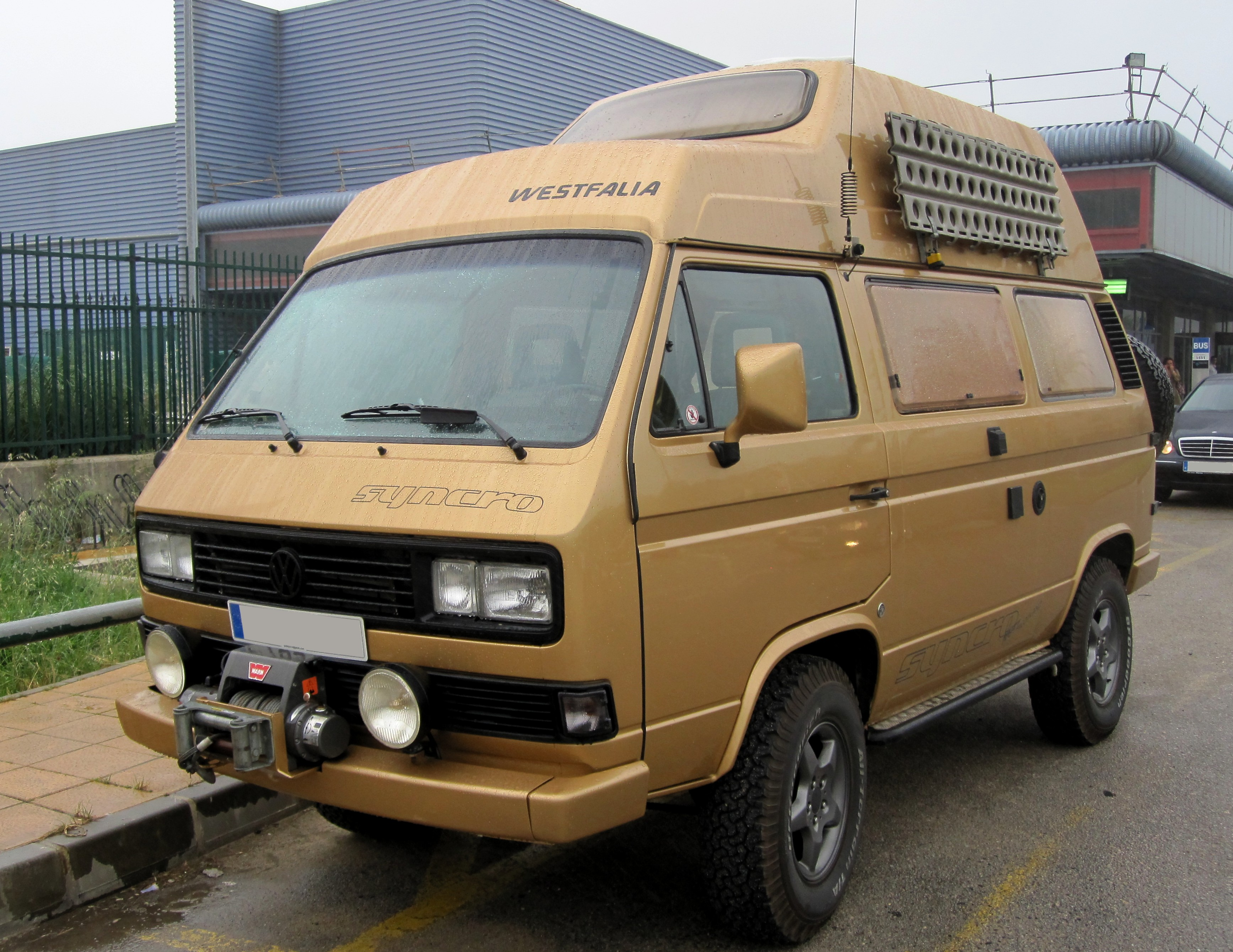
1989 Volkswagen Caravelle Club Westfalia Syncro, a 4X4 Vanagon

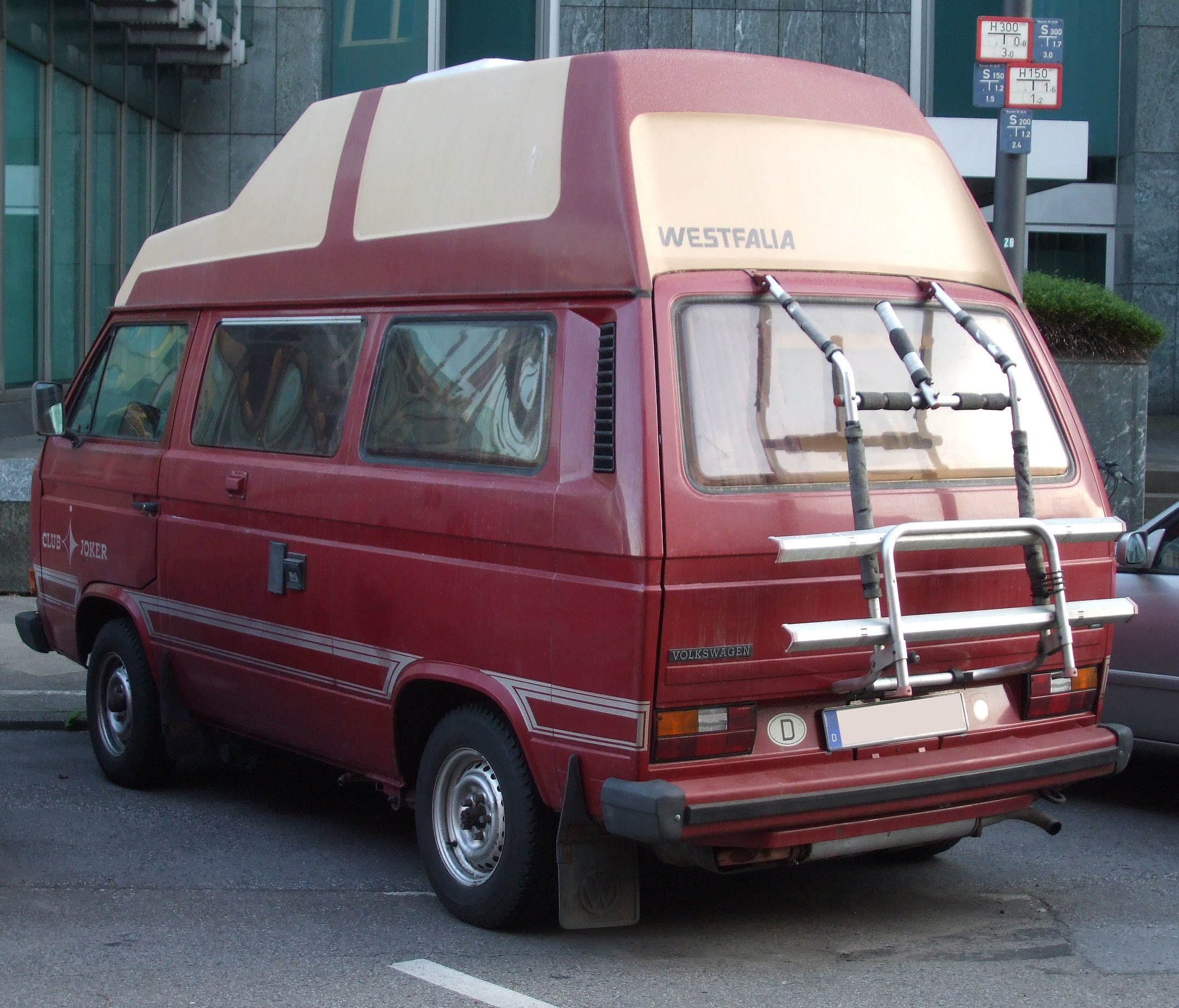
Westfalia Club-Joker VW

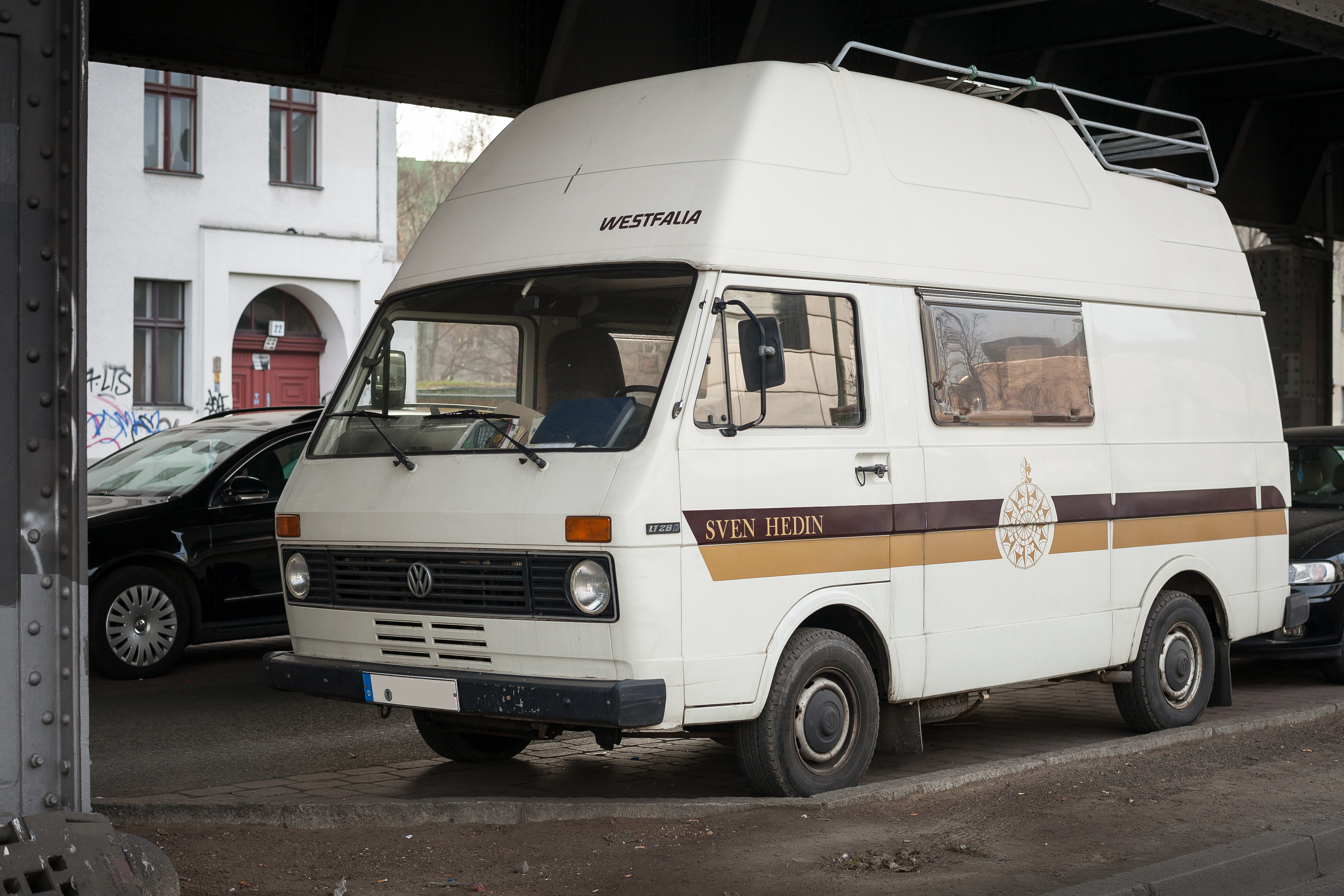
Volkswagen LT Camper Westfalia hard top, Sven Hedin

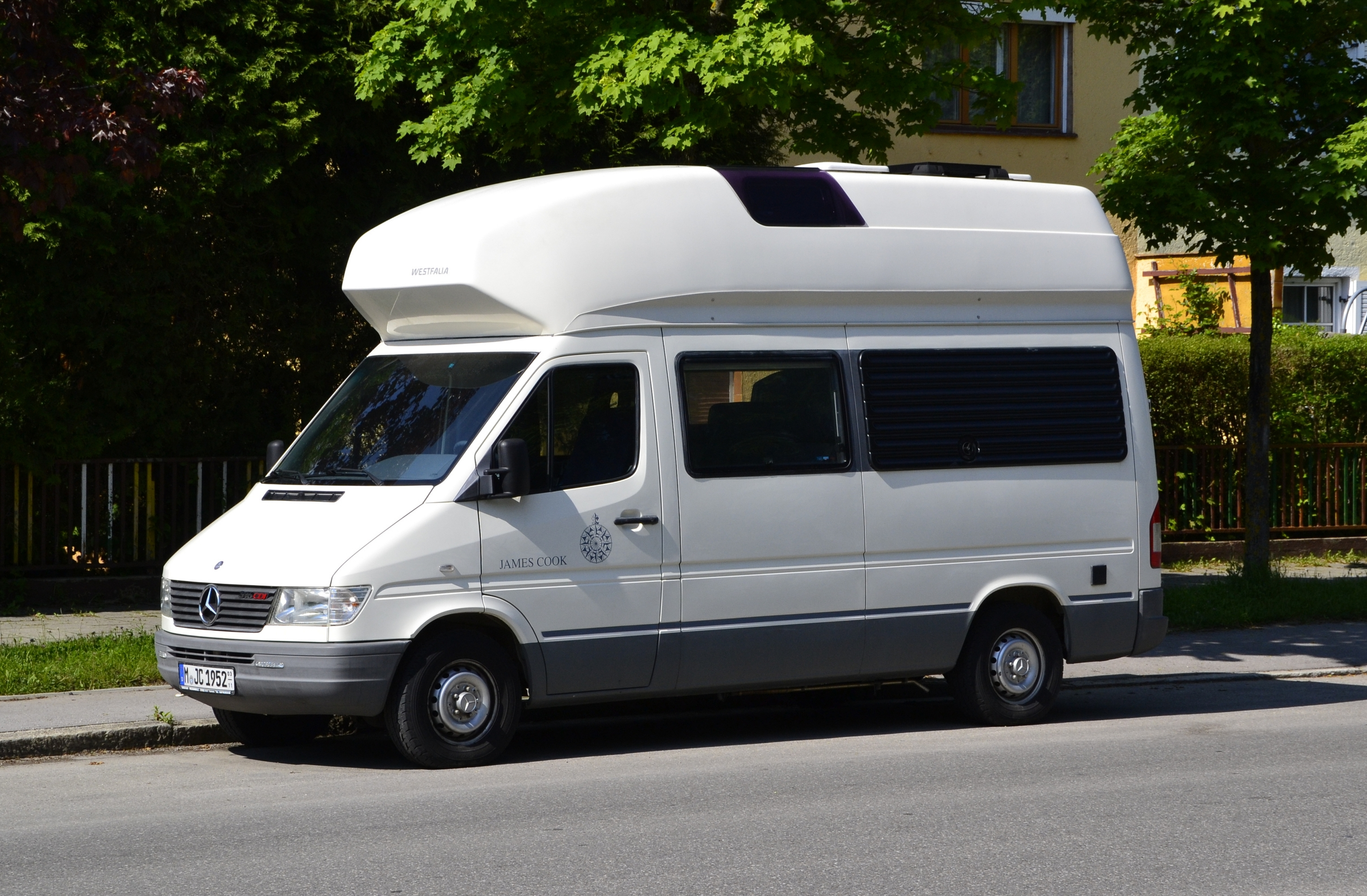
Westfalia James Cook in Munich

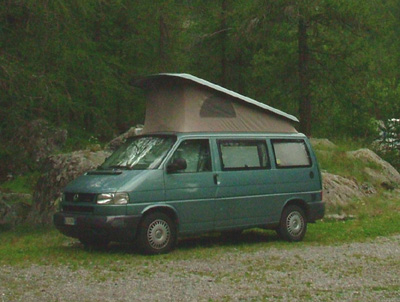
2000 VW Camper on a Volkswagen EuroVan

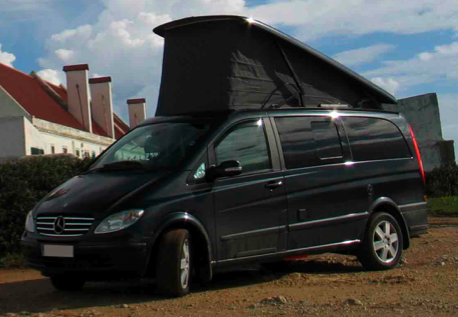
Westfalia, Marco Polo camping edition on a Mercedes-Benz Vito

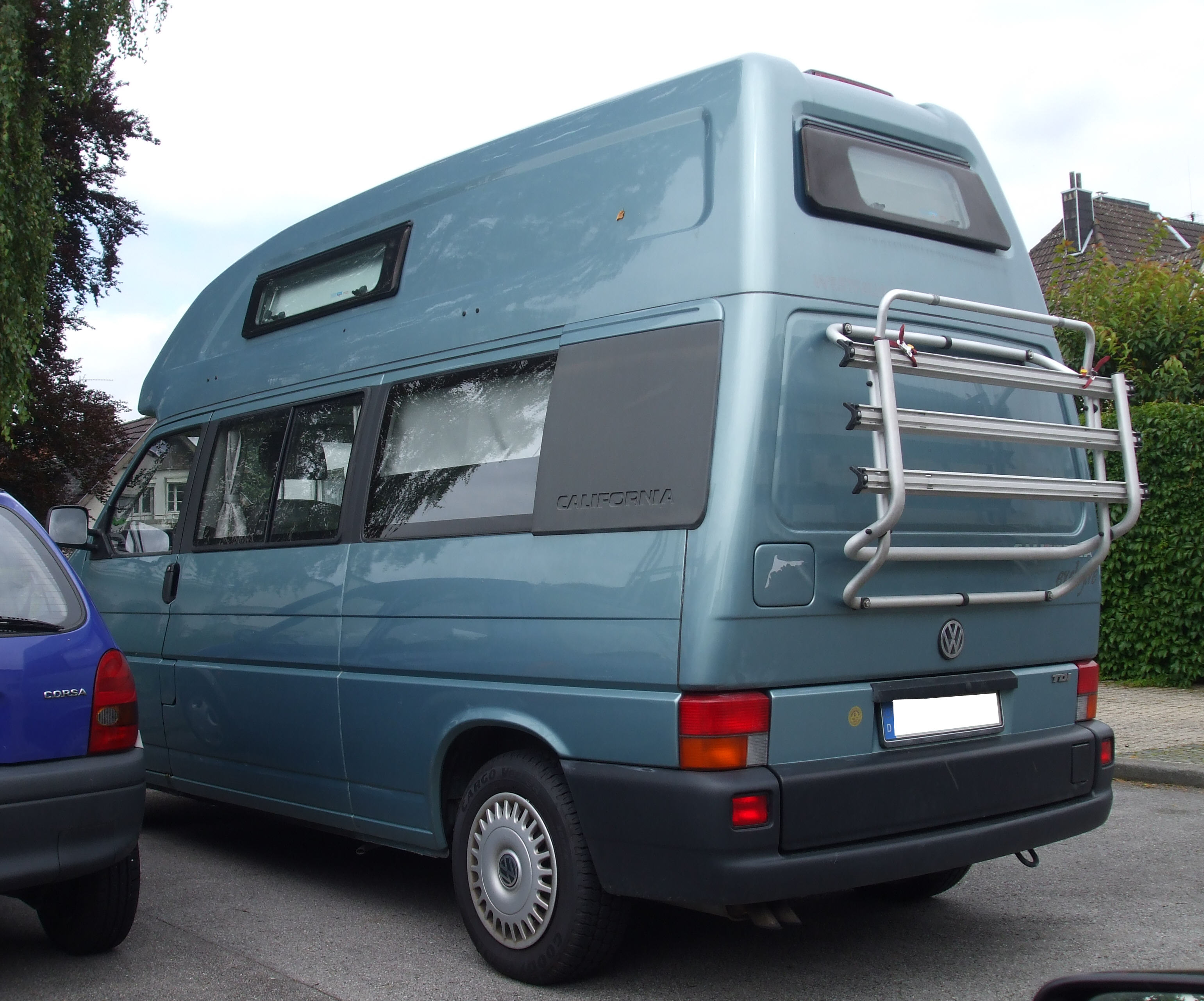
Westfalia California a VW T4 camper

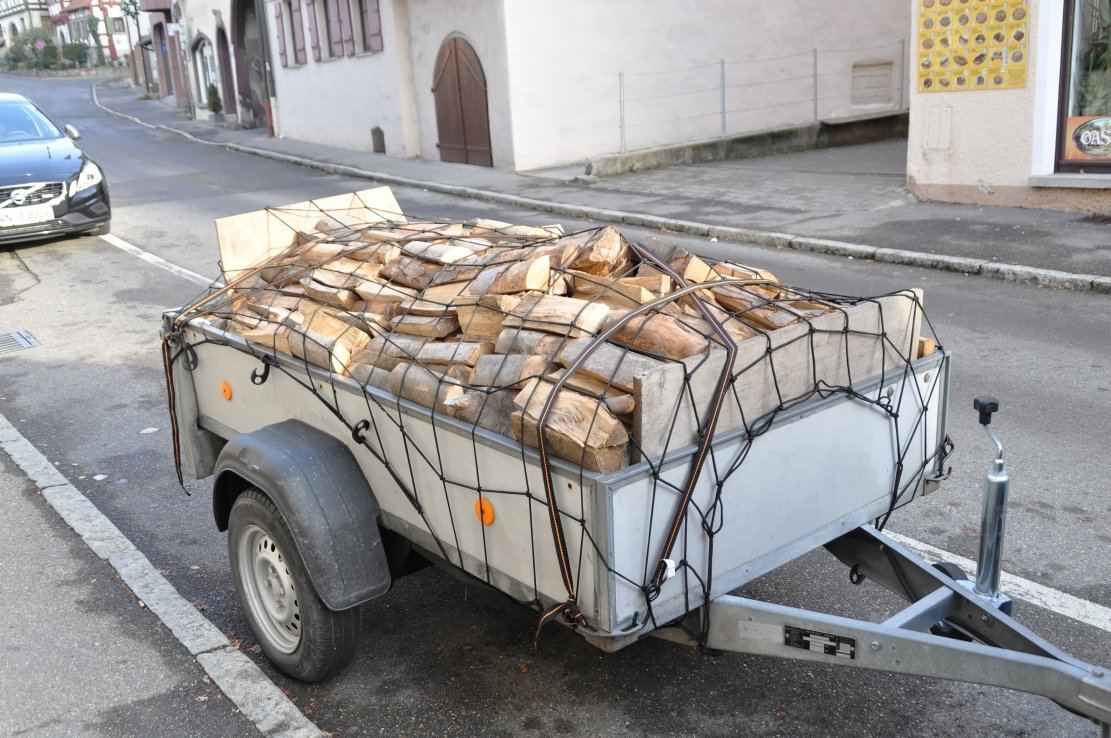
Westfalia trailer

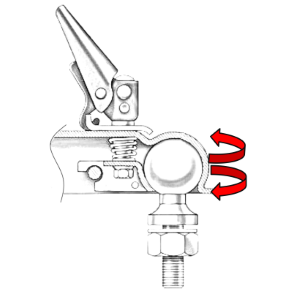
Operation of tow hitch ball with trailer hitch mounted, like the one Franz Knöbel invention patented on March 14, 1934

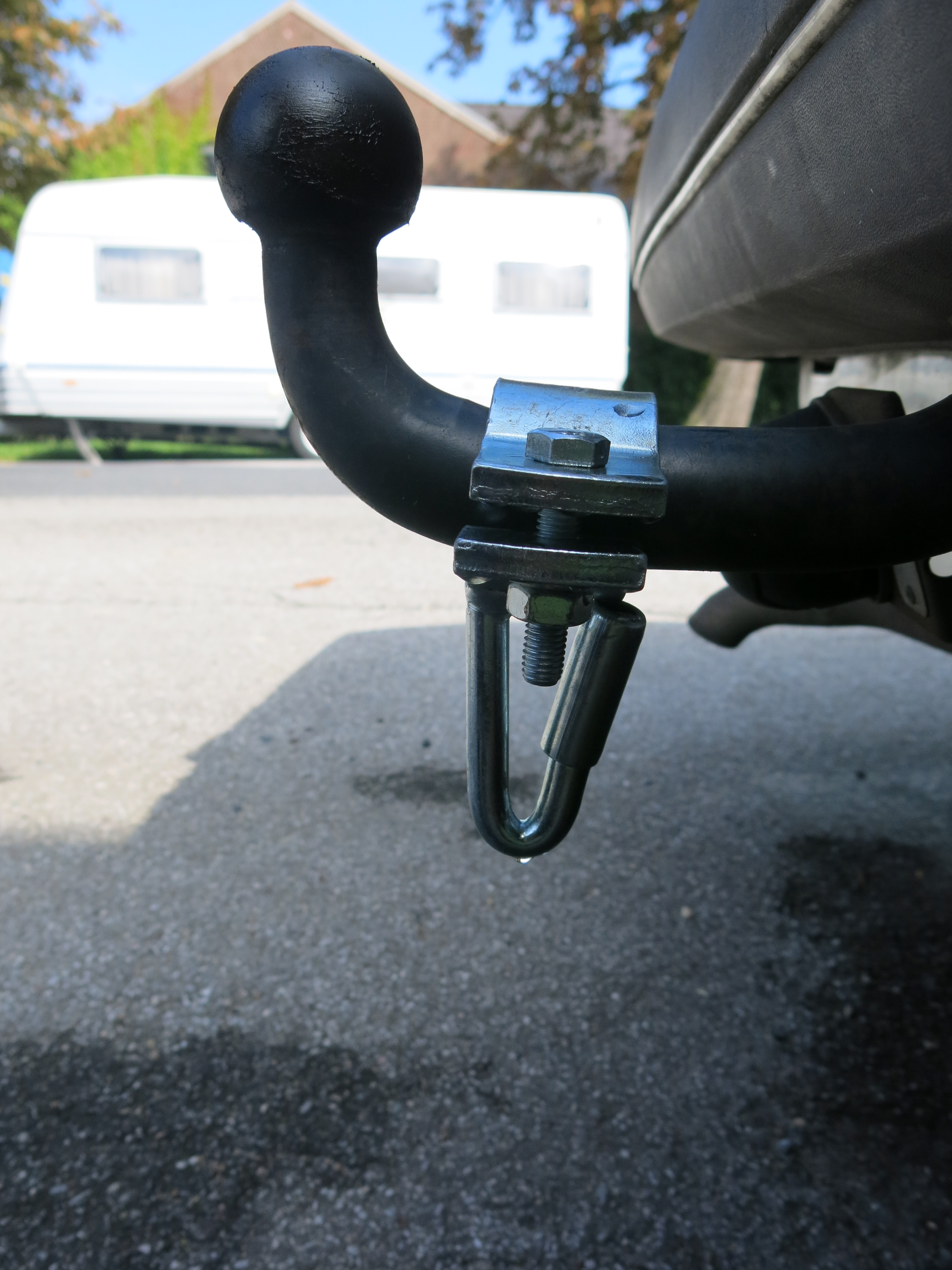
Tow hitch like Franz Knöbel invention

== See also ==
- Bedford Dormobile
- Volkswagen California
- Hymer
