= Volkswagen Type 147 Kleinlieferwagen =

Volkswagen Type 147
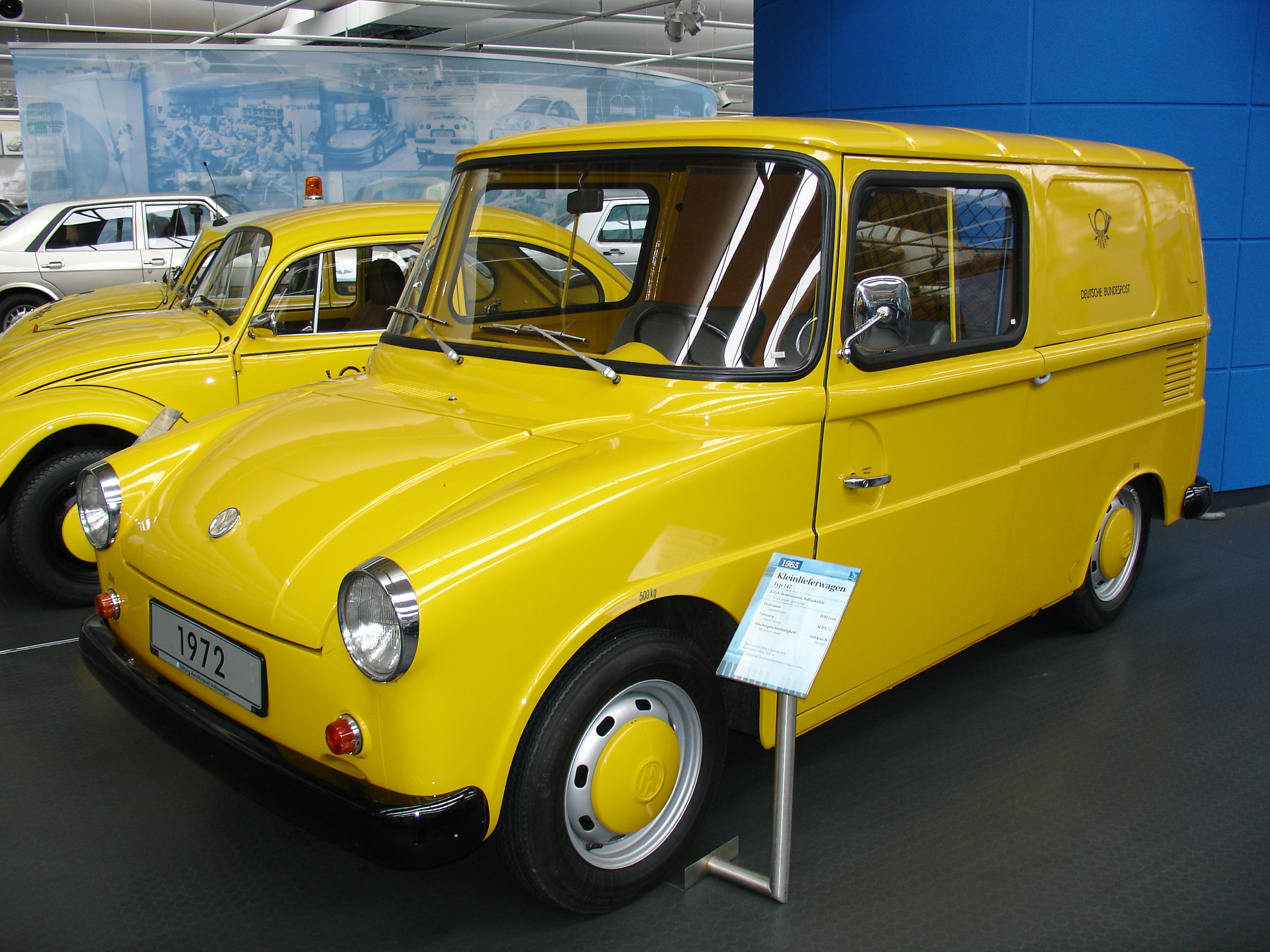
- 1972 Bundespost design

Overview
- Manufacturer: Volkswagen Commercial Vehicles
- Also called: "Fridolin"
- Production: 1964–1974; 6,139 built
- Assembly: West Germany: Wiedenbrück (by Westfalia)

Body and chassis
- Class: Panel van
- Body style: 2-door panel van
- Layout: RR layout

Powertrain
- Engine: Air-cooled 1.2 L H4; 1.3 L H4
- Transmission: 4-speed manual transaxle

Chronology
- Successor: Volkswagen Caddy (1980)

The Volkswagen Type 147 (informally Fridolin) was a panel van produced by the German automaker Volkswagen Commercial Vehicles from 1964 until 1974. The van was mainly built for the purposes of the state-owned Deutsche Bundespost.

== History ==
In February 1962 the German Postal Services commissioned Volkswagen to design them a postal van that would suit their needs. To lower costs, VW started off with the Karmann produced Beetle cabriolet (Type 15) as basis for the van due to its strength in build but later turned to the Karmann Ghia (Type 14) for basis as it was wider. The engine, the transmission and axles originated from the VW Beetle Type 1, the headlights from the VW 1500, and the tailgate (scaled-down) from the VW Transporter (Type 2).

It was agreed Franz Knobel & Sohn GmbH (later called Westfalia-Werke) would build the vehicles at the behest of VW. Several prototypes were designed until production started in 1964. Most cars were sold to the Deutsche Bundespost, but also to Swiss Post Offices (in an upgraded version with a more powerful 1.3 L engine, disc brakes and a block heater) and to the Lufthansa for apron use.

Its official name was Volkswagen Type 147 Kleinlieferwagen (small van) but due to its funny and badly proportioned shape it was affectionately called Fridolin. From 1964 to July 1974, 6139 were produced, approximately 200 are preserved.

== Specifications ==
- Engine: flat 4, 1192 cc, 25 kW (34 hp)
- Length: 3,970 mm (156.3 in)
- Height: 1,950 mm (76.8 in)
- Wheelbase: 2,400 mm (94.5 in)

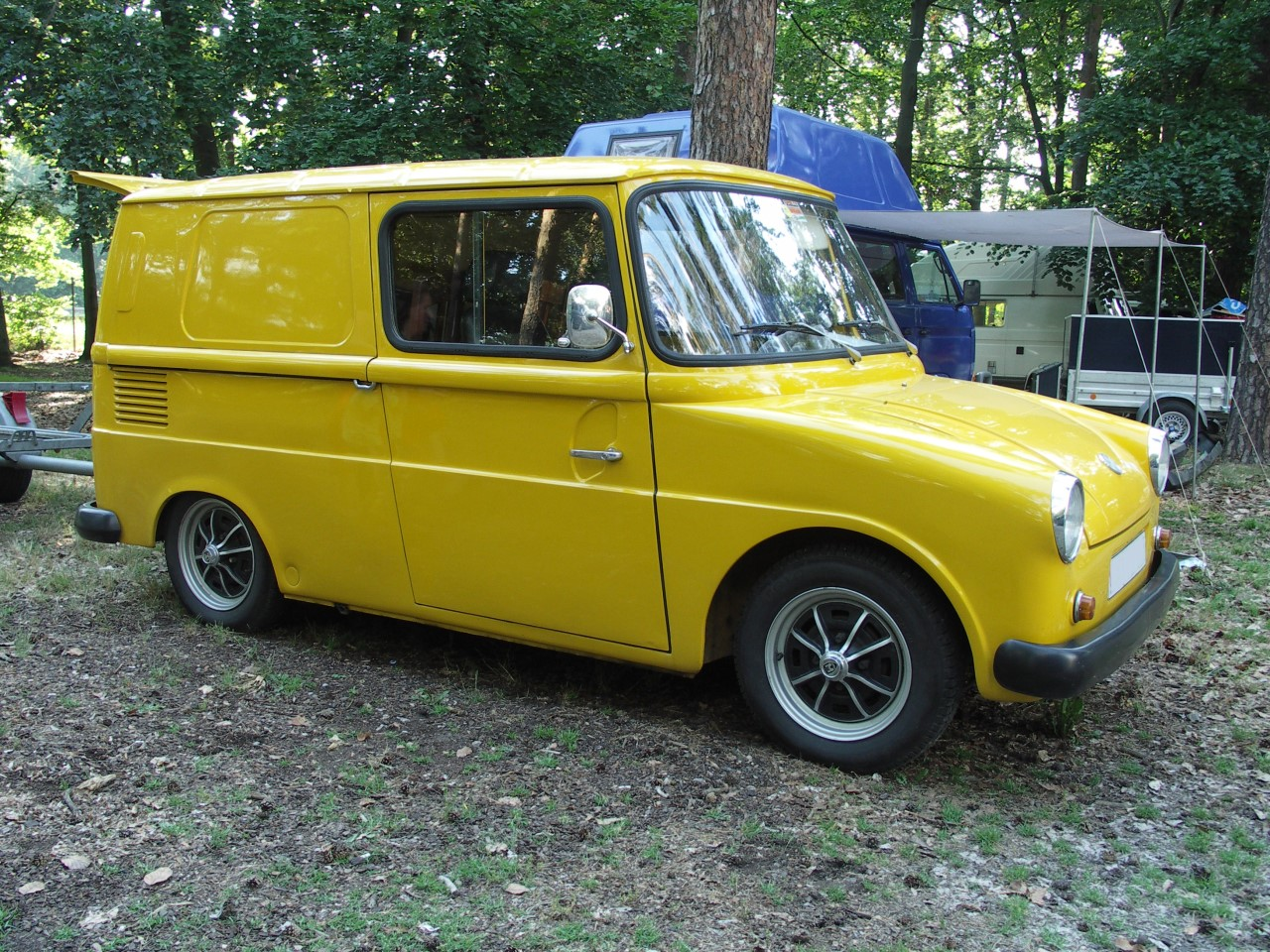
VW Type 147
