= Châtillon-sur-Colmont =

- Commune
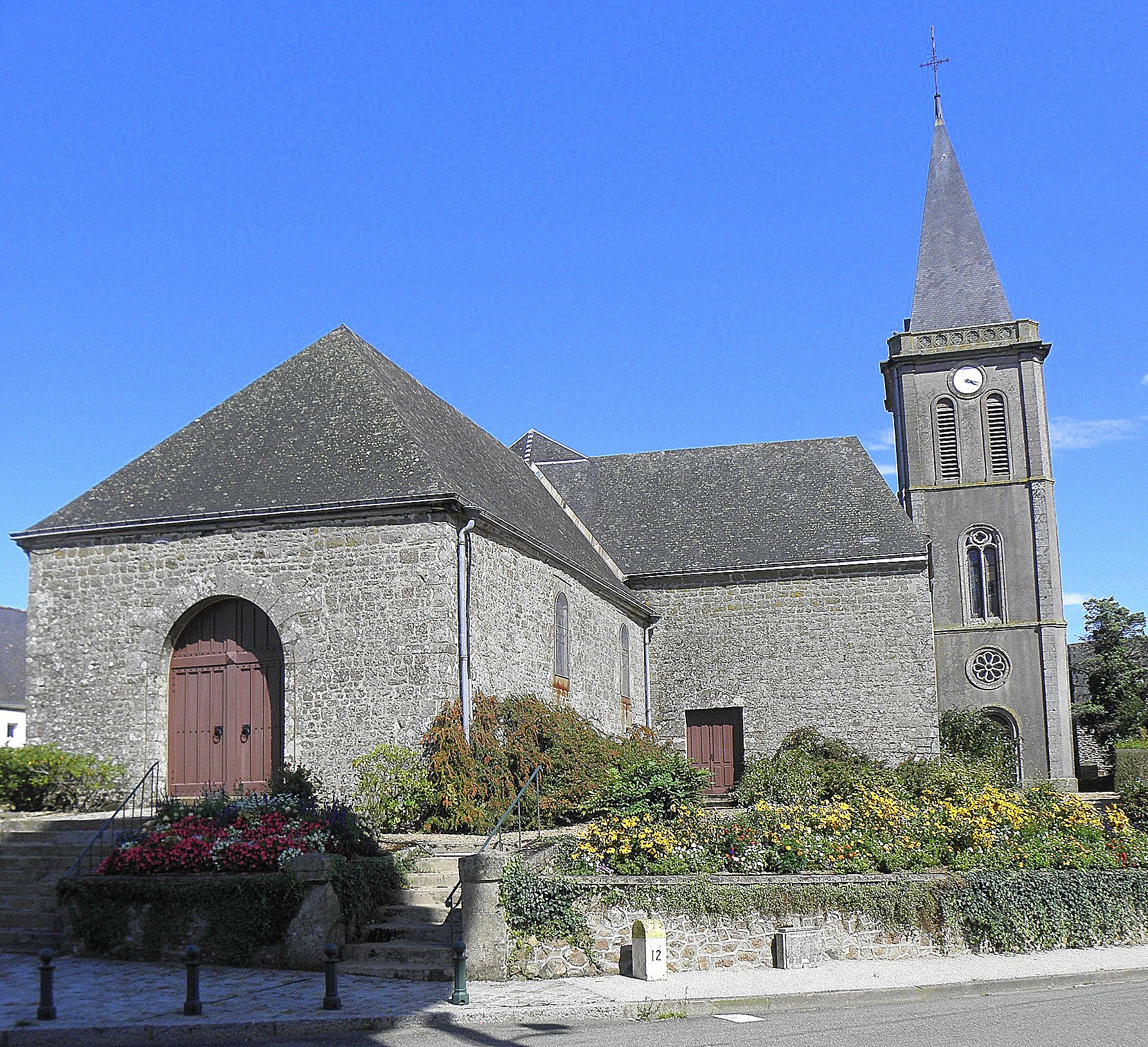
- The church in Châtillon-sur-Colmont

- Coat of arms
- Location of Châtillon-sur-Colmont
- Location within France Location within Pays de la Loire
- Coordinates: 48°20′22″N 0°44′27″W
- Country: France
- Region: Pays de la Loire
- Department: Mayenne
- Arrondissement: Mayenne
- Canton: Gorron

Government
  - Mayor (2020–2026): Prosper Chauvin
- Area^{1}: 39.62 km^{2} (15.30 sq mi)
- Elevation: 225 m (738 ft)
- Highest elevation: 231 m (758 ft)
- Lowest elevation: 110 m (360 ft)
- Population (2023): 949
  - Density: 24.0/km^{2} (62.0/sq mi)
- Time zone: UTC+01:00 (CET)
  - Summer (DST): UTC+02:00 (CEST)
- INSEE/Postal code: 53064 /53100
- ^{1} French Land Register data, which excludes lakes, ponds, glaciers > 1 km^{2} (0.386 sq mi or 247 acres) and river estuaries.

Châtillon-sur-Colmont (French pronunciation: [ʃatijɔ̃ syʁ kɔlmɔ̃], literally Châtillon on Colmont) is a commune in the Mayenne department in north-western France. The river Colmont flows through the commune.

== See also ==
- Communes of the Mayenne department
