= Fridolin Arnault House =

Historic house in New Jersey, US

- U.S. National Register of Historic Places
- New Jersey Register of Historic Places
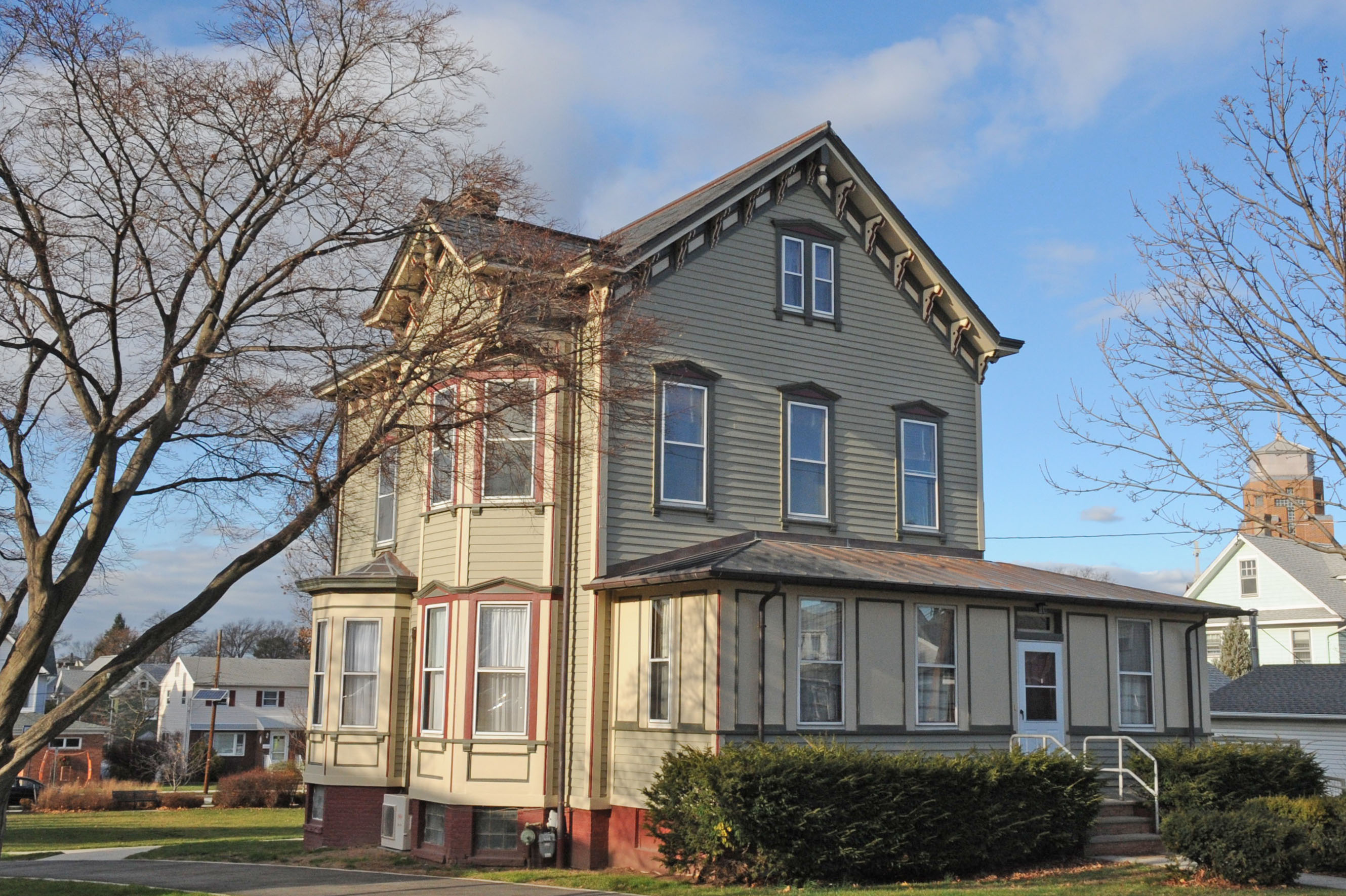

- Location within Bergen County, New Jersey Location within New Jersey Location within the United States
- Location: 111 First Street, Wood-Ridge, New Jersey
- Coordinates: 40°50′44″N 74°5′12.96″W
- NRHP reference No.: 09001153
- NJRHP No.: 3964

Significant dates
- Added to NRHP: December 23, 2009
- Designated NJRHP: September 10, 2009

The Fridolin Arnault House is located in Wood-Ridge, Bergen County, New Jersey, United States. The house was added to the National Register of Historic Places on December 23, 2009. The Wood-Ridge Historical Society is headquartered in this house.

== See also ==
- National Register of Historic Places listings in Bergen County, New Jersey
