= Porsche B32 =

Minibus

Porsche B32 was a minibus from Porsche. It was based on the Volkswagen T3 but fitted with Porsche brakes and suspension. Power came from the 3,2 litre flat-6 from the 911 Carrera. It did 0–100 km/h in 8 seconds and had an official top speed of 185 km/h (115 mph).
