= Adventurewagen =

Camper conversion for Volkswagen Type 2 buses

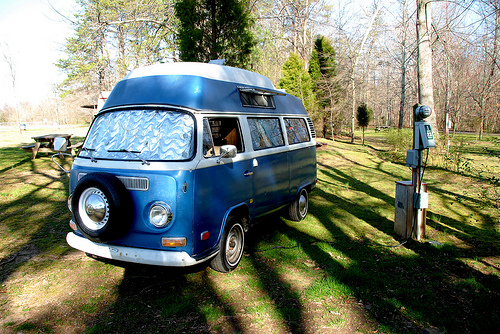
Adventurewagen - Adventurer V Model

Adventurewagens are a type of camper conversion performed on Volkswagen Type 2 buses by Adventure Campers of California. The company was later renamed Adventurewagen. The Adventurewagen company was based out of Fort Bragg, California, on the Mendocino coast. Ed Anderson started doing these conversions on the later VW Type 2 platform (“Bay Window” bus) and later the Vanagon (T3) platform. When Volkswagen discontinued the Vanagon in North America in 1991, Adventurewagen conversions were done on Ford Econoline vans for a time.

The Adventurewagen Vanagon conversions were very high quality, envisioned as an alternative to, and improvement over, the Westfalia campers that were sold by Volkswagen. Adventurewagens came with a thermostatically controlled furnace, 3-way fridge that was larger than Westfalia’s, a water filtration system, insulated high roof with over-cab storage, sleeping for 4 and everything finished in the consumer’s choice of hardwood options (walnut, teak, etc.). The driver and passenger seats could be swiveled around to face the living area, a feature shared with some Westfalia camper models.

The design of the fiberglass roof with its “tail” was thought to be more aerodynamically stable at high speed and in resisting cross-winds. This was marketed by Adventurewagen as an advantage over the Westfalia’s box-like form.
