= Volkswagen Westfalia Camper =

Conversion of Volkswagen Type 2

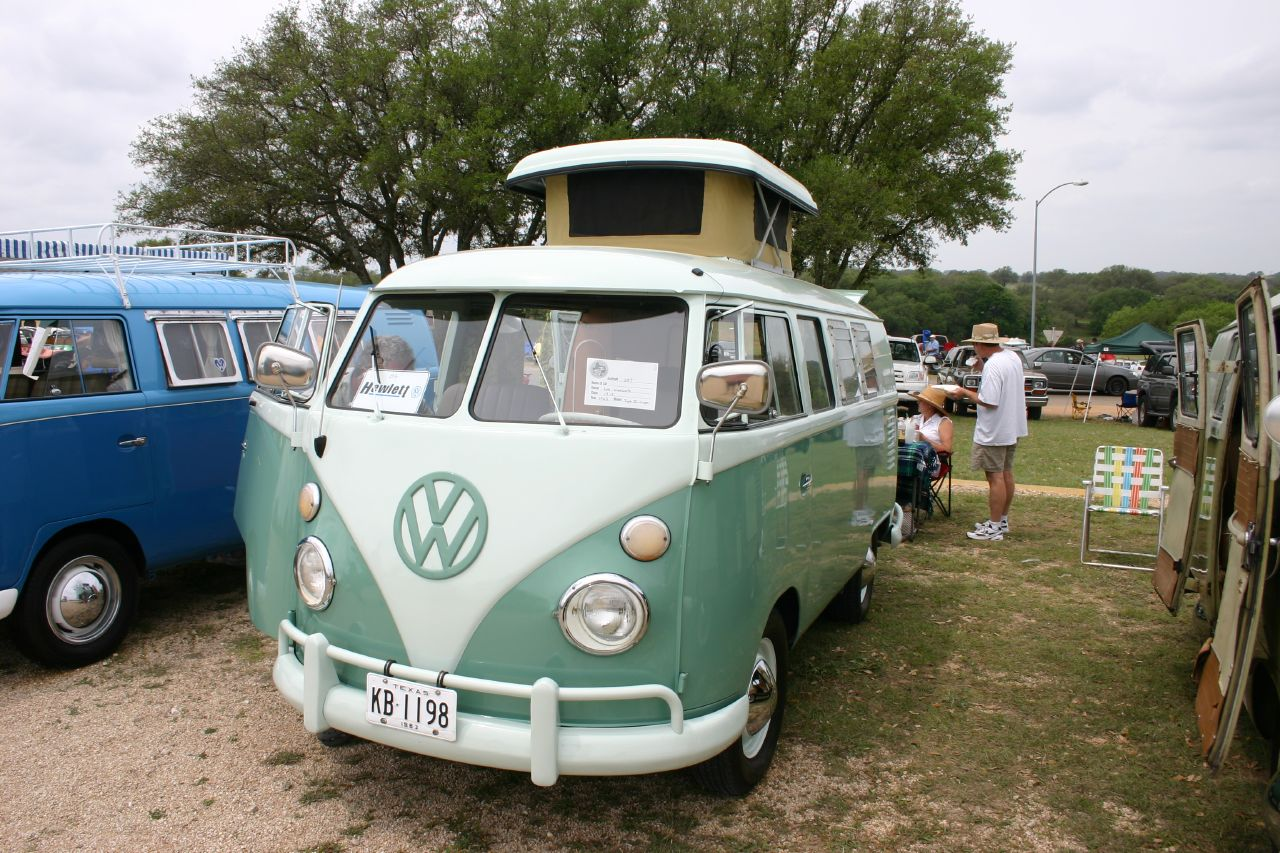
Split-windshield VW Camper

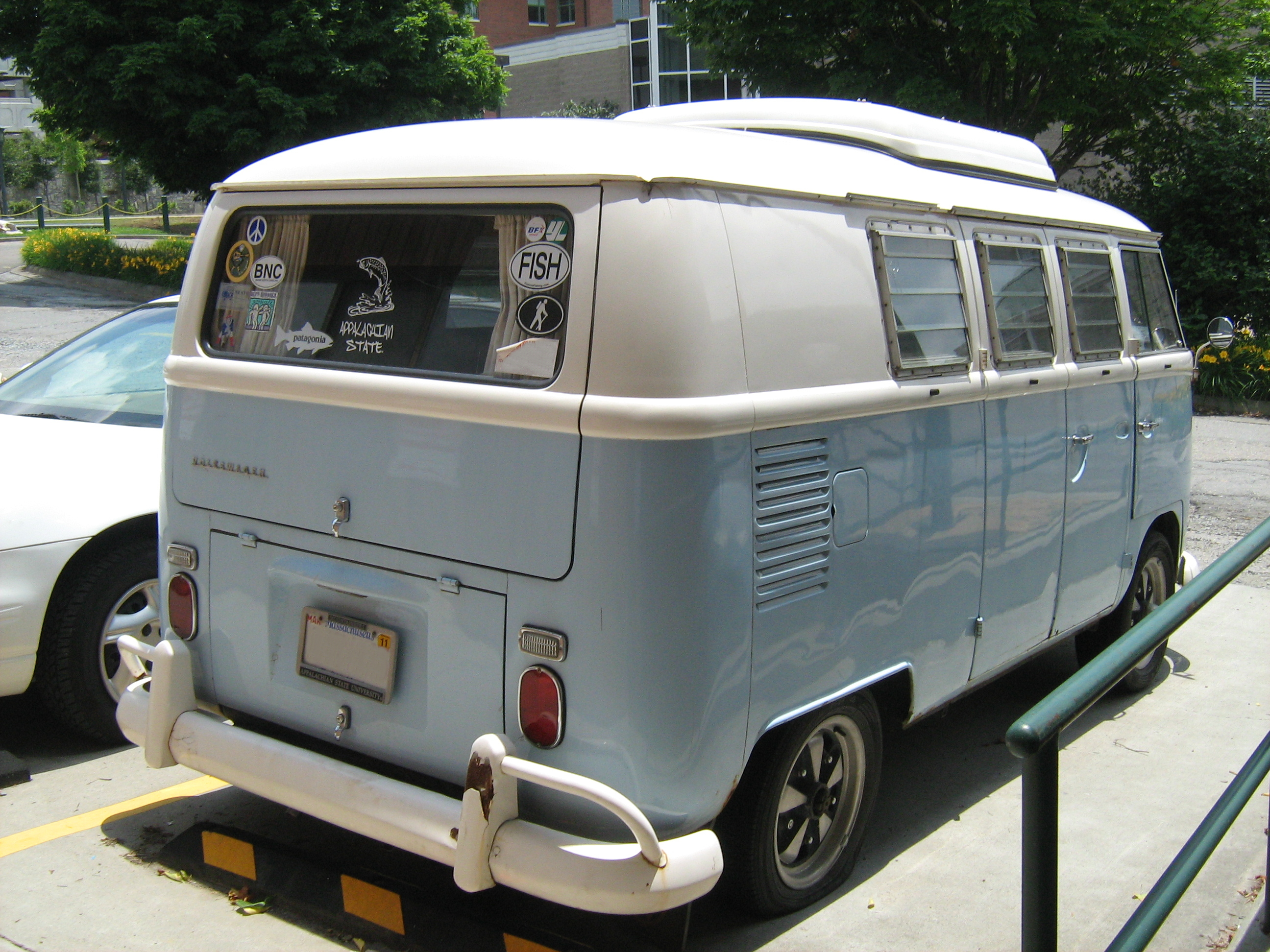
Split-windshield VW Camper

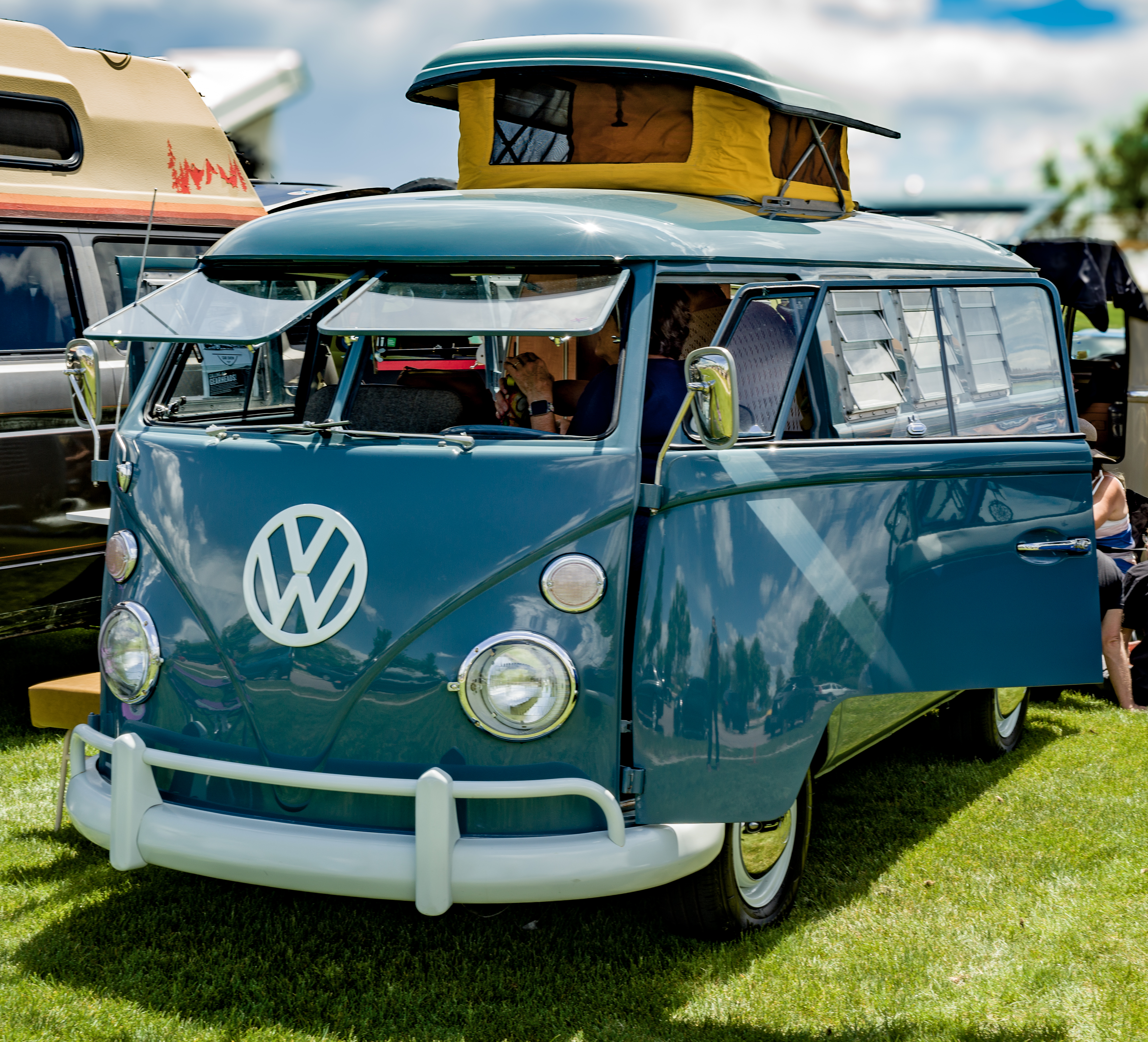
1966 VW Camper with early small pop top and camper jalousie windows.

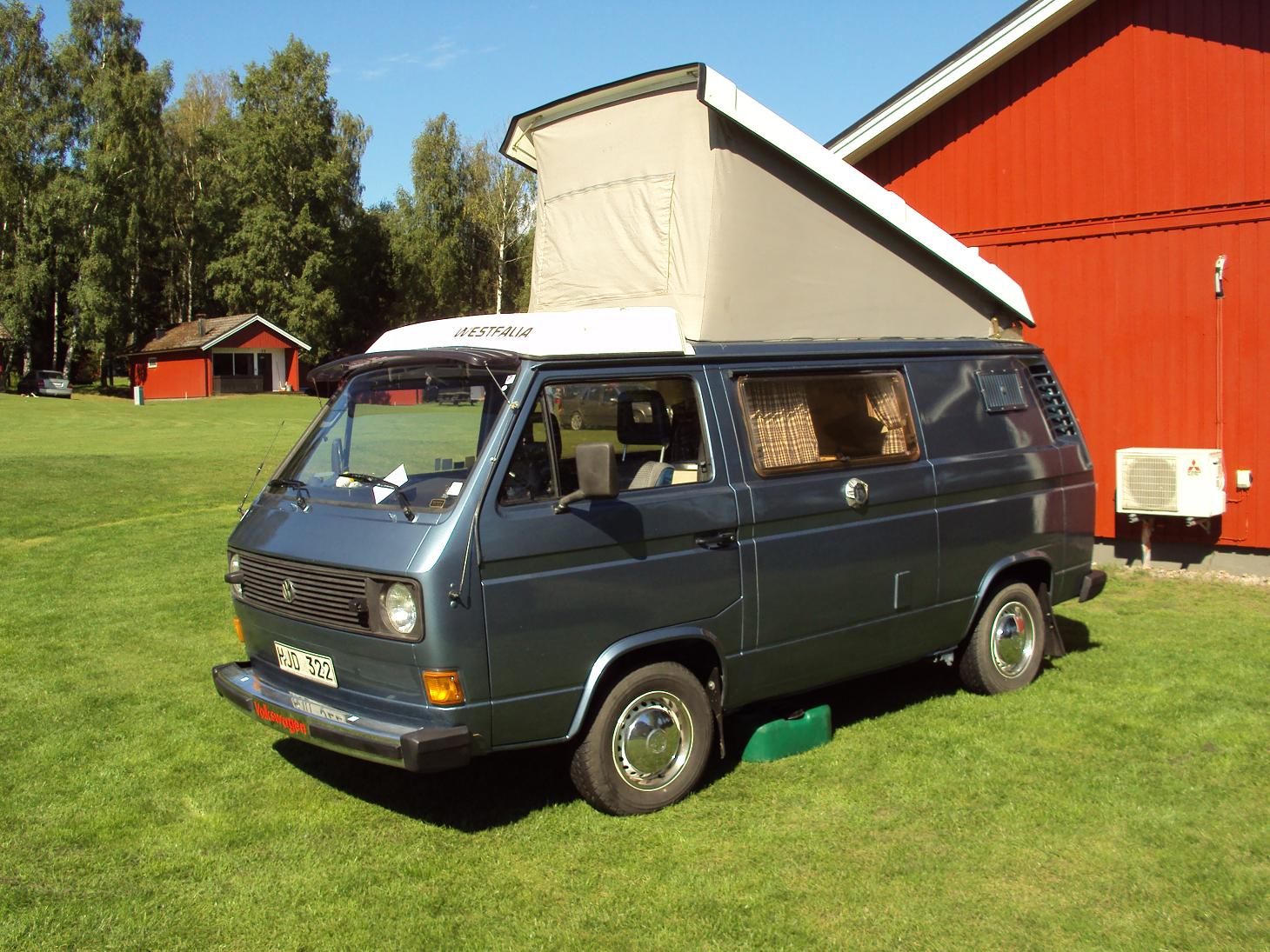
Volkswagen T3 Westfalia Camper

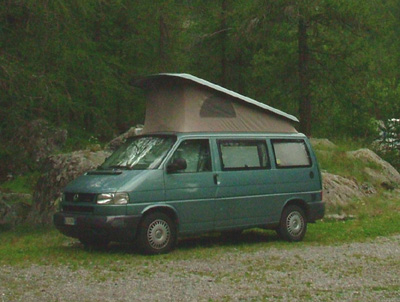
2000 VW Camper

The Volkswagen Westfalia Camper was a conversion of the Volkswagen Type 2, and then, the Volkswagen Type 2 (T3), sold from the early 1950s to 2003. Volkswagen subcontracted the modifications to the company Westfalia-Werke in Rheda-Wiedenbrück.

== Types ==
Early Volkswagen split-windshield Kombis were built between 1950 and 1967. Production of Volkswagen camper variants continued until 2003 and was based on the Kombi, then the Vanagon, then the LT Mk 1, then the Transporter. Other coachbuilders, including Dormobile, EZ Camper, ASI/Riviera, Holdsworth, Danbury Motorcaravans, and VW Sun-Dial, also built campers based on the Transporter.

== Models ==
Between 1951 and August 1958, approximately 1,000 Camper Box conversions were made by Westfalia, the official builder of Volkswagen camper conversions. In August 1958, the SO (German: Sonderausführung, German for "special model") models were introduced.

Westfalia special models included the SO-23, -33 -34, -35, -42, -44, and -45.

Westfalia Campers were available from Volkswagen dealers worldwide and were also delivered via the Tourist Delivery Program — whereby a customer would pick up their new van in Germany, drive it in Europe, and then VW would ship it to the customer's home. Many Volkswagen Campers were purchased by American servicemen and sent home in the 1950s and 1960s.

From 1979 until 1992, the Westfalia Vanagon was built, also called the Volkswagen Campmobile.

== Standard equipment ==
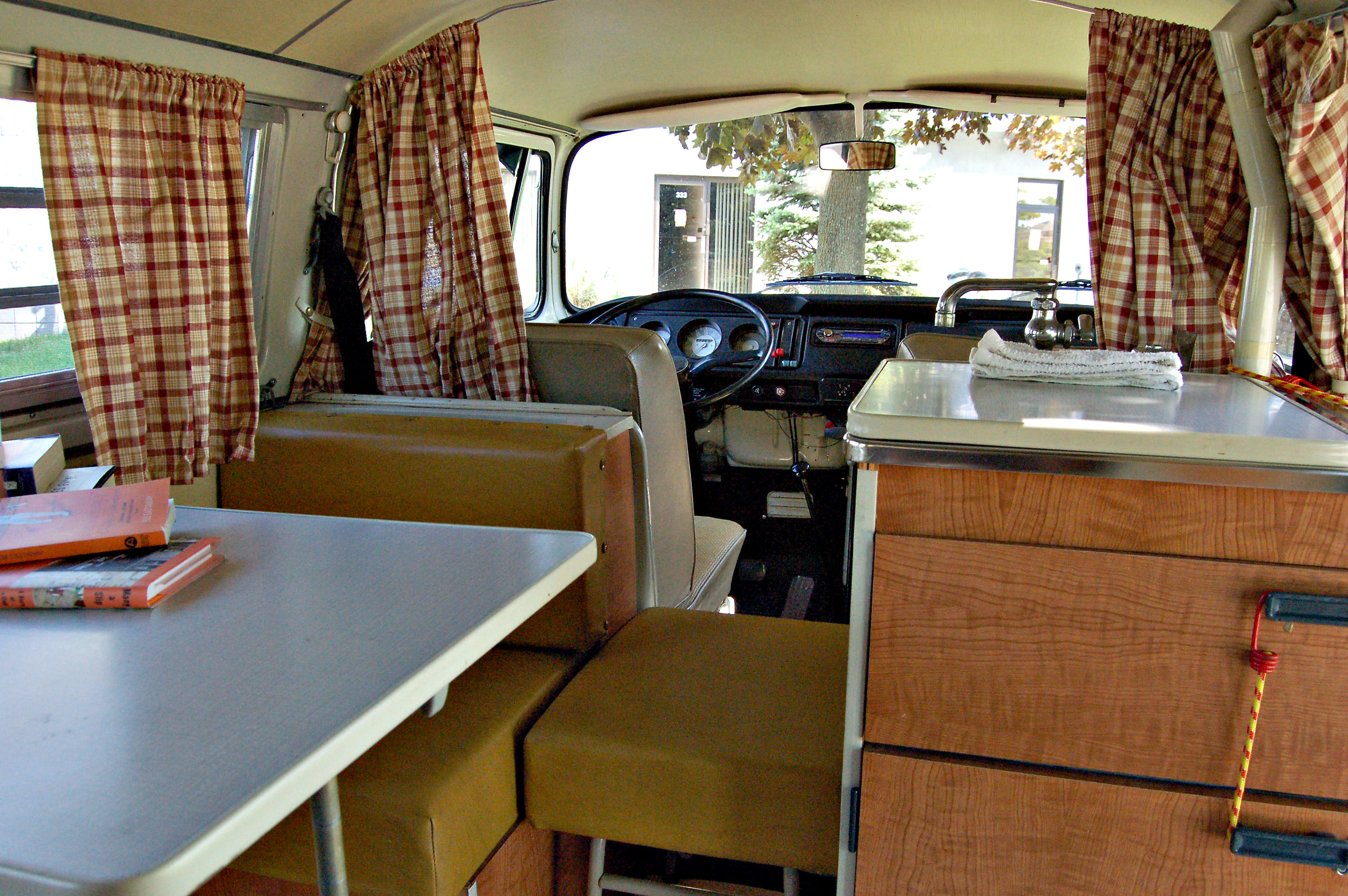
1970 Camper interior

- Various foldout seat arrangements for sleeping
- Birch plywood interior panels
- Laminated plywood cabinetry for storage
- Icebox or cold-box
- Sink (some models)
- Water storage and pump
- Electrical hookups
- Curtains
- Screened jalousie (Venetian blind) windows
- Laminated folding table

== Optional equipment ==
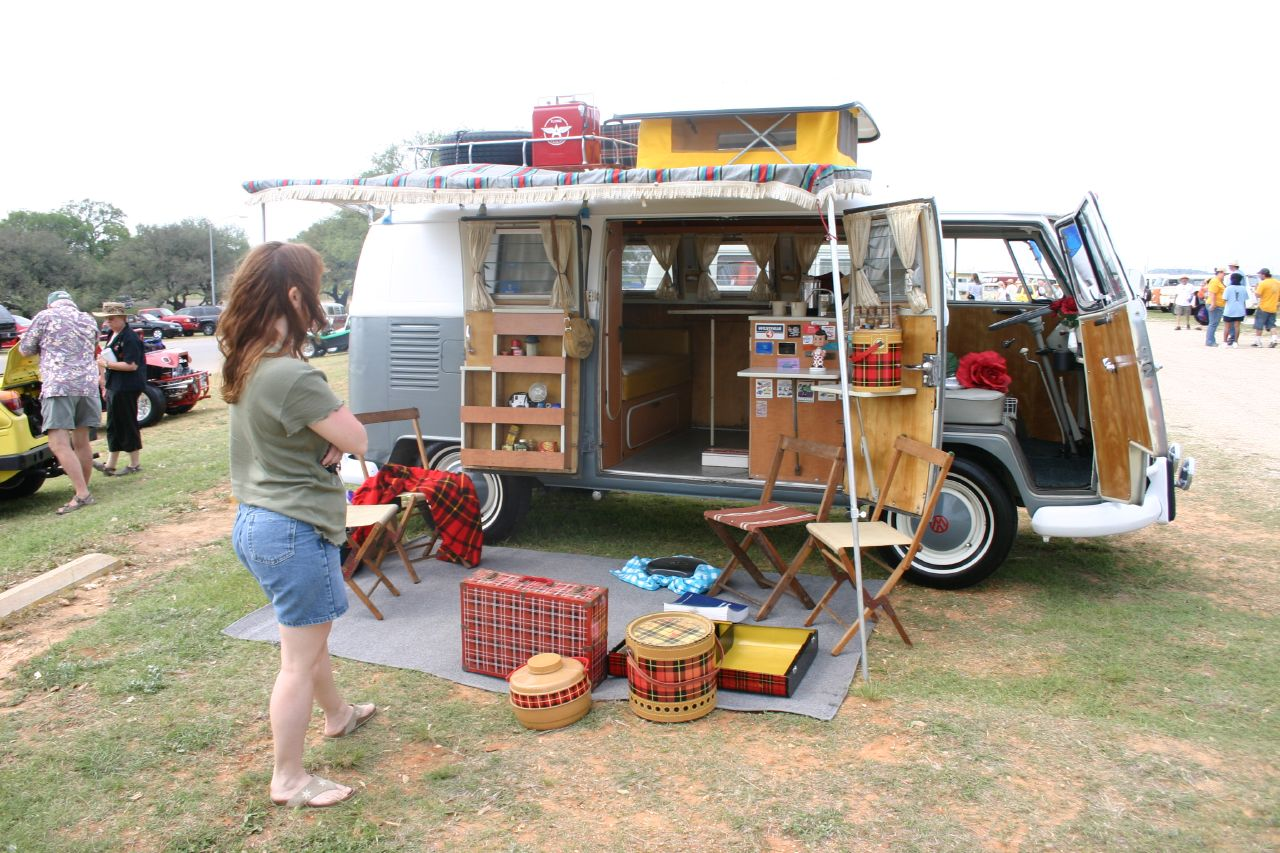
Westfalia split-windshield camper with options

- Attached "pop-up" tops with canvas/screen sides
- Awnings and side tents
- A portable chemical toilet
- A camping stove
- Various camping equipment
- Child sleeping cot in driver's cab
- Storage box that matches interior panels.
- Rear swing table
- Small map table mounted on the dash
- Automatic Transmission (beginning in the 1970s)
- Air conditioning (dealer-installed) (from 1954)

=== Awnings and side tents ===
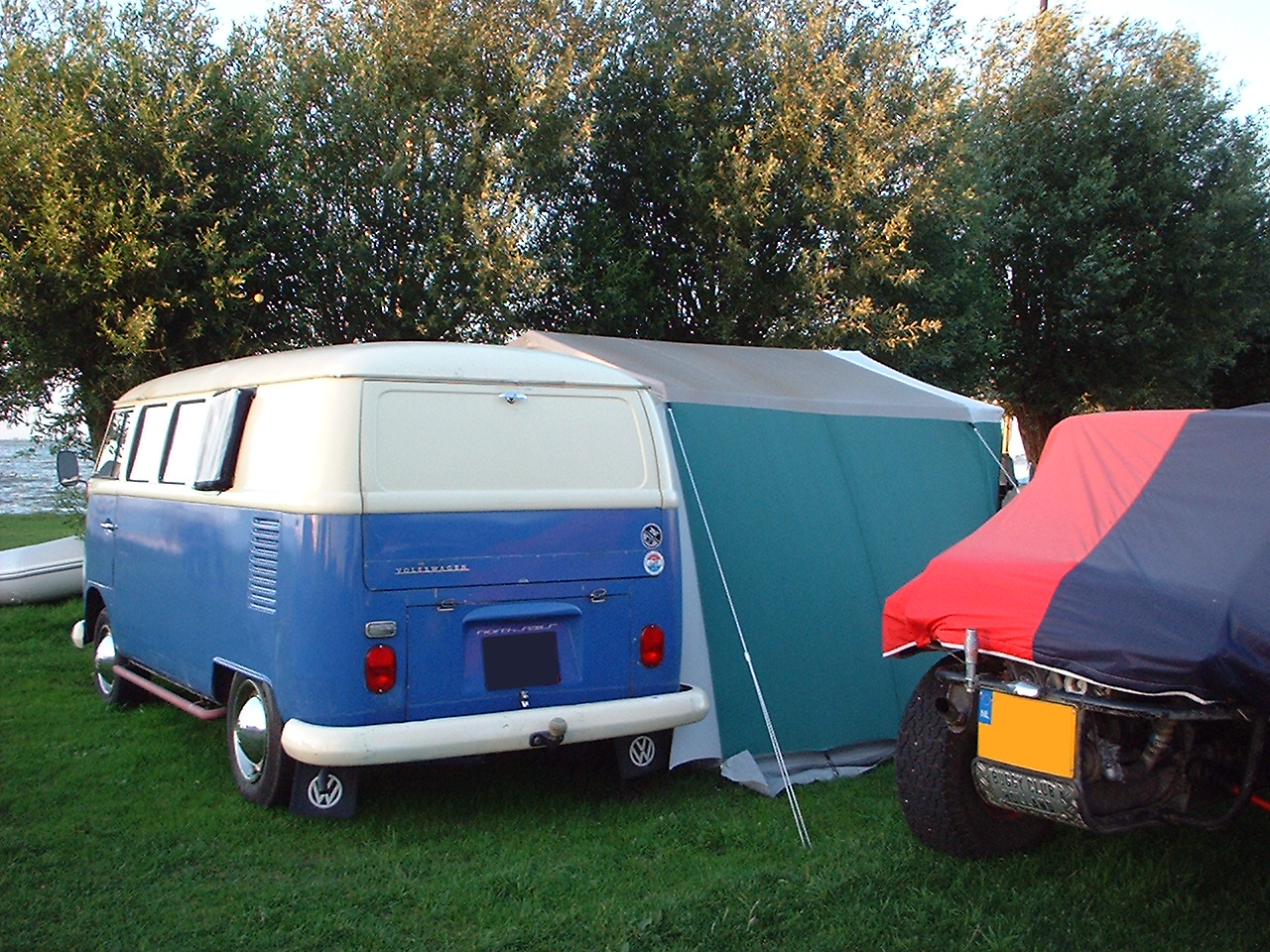
T1 Camper with side tent

Several tent and side awning designs were available as extra-cost additions. Collectors often have difficulty determining whether one of these options was specifically available from and for Westfalia models, or was developed and sold by other camper conversion vendors such as ASI/Riviera and Sundial. ASI built camper tops for the VW Vanagon out of Seattle, WA. They were used on US and Canadian-imported VWs only.

SO-22 "camping box" Period (1952–58). During this period no tent per se was available from Westfalia, but one could obtain a striped canvas awning that stretched almost the length of the vehicle and extended about six feet out to the side. The awning frame seems to be similar to that of the SO-23 period large tent described below. This earliest of Westfalia tents is shown on the cover of the July, 1955 issue of Popular Mechanics and in a 1956 brochure that describes it as "a large, colorful side awning."

SO-23 deluxe camper (1958–1965). Two tent options were available during this period. One was similar to the 1952–1958 awning, with the addition of removable side curtains, and the other was a small vestibule or foyer that only covered the side door area. These had no names other than "large tent" and "small tent," and the larger one seems to have been available with and without a bathroom as described below.

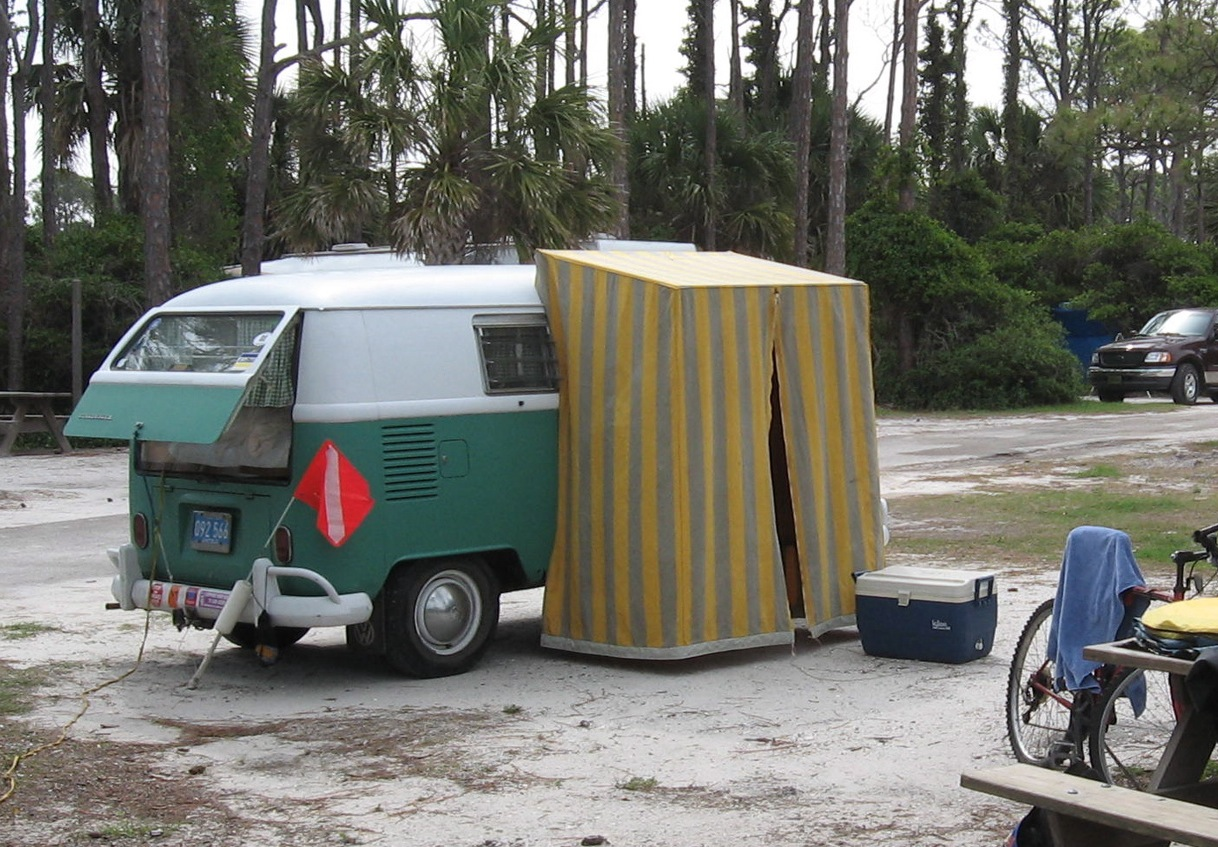
The small tent

The small tent, available in either red/white or blue/gray stripes, was less popular and thus is less often seen today. It consists of a single piece of heavy canvas, with a strip of vinyl along the bottom acting as a reinforcement and splash guard. It fits over the side-door opening (and has a gap for one leg of the roof rack) as a sort of foyer or vestibule. It's big enough for two adults to stand inside, but little else, and was probably intended as a means of getting in and out of the camper in cold or wet weather.

The stripes are about four inches wide. The tent itself is about four feet wide by three feet deep, and the inside headroom is well over six feet. A long white zipper runs up the middle of the front, while the back is open and contoured to fit the bus. The frame consists of four metal poles that fit into pockets inside the top of the tent and lock together to form a square. Legs on two of the poles fit into brackets which were bolted to the camper's roof. Two additional poles dogleg into the top frame and have small chain hooks to hold the doors open. The lower ends of these poles fit into holes in the jack supports. Rubber grommets help protect the paint on the doors and the jack points. The lower edge of the tent is secured to the ground with about a dozen metal stakes. Each stake is about six inches long and is formed from hardened 1/4" rods with a loop at one end. Two storage bags made of (usually matching) canvas with leather straps are supplied for the tent and poles.

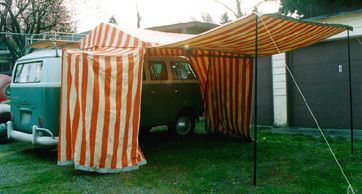
The large tent with optional awning supports

The large tent, probably a revision of the SO-22 awning model, has also been called the "privy tent" because most models seen today have a bathroom in the rear side wall. This is a zippered, metre-square room that sticks out toward the back and is held up by telescoping poles and guy ropes. Open grommets are placed near the top for ventilation.

This tent is most often seen in a yellow/blue-grey stripe but was also available in red/white, orange/blue, orange/white, and green/white. The tent's frame mounts to brackets on the roof and bumpers. The front bumper mount is a flat plate of steel bent into an open S or Z shape. Tent poles are steel, either black or grey, around 2 cm in diameter, and fourteen sections that must be assembled to create a rectangular, peaked awning with support rods leading to the bumpers. Once the awning has been set up, curtains can be attached to the three outer sides (with Tenax lift-the-dot fasteners) to achieve a weatherproof - though windowless and floorless - portable shelter. Leather straps secure the sidewalls to the support poles, and stakes hold the bottom edges down as with the small tent. An additional set of poles and stakes were available to permit the outer flap to be extended horizontally as a second awning, resulting in a large shaded space on the side of the bus.

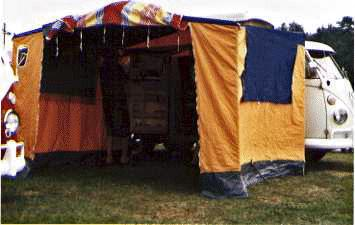
The framed tent

The framed tent (1965–1967). This is the largest and most colorful of the Westfalia side tents. It's different from the earlier small and large awning-based tents in two important ways: the addition of large, screened windows on the side curtains, and a free-standing frame that allows the tent to be left at the campsite while the bus is driven away for groceries or side trips. The tent also has a rear door that can be zipped closed at such times. Both front and rear flaps can be rolled up and held open by cloth ties or (on later models) straps with lift-the-dot fasteners.

This is the final Westfalia tent produced for the Split-windshield bus and is arguably the most collectible version; its tents alone, in good condition, have been sold for well over US$1,000.

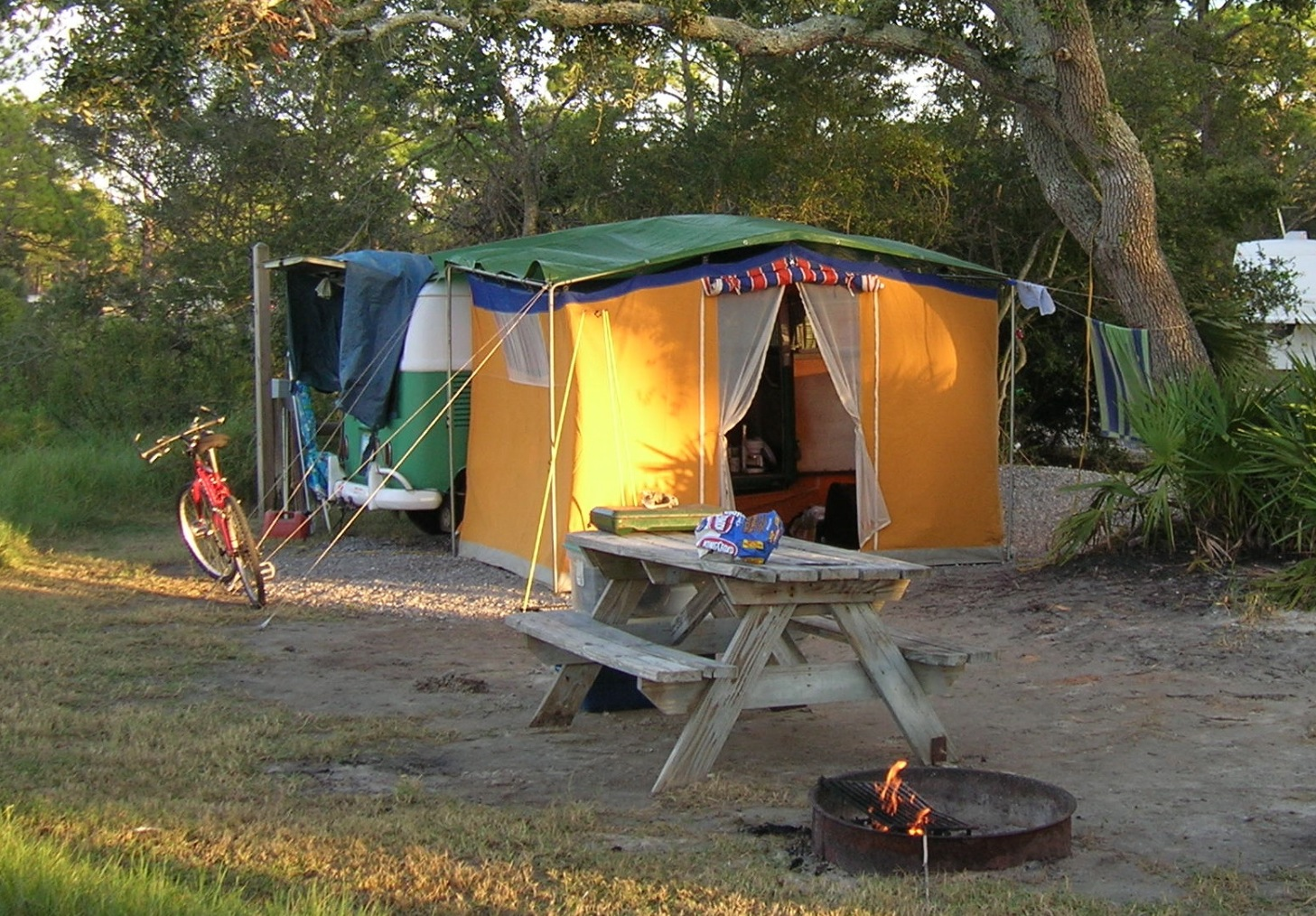
Freestanding Model (1968 and later buses)

Early bay-window tent. When Volkswagen transitioned to the bay window or bread loaf model with a large, single-curved windshield and sliding side door, the Westfalia camper was modified to include an angled pop top. This design provided space for a large child's cot overhead, and on later models, the pop top was further enlarged to fit a full bed large enough for two adults.

The add-on side tent underwent a complete redesign. The new model (referred to in publicity materials as an Add-a-Room tent or a Motent) superficially resembles the late Split-windshield's framed tent in general shape and colors but is otherwise quite different. For one, the tent's frame is now external, with the canvas supported by elastic loops and plastic hooks, somewhat like a shower curtain. Instead of a single opening front panel, there is a zippered screen door in the middle of the front (side away from the bus) with a small awning flap that can be lowered for wind and rain protection. This tent also features a waterproof floor, and the attachment method on the vehicle side results in a securely closable shelter (i.e., no more gap below the bus floor).

Other WV tents: Various websites (see links in References section) provide information about other Westfalia (and otherwise VW-supplied) tents, as well as aftermarket tents supplied by other manufacturers, in the Vanagon and Transporter/Eurovan periods (1980 to present).

== Identification ==
M-codes are used to identify the vehicle factory options. Beginning in 1958, a metal plate was riveted to the back of the right front seat. The plate lists the date of manufacture and various options that were incorporated into the vehicle.

The information included the date of manufacture, the option codes, the export destination, the model number and paint finish (typically a durable finish referred to as Nitro-Lacquer), the paint color codes, and the VIN or serial number.

=== M-Code plate ===
This plate is located behind the front right rear seat on Volkswagen Buses through 1976. In 1977, the location was moved to sit atop the air duct on the left side, just above the fuse panel.

DD M Y DD=Day of Month M=Month (1-12) and Y Was the year between 1958 and 1964
(removed in 1965 and placed in the first digit of the serial number)

XXX XXX XXX XXX M-Codes

XX

Export-Codes

XXX Y

Model-Codes Paint-Type

XX YY ZZ

Lower-Color-Codes
Upper-Color-Codes
Upholstery-Codes

AABCCCCCC

AA=21 for panel van or 23 for Kombi
B=Model Year after 1965
CCCCCC=Serial#

== Options ==
Many factory and aftermarket options exist for these campers. Owners of Camping Vans and many Volkswagen clubs manage websites detailing these vehicles and their accessories.

The Volkswagen Camper has become something of an icon in British and American culture, as a symbol of hippy and surf culture that grew in the mid-to-late 1960s.

== Gallery ==
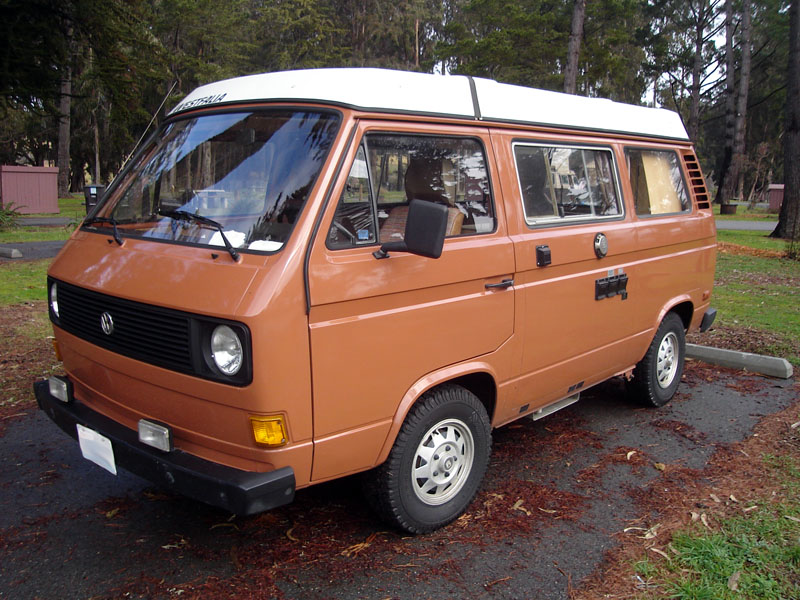
1980 Type 2 T3 Air-cooled Westfalia Camper

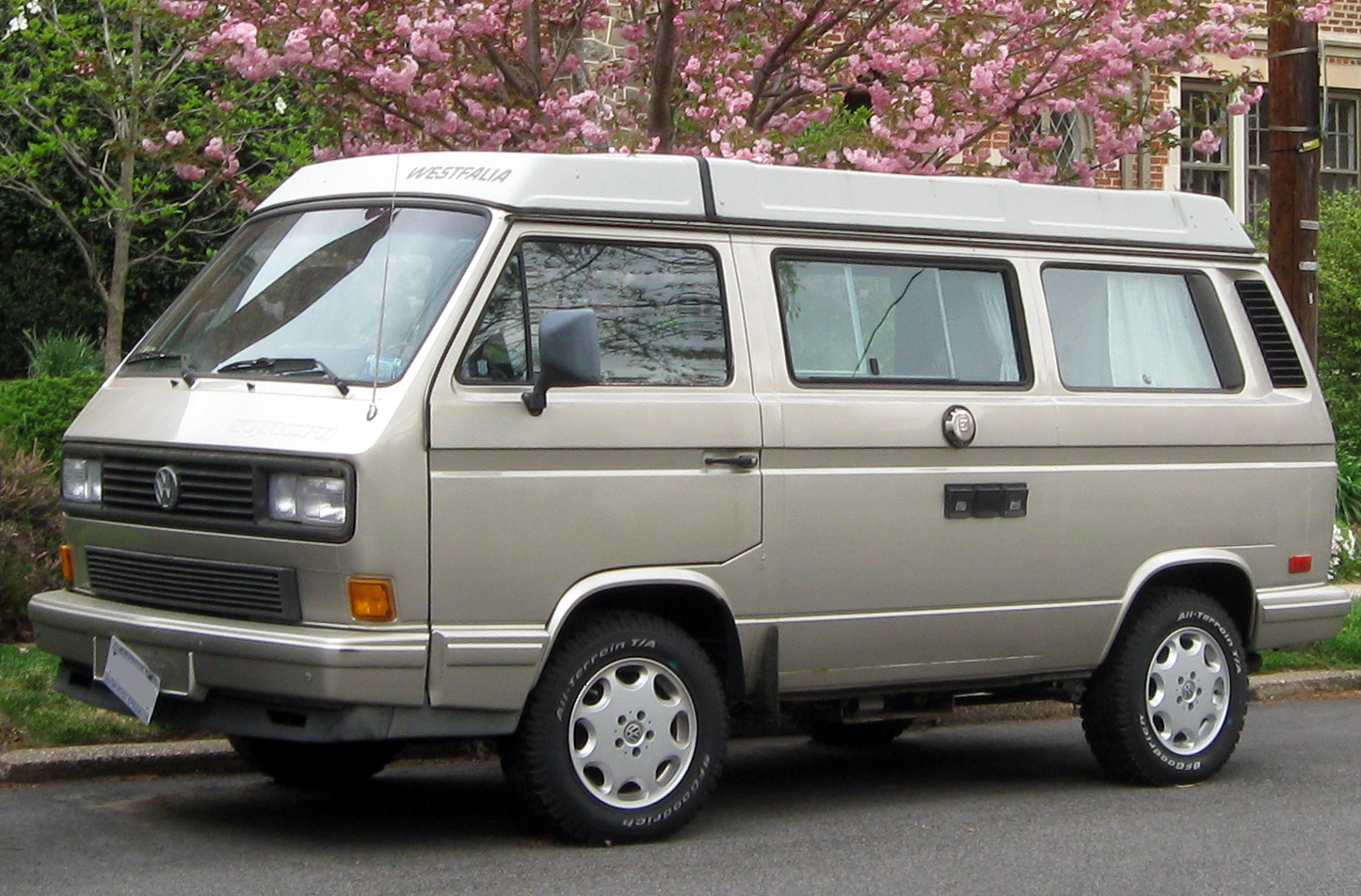
Volkswagen Vanagon Westfalia, water cooled (US)

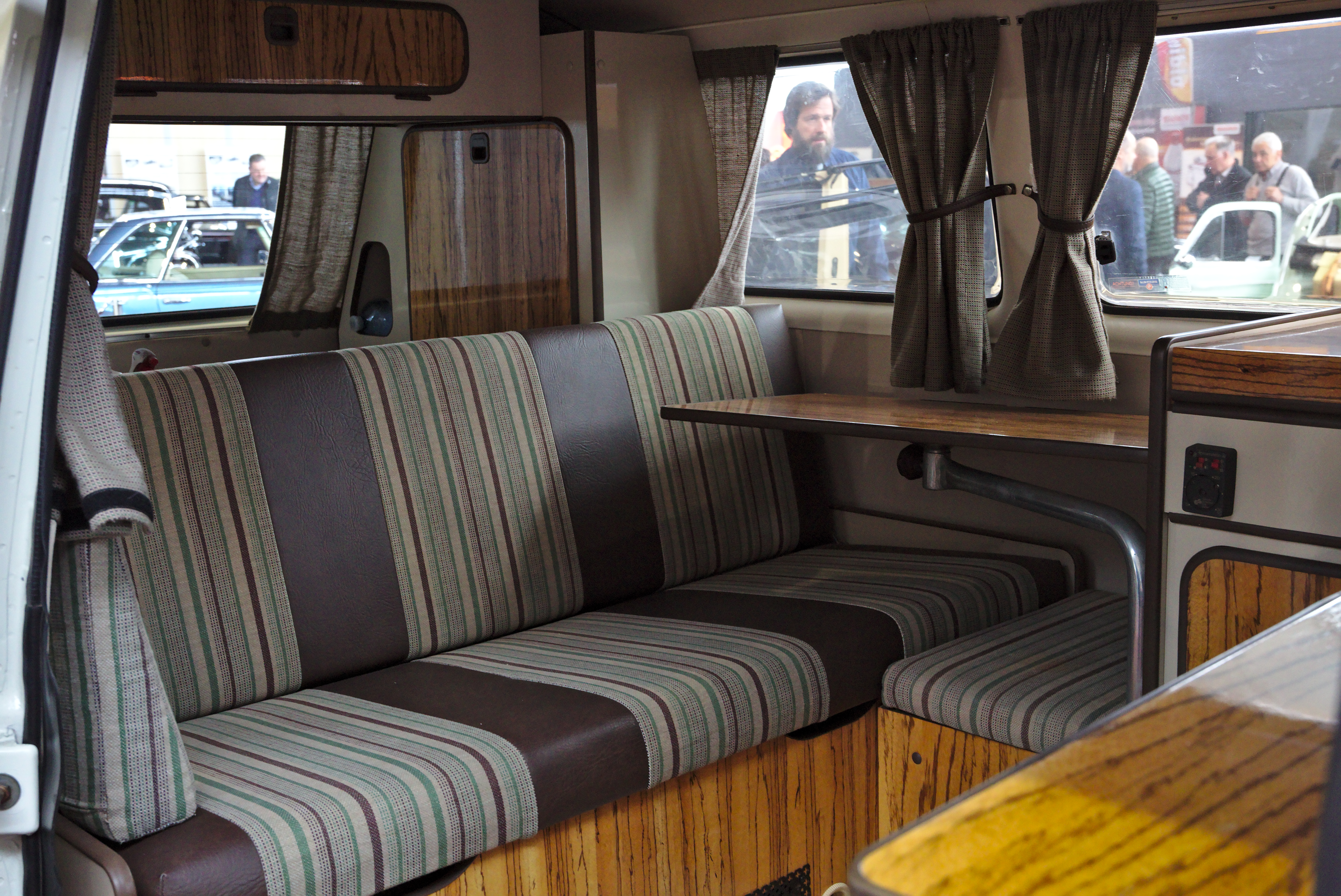
Vanagon inside

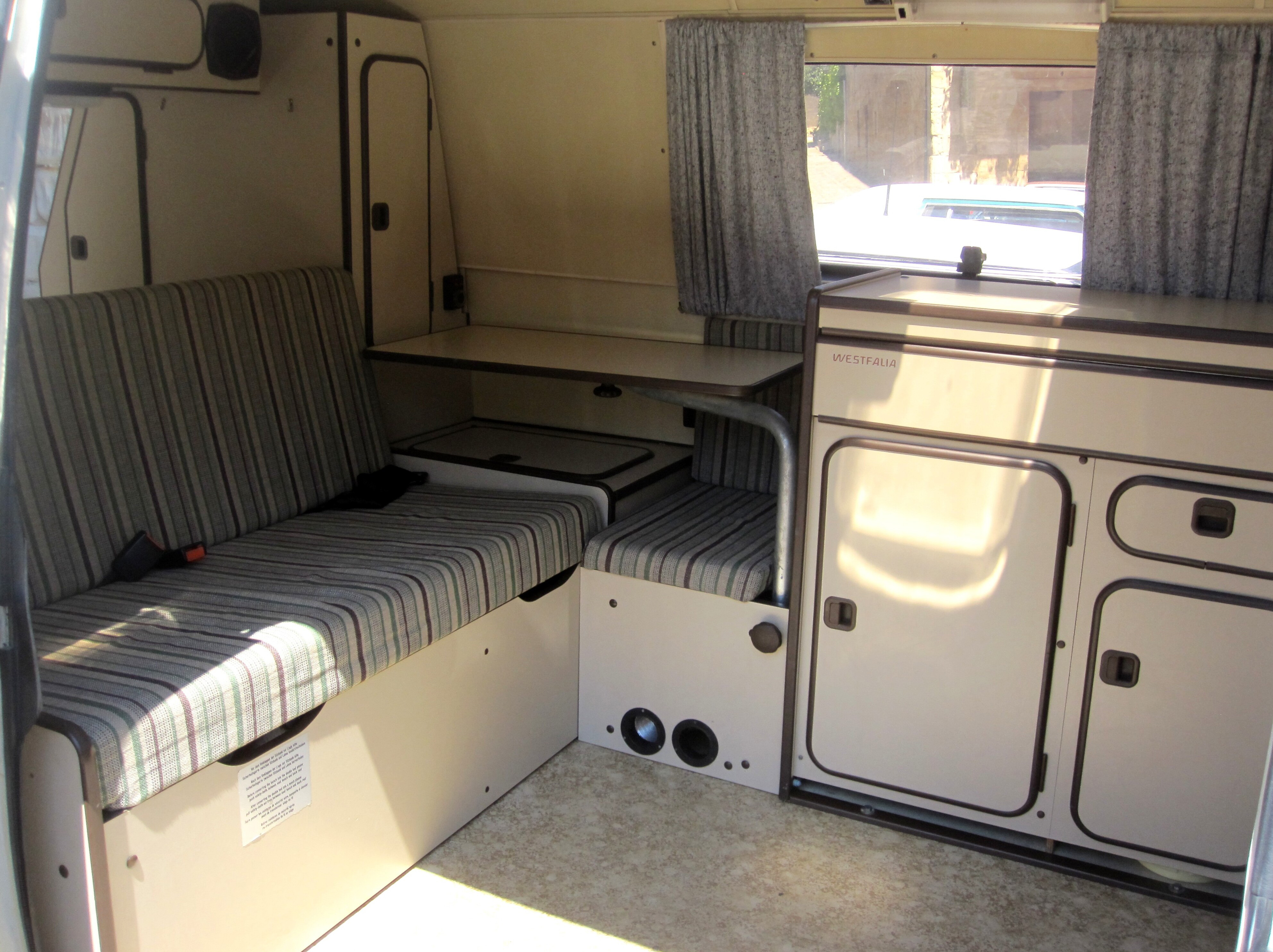
Vanagon inside

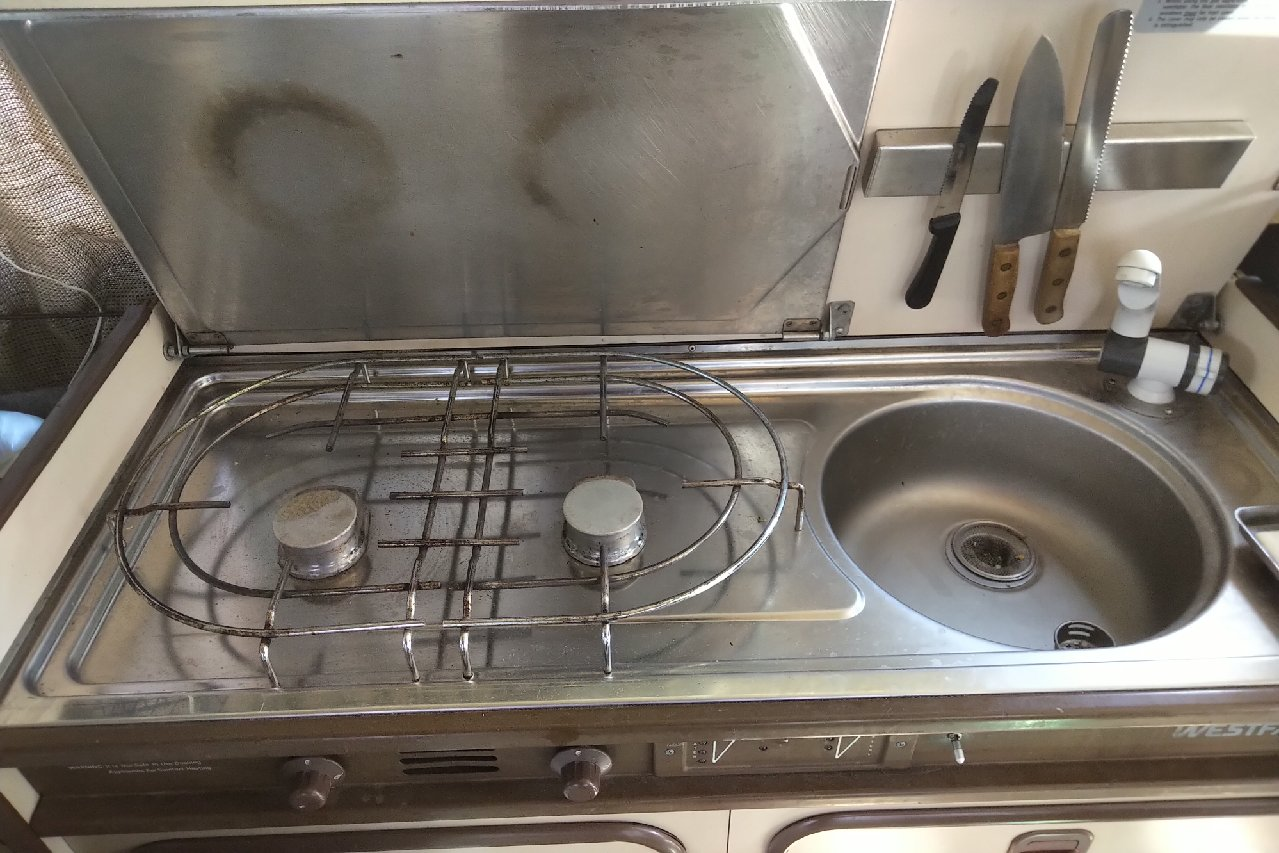
Vanagon Westfalia stove and sink

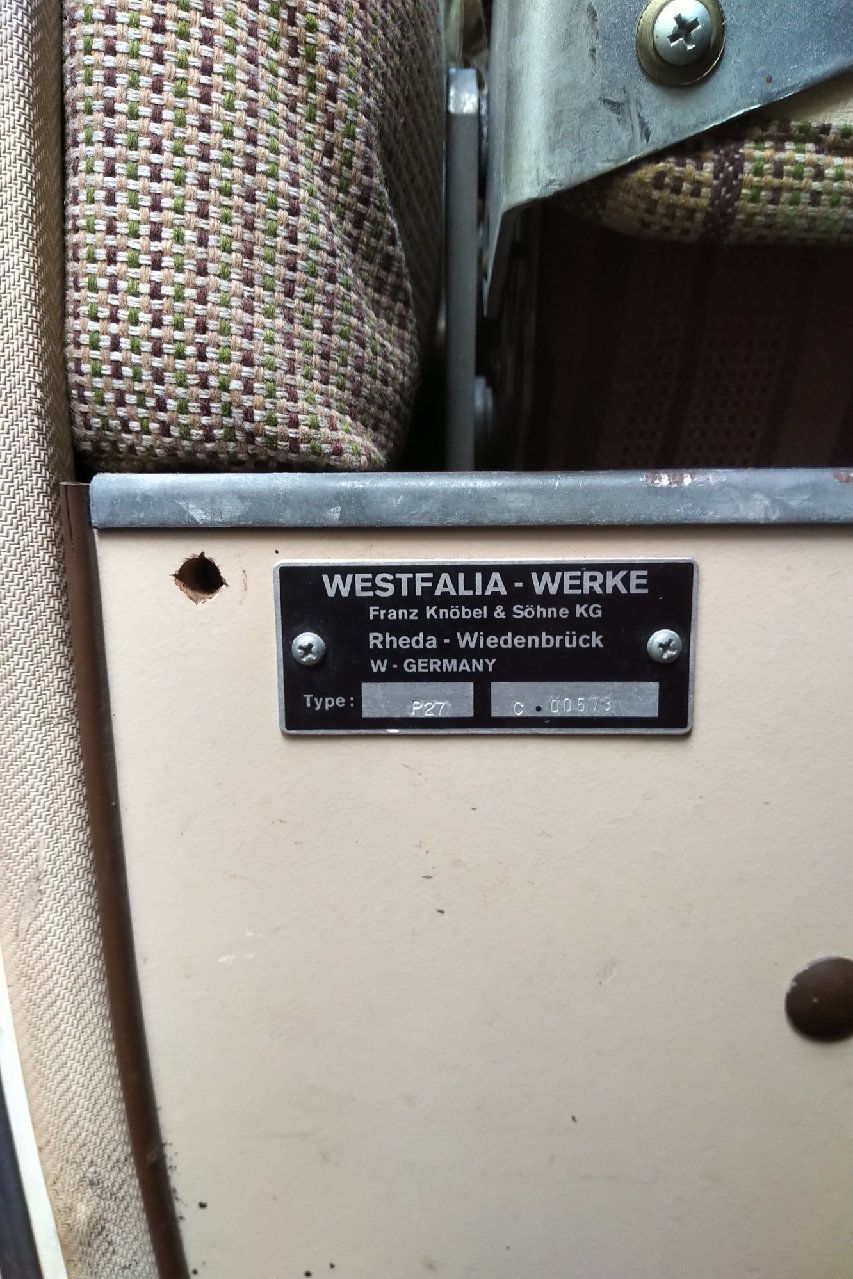
Vanagon Westfalia name plate, used on all Westfalia products

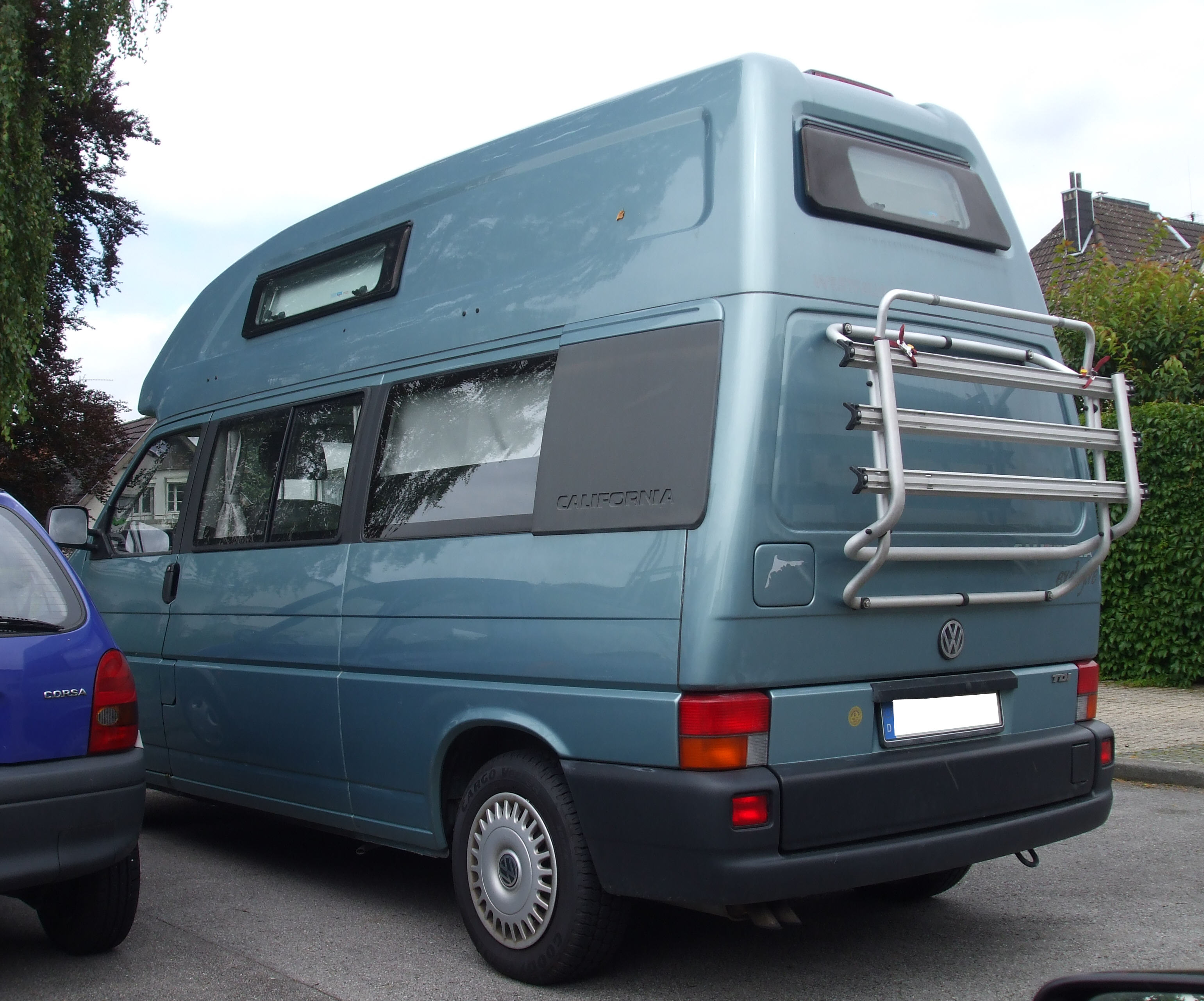
Westfalia California a VW T4 camper

1982 Westfalia VW Vanagon bed and stove

== See also ==
- Adventurewagen
- Bedford Dormobile
- Volkswagen California
