= Volkswagen Type 2 (T3) =

Third generation of the Volkswagen Transporter

Volkswagen Type 25 (T3)
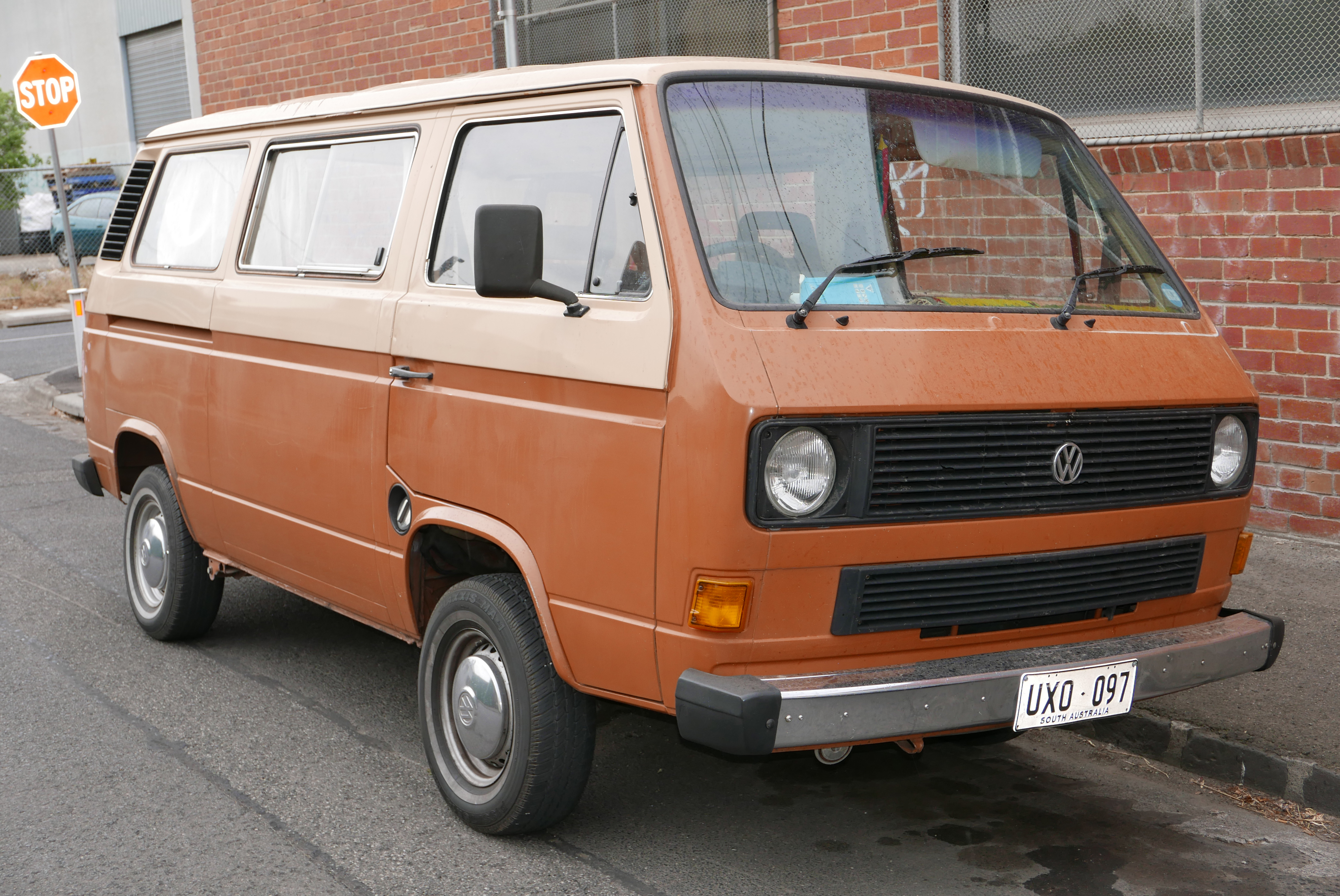

Overview
- Manufacturer: Volkswagen
- Also called: Volkswagen Transporter (Europe and Australia); Volkswagen Caravelle (Europe and Australia); Volkswagen Vanagon (North America and South America); Volkswagen Danfo or Faragon (Nigeria); Volkswagen Microbus (South Africa)
- Production: May 1979 – June 2002
- Assembly: Germany: Hannover; Austria: Graz (Puch; Syncro); South Africa: Uitenhage

Body and chassis
- Class: Light commercial vehicle (M)
- Body style: 3-door van 3-door pickup
- Layout: Rear-engine, rear-wheel-drive or four-wheel-drive
- Platform: Volkswagen Group T3 platform

Powertrain
- Engine: petrol: 1.6 L air-cooled H4; 1.9 L H4; 2.0 L air-cooled H4; 2.1 L H4; 2.3 L I5; 2.5 L I5; 2.6 L I5; diesel: 1.6 L I4; 1.6 L turbo I4; 1.7 L I4
- Transmission: 4/5-speed manual transaxle 3-speed automatic transaxle

Dimensions
- Wheelbase: 2,455–2,480 mm (96.7–97.6 in)
- Length: 4,569 mm (179.9 in)
- Width: 1,844–1,870 mm (72.6–73.6 in)
- Height: 1,928 mm (75.9 in); 1,735 mm (68.3 in) (Carat); 2,055 mm (80.9 in) (Camper); 2,085 mm (82.1 in) (GL syncro)
- Kerb weight: 1,395 kg (3,075 lb)

Chronology
- Predecessor: Volkswagen Type 2 (T2)
- Successor: Volkswagen Transporter (T4)

The Volkswagen Type 25 (T3) is the third generation of the Volkswagen Transporter. It was marketed under various nameplates worldwide – including the Transporter or Caravelle in Europe and Australia, Type 25 (T25) in the UK, Microbus and Kombi in South Africa, Kampeerauto in Netherlands, Combi in France and Vanagon in North and South America.

It was larger, heavier, and more angular in its styling than its T2 predecessor, but shared the same rear-engine, cab-over design. It was produced in a rear wheel drive version as well as a 4WD version marketed as "Syncro."

The T3 was manufactured in Hannover, Germany from 1978 until 1991. Production of the Syncro continued until 1992 at Puch in Graz, Austria, where all 4WDs were built. A limited number of 2WD models were also produced at the Graz factory after German production had ended. South African production of the T3 continued, for that market only, until 2002.

The T3 was the final generation of rear-engined Volkswagens.

== History ==
While the T3 initially featured air-cooled engines, later years had water-cooled engines in both boxer and inline configurations.

Volkswagen marketed the Westfalia camper variant throughout the T3 production, with features including a raised roof (either pop-up or fixed), refrigerator, sink, and stove.

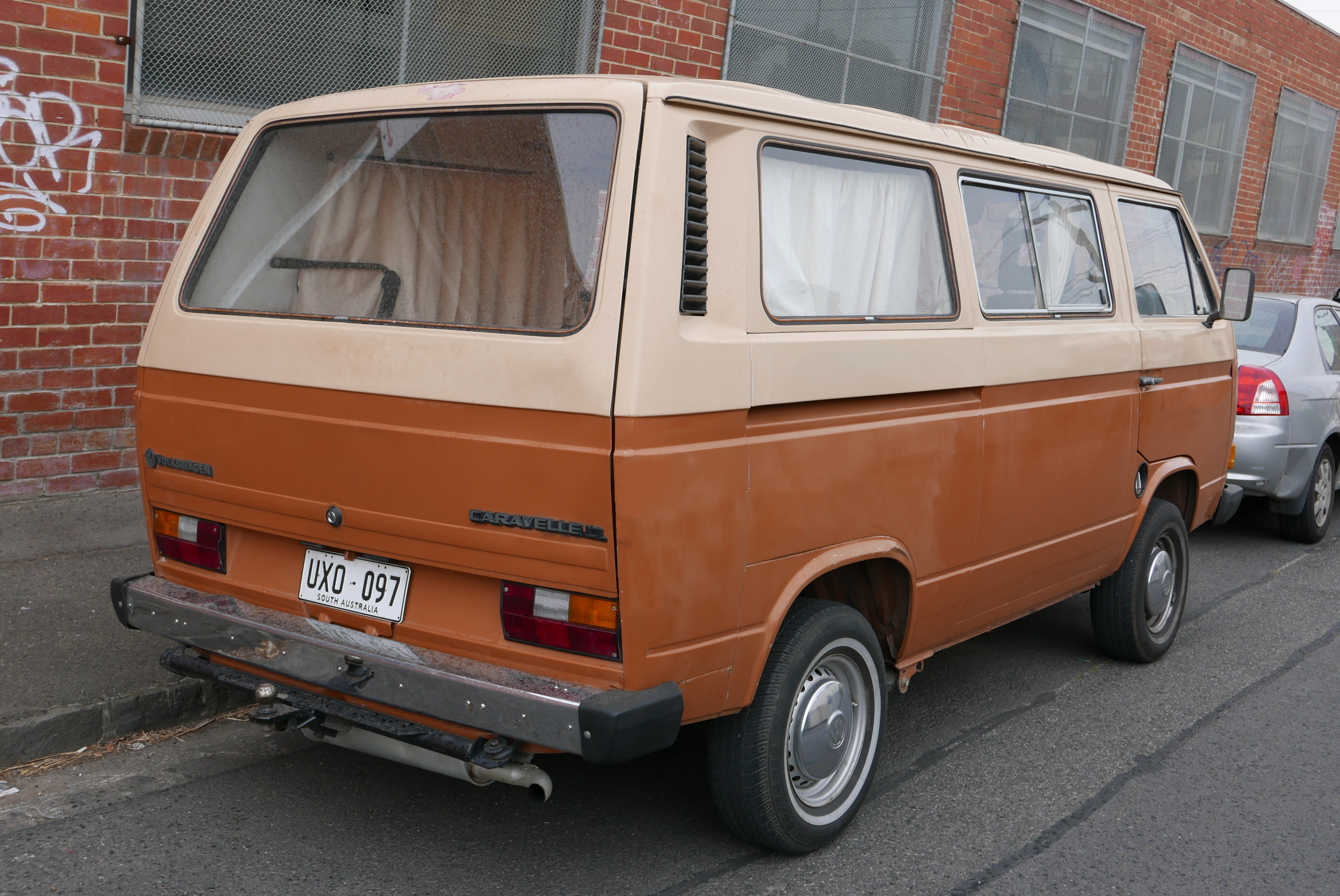
Van

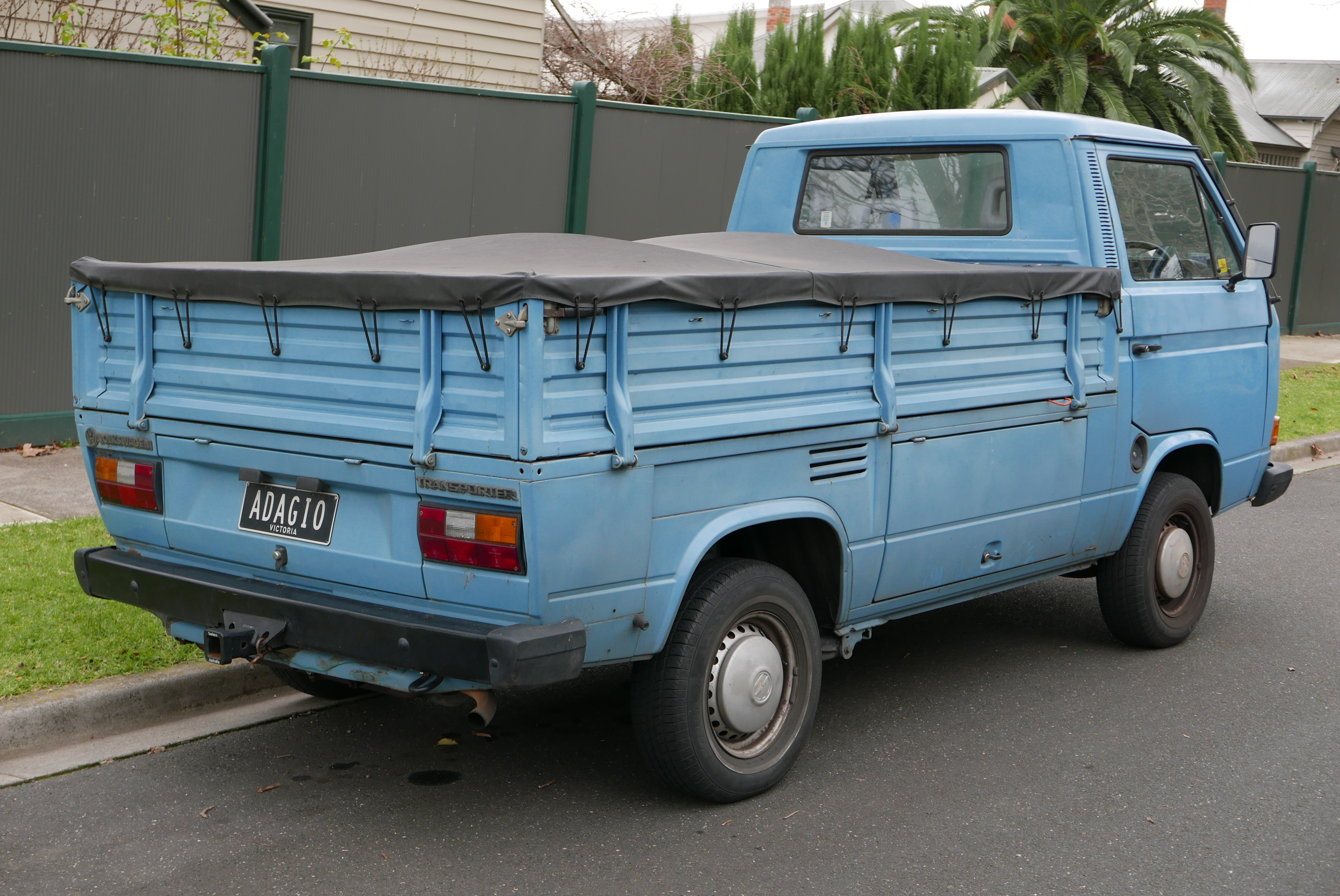
Utility

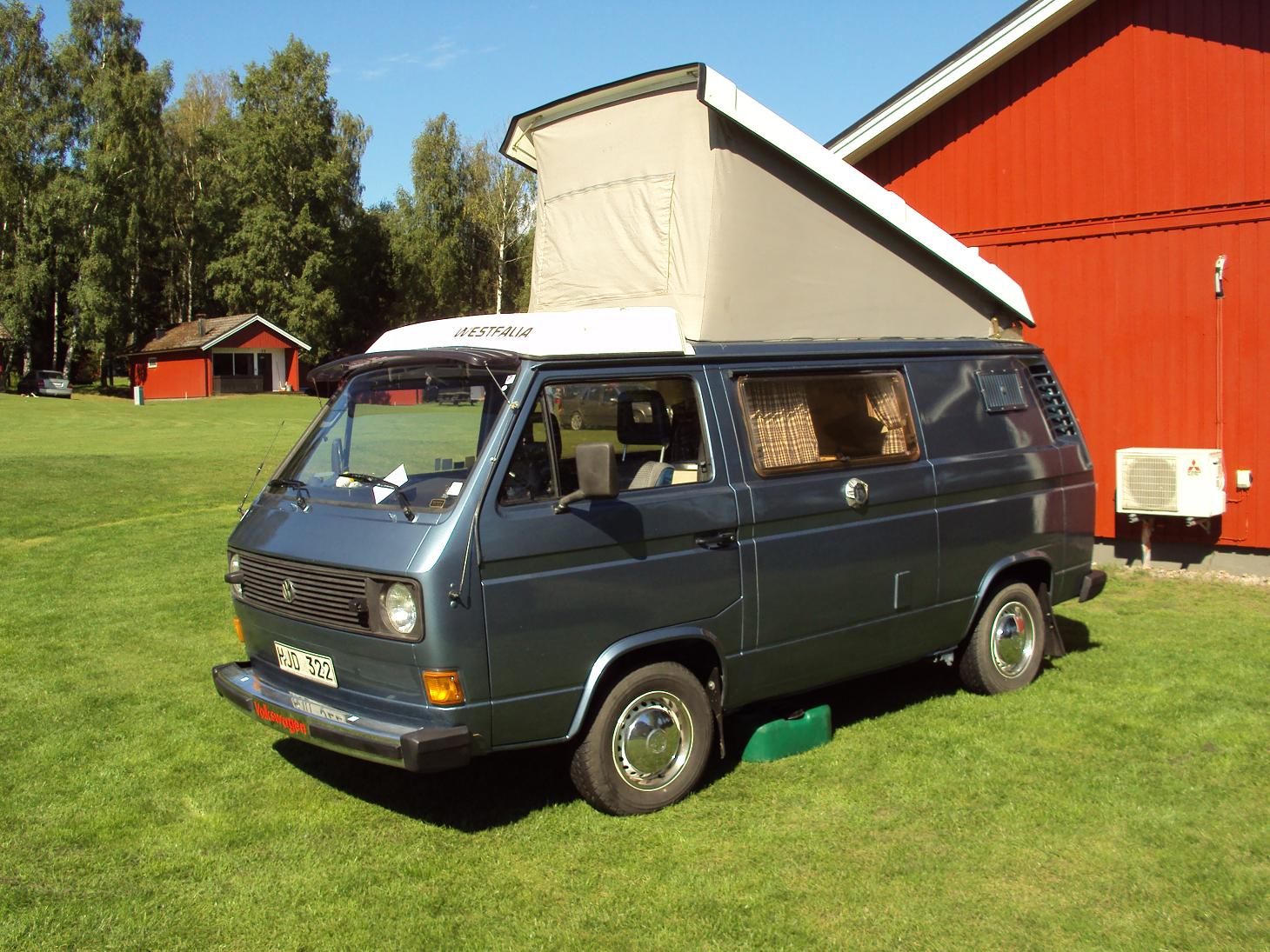
Volkswagen T3 Westfalia Camper

Examples built between 1979 and 1985 featured round headlights and basic steel or chrome-plated steel bumpers with plastic end-caps. Air-cooled models (1979 to mid-1983) lack the lower grille above the radiator of the water-cooled models, except on models with factory air conditioning. Production of the Syncro four-wheel drive model began in late 1984, with its official debut taking place at the Brussels Commercial Vehicle Show in January 1985. The original Syncros came with the 78 PS (57 kW) 1.9 L petrol Wasserboxer and a "4+G" gearbox, with G being a low gear for offroad use (Gelände in German).

1986 model year revisions include a tachometer, more fabric choices, redesigned air conditioning, enlarged water-cooled engine with a more advanced engine management system, and redesigned transmissions. Exterior changes include rectangular headlights (on selected models), and different paint options. Alloy wheels and larger fiberglass bumpers with trim along the rocker panels were optional (standard on Hannover and Wolfsburg Edition vans). For the 1990 and 1991 model years, a "Carat" trim level was available which included all available options except the Westfalia conversion and Syncro.

Some 1979 through 1981 models received 6 welded-in metal slats covering the engine ventilation passages behind the rear windows. All later models had black plastic 16-slat covers that slotted in at the top and screwed down at the bottom.

During the 1980s, the U.S. Army and Air Force in Germany used T3s as administrative (non-tactical) vehicles. In military use, the vehicle's nomenclature was "Light Truck, Commercial".

== Features ==
With the engine and transaxle mounted very low in the back, the T3 had much larger disc brakes in the front, and drums in the rear. Axle weight is very nearly equal on both the front and back ends of the vehicle. Unlike the earlier T2, the T3 was available with amenities such as power steering, air conditioning, power door locks, electrically controlled and heated mirrors, lighted vanity mirrors, and a light above the glove box. Some of these were standard equipment in later, non-commercial vehicle models.

The automatic transmission was the same 090/010 hydraulic three-speed unit used in Audis of the era, and featured a cast aluminium alloy case for the transmission section and a cast iron case for the final drive section.

The 091 manual transmission was a four-speed unit featuring a lightweight aluminium alloy case. From 1983 a 5-speed transmission was available as an option on certain models. A 5-speed was standard equipment on Syncro four-wheel-drive models.

The automatic features a 1.0 ratio top gear, while the manual features a 0.85 top gear.

The oil filler tube for the engine is located behind the flip-down license plate door, as is the oil dipstick and the power steering fluid reservoir (when fitted) on Petrol models. Diesel models have the reservoir in the front right corner of the engine bay. Early models had a twist-on/off non-locking gas cap right on the outside just under and behind the passenger side door. A locking cap was standard on later models. 4 Wheel Drive (Syncro) models have the fuel tank in the rear above the transmission so the filler is on the right-side rear corner. The spare tyre lies in a tray under the very front of the van, just below the radiator.

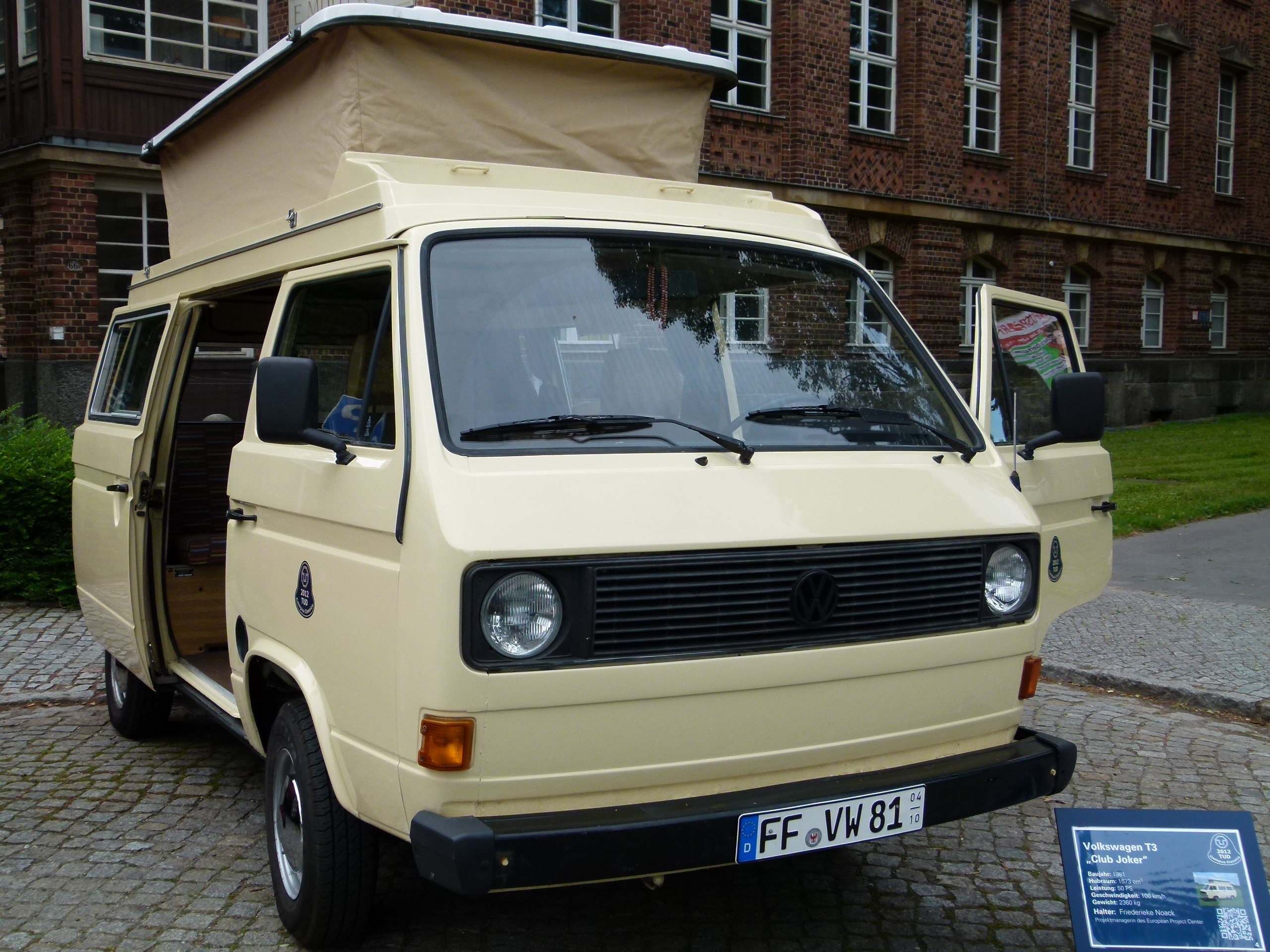
Volkswagen T3, Club Joker, 1981, Air-cooled, one front grille

== Engines ==
Because of the engine placement, a T3 has nearly equal 50/50 weight distribution fore and aft. The early air-cooled engines were somewhat expensive to produce and had some reliability problems. Volkswagen originally meant to replace them with the Golf's inline-four engine but the cost of re-engineering both car and engine made them opt for updating the flat-four instead. An overhead-cam design was mooted but rejected as a willingness to rev was considered to be of less importance than low-end flexibility and low cost. The new 1.9 L "Volkswagen Wasserboxer engine" was also originally considered for use in certain other Volkswagens such as the Gol, which still relied on the old air-cooled flat-four at that time.

The U.S version 1.9-litre and up water-cooled petrol engines experienced significant and repeated problems with cylinder head surface erosion and coolant leaks. 2.1 L engines suffered the same, mostly due to not having the antifreeze changed often enough, and the use of phosphated coolant, which caused corrosion in the cooling system.

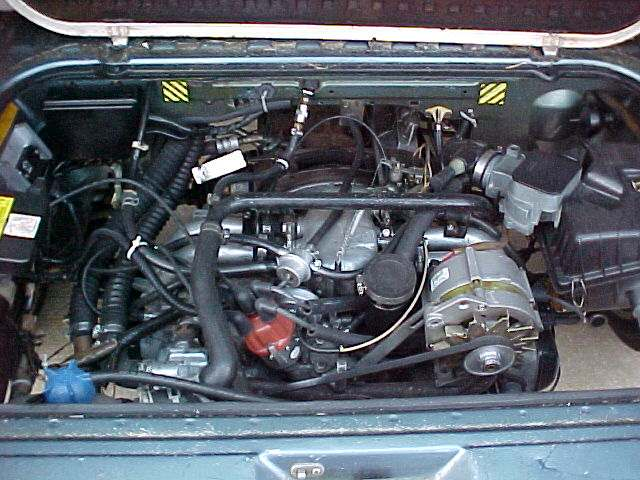
Volkswagen Wasserboxer engine

=== Petrol engines ===
There were four general petrol engine variants between 1979 and 1991, with several sub-models. All were flat-four boxer engines with overhead valves, push-rods, and rocker arms. Available engine options differed between regions.

- Air-cooled (1979–1983)

Type 1 engine:

  - 1.6 L (1,584 cc) 50 bhp (37 kW) (Serial # CT) air-cooled, single Solex 34 PICT-4 carburettor (not available in the United States)

Type 4 engine

  - 2.0 L (1,970 cc) 70 bhp (52 kW) (Serial # CU or CV) air-cooled, twin Solex 34 PDSIT-2/3 carburettor or fuel injected (Bosch L-Jetronic) flat-four in the 1980 to 1983 models

The Wasserboxer features an aluminium case, cylinder heads, and pistons, and a forged steel crankshaft. As with earlier VW boxer engines, it has a gear-driven camshaft. It also features Heron, or "bowl-in-piston" combustion chambers, where combustion takes place within the piston bowl area rather than in the cylinder head as would be the case with flat top pistons. The switch to water-cooled boxer engines was made mid-year in 1983. T2 transporters or 'bay window' vans, produced in Brazil until 2013, were switched to inline-four-cylinder water-cooled engines and a front-mounted radiator in 2005. Over 3 million vans were produced in Sao Paulo, Brazil.

- Water-cooled (1983 onwards)
  - 1.9 Litre engines:
    - 1.9 L (1,913 cc) 83 bhp (62 kW) (Serial # DH) "Wasserboxer" engine used for the 1983 to 1985 models, has a fuel injection system known as "Digijet" (Digital Jet-tronic)
    - 1.9 L (1,913 cc) 59 bhp (44 kW) (Serial # DF) 8.6:1 compression ratio, 34-PICT carburettor
    - 1.9 L (1,913 cc) 76 bhp (57 kW) (Serial # DG) 8.6:1 compression ratio, 2E3 or 2E4 carburettor
    - 1.9 L (1,913 cc) 55 bhp (41 kW) (Serial # EY) 7.5:1 compression ratio, 34-PICT carburettor
    - 1.9 L (1,913 cc) 89 bhp (66 kW) (Serial # GW) 8.6:1 compression ratio, Bosch Digijet electronic fuel injection
  - 2.1 Litre engines:
    - 2.1 L (2,109 cc) 95 bhp (71 kW) (Serial # MV) Wasserboxer, used until the end of Vanagon importation to the US in 1991. Uses an engine management system known as Bosch "Digifant" which digitally manages both ignition timing and fuel delivery.
    - 2.1 L (2,109 cc) 90 bhp (67 kW) (Serial # SS) 9:1 compression ratio Wasserboxer
    - 2.1 L (2,109 cc) 112 bhp (84 kW) (torque 128) (Serial # DJ) 10.3:1 compression ratio, Digijet injection, only sold in European countries not requiring catalytic converter.

=== Diesel engines ===
In contrast to the petrol engines' flat-four layout, the diesel engine options were all of an inline-four configuration. A turbodiesel arrived in January 1985.

- 1.6 L (1,588 cc) 37 kW (50 PS; 50 bhp) (Serial # CS) Naturally aspirated diesel I4. In the US this was available on 1982 and 1983 models only.
- 1.6 L (1,588 cc) 51 kW (69 PS; 68 bhp) (Serial # JX) Turbocharged I4.
- 1.7 L (1,715 cc) 42 kW (57 PS; 56 bhp) (Serial # KY) Naturally aspirated I4.

== U.S. model variations ==
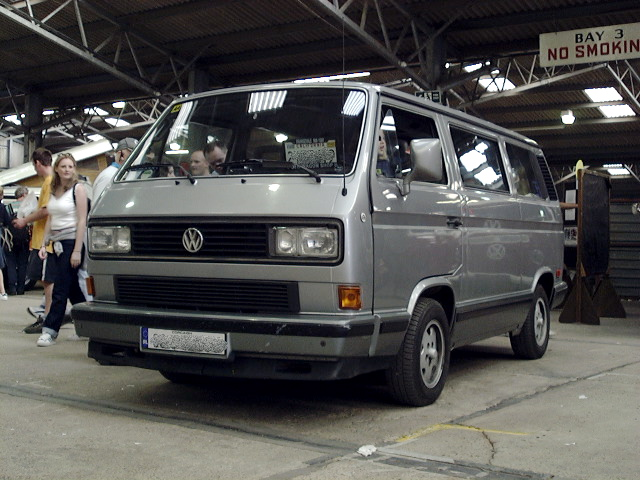
1988 California-spec VW Vanagon Wolfsburg Edition

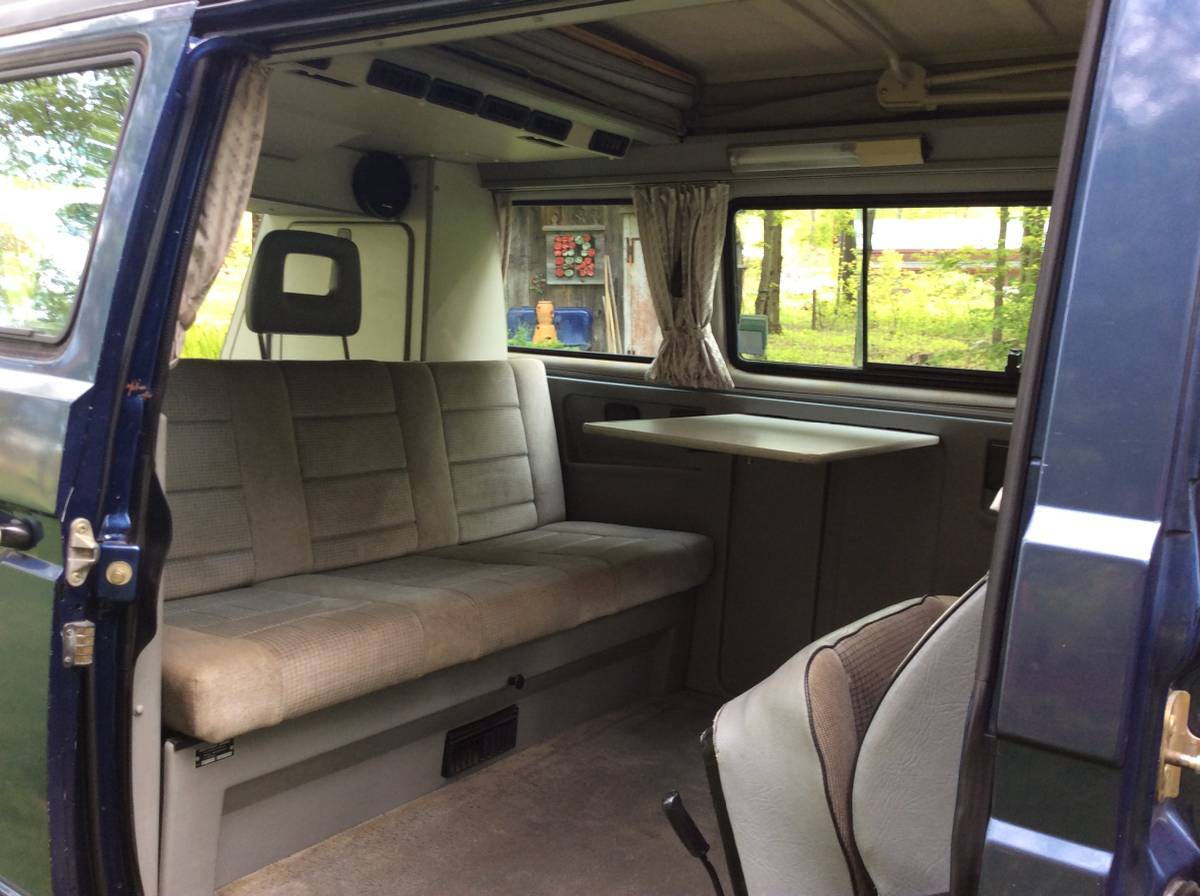
1991 US Vanagon Multivan Interior

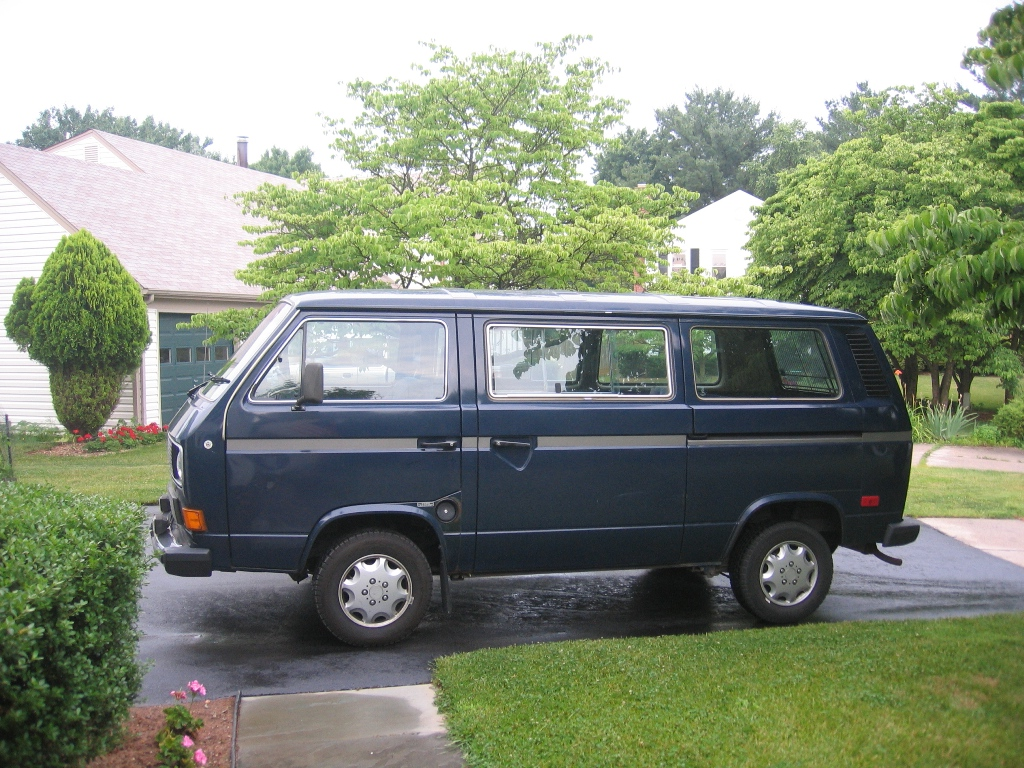
1984 US Vanagon Wolfsburg Edition

In the U.S., the T3 was sold as the Vanagon, which is a portmanteau of van and station wagon. The name Vanagon was coined by Volkswagen to highlight their claim that the T3 had the room of a van, but drove like a station wagon. U.S. Vanagon model variations included the Vanagon, featuring vinyl seats and a spartan interior; the Vanagon L with optional cloth seats, more upscale interior panels, and an optional dashboard blower; the Vanagon GL with more equipment like a padded steering wheel and front armrests; and the Westfalia pop-top camper Vanagons, which came in two versions. A Camper version known as the "Campmobile" with integrated kitchen, complete with refrigerator (which ran on propane, 110 V or 12 V), a two-burner stove, and stainless steel sink with onboard water supply. A fold-down rear bench seat converted to a bed and the pop-top included a fold-out bed; these models could sleep four adults. A 'Weekender ' version that lacked the refrigerator, propane stove, and sink of the full 'camper' versions offered an optional removable cabinet with a 12 volt cooler and self-contained sink. In 1984, the Wolfsburg edition was configured with a rear bench seat and two forward-facing middle seats. Under the bench seat, which folded down to make full-size bed, was a storage compartment and a rear heater.

Wolfsburg Edition "Weekender" models featured two rear-facing seats behind the front seats in place of a centre bench seat and a table that could fold up from the sidewall – or fold down when not in use. Multivan models featured Wolfsburg Edition trim and an interior with rear-facing seats, the same fold up table, a pop-top with an upper bed, and cabinet behind the rear seat on the driver's side. Wolfsburg Edition and camper van vehicles were outfitted for Volkswagen by the Westfalia factory.

Syncro models were manufactured in limited numbers from 1984 through 1992, with the four-wheel-drive system added by Steyr-Daimler-Puch Works in Graz, Austria, with a short wheelbase and 48/52 front/rear weight distribution. The majority of the Syncro production run used the same 14 inch wheels as the RWD version. A limited number of 16" Syncro versions were also produced. The main differences between the 2 models was 16" wheels with 205R16 tyres, larger front brakes 280mm discs instead of 254mm disc that was on the 14" Syncro but they shared the same calipers and brake pads. The 16" Syncro had larger rear brakes taken from the VW LT and fender flares which hid the area where VW trimmed the arches to give more room for larger tyres.

Model years 1980 through 1985 featured round sealed beam headlights. Subsequent models for North American and European markets featured round sealed beam headlights or smaller square headlights, with the primary lights outboard and high beams inboard. Later models from South Africa returned to round headlight housings for both the primary headlights and high-beams. This is known to VW enthusiasts as the "South African look," and swapping the square headlights to round headlights is a popular conversion by van owners with non-South African vehicles.

The T3 was replaced by the T4 (Eurovan) in the U.S. market in 1993 (1992 saw no Volkswagen vans imported to the U.S. market, aside from custom campers sold by companies other than Volkswagen). Top-of-the-line Wolfsburg Edition Westfalia Campers, which had all options, were at the top of the price range. In addition to the camper models, a Carat trim level was available for 1990 and 1991 model years. This model included all options available for the Vanagon. Some models featured optional aluminium alloy wheels.

== South African models ==
Production of the T3 continued in South Africa until June 2002, when, due to the economies of scale, Volkswagen SA were obliged to discontinue production after parts supply started to become an issue. The post-1991 South African T3s had a face-lift which included modified front door sheet metal, bigger side windows behind the B pillars, and different rear grilles in the D pillars. The bodyshell is a true RHD design lacking the unused door track cover on the offside and LHD wiper arm mount points found on earlier models which had adapted a LHD twin-sliding door bodyshell. On models with 5-cylinder engines, the boot floor was raised to accommodate the taller engine, leaving small storage areas either side of the engine hatch. Internal changes include a fully padded dashboard featuring a smaller glove box and updated vacuum-powered ventilation controls operated by round knobs rather than slide levers, while the fuse box was also relocated to the right-hand side of the steering column. At the front of the vehicle, twin headlamps in both round and rectangular configurations were fitted along with a full-width lower grille incorporating the indicator lenses, which were changed from amber to smoked lenses from 1999 onwards. This grille and headlight combination was not found anywhere else in the world. These later South African T3s became known as Big Window T3s due to their larger side windows.

In January 1991 the 2.1-litre Wasserboxer engines were replaced with five-cylinder Audi engines in the "Microbus" and "Caravelle", while a VW 1.8-litre inline-four cylinder engine was used in the "Kombi" and "Van" models. A 2.1-litre Wasserboxer Syncro Big Window model was also added, in Microbus or Caravelle trim. 89 Big Window Syncros were sold in 1992; the big-window body was used in the Syncro from 1990 and in 1991, mixed in the "German" small-window body, so exact numbers of Big Window Syncros are unknown, although 89 were sold in 1992. The Syncro model was discontinued in 1992. There were also 4 or 5 factory-built 5 cylinder 2.5i Syncros, with K-Jetronic fuel injection, 16" rear trailing arms and brakes and 15" wheels. One was in a small window body, 3 are known to survive (1 small window, and 2 Big Window Syncros). The five-cylinder T3s came out initially with a 2.5-litre K-Jetronic fuel-injected engine in 1991, but this was replaced in March 1995 with a 2.6-litre with an improved fuel injection system and two styles of 15" alloy wheels as standard (Rhein or Starburst) along with larger ventilated front disc brakes. The automatic option for the 2.5-litre was dropped, leaving only the five-speed manual. A slightly lower spec 2.3-litre five-cylinder fuel-injected model was introduced four months after the 2.6-litre, but was equipped with a 4-speed transmission and modified wraparound steel bumpers. There was also a basic bus, with an inline-4 inclined 1.8-litre carburettor engine. The 1.8-litre carb motor was a Golf-derived motor, fitted into the bus like an inline-4 diesel in a T3. Called the "Volksie bus", it was a basic bus, with steel 15" rims, single round headlights, steel wraparound bumpers, and with no aircon or PAS.

Near the end of production, a top of the range Caravelle 2.6i known as the "Exclusiv" incorporated two rear-facing seats in place of the centre bench seat, a fridge and a folding table in the back of the vehicle and Carat 2 alloy wheels. A Microbus 2.6i with similar features, but with Rhein alloy wheels were known as the "Activ". The last T3 off the production line in Uitenhage on Friday 16 June 2002 was a gold-coloured Microbus 2.6i which Volkswagen SA retained for their AutoPavilion, Place of Cars and Legends, which first opened its doors in 2004. The vehicle was later written off in a transporter roll-over accident in November 2006, after returning from a display in Cape Town.

Five-cylinder Audi engines used

- 1.8 I4 (AAX) 70 kW (95 PS) at 5200 rpm
- 2.3i I5 (AFU) 90 kW (122 PS)
- 2.5i I5 (AAY) 100 kW (136 PS)
- 2.6i I5 (ADV) 100 kW (136 PS) at 5200 rpm

== Safety and Crash Tests ==
In 1994, the Swedish insurance company, Folksam tested a Vanagon T3 in a head-on collision with a Volvo 700 series wagon (estate). The crash test was full-frontal (50/50) at 31 mph (50 km/h). The result was that the driver of the Volvo would have received a head injury criterion (HIC) of 3868. An HIC of 1000 is considered deadly. The Vanagon driver would receive a HIC of only 155. Furthermore, the "chest impact" for the Volvo driver was 65. A chest impact of 60 is considered deadly. The Vanagon driver's impact was only 30.

Furthermore, the German engineering testing laboratory for the insurance industry Allianz Zentrum für Technik (AZT) performed tests on 4 June 1984 in Japan. The results were published in the September 1984 ADAC Motorwelt journal. The Vanagon/Caravelle with subjected to crash tests into a fixed 40% barrier at 35 km/h, which corresponds to a head-on collision at 50–55 km/h. According to AZT, this test is said to be representative of 90% of all accidents. A series of these crash tests were performed, which compared the T3 to similar vans manufactured by Nissan, Isuzu, Mitsubishi, and two vans from Toyota. The written results stated, "The Volkswagen Transporter type 2 affords excellent passenger safety". "The legs were not endangered. And the legroom was only slightly restricted." All doors opened easily. With regard to repair of the vehicles after the crash tests, the five Japanese vehicles were declared a "total loss" or "write-offs". Regarding the Vanagon, the report states "It would be possible to fully repair the VW type 2 at reasonable cost".

Crash tests were also conducted using US market vehicles by Californian firms Calspan and NTS on behalf of the NHTSA. Three full-frontal tests at speeds of 30–35 mph (48–56 km/h) with a fixed barrier were conducted between 1980 and 1988. While all three tests showed minor passenger compartment intrusion, the resultant HIC for the driver of the Vanagon ranged between 1313 and 1905. The passenger dummy fared better receiving a HIC between 831 and 1060.

In a 47 mph (76 km/h) crash between the front of a Volkswagen LT31 (structurally the same as a T3) and rear of a stationary full-size Chevrolet Impala, the rear of the Impala was completely destroyed, with the rear trunk being pushed up to just behind the driver's seat while the VW remained "operational" (drivable), "the doors could be opened relatively easily", and "the deformation of the interior was negligible", as declared by the testing agency.

In an rollover test of "a fully equipped VW (Type 2 T3) Westfalia customized camping vehicle" traveling 'sideways' at a speed of 31 mph (50 km/h) on a specially designed 'sled' that 'launched' the vehicle causing two complete rollovers, the report found that "the roof remained fully intact and the doors remained closed". The report went on to say, "If passengers wear seatbelts, the danger of injury in this kind of accident is relatively low". In another rollover test, the T3 was rolled down a 32 ft (10 m) hill — equivalent to a 3-story building. This resulted in the van flipping over 4 1/2 times. It was reported, "the shape of the body and the roof remained intact."

These vans were made with a "forward deformation zone" consisting of four "side members" below and in front of the passenger compartment making a four-pronged forked frame with a "deformation element" which is mounted in front of this making it extremely effective at absorbing impact. The front cab has extensive protection by means of four vertical struts that connect an impact-absorbing box section cross-member. Additionally, there is another box framed horizontal strut on the inside of the vehicle that attaches to the door frames. And another yet goes through the sides of the doors to help protect passengers from lateral impact. The steering wheel has two energy-absorbing buckle points, with a detachable steering column that prevents the steering wheel from being pushed into the cabin. The spare tire, which is mounted on the underside in the front of the vehicle, is also used to absorb shock.

== Engine-swapped limited production versions ==
=== Porsche B32 ===
Porsche created a limited-edition version of the T3 called the B32. The van was based on the luxurious Carat model, and came equipped with the 231 PS (170 kW) 3.2 litre Carrera engine. It was originally developed to support Porsche's testing activities in Algeria. Ten were built, with some sold by Porsche to special customers, even having a Porsche VIN. Porsche themselves also used B32 buses to quickly transport staff. Top speed was around 135 mph (217 km/h), although Porsche only claimed 116 mph (187 km/h) to ensure that the numbers could be replicated with nine people in the car and with the air conditioning on full.

=== Claer CT3 ===
Customiser Claer built a small series of T3s with Porsche six-cylinder engines, called the CT3.

=== Oettinger T3 ===
Aftermarket VW specialist Oettinger offered their own Flat-six engine, called the Oettinger WBX6, in some VW Transporters. Development of this engine was undertaken by Oettinger under contract to Volkswagen, with the intent that it be used in the T3. When VW abandoned the project, Oettinger bought the rights to the design and brought it to market.

Technically, the WBX6 draws heavily on the original Wasserboxer design, and shares many parts with the four-cylinder engine. The WBX6 was originally only available with a three-speed automatic transmission incorporating many Audi 100 parts to accommodate the higher power and torque.

Approximately 45 WBX6 3.2i Oettinger engines were imported to South Africa.

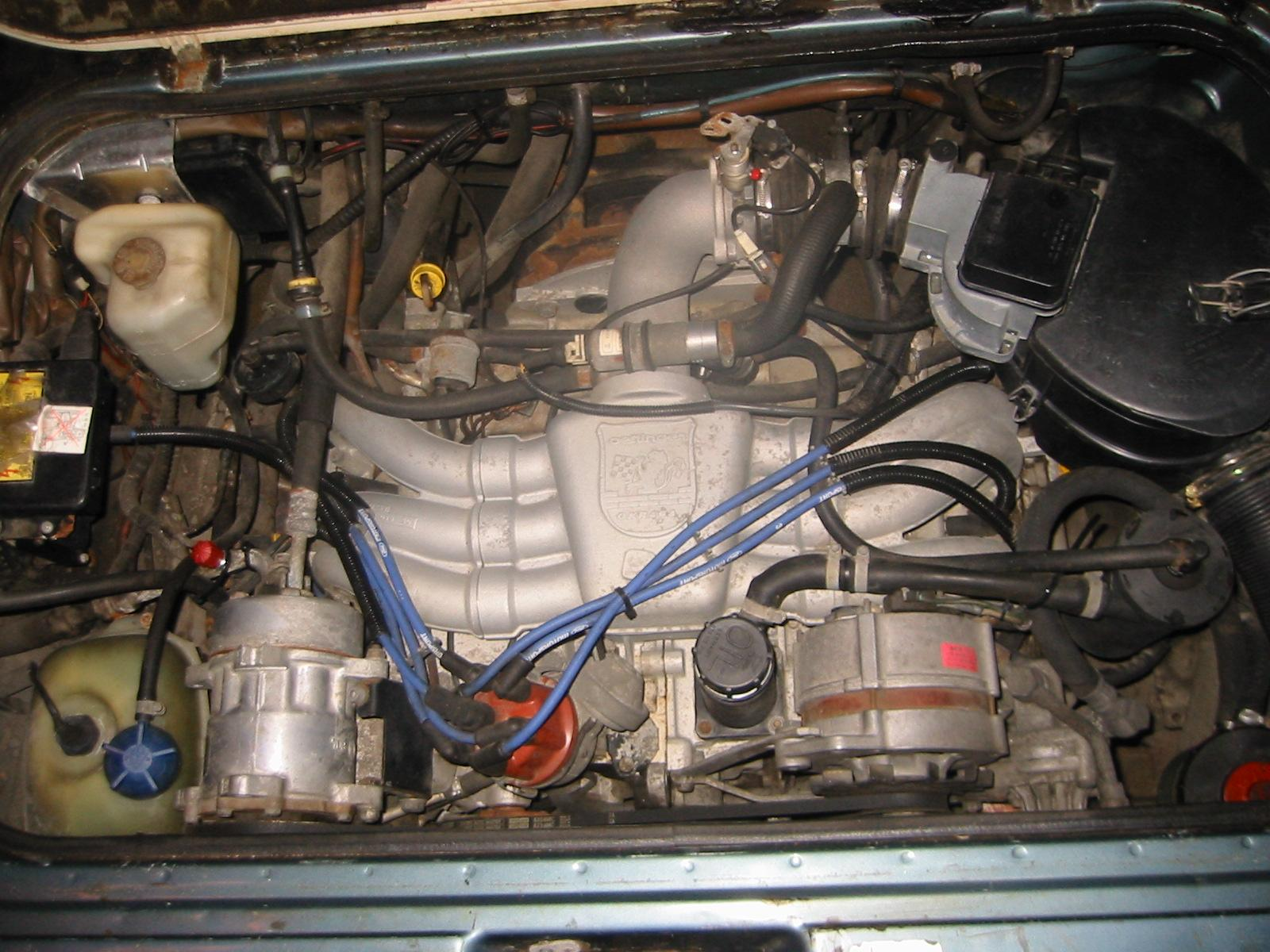
Oettinger WBX6, aftermarket six-cylinder engine

- Oettinger WBX6 (aftermarket)
  - 3.2 L (3,164 cc) 165 bhp (123 kW) VW-Oettinger Wasserboxer, fuel injected.
  - 3.7 L (3,664 cc) 180 bhp (134 kW) VW-Oettinger Wasserboxer, fuel injected.

== Today ==
The T3 has a large cult following, especially the Westfalia camper version. Many owners have had the VW engines replaced in pursuit of improved power and reliability, particularly the Wasserboxer due to phosphated coolant.

Apart from the Porsche and Oettinger engines, swaps have used Golf diesel engines, the 2.0 L Tiico Engine, Golf/Jetta petrol engines and Ford Zetec engines.

Subaru EJ engines are among the most popular engines to install for increased power, as the EJs flat-4 design is similar in size and configuration to the original VW engines.

== Gallery ==
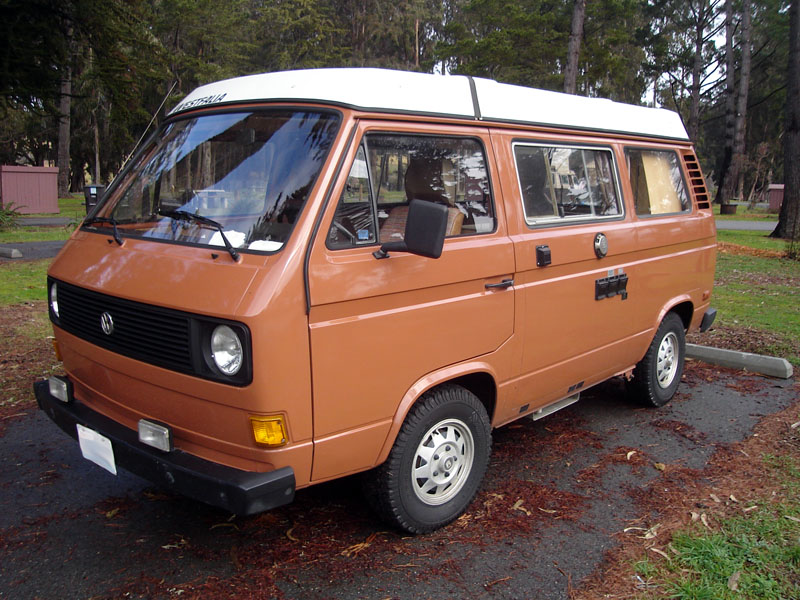
1980 Type 2 T3 Air-cooled Westfalia Camper

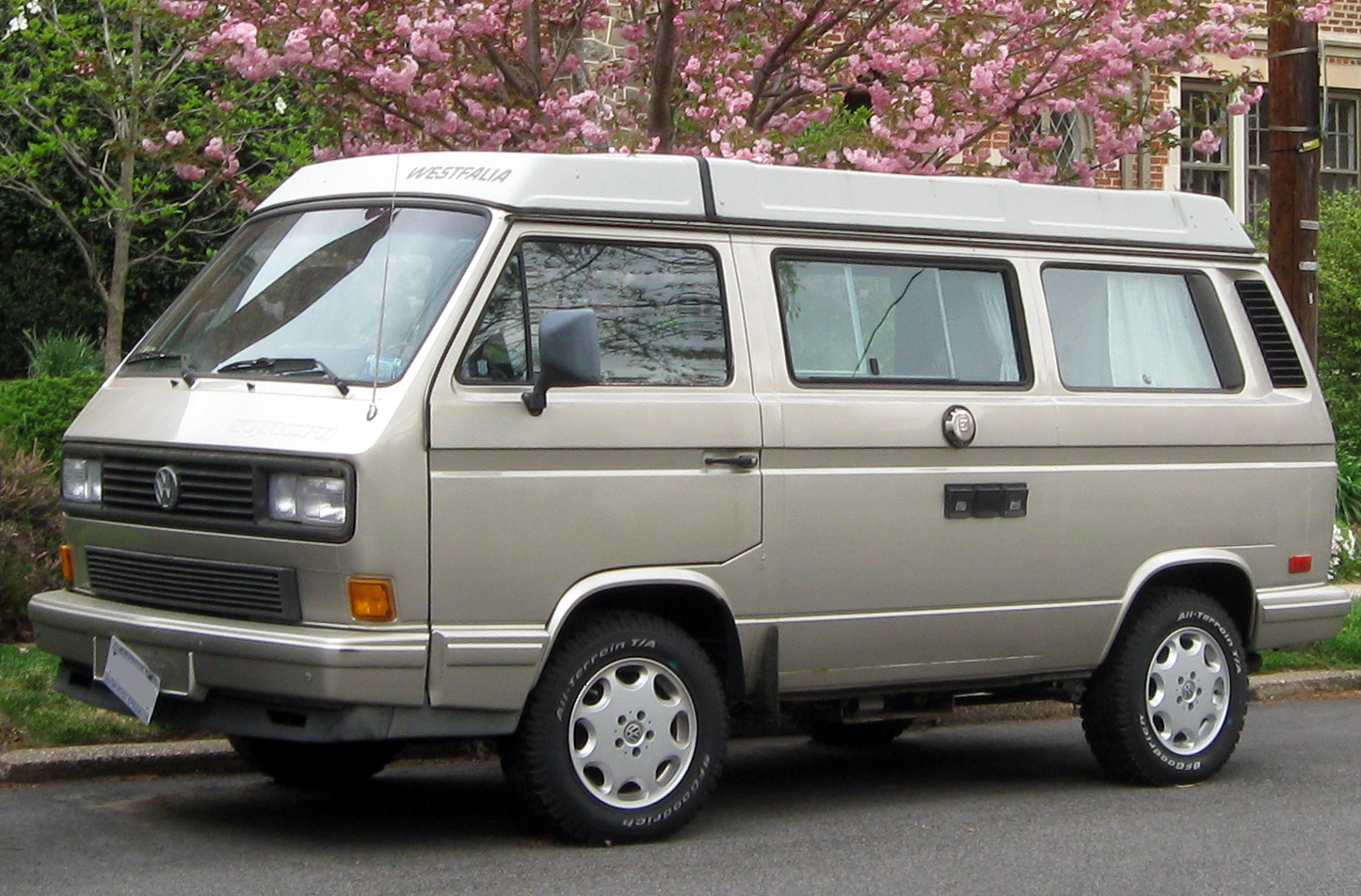
Vanagon Westfalia, water cooled (US)

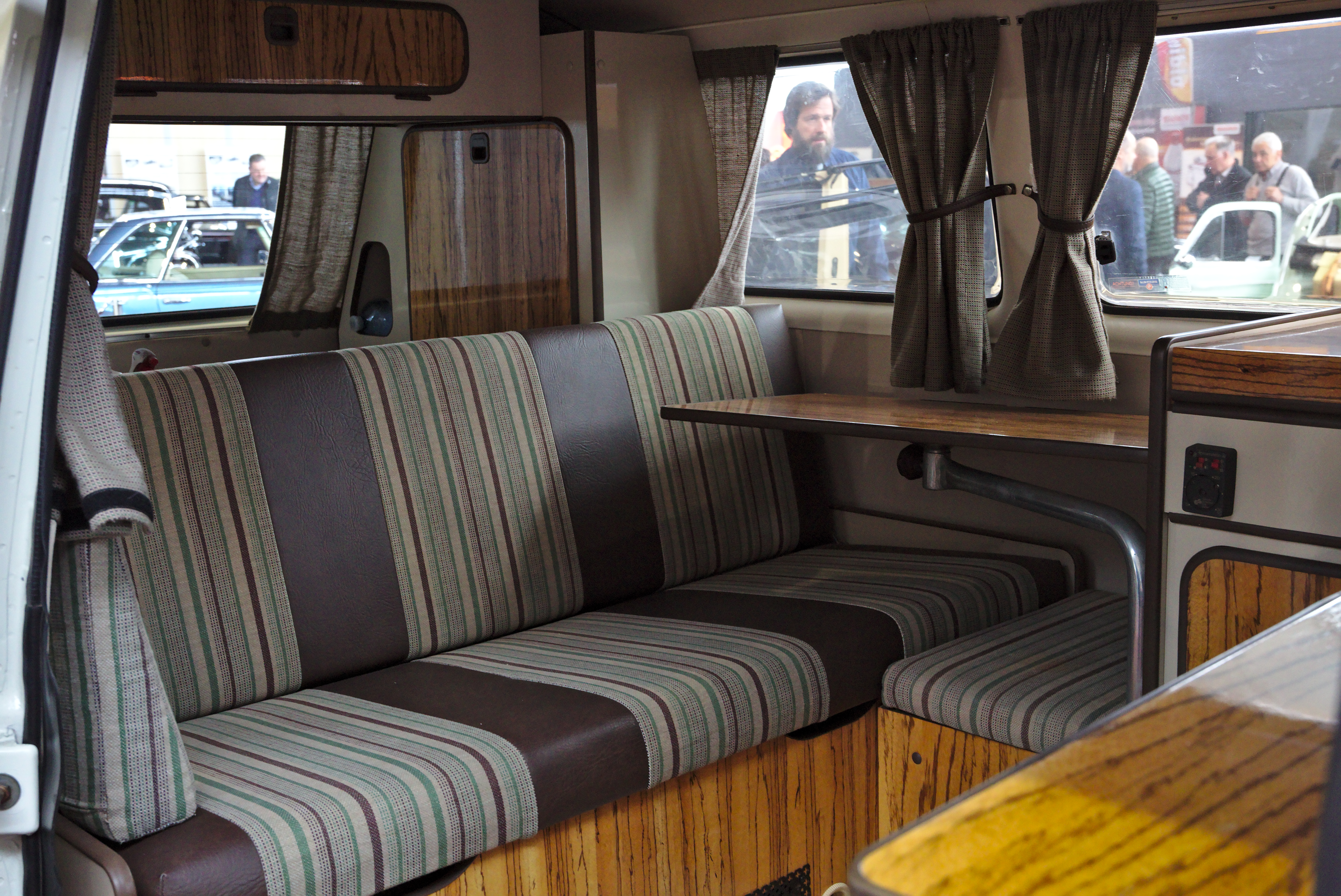
Vanagon interior

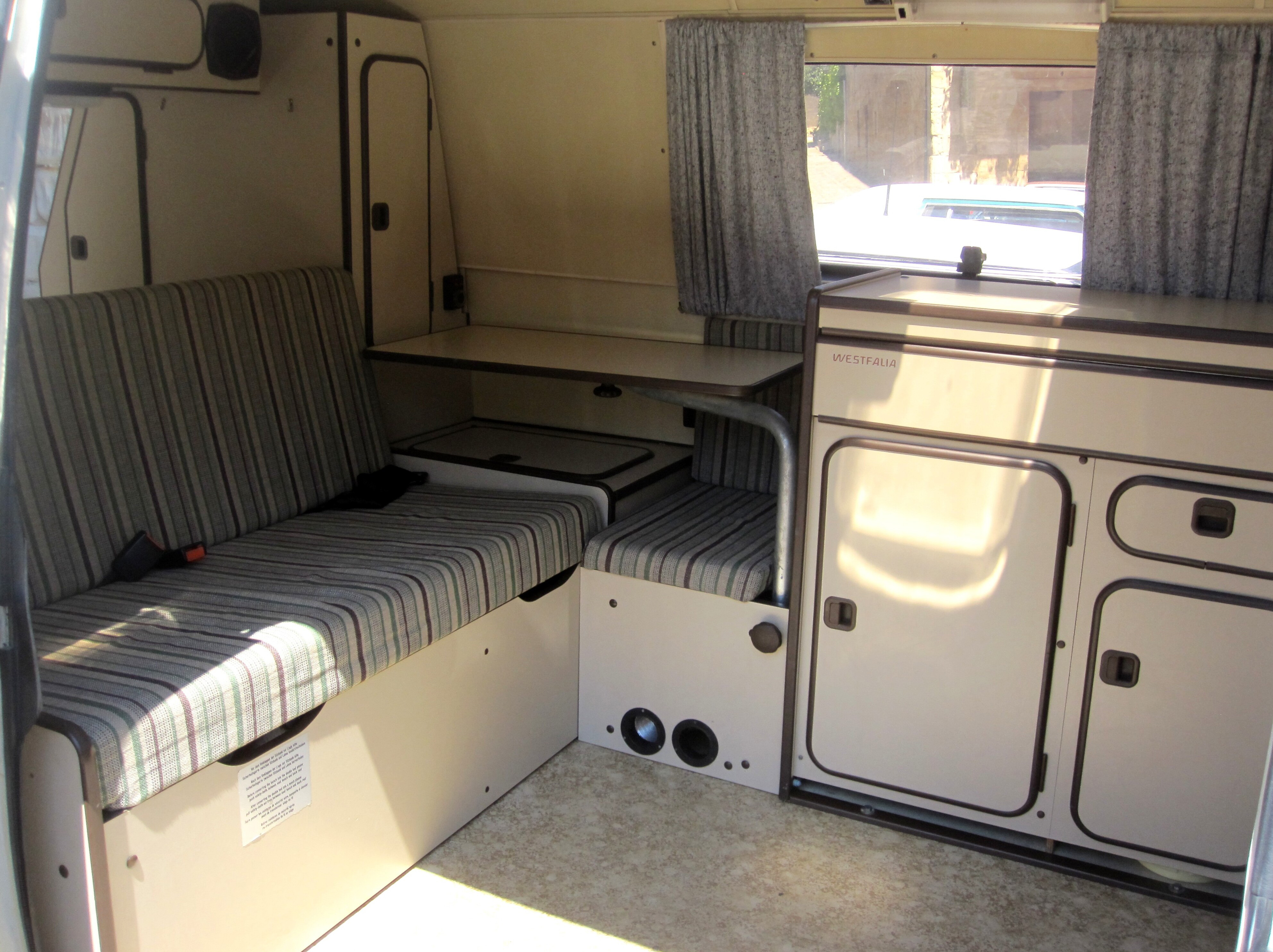
Vanagon interior

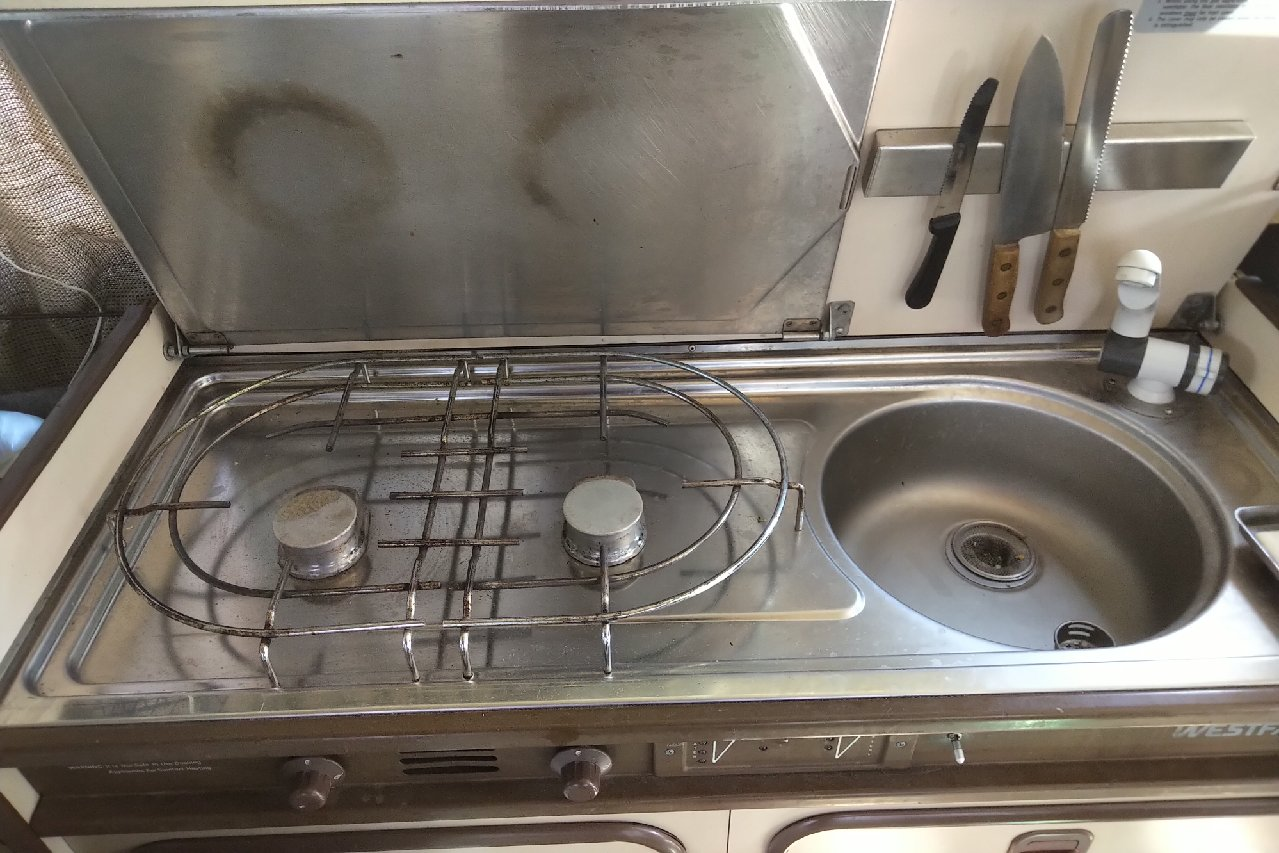
Vanagon Westfalia stove and sink

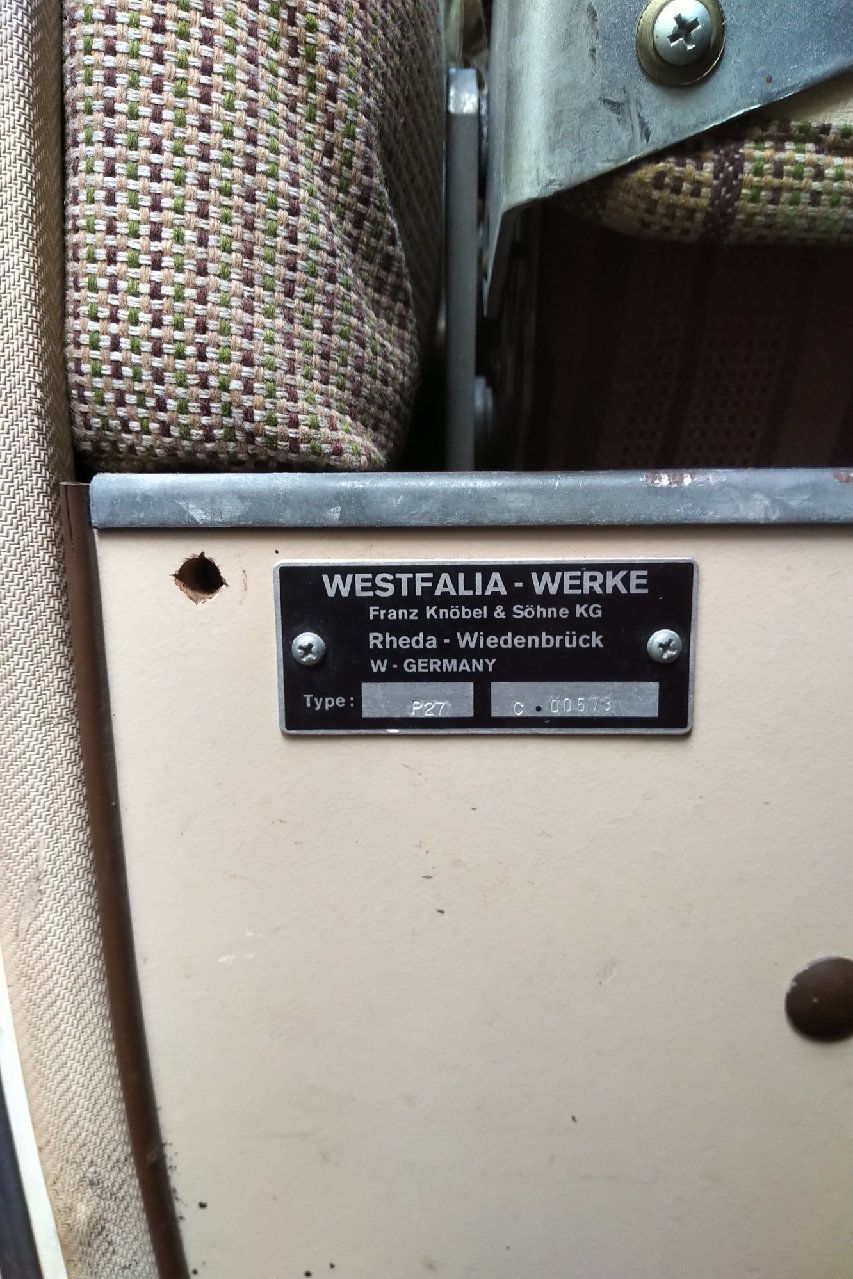
Vangon Westfalia name plate, used on all Westfalia products
