= Split screen =

Split screen may refer to:

- Split screen (computing), dividing graphics into adjacent parts
- a split screen effect in film or television
- Split Screen (TV series), 1997–2001
- Split screen, a focusing screen in a system camera
- Splitscreen, or Volkswagen Type 2, a light commercial vehicle 1950–1967

== See also ==
- Multi-screen (disambiguation)
- Dual Screen (disambiguation)
