= Multi-screen =

Multi-screen may refer to:

- Multi-screen video, video content that is transformed into multiple formats
- Multi-screen cinema, or multiplex (movie theater)
- Multi Screen Media, now Sony Pictures Networks India, an Indian media company

== See also ==
- Split screen (disambiguation)
- Dual Screen (disambiguation)
- Multi-monitor, multiple physical display devices
- Multitouch, technology that enables a surface to recognize more than one point of contact
- Multi-image, using 35mm slides
