= Compute (disambiguation) =

To compute is an act of computing, often by a computer, but it can also involve mental computation.

Compute may also refer to:

== Science ==
- Compute (machine learning), the amount of power required to train AI

== Art ==
- Compute! (1979–1983), often stylized as COMPUTE!, an American home computer magazine
- "Compute" (1986), a song from Song X by American jazz guitarist Pat Metheny and saxophonist Ornette Coleman
- "Compute" (1989), a song from Art Deco by Don Cherry, American jazz trumpeter, bandleader, and multi-instrumentalist
- "Compute" (2004), a song from Any Minute Now by Soulwax, Belgian electronic and DJ/production collective
- "Compute" (1998), a TV episode from The Journey of Allen Strange, American science fiction

== See also ==
- Computer (disambiguation)
