= Dual screen =

Dual screen may refer to:

- A multi-monitor setup with two monitors
- Dual-touchscreen, a display setup for computers or phones
- Second screen, a device (e.g. mobile device) providing an enhanced viewing experience for content on another device (e.g. a TV)

== See also ==
- Multi-screen (disambiguation)
- Computer (disambiguation)
- Phone (disambiguation)
- Nintendo DS, a dual-screen handheld game console
