= Ben Pon Sr. =

Dutch businessman (1904–1968)

Bernardus Marinus "Ben" Pon Sr. (April 27, 1904 – May 15, 1968) was a Dutch businessman. In 1947, Pon's Automobielhandel ("Pon's Car Dealership"), became the first dealer outside of Germany to sell vehicles manufactured by Volkswagen.

Ben's father, Mijndert Pon, owned a shop (founded in 1898) that sold sewing machines, household articles and tobacco goods at Arnhemseweg (Arnhem Road) in Amersfoort. Later, he added Opel bicycles and motorized bicycles to his range of goods. Beginning in 1920, Pon sold Opel and Ford automobiles as well as Continental tires. Ben and his brother Wijnand took over the shop in 1931 and renamed it Pon's Automobielhandel. On August 8, 1947, The Pons became Volkswagen's general importer for the Netherlands. During their first year they received 51 Volkswagen Beetles from Wolfsburg. The company also became an importer of Porsches in 1948.

A sketch made by Pon inspired the engineers at Volkswagen to develop the VW Type 2 Transporter (a van, commonly called the "VW Bus"), a vehicle that became a cultural icon for the Hippie generation of the 1960s.

In 1949, the first Beetle was shipped to the United States. Half a million were to follow by 1960. A mere two years later there were one million Beetles in the U.S. It has not been ascertained that Ben Pon was significantly involved in this success story, even though he was among the first to export them into the U.S. It cannot even be proved that he sold the first Beetle in the United States. He was, in fact, unable to find a partner for a distributorship and left the country with an unpaid hotel bill, but eventually it made him a multimillionaire and one of the richest people in the Netherlands.

In 1971, the dealership was separated from the export division and ran under the name of Pon Dealer. Audi later became a partner of Pon's. The business continued to grow, and in 1980 Pon's son, former Formula One racing driver Ben Pon, Jr. incorporated Pon Holdings, an exempt private company with approximately 9,000 employees.
