= Volkswagen Type 2 =

Volkswagen panel van

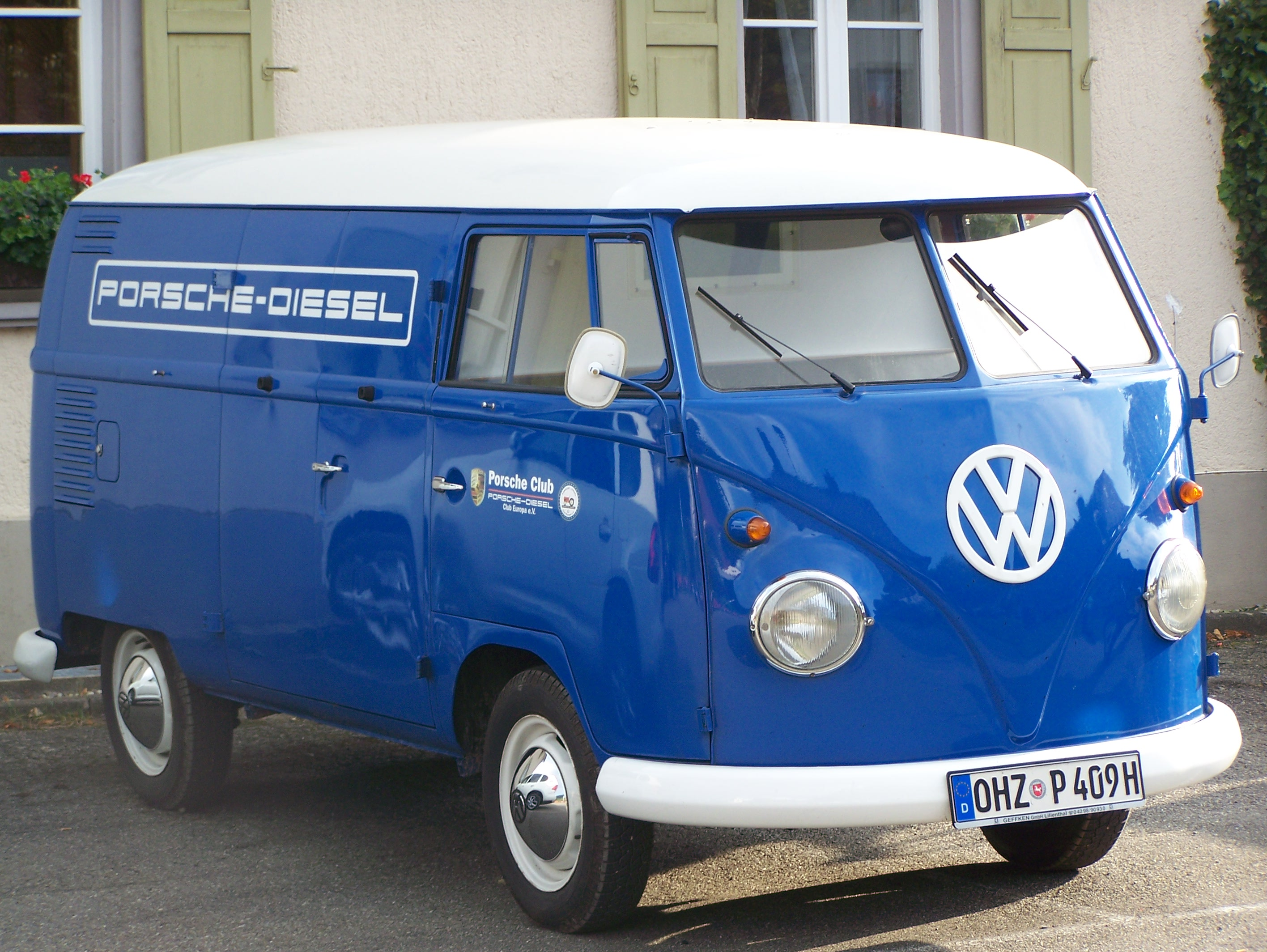

Overview
- Manufacturer: Volkswagen
- Also called: Volkswagen Bus; Volkswagen Kombi; Volkswagen Transporter
- Production: November 1949 – present

Body and chassis
- Class: Light commercial vehicle (M)
- Body style: 4/5-door panel van; 4/5-door minibus; 2-door pickup (regular cab); 3-door pickup (crew cab)
- Layout: Longitudinal Rear-engine, rear-wheel-drive (T1–T3); Longitudinal Rear-engine, four-wheel-drive (T3); Transverse Front-engine, front-wheel-drive (T4–present); Transverse Front-engine, four-wheel-drive (T4–present)
- Platform: Volkswagen Group T platform

Chronology
- Successor: Volkswagen ID. Buzz (Type 2 RWD)

The Volkswagen Transporter, initially the Type 2, is a range of light commercial vehicles, built as vans, pickups, and cab-and-chassis variants, introduced in 1950 by the German automaker Volkswagen. It was the company's second mass-production light motor vehicle series, and was inspired by an idea and request from Dutch VW importer Ben Pon.

Known officially (depending on body type) as the Transporter, Kombi or Microbus—or informally as the Volkswagen Station Wagon (US), Bus (also US), Camper (UK) or Bulli (Germany), it was initially given the factory designation "Type 2", as it followed—and was for decades based on—the original Volkswagen ("People's Car"), which became VW's "Type 1" after the company's post-World War II reboot, and mostly known, in many languages, as the "Beetle".

The Volkswagen Transporter has been built in many variants. It is best known for its panel vans, but it was also built as a small bus or minivan, with choices of up to 23 windows and either hinged or sliding side doors. From the first generation, both regular and crew-cab, as well as long- and short-bed pickups, were made, and multiple firms sprang up to manufacture varying designs of camper vans, based on VW's Transporter models, to this day.

For the first 40 years, all VW Type 2 variants were forward control, with a VW-Beetle-derived flat-four engine in the rear, and all riding on the same (initial thirty years—T1 and T2), or similar (T3), 2.40 m (94 in) wheelbase as the Type 1 Beetle. As a result, all forward-control Type 2 pickups were either of standard-cab, long-bed or crew-cab, short-bed configuration, and because of the relatively high bed floor (above the rear, flat engine), most pickups came with drop sides in addition to the tailgate. In 1979, the third-generation Type 2 introduced an all-new, more square and boxy body, and in the 1980s also introduced a raised four-wheel-drive bus variant.

With the introduction of the fourth-generation Transporter in 1990, the vehicle layout changed to a more common front-engined one—no longer forward-control—and also changed from rear- to front-wheel drive, with four-wheel–drive remaining optional. From then on, the platform no longer shared technological legacy with the Beetle, and Volkswagen just called them the Transporter rather than the Type 2. The new models, though growing a bit in length, got a significantly longer wheelbase that pushed the wheels closer to the truck's corners, noticeably reducing its front and rear overhangs, and extended-wheelbase models were also introduced.

== Legacy of the Type 2 ==
As one of the forerunners of the modern cargo and passenger vans, the Type 2 gave rise to forward control competitors in the United States during the 1960s, including the Ford Econoline, the Dodge A100, and the Chevrolet Corvair 95 Corvan—the last adapting the rear-engine configuration of the Corvair car in the same manner in which the VW Type 2 adapted the Type 1's layout.

European competition included the 1947–1981 Citroën H Van, the 1959–1980 Renault Estafette (both FF layout), the 1952–1969 semi-forward-control Bedford CA and the 1953–1965 FR layout Ford Transit. Japanese manufacturers also introduced similar vehicles such as the Nissan Caravan, Toyota LiteAce and Subaru Sambar. Like the Beetle, the van has received numerous nicknames worldwide, including "microbus", "minibus", and, because of its popularity in the counterculture movement of the 1960s and 1970s, "hippie van" and "hippie bus".

Brazil contained the last factory in the world that produced the T2 series of Type 2, which ceased production on 31 December 2013 due to the introduction of more stringent safety regulations in the country. This (after the 2002 termination of its T3 successor in South Africa) marked the end of the era of rear-engine Volkswagens, which originated in 1935 with their Type 1 prototypes.

== History ==
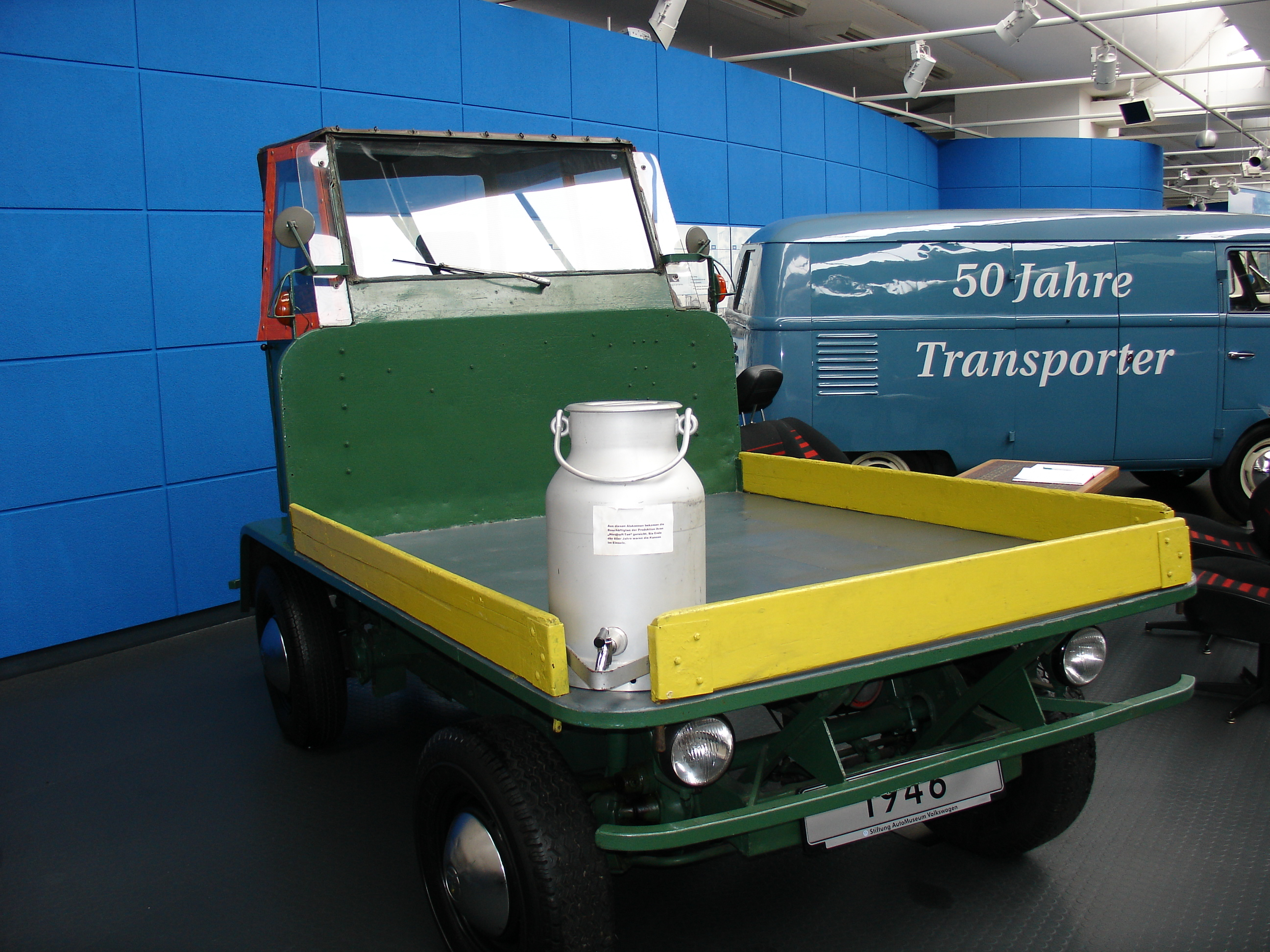
Plattenwagen

The concept for the Type 2 is credited to Dutch Volkswagen importer Ben Pon. It has similarities in concept to the 1920s Rumpler Tropfenwagen and 1930s Dymaxion car by Buckminster Fuller, neither of which reached production. Pon visited Wolfsburg in 1946, intending to purchase Type 1s for import to the Netherlands, where he saw a Plattenwagen, an improvised parts-mover based on the Type 1 chassis, and realized something better was possible using the stock Type 1 pan. He first sketched the van in a doodle dated 23 April 1947, proposing a payload of 690 kg (1,520 lb) and placing the driver at the very front. Said sketch is now on display at the Rijksmuseum. Production would have to wait, however, as the Volkswagen factory was at capacity producing the Type 1.

When capacity freed up, a prototype known internally as the Type 29 was produced in a short three months. The stock Type 1 pan proved to be too weak, so the prototype used a ladder chassis with unit body construction. Coincidentally, the wheelbase was the same as the Type 1's. Engineers reused the reduction gear from the Type 82, enabling the 1.5 ton van to use a 25 hp (19 kW) flat four engine.

Although the aerodynamics of the first prototypes were poor (with an initial drag coefficient of Cd=0.75), engineers used the wind tunnel at the Technical University of Braunschweig to optimize the design. Simple changes such as splitting the windshield and roofline into a "vee" helped the production Type 2 achieve Cd=0.44, exceeding the Type 1's Cd=0.48. Volkswagen's new chief executive officer Heinz Nordhoff (appointed on 1 January 1948) approved the van for production on 19 May 1949, and the first production model, now designated Type 2, rolled off the assembly line to debut on 12 November. Only two models were offered: the Kombi (with two side windows and middle and rear seats that were easily removable by one person) and the Commercial. The Microbus was added in May 1950, joined by the Deluxe Microbus in June 1951. In all 9,541 Type 2s were produced in their first year of production.

An ambulance model was added in December 1951, which repositioned the fuel tank in front of the transaxle, put the spare tire behind the front seat, and added a "tailgate"-style rear door. These features became standard on the Type 2 from 1955 to 1967. 11,805 Type 2s were built in the 1951 model year. These were joined by a single-cab pickup in August 1952, and it changed the least of the Type 2s until all were heavily modified in 1968.

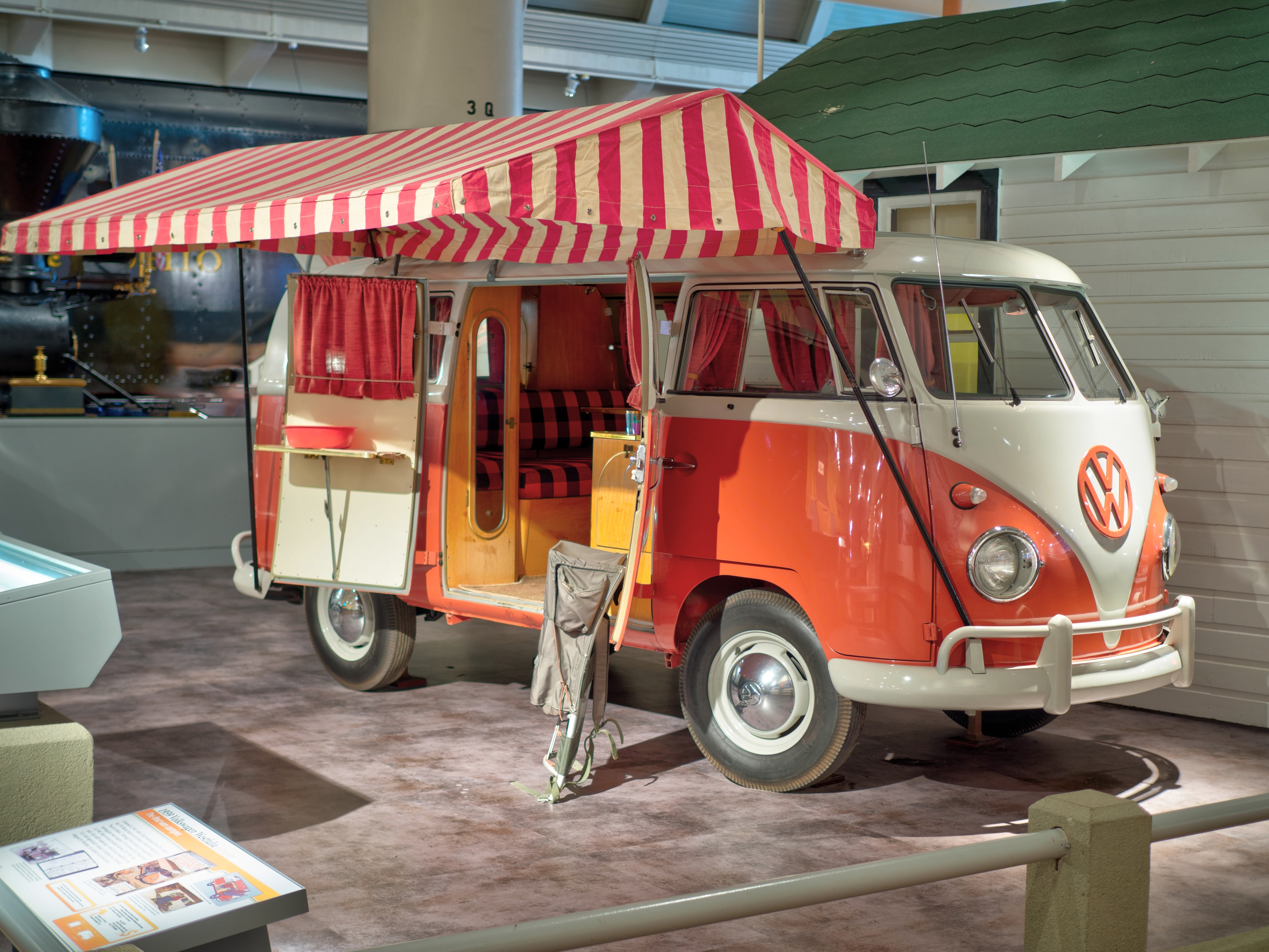
1959 Volkswagen Westfalia Camper at The Henry Ford

Unlike other rear engine Volkswagens, which evolved constantly over time but never saw the introduction of all-new models, the Transporter not only evolved, but was completely revised periodically, with variations retrospectively referred to as versions "T1" to "T5" (a nomenclature only invented after the introduction of the front-drive T4 which replaced the T3). However, only generations T1 to T3 can be seen as directly related to the Beetle (see below for details).

The Type 2, along with the 1939 Citroën TUB and the 1947 Citroën H Van, are among the first "forward control" vans in which the driver was placed above the front roadwheels. They started a trend in Europe where the 1952 GM Bedford CA, 1958 RAF-977, 1959 Renault Estafette, 1960 BMC Morris J4, and 1960 Commer FC also used the concept. In the United States, the Corvair-based Chevrolet Corvan cargo van and Greenbrier passenger van adopted the use of the rear-engine layout of the Corvair car in the same manner that the Type 2 had used the rear-engine layout of the Type 1, using the Corvair's horizontally opposed, six-cylinder air-cooled engine for power. Except for the Greenbrier, various 1950s–70s Fiat minivans, and the Mazda Bongo, the Type 2 remained unique in being rear-engined. This was a disadvantage for the early "barndoor" Panel Vans, which could not easily be loaded from the rear because the engine cover intruded on interior space, but generally advantageous in traction and interior noise. The Corvair pickup used a folding side panel that functioned as a ramp into the bed when opened, and was called the "Rampside". The VW "pickup" in both single and double cab versions had a bed/floor that was flat from front to back at the height of the engine compartment cover, which had the advantage of a flat load floor but at a greater height, while the Corvair "pickup" bed/floor stepped down in front of the engine compartment to a much lower load floor which worked well with the unique "Rampside" configuration for loading.

In 2017, decades after production of the Type 2 ended, Volkswagen announced the introduction of an electric VW microbus based on the new MEB platform in 2022.

== Variants ==
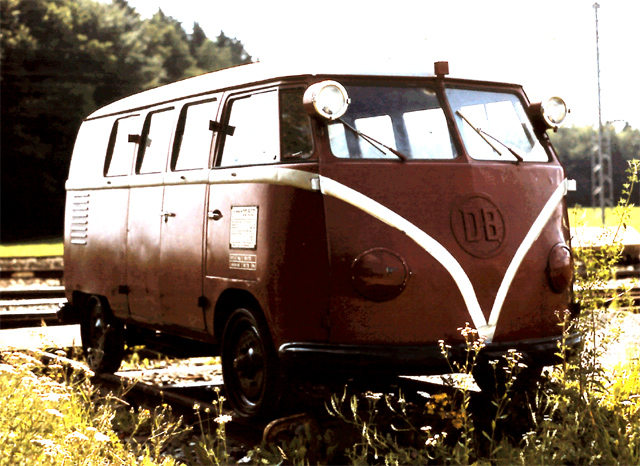
Rail-going draisine

The Type 2 was available as a:

- Panel van, a delivery van without side windows or rear seats.
- Double-door Panel Van, a delivery van without side windows or rear seats and cargo doors on both sides.
- High Roof Panel Van (German: Hochdach), a delivery van with raised roof.
- Kombi, from German: Kombinationskraftwagen (combination motor vehicle), with side windows and removable rear seats, both a passenger and a cargo vehicle combined.
- Bus, also called a Volkswagen Caravelle, a van with more comfortable interior reminiscent of passenger cars since the third generation.
- Lotação (share taxi), a version exclusive to Brazil, with six front-hinged doors for the passenger area and four bench-seats, catering to the supplemental public transport segment. Available from 1960 to 1989 in both the split-window and "clipper" (fitted with the bay-window front panel) bodystyles.
- Samba-Bus, a van with skylight windows and cloth sunroof, first generation only, also known as a Deluxe Microbus. They were marketed for touring the Alps.
- Flatbed pickup truck, or Single Cab, also available with wider load bed.
- Crew cab pick-up, a flatbed truck with extended cab and two rows of seats, also called a Doka, from German: Doppelkabine.
- Westfalia camping van, "Westy", with Westfalia roof and interior. Included optional "pop up" top.
- Adventurewagen camping van, with high roof and camping units from Adventurewagen.
- Semi-camping van that can also still be used as a passenger car and transporter, sacrificing some camping comforts. "Multivan" or "Weekender", available from the third generation on.

Apart from these factory variants, there were a multitude of third-party conversions available, some of which were offered through Volkswagen dealers. They included, but were not limited to, refrigerated vans, hearses, ambulances, police vans, fire engines and ladder trucks, and camping van conversions by companies other than Westfalia. There were even 30 Klv 20 rail-going draisines built for Deutsche Bundesbahn in 1955.

In South Africa, it is known as a variation of the ice cream van (first, second, and third generations).

== First generation (T1; 1950) ==
Volkswagen Type 2 (T1)
- 1961 Volkswagen Type 2

Overview
- Manufacturer: Volkswagen
- Production: 1950–1967 (Europe); 1953–1975 (Brazil)
- Assembly: West Germany: Wolfsburg; West Germany: Hanover; Australia: Melbourne; Brazil: São Bernardo do Campo; South Africa: Uitenhage

Body and chassis
- Class: Light commercial vehicle/Full-size van (M)
- Body style: 4-/5-door panel van/panel truck; 4-/5-door minibus; 2-door pickup (regular cab); 3-door pickup (crew cab)
- Layout: RR layout
- Platform: Volkswagen Group T1 platform

Powertrain
- Engine: 1.1 L B4 (petrol); 1.2 L B4 (petrol); 1.5 L B4 (petrol); 1.6 L B4 (petrol) (Brazil, after 1967)

Dimensions
- Wheelbase: 2,400 mm (94.5 in)
- Length: 4,280 mm (168.5 in)
- Width: 1,720 mm (67.7 in)
- Height: 1,940 mm (76.4 in)

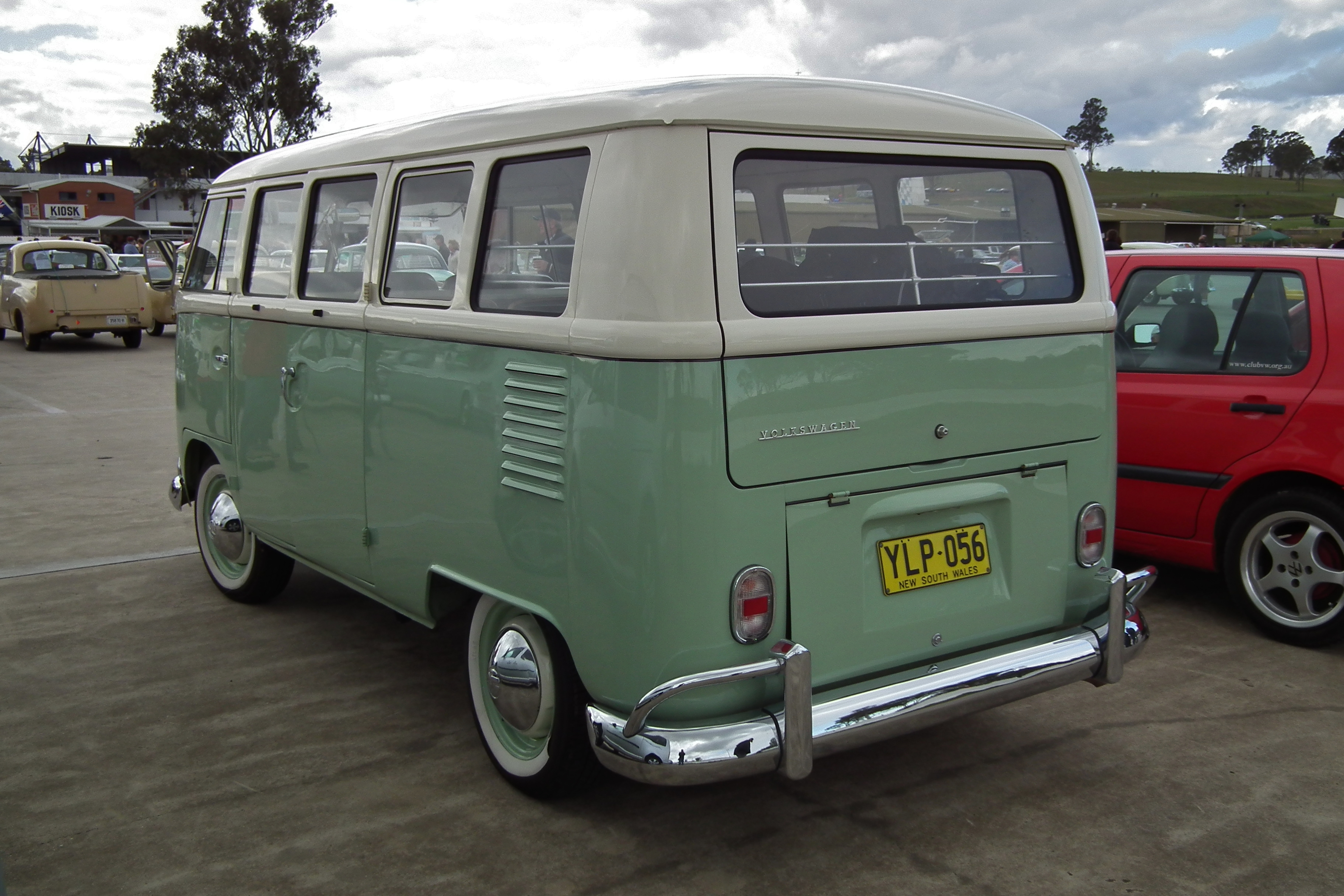
VW T1, 13-window "Kombi" bus

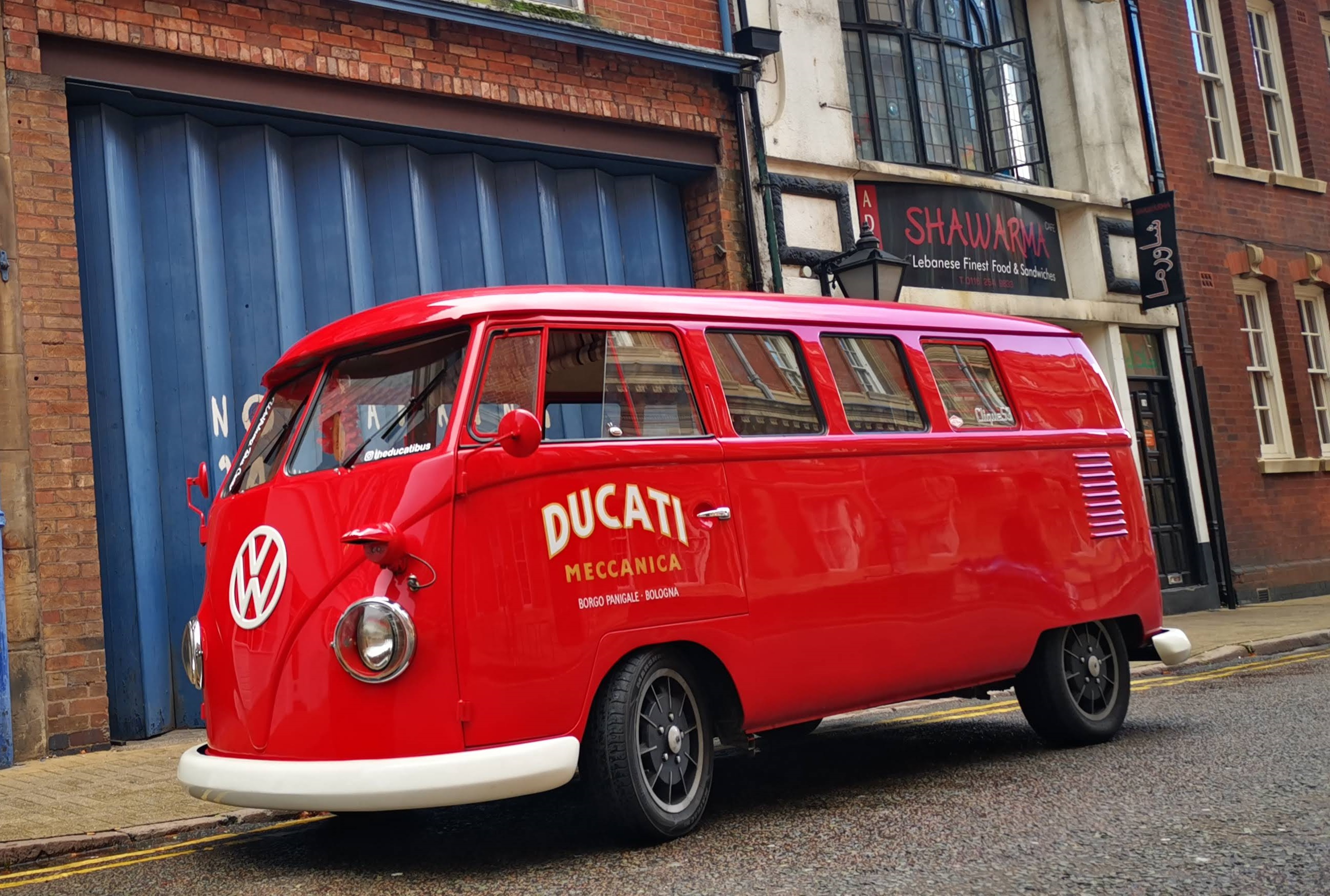
VW T1, 11-window "Kombi" bus

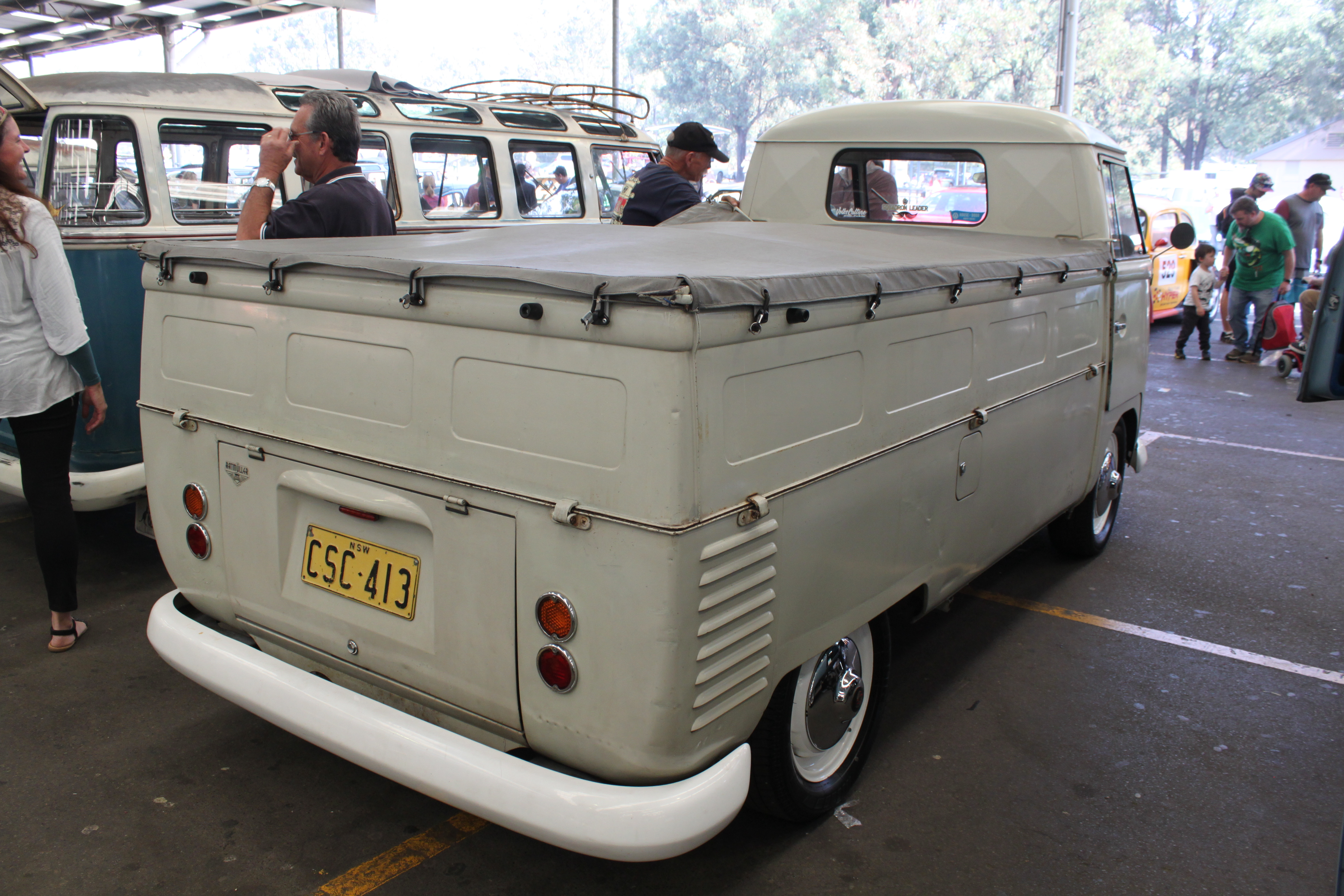
VW T1, single-cab utility pickup

The first generation of the Volkswagen Type 2 with the split windshield, informally called the Microbus, Splitscreen, or Splittie among modern fans, was produced from 8 March 1950 until the end of the 1967 model year. From 1950 to 1956, the T1 (not called that at the time) was built in Wolfsburg; from 1956 to 1967, it was built at the new Transporter factory in Hanover. Like the Beetle, the first Transporters used the 1100 Volkswagen air-cooled engine, a 1,131 cc (69.0 cu in), DIN-rated 25 PS (18.4 kW; 24.7 bhp), air-cooled flat-four-cylinder "boxer" engine mounted in the rear. This was upgraded to the 1200 – a 1,192 cc (72.7 cu in) 30 PS (22.1 kW; 29.6 bhp) unit in 1953. A higher compression ratio became standard in 1955; while an unusual early version of the 34 PS (25.0 kW; 33.5 bhp) engine debuted exclusively on the Type 2 in 1959. Any 1959 models that retain that early engine today are rare. Since the engine was discontinued almost immediately, no spare parts were made available.

The early versions of the T1 until 1955 were often called the "Barndoor" (retrospectively called T1a since the 1990s), owing to the enormous rear engine cover, while the later versions with a slightly modified body (the roofline above the windshield is extended), smaller engine bay, and 15" roadwheels instead of the original 16" ones are nowadays called the T1b (again, only called this since the 1990s, based on VW's retrospective T1, 2, 3, 4 etc. naming system). From the 1964 model year onwards, when the rear door was made wider (same as on the bay-window or T2), the vehicle could be referred to as the T1c. That year also saw the introduction of an optional sliding door for the passenger/cargo area instead of the outwardly hinged doors typical of cargo vans.

In 1962, a heavy-duty Transporter was introduced as a factory option. It featured a cargo capacity of 1,000 kg (2,205 lb) instead of the previous 750 kg (1,653 lb), smaller but wider 14" roadwheels, and a 1.5 L, 42 PS (30.9 kW; 41.4 bhp) DIN engine. This was so successful that only a year later, the 750 kg, 1.2 L Transporter was discontinued. The 1963 model year introduced the 1500 engine – 1,493 cc (91.1 cu in) as standard equipment to the US market at 38 kW (52 PS; 51 bhp) DIN with an 83 mm (3.27 in) bore, 69 mm (2.72 in) stroke, and 7.8:1 compression ratio. When the Beetle received the 1.5 L engine for the 1967 model year, its power was increased to 40 kW (54 PS; 54 bhp) DIN.

German production on the T1 stopped after the 1967 model year; however, the T1 still was made in Brazil until 1975, when it was modified with a 1968–79 T2-style front end, and big 1972-vintage taillights into the so-called "T1.5" and produced until 1996. The Brazilian T1s were not identical to the last German models (the T1.5 was locally produced in Brazil using the 1950s and 1960s-era stamping dies to cut down on retooling, alongside the Beetle/Fusca, where the pre-1965 body style was retained), though they sported some characteristic features of the T1a, such as the cargo doors and five-stud 205 mm (8.1 in) Pitch Circle Diameter rims. Wheel tracks varied between German and Brazilian production and with 14-inch, 15-inch and 16-inch wheel variants but commonly front track varied from 1290 mm to 1310 mm and rear track from 1370 mm to 1390 mm.

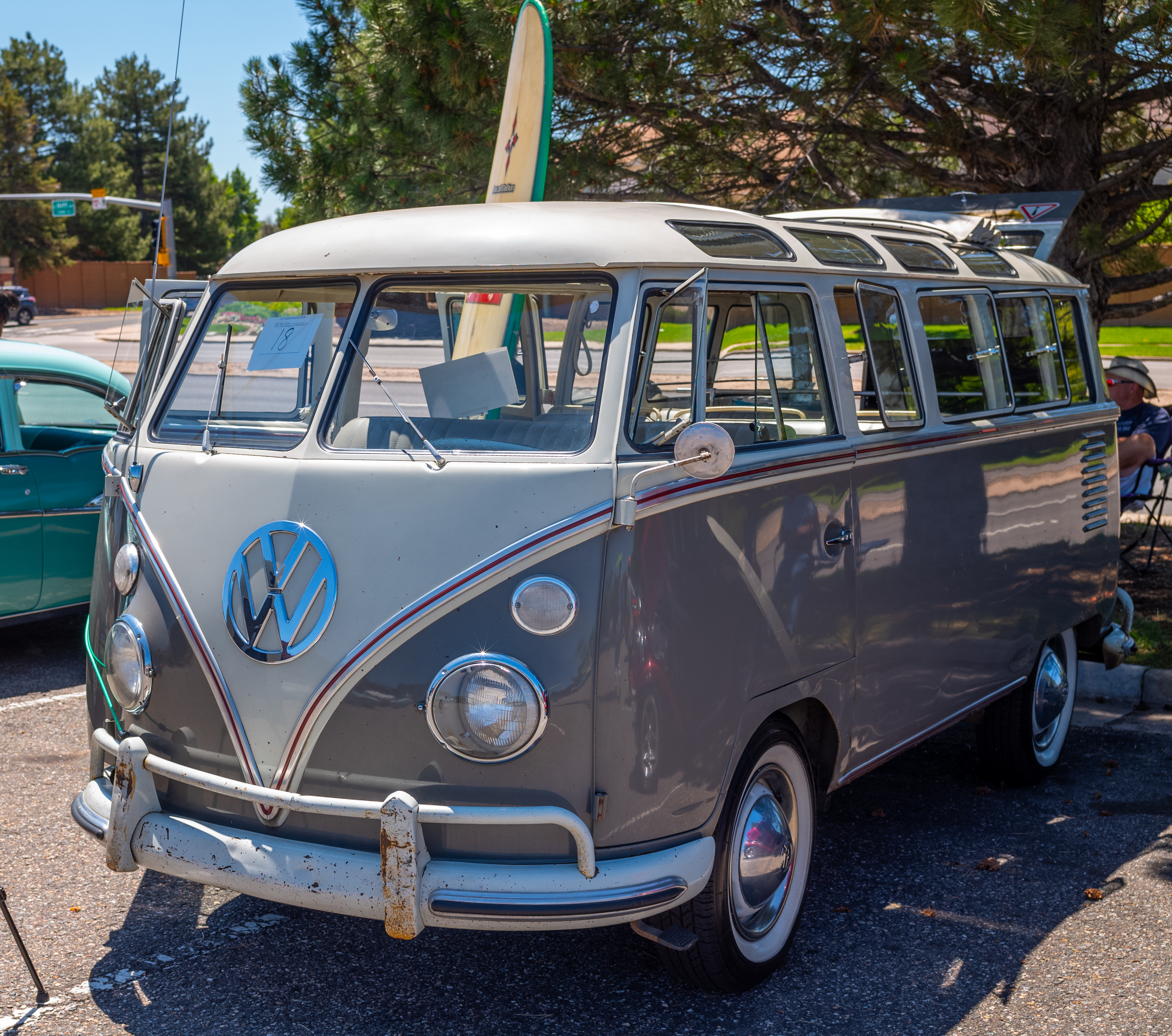
1962 VW 23 Window Deluxe Microbus

Among North American enthusiasts, it is common to refer to the different models by the number of their windows. The basic Kombi or Bus is the 11-window (a.k.a. three-window bus because of three side windows) with a split windshield, two front cabin door windows, six rear side windows, and one rear window. The DeLuxe model featured eight rear side windows and two rear corner windows, making it the 15-window (not available in Europe). Meanwhile, the sunroof DeLuxe with its additional eight small skylight windows is, accordingly, the 23-window. For the 1964 model year, with its wider rear door, the rear corner windows were discontinued, making the latter two the 13-window and 21-window respectively. The 23- and later 21-window variants each carry the nickname "Samba" or in Australia, officially "Alpine".

=== Samba ===
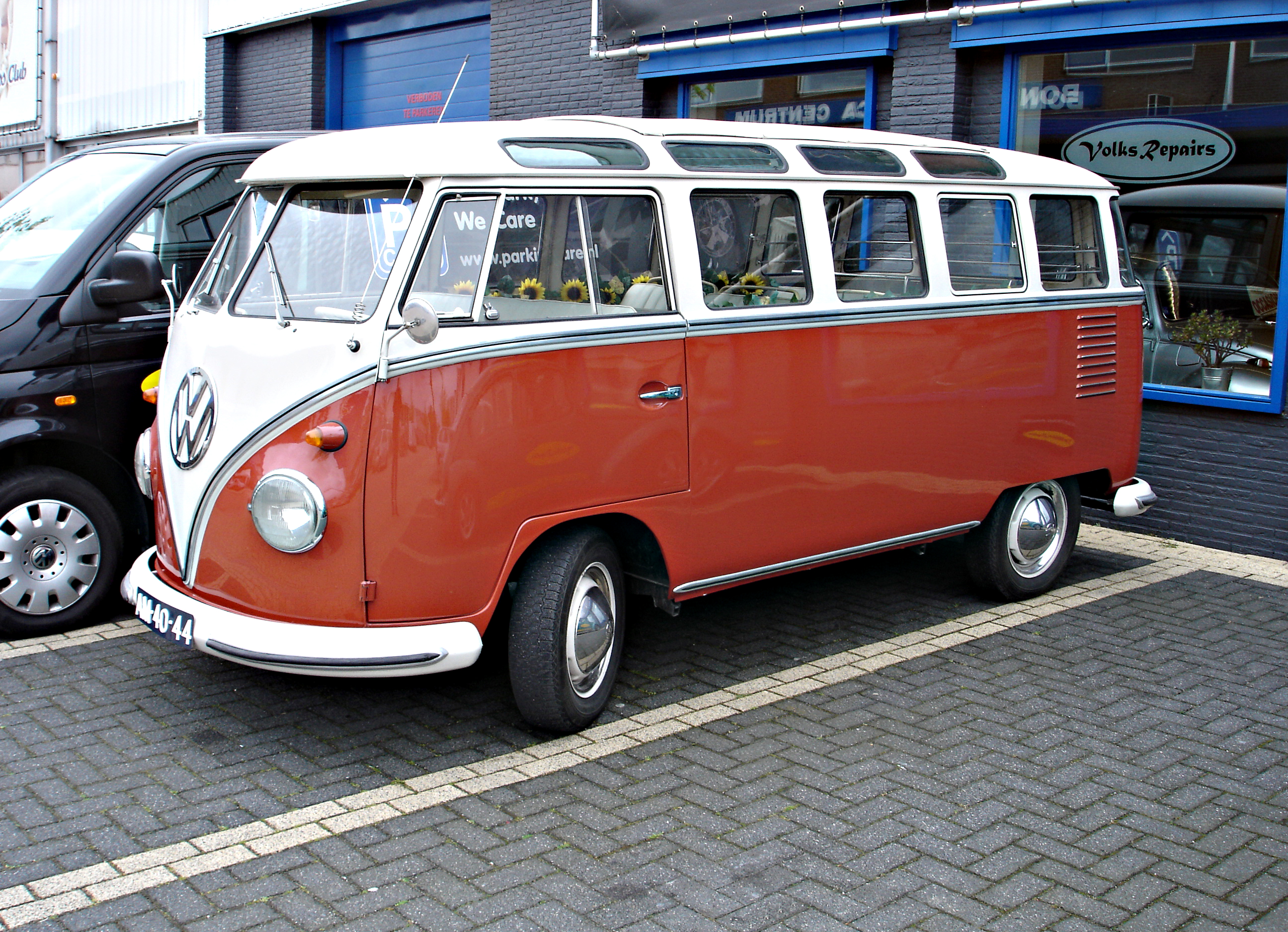
Red VW 23-window Samba bus

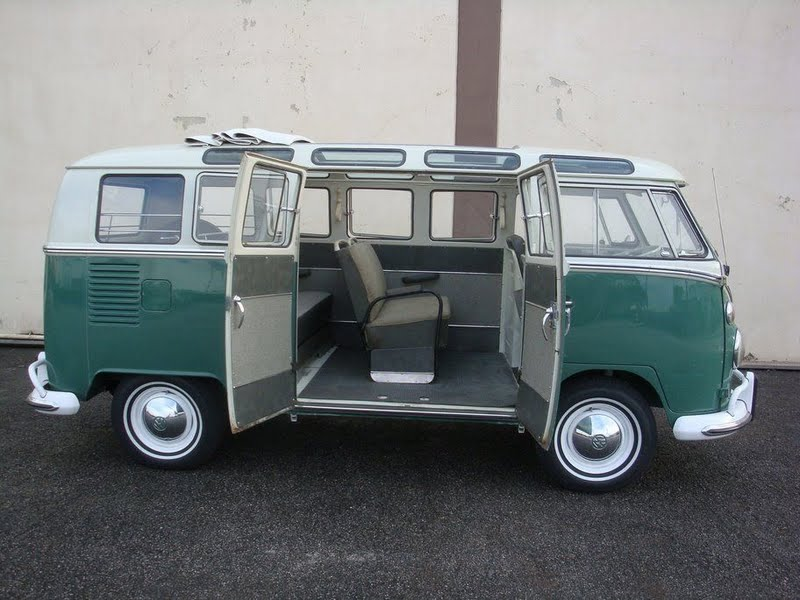
VW T1, 21-window Transporter Samba model

The Volkswagen "Samba", officially the Kleinbus Sonderausführung (small bus, special version) and marketed as the Microbus Deluxe and Sunroof Deluxe in the United States, was the most luxurious version of the T1. Volkswagen started producing Sambas in 1951; the name in the home market was changed to Sondermodell (special model) in 1952. The precise origin of the Samba nickname is unclear: some sources refer to "samba cars", special train cars for dancing used by the Bundesbahn in the 1950s, while others suggest that it is an abbreviation for either Sonder-Ausführung mit besonderer Ausstattung (special version with special equipment) or for Sonnendach-Ausführung mit besonderem Armaturenbrett (sunroof version with special dashboard). The Samba name first appeared in official literature in Dutch price lists.

In the US, Volkswagen vans were informally identified by the window count. This particular model had 23 and later 21 windows, including eight high windows in the roof. The 23-window variant also had curved windows in the rear corners.

The Samba had bi-parting doors in lieu of a sliding door, and could be ordered with a large fabric sunroof. Volkswagen advertised the Samba for making tourist trips through the Alps.

Standard paint finishes on the Samba were two-tone, usually with the upper bodywork in white. The lower bodywork carried a contrasting color, the areas separated by a decorative strip. The roof carried slightly forward of the windshield at the front, creating an integral visor. The windows had chrome tables and the van had a more comprehensive dashboard than the normal T1.

When Volkswagen started producing the successor of the T1 (the T2), the company also stopped producing the Samba, ending the Samba and the concept of a van with such a high window count.

=== US Chicken tax ===
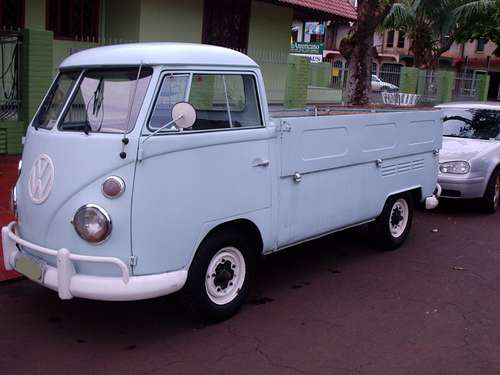
US sales of Volkswagen vans in pickup and commercial configurations were curtailed by the chicken tax.

Certain models of the Volkswagen Type 2 played a role in a historic episode during the early 1960s known as the Chicken War. France and West Germany had placed tariffs on imports of US chicken. Diplomacy failed, and in January 1964, two months after taking office, President Lyndon B. Johnson imposed a 25% tax (almost ten times the average US tariff) on potato starch, dextrin, brandy, and light trucks. Officially, the tax targeted items imported from Europe as approximating the value of lost American chicken sales to Europe.

In retrospect, audio tapes from the Johnson White House revealed a quid pro quo unrelated to chicken. In January 1964, Johnson attempted to convince United Auto Workers president Walter Reuther not to initiate a strike just before the 1964 election, and to support the president's civil rights platform. Reuther, in turn, wanted Johnson to respond to Volkswagen's increased shipments to the United States.

The Chicken Tax directly curtailed importation of German-built Type 2s in configurations that qualified them as light trucks – that is, commercial vans (panel vans) and pickups; vans imported in passenger configuration were not affected. In 1964, US imports of trucks from West Germany declined to a value of $5.7 million – about a third of the value imported in the previous year. After 1971, Volkswagen cargo vans and pickup trucks, the intended targets, practically disappeared from the US market. While post-1971 Type 2 commercial vans and single-cab and double-cab pickups can be found in the United States today, they are exceedingly rare. Any post-1971 specimen found ostensibly has had its import tariff paid. The "Chicken tax" remains in effect today, even though it is now commonly circumvented by converting passenger vehicles to utility vehicles after they have entered the US, a form of tariff engineering. This practice is ironically exercised by Ford (for its Transit Connect van), one of the companies the tax was meant to protect.

== Second generation (T2; 1967) ==
Volkswagen Type 2 (T2)
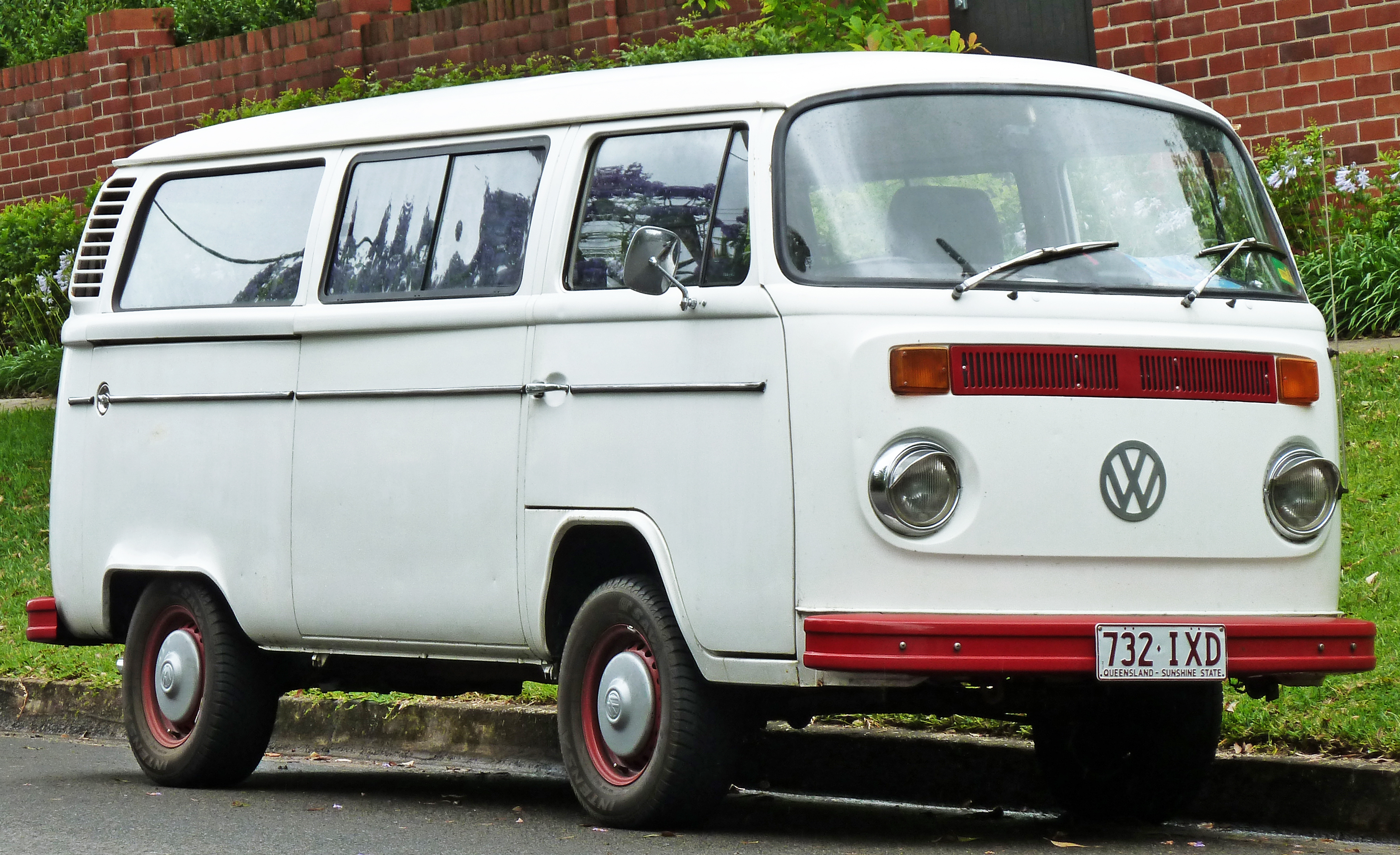

Overview
- Production: August 1967 – July 1979 (Europe); 1968–1994 (Mexico); 1976 – December 2013 (Brazil); 1980–1986 (Argentina)
- Assembly: West Germany: Hannover; West Germany: Emden; Argentina: General Pacheco; Australia: Clayton; Brazil: São Bernardo do Campo; Mexico: Puebla; South Africa: Uitenhage

Body and chassis
- Class: Light commercial vehicle (M)
- Body style: 4-door panel van/panel truck; 4-door minibus; 2-door pickup (regular cab); 3-door pickup (crew cab)
- Layout: RR layout
- Platform: Volkswagen Group T2 platform

Powertrain
- Engine: 1.6 L B4 (petrol); 1.7 L B4 (petrol); 1.8 L B4 (petrol); 1.8 L I4 (petrol); 2.0 L B4 (petrol)
- Transmission: 4-speed manual; 3-speed automatic

Dimensions
- Wheelbase: 2,400 mm (94.5 in)
- Length: 4,505 mm (177.4 in)
- Width: 1,720 mm (67.7 in)
- Height: 1,940 mm (76.4 in)

Chronology
- Successor: Volkswagen Type 2 (T3)

In late 1967, the second generation of the Volkswagen Type 2 (T2) was introduced. It was built in West Germany until 1979. In Mexico, the Volkswagen Kombi and Panel were produced from 1970 to 1994. Early models are often called the T2a (or "Early Bay"), models after 1971 are called the T2b (or "Late Bay") and models after 1991 are called the T2c.

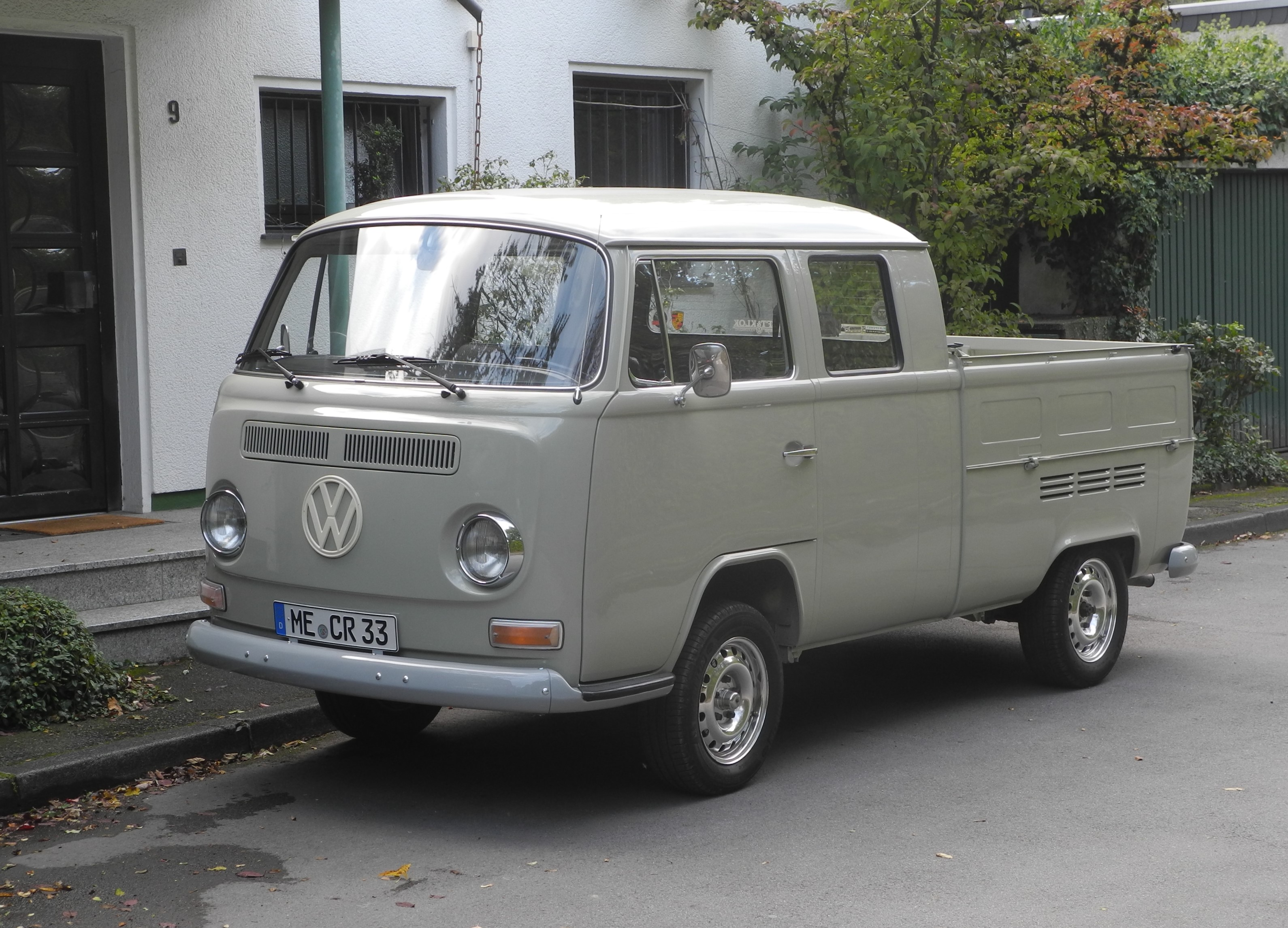
VW T2a/b crew-cab pickup

This second-generation Type 2 lost its distinctive split front windshield, and was 22.5 cm (9 in) longer and considerably heavier than its predecessor. Its common nicknames are "Breadloaf" and "Bay-window", or "Loaf" and "Bay" for short. At 1.6 L and 35 kW (48 PS; 47 bhp) DIN, the engine was also slightly larger. The battery and electrical system was upgraded to 12 volts, making it incompatible with electric accessories from the previous generation. The new model eliminated the swing axle rear suspension and transfer boxes previously used to raise ride height. Instead, half-shaft axles fitted with constant velocity joints raised ride height without the wild changes in camber of the Beetle-based swing axle suspension. The updated Bus transaxle is sought by off-road racers using air-cooled Volkswagen components.

=== T2b ===
The T2b was introduced by way of gradual change over three years. The first models featured rounded bumpers incorporating a step for use when the door was open (replaced by indented bumpers without steps on later models), front doors that opened to 90° from the body, no lip on the front guards, unique engine hatches, and crescent air intakes in the D-pillars (later models after the Type 4 engine option was offered, have squared off intakes). The 1971 Type 2 featured a new, 1.6 L engine with dual intake ports on each cylinder head and was DIN-rated at 37 kW (50 PS; 50 bhp). An important change came with the introduction of front disc brakes and new roadwheels with brake ventilation holes and flatter hubcaps. Until 1972, front indicators are set low on the nose rather than high on either side of the fresh air grille – giving rise to their being nicknamed "Low Lights". 1972's most prominent change was a bigger engine compartment to fit the larger 1.7- to 2.0-liter engines from the Type 4, and a redesigned rear end which eliminated the removable rear apron and introduced the larger late tail lights. The air inlets were also enlarged to accommodate the increased cooling air needs of the larger engines.

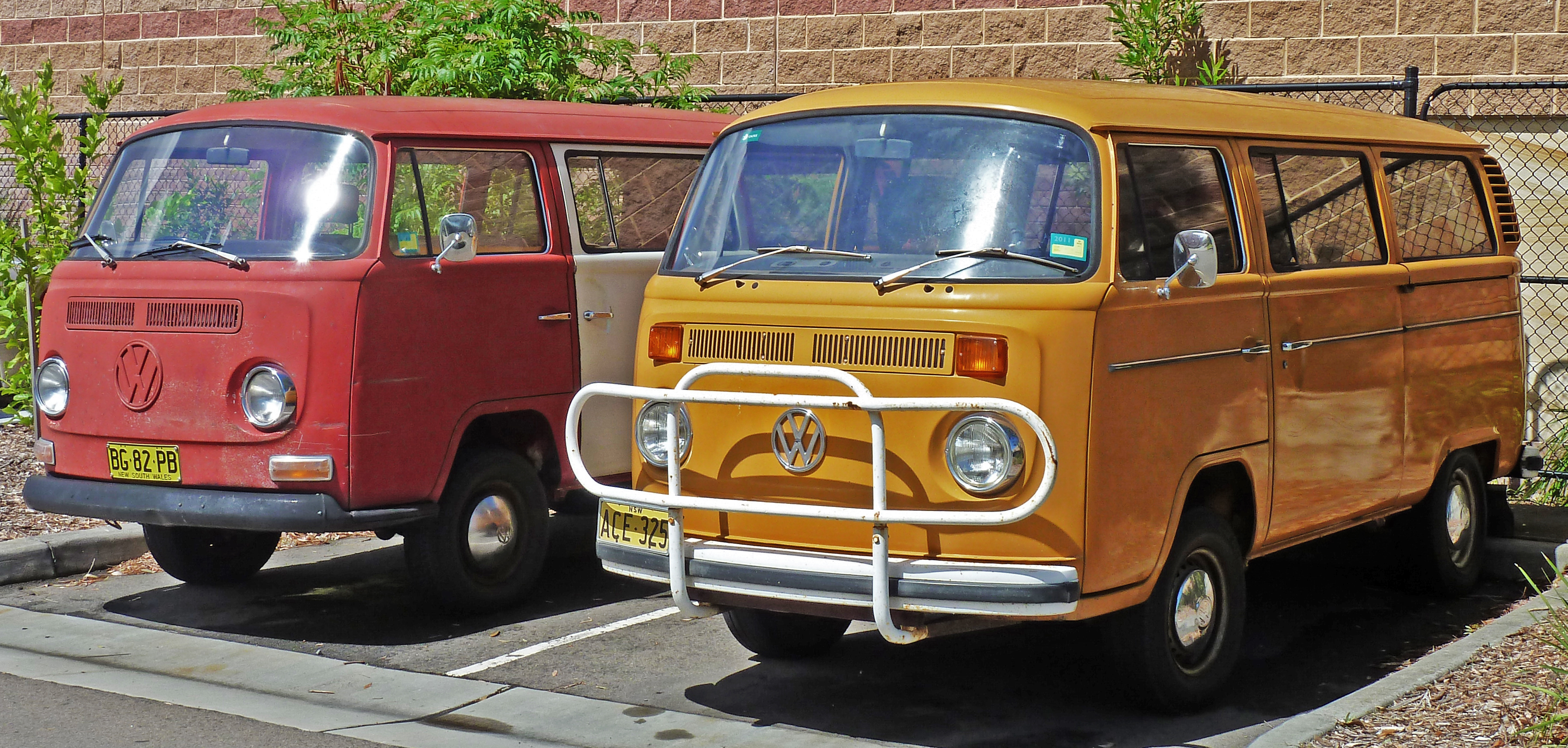
Pre-facelift (left) and facelifted (right) Volkswagen Kombi (T2) vans (Australia)

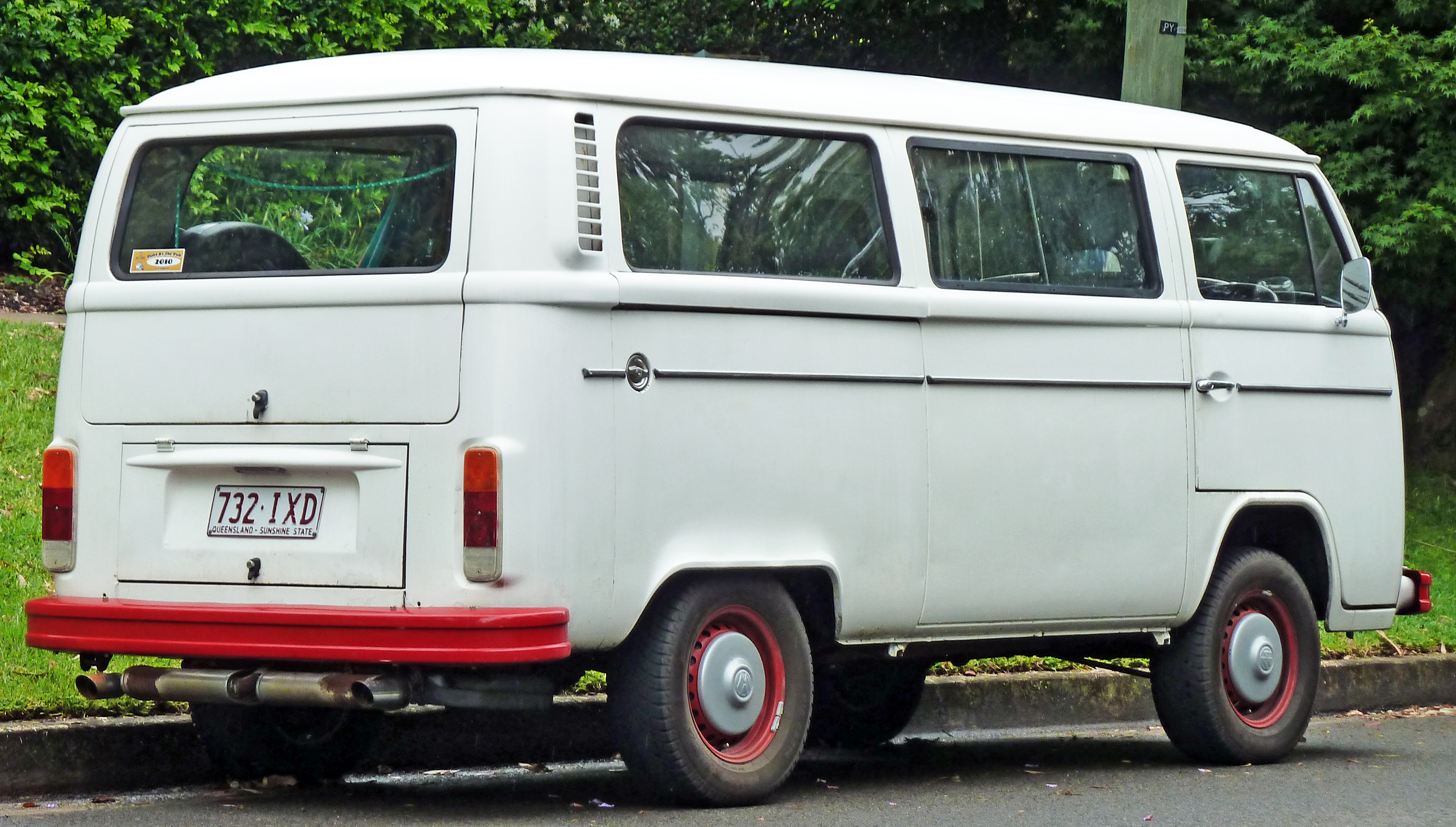
1973–1980 Volkswagen Kombi (T2) van (Australia)

In 1971, the 1600 cc Type 1 engine as used in the Beetle, was supplemented with the 1700 cc Type 4 engine – as it was originally designed for the Type 4 (411 and 412) models. European vans kept the option of upright fan Type 1 1600 engine, but the 1700 Type 4 became standard for US spec models.

In the Type 2, the Type 4 engine, or "pancake engine", was an option for the 1972 model year onward. This engine was standard in models destined for the US and Canada. Only with the Type 4 engine did an automatic transmission become available for the first time in the 1973 model year. Both engines were 1.7 L, DIN-rated at 49 kW (67 PS; 66 bhp) with the manual transmission and 46 kW (63 PS; 62 bhp) with the automatic. The Type 4 engine was enlarged to 1.8 L and 50 kW (68 PS; 67 bhp) DIN for the 1974 model year and again to 2.0 L and 52 kW (71 PS; 70 bhp) DIN for the 1976 model year. The two-liter option appeared in South African manufactured models during 1976, originally only in a comparably well-equipped "Executive" model. The 1978 2.0 L now featured hydraulic valve lifters, eliminating the need to periodically adjust the valve clearances as on earlier models. The 1975 and later US model years received Bosch L-Jetronic electronic fuel injection as standard equipment. 1978 was the first year for electronic ignition, using a hall effect sensor and digital controller, eliminating maintenance-requiring contact-breaker points. As with all Transporter engines, the focus in development was not on power, but on low-end torque. The Type 4 engines were considerably more robust and durable than the Type 1 engines, particularly in Transporter service.

For the 1973 model year, exterior revisions included relocated front turn indicators, squared off and set higher in the valance, above the headlights. Also, square-profiled bumpers, which became standard until the end of the T2 in 1979, were introduced in 1973. Crash safety improved with this change because of a compressible structure behind the front bumper. This meant that the T2b was capable of meeting US safety standards for passenger cars of the time, though not required of vans. The "VW" emblem on the front valance also became slightly smaller.

Later model changes were primarily mechanical. By 1974, the T2 had gained its final shape. Very late in the T2's design life, during the late 1970s, the first prototypes of Type 2 vans with four-wheel drive (4WD) were built and tested.

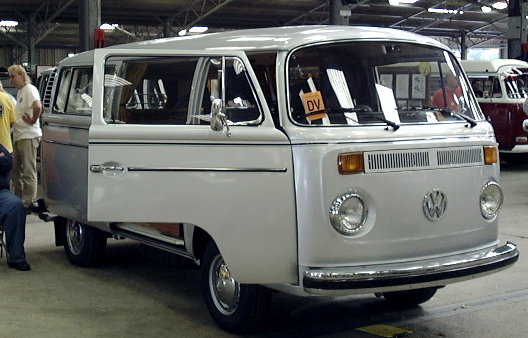
1979 Volkswagen Type 2 (T2) "Silverfish" last-edition bus. These were a limited-edition model to mark the final production of T2 models in Europe

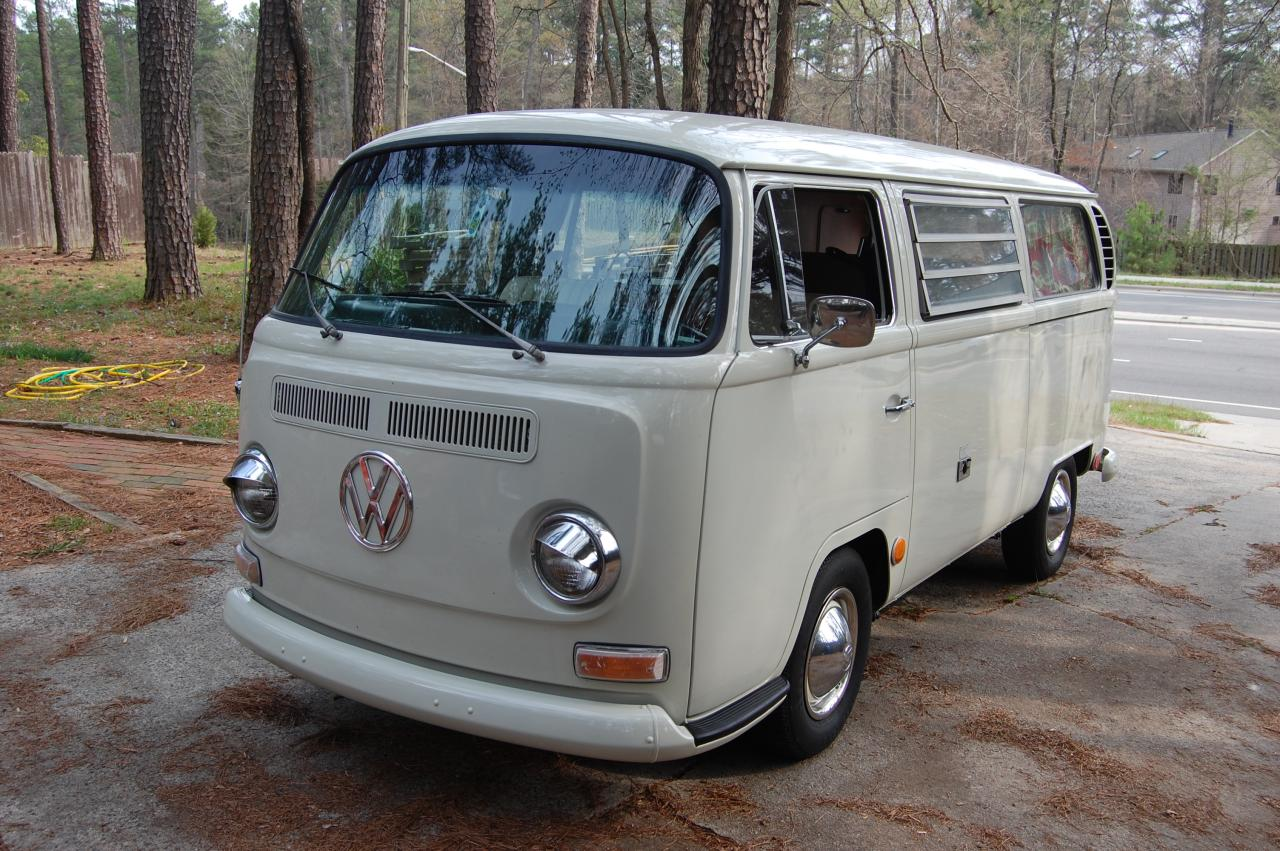
1968 Volkswagen Type 2 (T2) Hard-Top Westfalia "Cream" bus

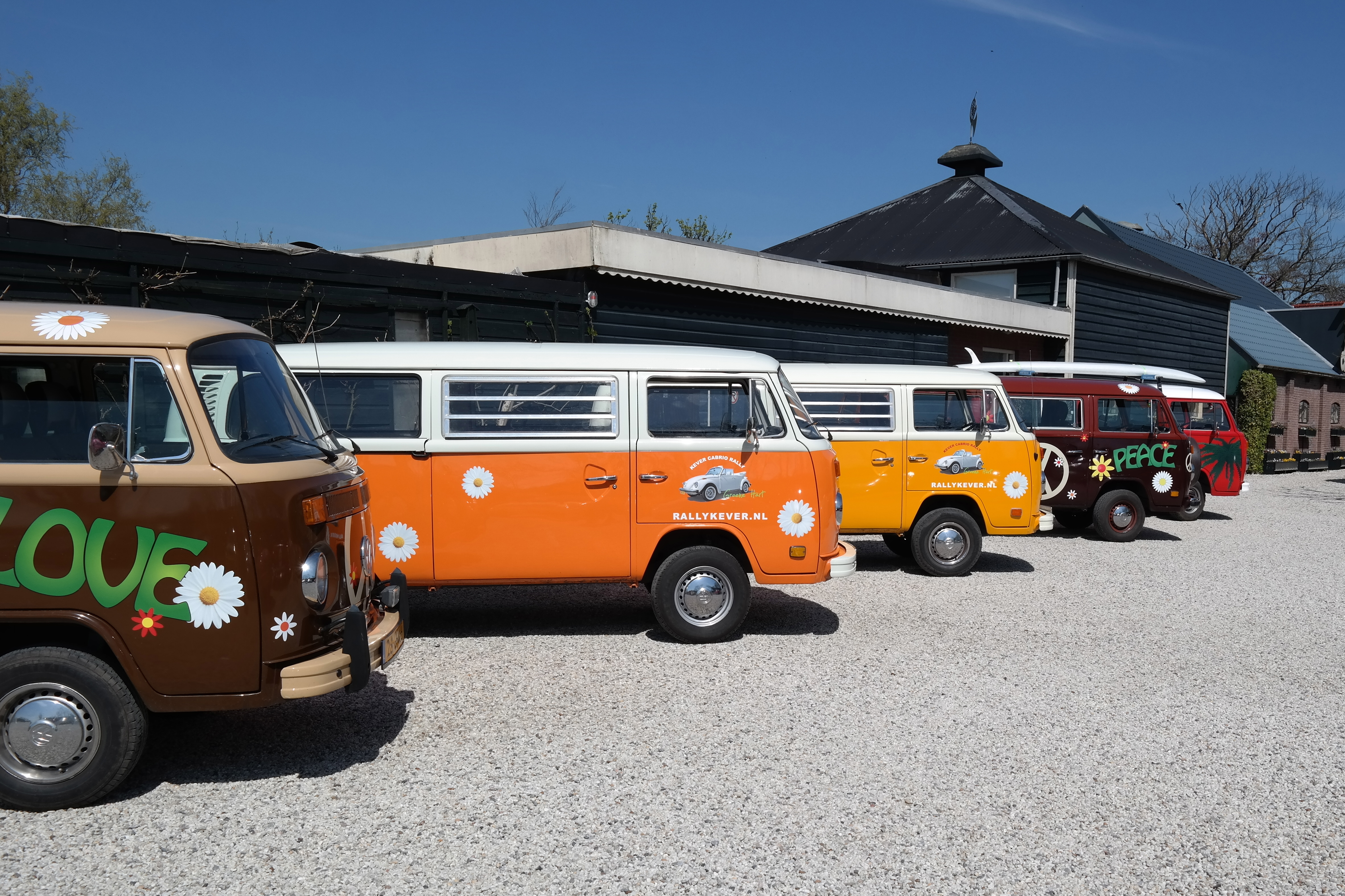
Restored T2 models with body painted in flower power style

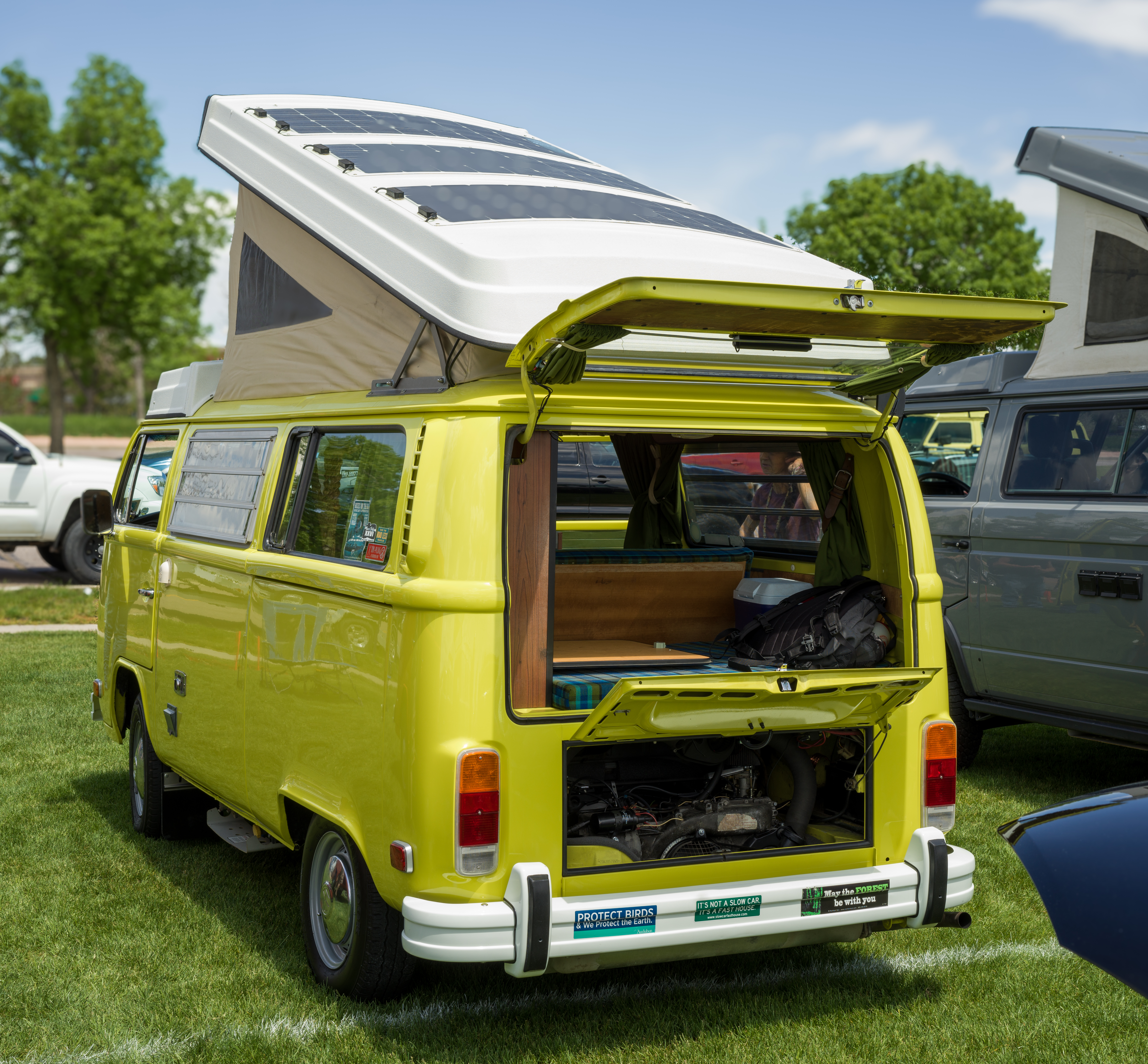
Late 70s Volkswagen T2 with Westfalia Camper Package

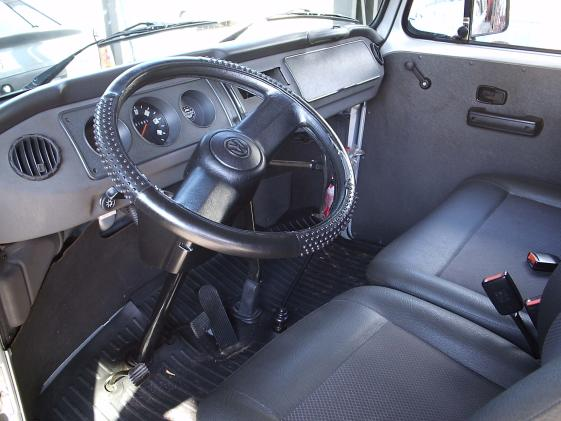
Brazilian Volkswagen Type 2 (T2) – 2005 Limited Edition

=== T2c ===
The T2c, with a roof raised by about 10 cm (3.9 in), was built starting in the early 1990s for the Mexican, South American, and Central American markets. Since 1991, the T2c has been built in Mexico with the water-cooled 1.8 L inline four-cylinder 53 kW (72 PS; 71 bhp) carbureted engine (easily identified by the large, black front-mounted radiator) and since 1995 with the 1.6 L air-cooled engines for the Brazilian market.

Once production of the original Beetle ended in late 2003, the T2 was the only Volkswagen model with an air-cooled, rear-mounted boxer engine, but then the Brazilian model shifted to a water-cooled engine on 23 December 2005. There was a 1.6 L 50 hp (37 kW; 51 PS) water-cooled diesel engine available from 1981 to 1985, which gave fuel economy of 15 km/L to 18 km/L—but gave slow performance and its insufficient cooling system led to short engine life.

The end of the Volkswagen air-cooled engine worldwide was marked by a Special Edition Kombi. An exclusive silver paint scheme and limited edition emblems were applied to only 200 units in late 2005, which were sold as 2006 models.

Stricter emissions regulations introduced by the Brazilian government for 2006 forced a shift to a flexible-fuel water-cooled engine able to run on petrol or alcohol. Borrowed from the Volkswagen Gol, the engine is a rear-mounted EA-111 1.4 L 8v Total Flex 1,390 cc (84.8 cu in), 58 kW (79 PS; 78 bhp) on petrol, and 60 kW (82 PS; 80 bhp) when run on ethanol, and 124 N⋅m (91 lbf⋅ft) torque.

Production of the Brazilian Volkswagen Kombi ended in 2013 with a production run of 600 Last Edition vehicles. A short film entitled "Os Últimos Desejos da Kombi" (English: The Kombi's Last Wishes) was made by Volkswagen Brazil to commemorate the end of production. Brazilian requirements that new cars have driver and passenger airbags and anti-lock brakes were also factors in the end of T2 production.

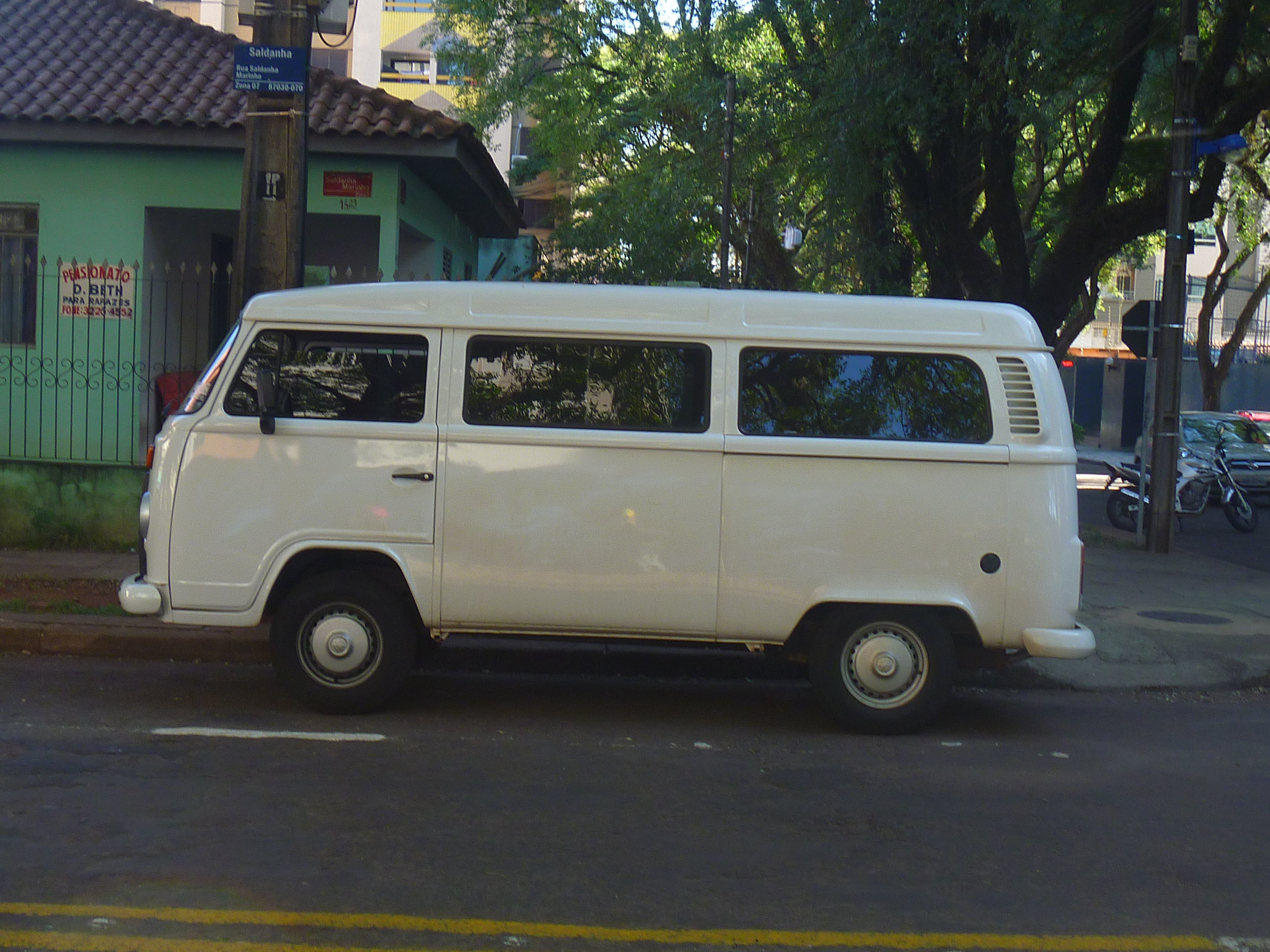
T2c in Brazil

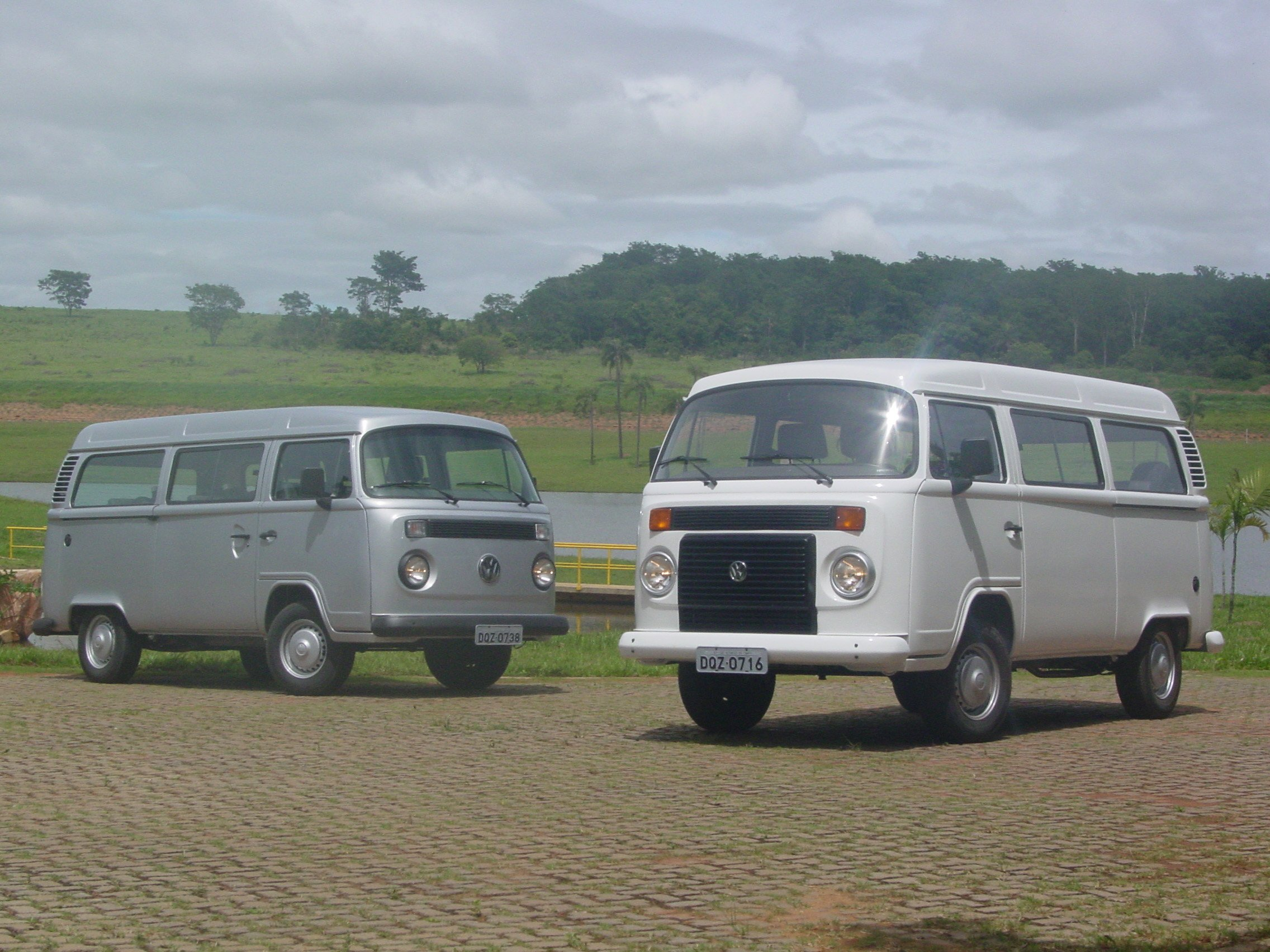
An air-cooled and a water-cooled VW Kombi (T2), made in Brazil. Model years 2005 and 2006

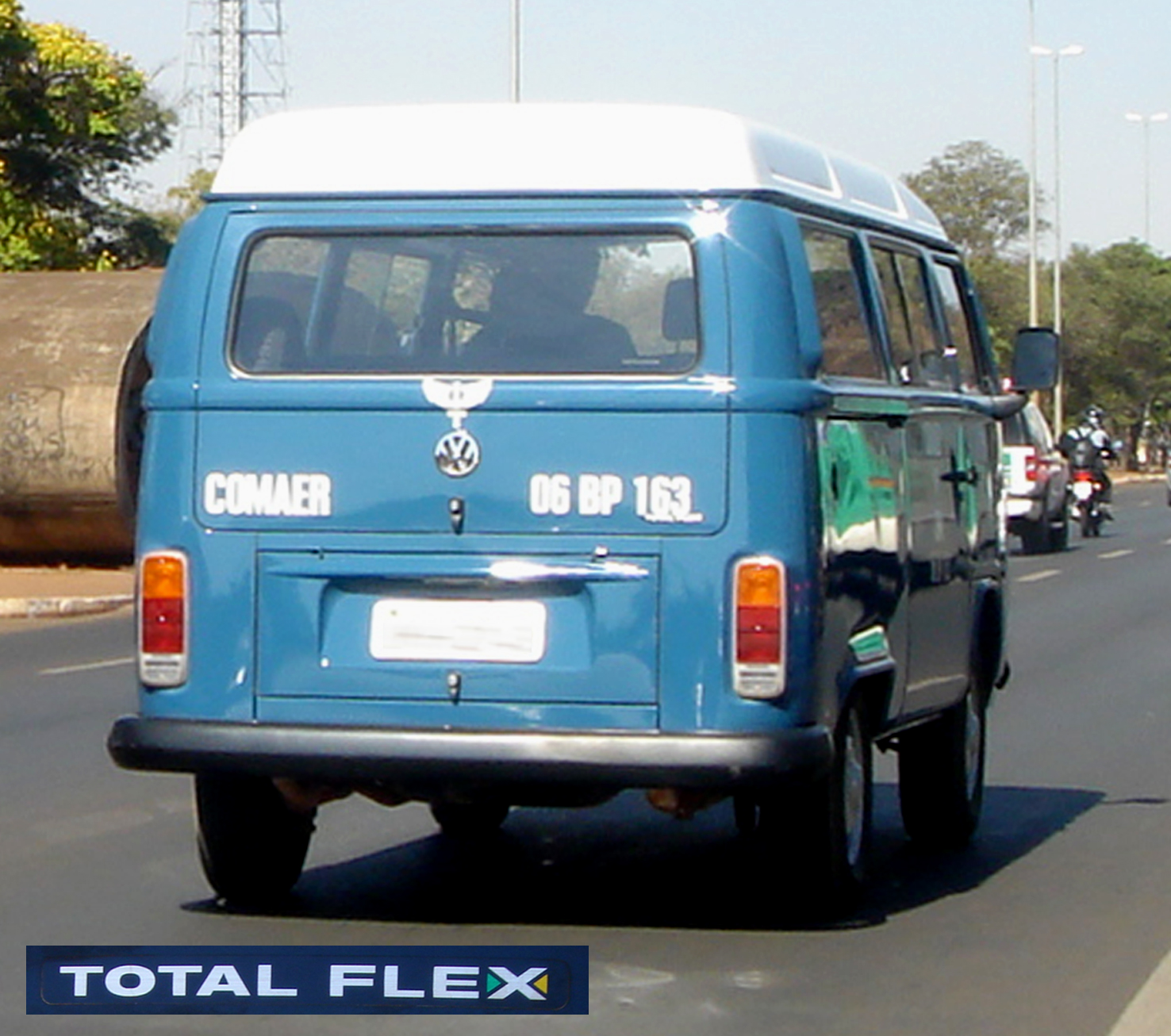
Brazilian Air Force 2006 Kombi with Total Flex flexible-fuel

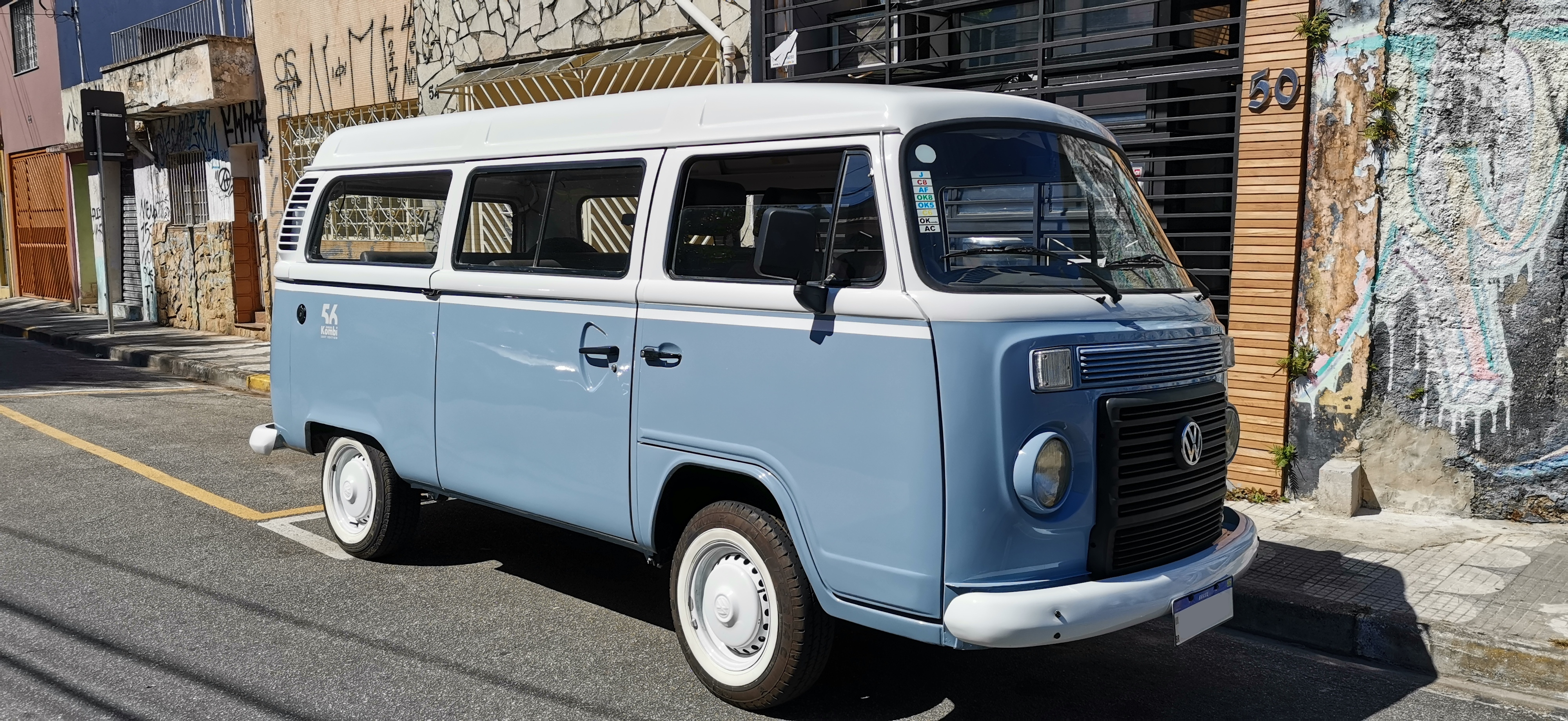
Brazilian Special Edition Kombi, the last variant sold

=== Azul ===
A T2 nicknamed Azul for its blue color survived the Palisades Fire, one of the January 2025 Southern California wildfires, and made national headlines after it was photographed amidst burnt out ruins. Volkswagen began restoring the bus in July.

== Third generation (T3; 1979) ==
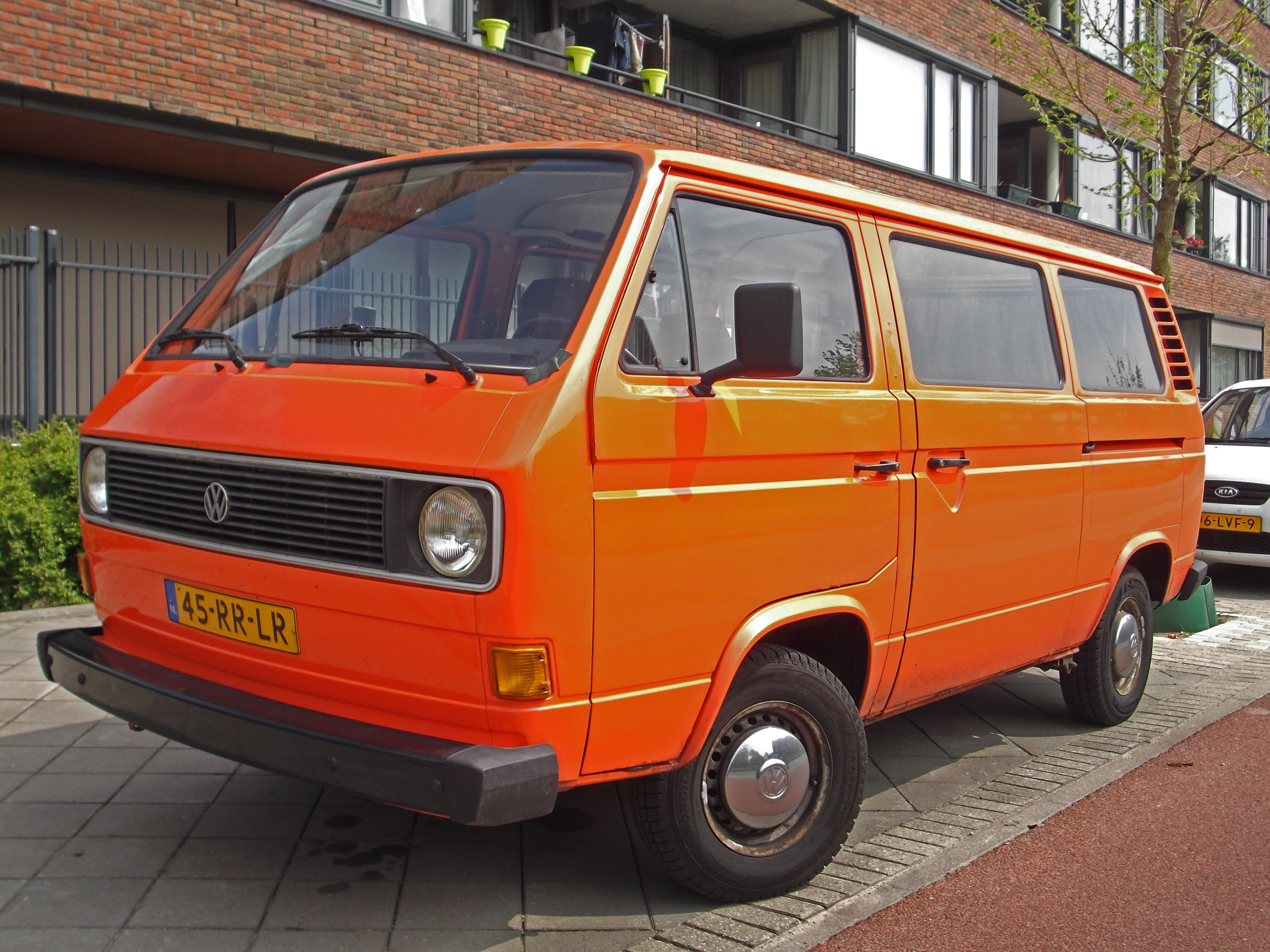
VW Type 2 / T3 Transporter

The Volkswagen Type 2 (T3), known as the T25 in the United Kingdom and as the Vanagon in the United States, was introduced in 1979, and saw the introduction of the T3 platform, and was one of the last new Volkswagen platforms to use an air-cooled engine. The Volkswagen air-cooled engine was phased out for a water-cooled boxer engine (still rear-mounted) in 1983. Compared to its predecessor, the T3 was larger and heavier, with square corners replacing the rounded edges of the older models. The T3 is sometimes called "the wedge" by enthusiasts to differentiate it from earlier generations.

== Fourth generation (T4; 1990) ==
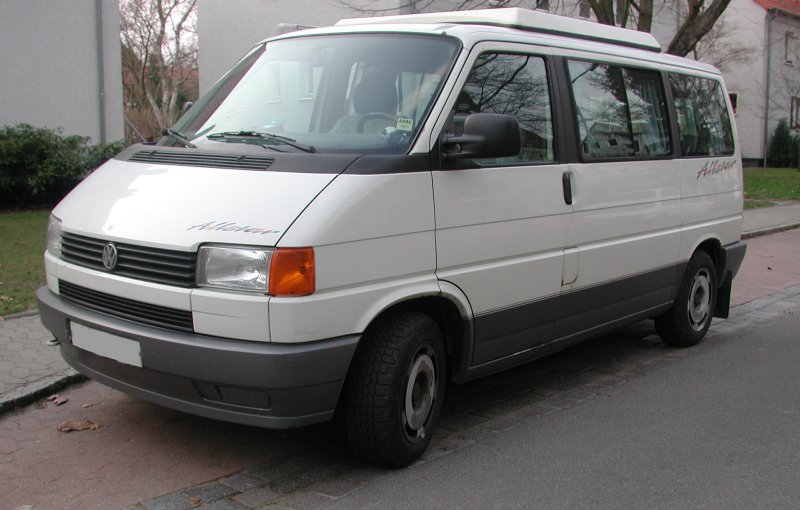
Early 1990s Multivan Allstar T4

For 1990, the T4 generation was released, with the model range dropping the Type 2 name in favor of the Transporter nameplate. Over 15 years after the Golf was introduced as the replacement for the Type 1 (Beetle), the Transporter range also adopted a front-engine, front-wheel drive configuration (Syncro 4WD returned as an option). Worldwide, the model range now used water-cooled, fuel-injected engines, with inline (and later VR6) engines replacing the "wasserboxer".

Through much of the world, the T4 was marketed as the Transporter, with three-row passenger vans known as the Caravelle; the Vanagon name was used in Japan. In the United States, the T4 was marketed as the Eurovan mid-size van for 1993 and from 1999 to 2003; from 1995 to 2005, the Eurovan served as the basis for multiple recreational vehicles marketed through the United States and Canada. Sales of the Transporter in North America ended in 2003.

== Fifth generation (T5; 2003) ==
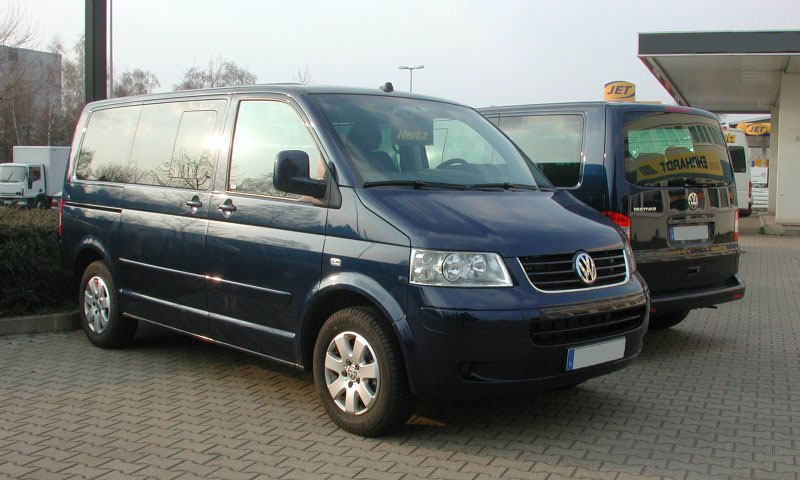
2004 Volkswagen Multivan T5

The Volkswagen Transporter T5 range is the fifth generation of Volkswagen's medium-sized light commercial vehicle and people movers. Launched on 6 January 2003, it went into full production in April 2003, replacing the fourth generation range.

Key markets for the T5 were Germany, the United Kingdom, Russia, France and Turkey. It was not sold in the US market because it was classed as a light truck, accruing the 25% chicken tax on importation. The T5 has a more aerodynamic design. The angle of the windshield and A-pillar is less; this makes for a large dashboard and small hood.

In June 2009, Volkswagen Commercial Vehicles announced that the one millionth T5 had rolled off the production line in Hanover.

The T5 GP, introduced in 2010, was heavily facelifted with some new power plants including the 180 bi-turbo range topper. These new engines saw the demise of the now "dirty" five-cylinder units.

Late 2015 will see the arrival of the "Neu Sechs", the New 6. The T6 will offer further engine changes in early 2016, but will launch with the previous generation engines. The new engines will see the introduction of Ad-Blu to meet with euro 6 emission compliance. The new 6 was expected by many to be more than just a facelift.

== Sixth generation (T6; 2015) ==
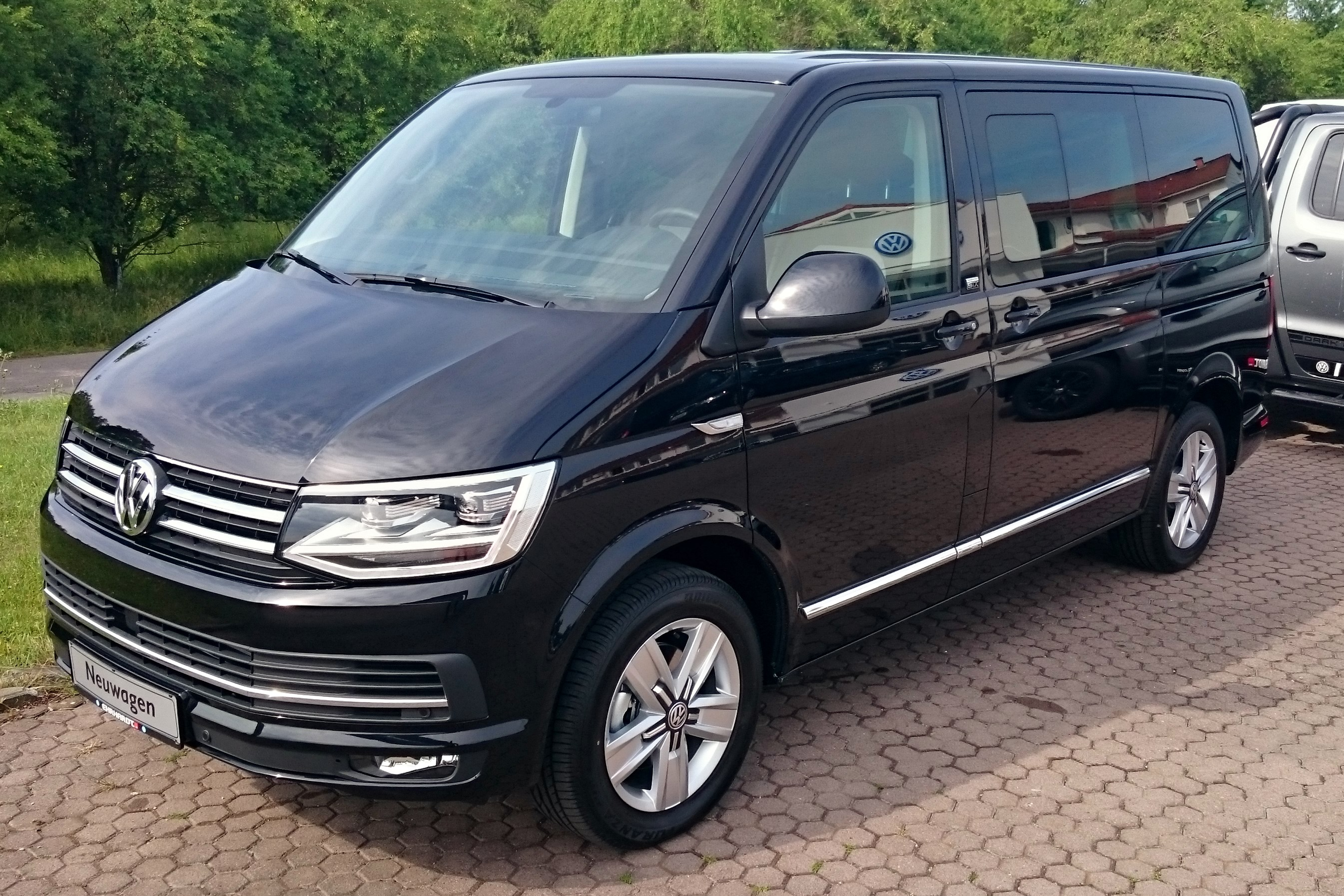
VW Multivan T6

The new T6 launched with the old Euro 5 non-AdBlue power-plants, but is offered with a Euro 6 diesel engine with 204bhp and AdBlue. Three further Euro 6 Adblue diesel power-plants with 84ps, 102ps and 150ps are also offered.

There is some debate in the community over whether the T6 is a new model, or simply a face-lift of the T5. There are obvious external changes to the nose and tailgate, while internally there is a new dash in two different versions. Volkswagen claims refinement to ride, handling and noise levels.

== Volkswagen Microbus concept vehicle ==
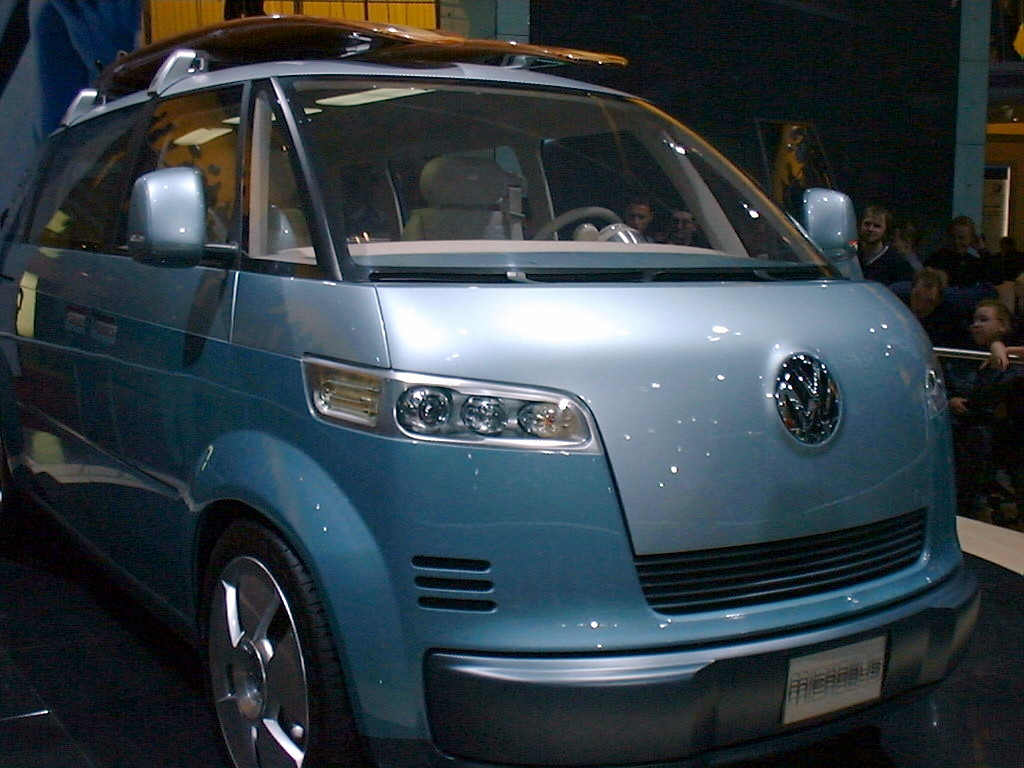
Volkswagen Microbus concept vehicle

In 2001, a Volkswagen Microbus concept was created, with design cues from the T1 generation in a spirit similar to the New Beetle nostalgia movement. Volkswagen planned to start selling it in the United States market in 2007, but it was scrapped in May 2004 and replaced with a more cost-effective design to be sold worldwide.

== Names and nicknames ==
Like the Beetle, from the beginning, the Type 2 earned many nicknames from its fans. Popular nicknames in German include VW-Bus, Bulli/Bully (a portmanteau of Bus and Lieferwagen (delivery van)), Hippie-van, or simply der Bus. The Type 2 was meant to be officially named the Bully, but Heinrich Lanz, producer of the Lanz Bulldog farm tractor, intervened. The model was then presented as the Volkswagen Transporter and Volkswagen Kleinbus, but the Bully nickname still caught on.

The official German-language model names Transporter and Kombi (Kombinationskraftwagen, combined-use vehicle) have also caught on as nicknames. Kombi is not only the name of the passenger variant but also the Australasian and Brazilian term for the whole Type 2 family, in much the same way that they are all called VW-Bus in Germany, even the pickup truck variations. In Mexico, the German Kombi was translated as Combi and became a household word thanks to the vehicle's popularity in Mexico City's public transportation system. In Peru, where the term Combi was similarly adopted, the term Combi Asesina (Murderous Combi) is often used for buses of similar size, because of the notorious recklessness and competition of bus drivers in Lima to get passengers. In Portugal, it is known as Pão-de-Forma (Breadloaf) because its design resembles a bread baked in a mold. Similarly, in Denmark, the Type 2 is referred to as Rugbrød (Rye bread). Finns dubbed it Kleinbus (mini-bus), as many taxicab companies adopted it for group transportation; the name Kleinbus has become an appellative for all passenger vans. The vehicle is also known as Kleinbus in Chile.

In the US, however, it is known as a VW bus, minibus, hippie-mobile, hippie bus, hippie van, "combie", Microbus, or Transporter to aficionados. The early versions produced before 1967 used a split front windshield (giving rise to the nickname "Splitty"), and their comparative rarity has led to their becoming sought after by collectors and enthusiasts. The next version, sold in the US market from 1968 to 1979, is characterised by a large, curved windshield and is commonly called a "bay-window". It was replaced by the Vanagon, of which only the Westfalia camper version has a common nickname, "Westy".

A popular nickname for the T3 was "2.6i" or "transi" in reference to the 2.6-liter Microbus/Caravelle sold in South Africa and their robust design being a popular choice for transportation of children respectively. Kombi is also a generic nickname for vans and minibuses in South Africa, Swaziland, and Zimbabwe, often used as a means of public transportation. In Nigeria it is called Danfo.

In the UK, it is known as a "Campervan". In France, it was called a "camping-car" (usually hyphenated) though this has been expanded to include other, often more specialized vehicles in more recent times.

Among VW enthusiasts in countries of the former Yugoslavia, especially in Serbia and Croatia, the T2 is commonly called a "Terrorist", probably due to its cameo appearance in the 1985 film Back to the Future, in which it is driven by a group of Libyan terrorists.

== Mexican production ==
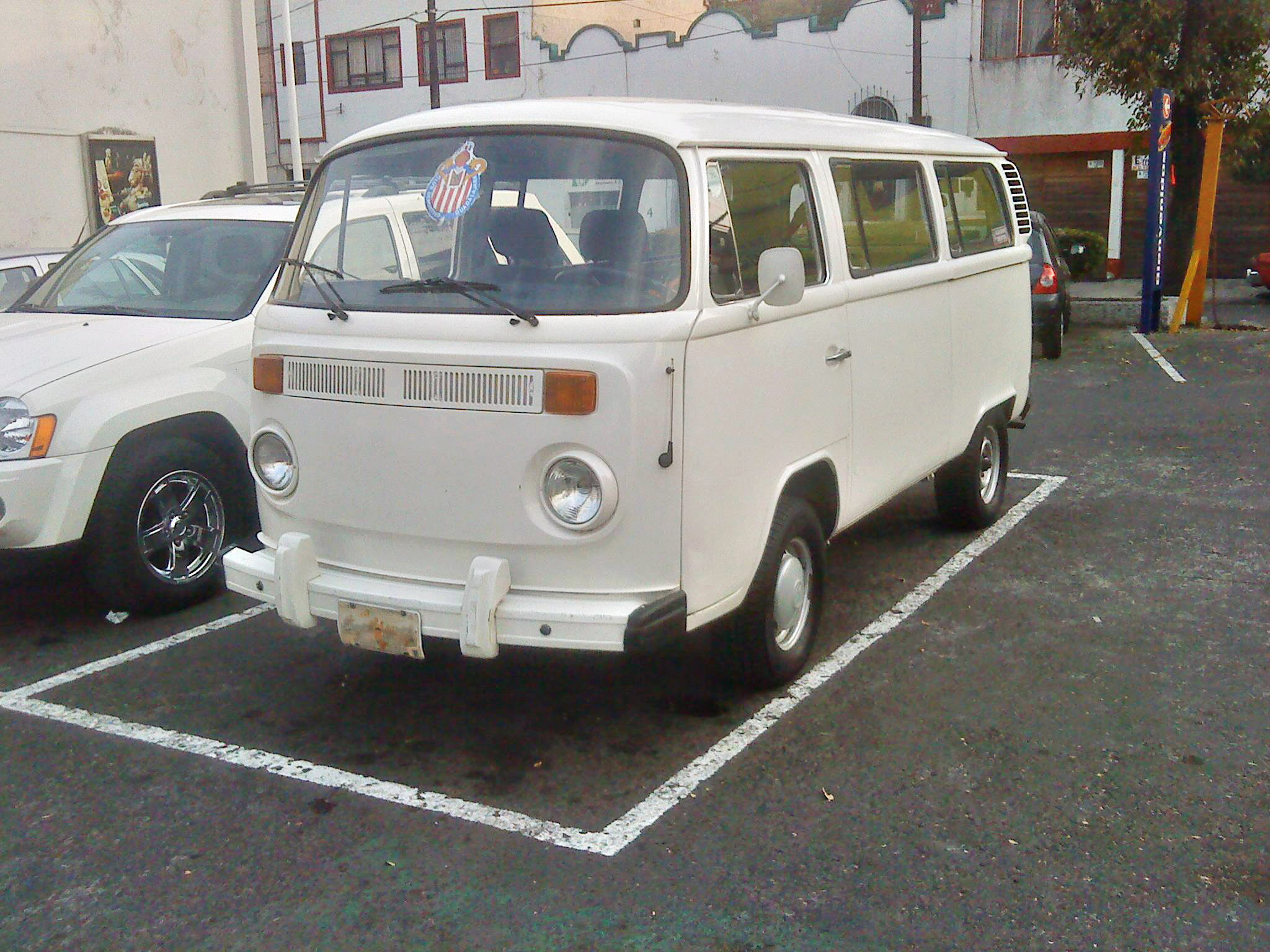
A 1980 Volkswagen Combi in Mexico City

T2 production began in 1970 at the Puebla assembly factory. These were initially built under license; from 1979 manufacture was carried out under Volkswagen's own auspices.

It was initially offered only as a nine-passenger version called the Volkswagen Combi (Kombi in Brazil), and from 1973 also its cargo van version called the Volkswagen Panel, both variants were fitted with the 1.5 L air-cooled boxer engine and four-speed manual gearbox. In 1974, the 1.6-liter, 34 kW DIN (46 PS; 45 bhp) boxer engine replaced the previous 1.5-liter unit, and production continued this way until 1987. In addition to DIN figures, Volkswagen Mexico also provided ratings in SAE net and SAE gross, 32 and 40 kW (44 and 55 PS; 43 and 54 bhp) respectively. In 1987, a water-cooled 1.8 L 62 kW (84 PS; 83 bhp) straight-four engine replaced the air-cooled 1.6-liter boxer. This new model is recognisable by its black grille (for its engine coolant radiator), bumpers and moldings.

In 1975, Volkswagen de México ordered two specially made pickups from Germany, one single cab and one double cab, for the Puebla plant. These were evaluated for the possibility of building pickups in Mexico, and were outfitted with every option except the Arctic package, including front and rear fog lights, intermittent wipers, trip odometer, clock, bumper rubber, PVC tilt, and dual doors on the single cab storage compartment. VW de Mexico was interested in having the lights, wiring, brake systems and other parts manufactured in Mexico. Ultimately, VW de Mexico declined to produce pickups, and the pickups were sold to an Autohaus, a Volkswagen dealer in San Antonio, Texas. They could not be sold in Mexico, as by law, no German-made Volkswagens were to be sold there. These were probably the only pickups that were produced in Germany for Mexican import, and have the "ME" export code on the M-code plate. The green double cab was sold to a new owner in New York, and has been lost track of. The light gray (L345, licht grau) single cab still exists. Pickups were not manufactured in Mexico, nor were they imported into Mexico from Germany, save for these two examples. In the 1980s, Mexican-made Type 2s were exported to other Latin American countries such as Chile.

In 1988, a luxury variant called the Volkswagen Caravelle made its debut in the Mexican market to compete with the Nissan Ichi Van, which was available in cargo, passenger and luxury versions. The main differences between the two are that the Caravelle was sold as an eight-passenger version, while the Combi was available as a nine-passenger version, the Caravelle was only painted in metallic colors, while the Combi was only available in non-metallic colors, and the Caravelle was fitted with an AM/FM stereo cassette sound system, tinted windows, velour upholstery, reading lights, mid and rear headrests, and wheel covers from the European T3 model.

In 1991, a 10 cm (4 in) higher roof made its debut across all variants, and the Combi began to be offered in eight- or nine-passenger variants. In 1991, since Mexican anti-pollution regulations required a three-way catalytic converter, a Digifant fuel injection system replaced the previous carburetor. The three variants continued without change until 1994.

In 1996, production ended in Mexico, with models henceforth being imported from Brazil. The Caravelle was discontinued and both the Combi and the Panel were only offered in white color. Finally, in 2002, the Combi/Panel were replaced by the T4 EuroVan Pasajeros and EuroVan Carga, passenger and cargo van in long wheelbase version, fitted with a 2.5-liter, 115 PS, straight-five engine and a five-speed manual gearbox imported from Germany. The Combi did continue to be available alongside the new model, with the last examples sold in Mexico being 50 of the "Combi Última Edición" from 2013.

== Hippie van ==
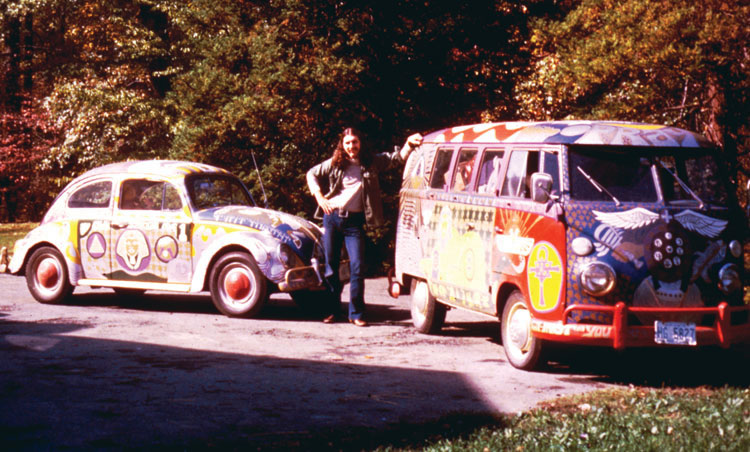
Volkswagen Type 2 on its way to the Woodstock music festival in 1969

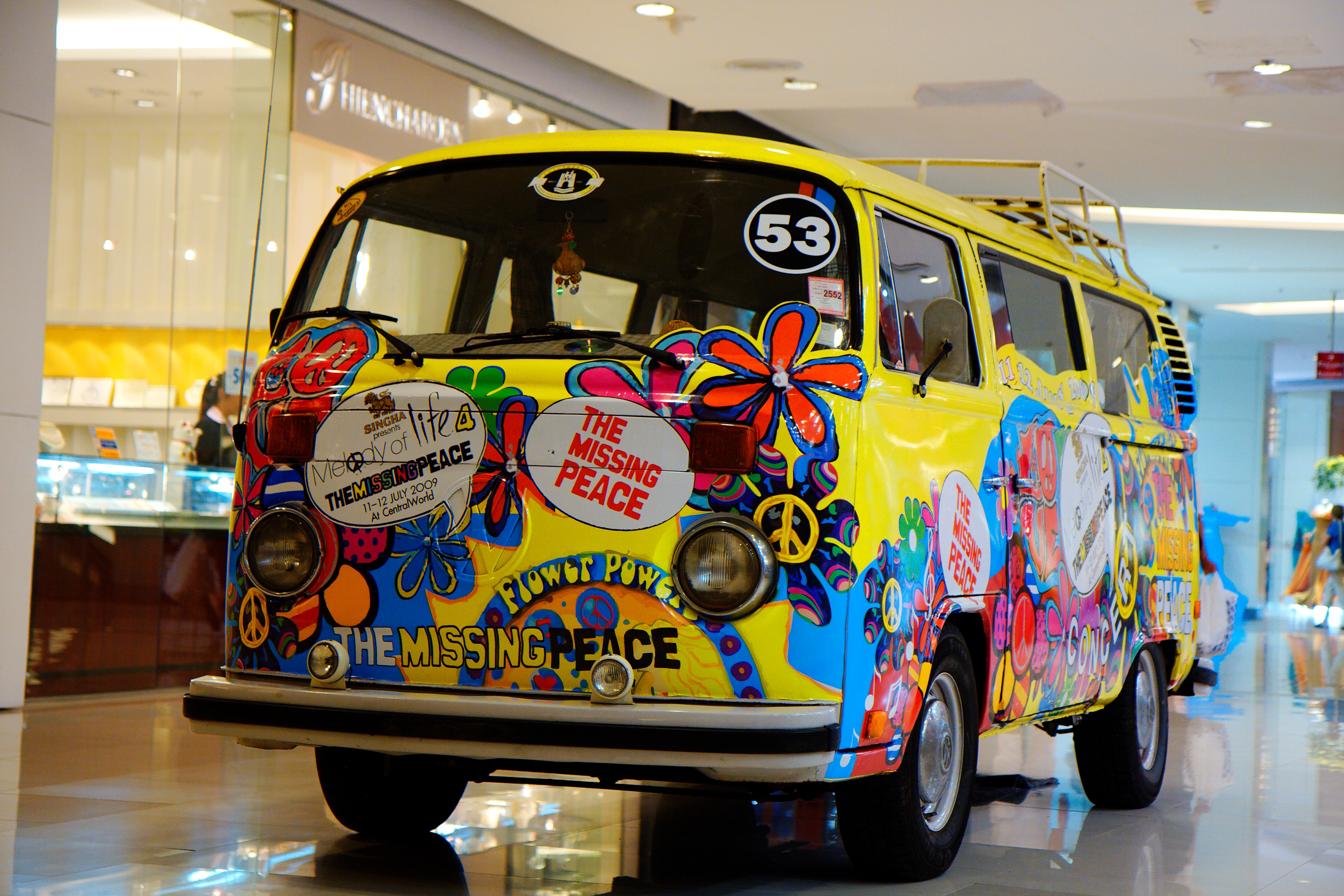
A painted Volkswagen Type 2 on display at CentralWorld in 2009

The VW Type 2 became popular with the counterculture of the 1960s, thanks to its ability to transport a large group of people while being cheap and easy to maintain. Its design was simple yet spacious, thanks largely to the rear-mounted engine. It contrasted with the large sedans and station wagons that were normal at the time, giving the van an alternative and rebellious image. Vans were often painted with extravagant designs in bright colors, making them stand out on the road even more. The "hippie van" remains iconic today, thanks to being featured on the cover of albums by musicians such as Bob Dylan and the Beach Boys, and being used by fans of the Grateful Dead while following the band on tour. The music festival Woodstock, which was held in the summer of 1969, saw plenty of brightly painted vans transporting excited young crowds.

== See also ==
- Minibus
- Volkswagen Bus
- Volkswagen California
- Volkswagen I.D. Buzz
- Volkswagen Transporter
- Volkswagen Westfalia Camper
