= Computer (disambiguation) =

A computer is a programmable machine that can perform arithmetic and logical operations.

Computer may also refer to:

- Computer (Courage the Cowardly Dog), a character in the US TV series
- Computer (magazine), published by the IEEE
- Computer (occupation)
- "Computers" (Don't Hug Me I'm Scared), a TV series episode
- Analog computer
- OK Computer, a 1997 Radiohead album
- Personal computer (PC)
- The Computer (character), a character on the TV series The Bear
- The Computer, a character in the role-playing game Paranoia

== See also ==
- Compute (disambiguation)
