= Karmann Mobil Coachbuildt =

Karmann Coachbuilt was a brand of recreational vehicle or camper manufactured by German company Karmann.

In 1975 Wilhelm Karmann visited South Africa, where he saw the Transporter gen 2 based Jürgens. He forged an agreement with Jürgens to make campers in Europe based on the same design. The first campers were based on the Volkswagen Type 2, with no over-cab sleeping compartment.

In 1979 Volkswagen introduced the third generation of Transporter, the T3/T25/Vanagon. Karmann then launched the Gipsy, with an over-cab sleeping compartment. Later it launched the Karmann Cheetah, with design changes. When VW launched the Syncro, Karmann offered this model.

When VW launched the T4 in 1990, Karmann developed another Cheetah, with over cab sleeping compartment and the Gipsy exterior. For the 1996 model year the T4 Caravelle got a face lift and the 2,5 TDI engine. Karmann Mobile then made a totally new camper, with a much more modern construction technique named Colorado.

In 2003 the Transporter T5 was introduced and Karmann continued to offer the Colorado in longer and heavier versions.

In 1978 Karmann Started to offer a camper based on the LT 28.

In 1996 VW launched the LT2 based on the Mercedes Sprinter. Karmann then introduced the Missouri, with a new design.
