= Westfalia =

Name given to various camper vans

Coordinates: 51°50′42.15″N 8°18′28.61″E

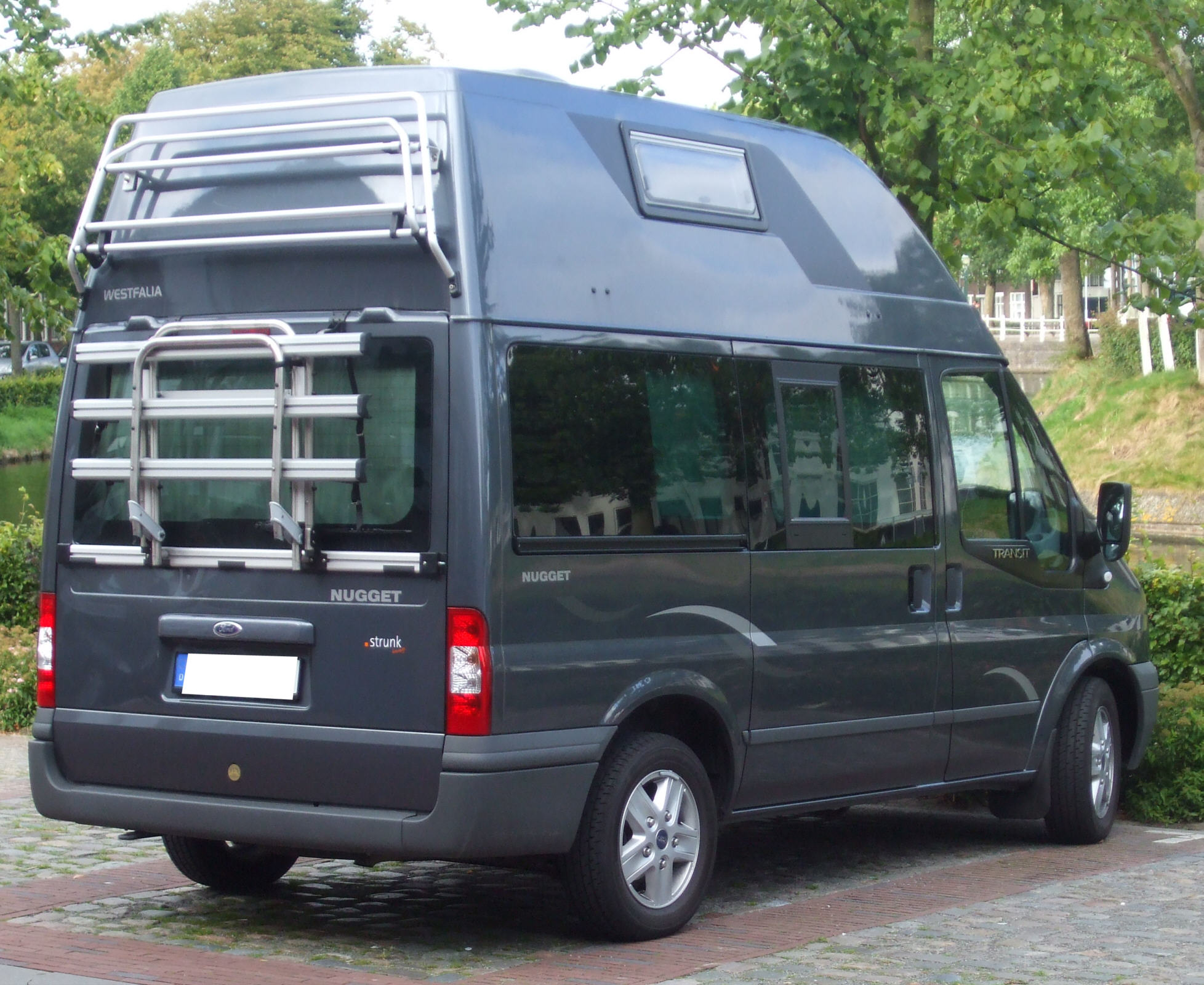
Westfalia Nugget / Ford Transit

Westfalia is the designation of various specially converted Volkswagen camper vans. Westfalia is named after the company, Westfalia-Werke, the contractor that built the vans, headquartered in the town of Rheda-Wiedenbrück, located in the Westphalia region of Germany.

== Products ==
Westfalia-Werke also converted non-Volkswagen vans and produced camping trailers and other products, but they were best known for their Volkswagen camper conversions. Westfalia began converting Volkswagen buses in 1951. Their famous "pop-top" package was added later and became very popular on the second-generation VW Bus from 1968 to 1979, and its successor the Vanagon (also called Westy and Campmobile), the Sven Hedin and Florida conversions on the Volkswagen LT, and then the T4 EuroVan, which was discontinued in 2003. This design also inspired many imitators, with dozens of other companies worldwide offering pop-top van conversions. Therefore, not all pop-top Volkswagens are Westfalia conversions, although in the United States, the Westfalia conversion was by far the most common. Conversely, not all Volkswagen Westfalia conversions had pop-tops or cooking facilities. Volkswagen offered a "Weekender" package in the 1970s with a Westfalia interior, but no pop-top. Later, some Vanagon conversions were offered with a pop-top and interior table, but lacked cooking facilities and instead included a luggable 12-volt refrigerator.

In 1999, DaimlerChrysler purchased a 49% stake in Westfalia-Werke's van conversion division, and in 2001 absorbed the remaining 51%. Of course, since DaimlerChrysler is a Volkswagen competitor, this spelled the end of the Volkswagen-Westfalia partnership. Volkswagen still offers pop-top camper conversions in Europe, which are made in-house since 2005. Vans leave the Transporter/Multivan assembly line and are moved to a dedicated facility to be converted into Californias, in Ocean, Coast, or Beach versions. Meanwhile, Westfalia now makes Mercedes Marco Polo pop-top vans, as well as larger Sprinter high-roof — factory camper conversions for Mercedes vans, distributed in the United States by Airstream and badged as Dodge Sprinters. They also provide automotive accessories to BMW, including trailer hitches.

In 2008, a management buyout occurred and Westfalia Van Conversion is now an independent entity. It still converts some vehicles for major car manufacturers to sell through their own networks, such as the Ford Nugget, but also markets conversions through its own network of recreational vehicle dealers. These models include the Ford-based Big Nugget, Volkswagen Crafter-based Sven Hedin, and the Michelangelo. The Michelangelo vehicle uses a Fiat Scudo chassis and is designed to be a major competitor to the Volkswagen California. Westfalia has recently returned to making their own conversions of Volkswagen Transporter vans, in direct competition with the Volkswagen California.

On 28 January 2010, Westfalia-Werke filed for bankruptcy, citing a 40 percent drop in sales. According to the filing, they would like to keep doing business while they restructure. Westfalia was acquired by the Rapido group in 2011.

== Models ==
Model	Base vehicle	Produced from	Produced to
Berlin	Transporter		
Syncro	Transporter/Vanagon	1985	1992
Sven Hedin	LT28/Crafter	1977	
Sven Hedin - Sprinter	Sprinter	2009	Present
Florida	LT28/LT31		
Joker/Club Joker/Top Joker/Sport Joker	Transporter	1978	
Nugget/Big Nugget	Transit/Tourneo	1985	Present
California	Transporter	1988	2004
Atlantic	Transporter	1989	
James Cook	Sprinter	2006	
Michelangelo	Scudo	2009	
Kepler one	Transporter		Present
Kepler Six	Transporter		Present
Jules Verne	Vito/V-Class/Viano		Present
Columbus	Fiat Ducato/Ram ProMaster van		Present
Marco Polo	Vito/V-Class/Viano	1996	Present
Amundsen	Ducato	2012	Present

== Gallery ==
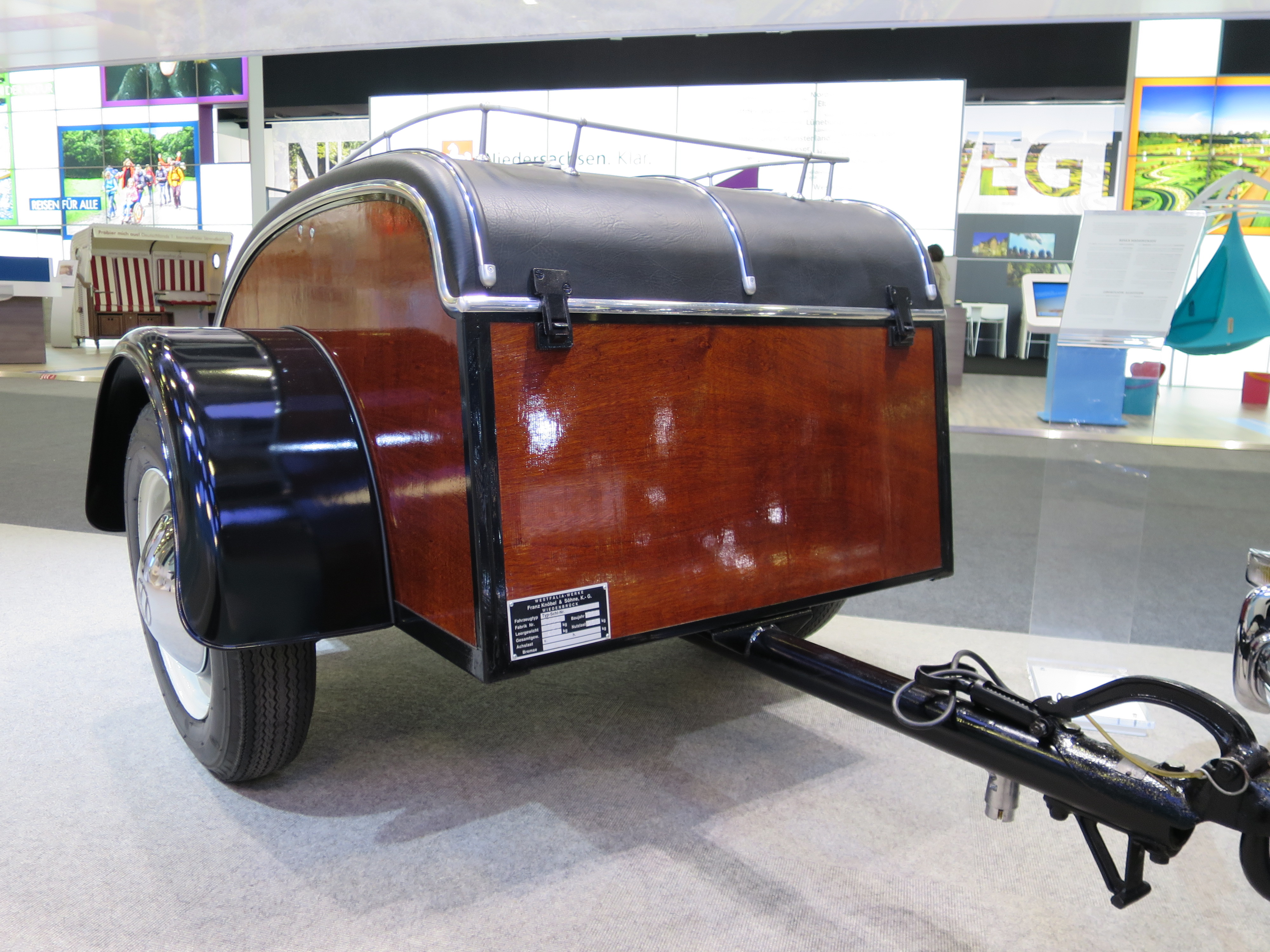
1958 Westfalia Wolfsburg trailer

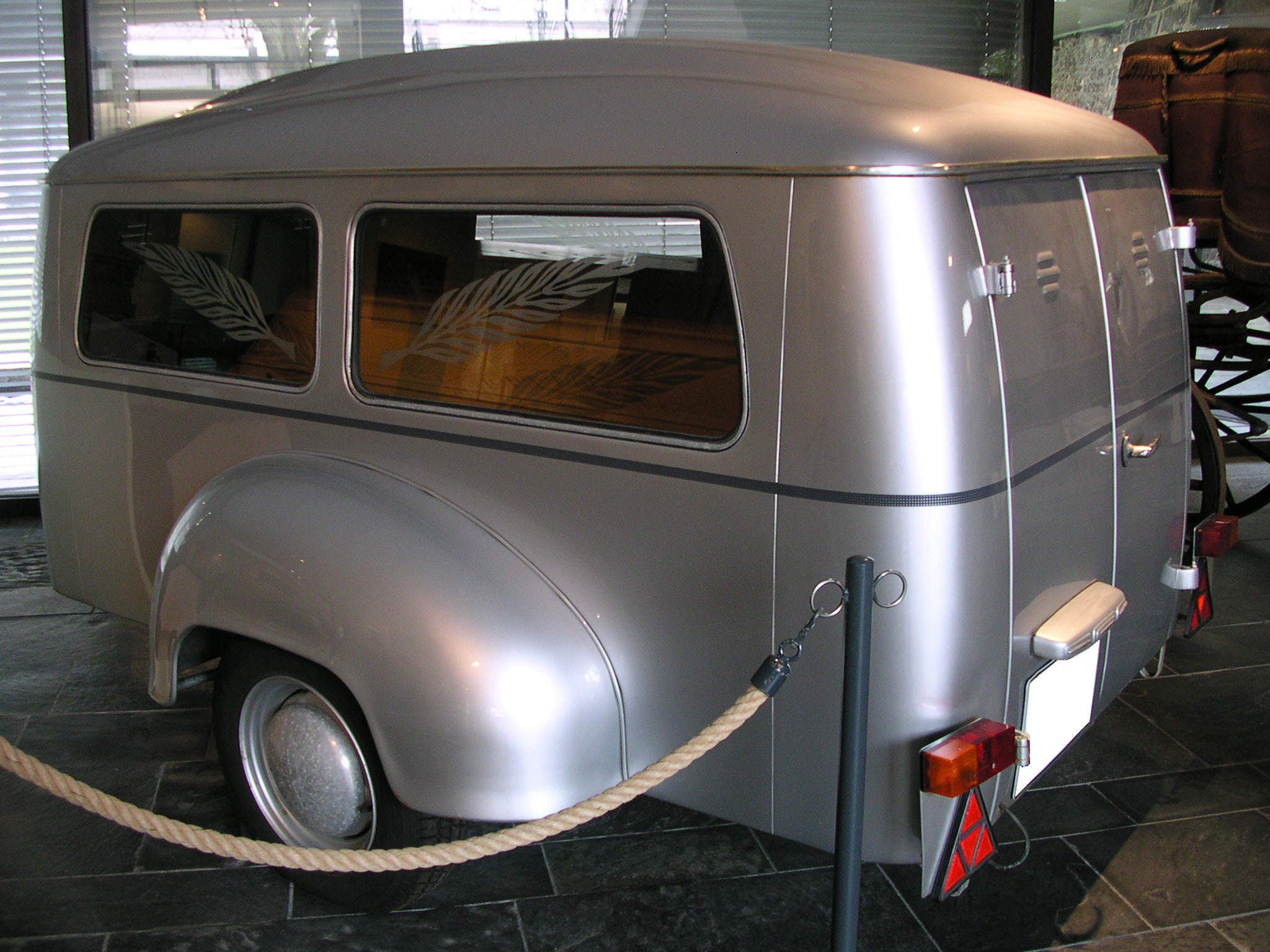
1964 Westfalia camping trailer, (Westfalia Leichenwagen-Anhänger)

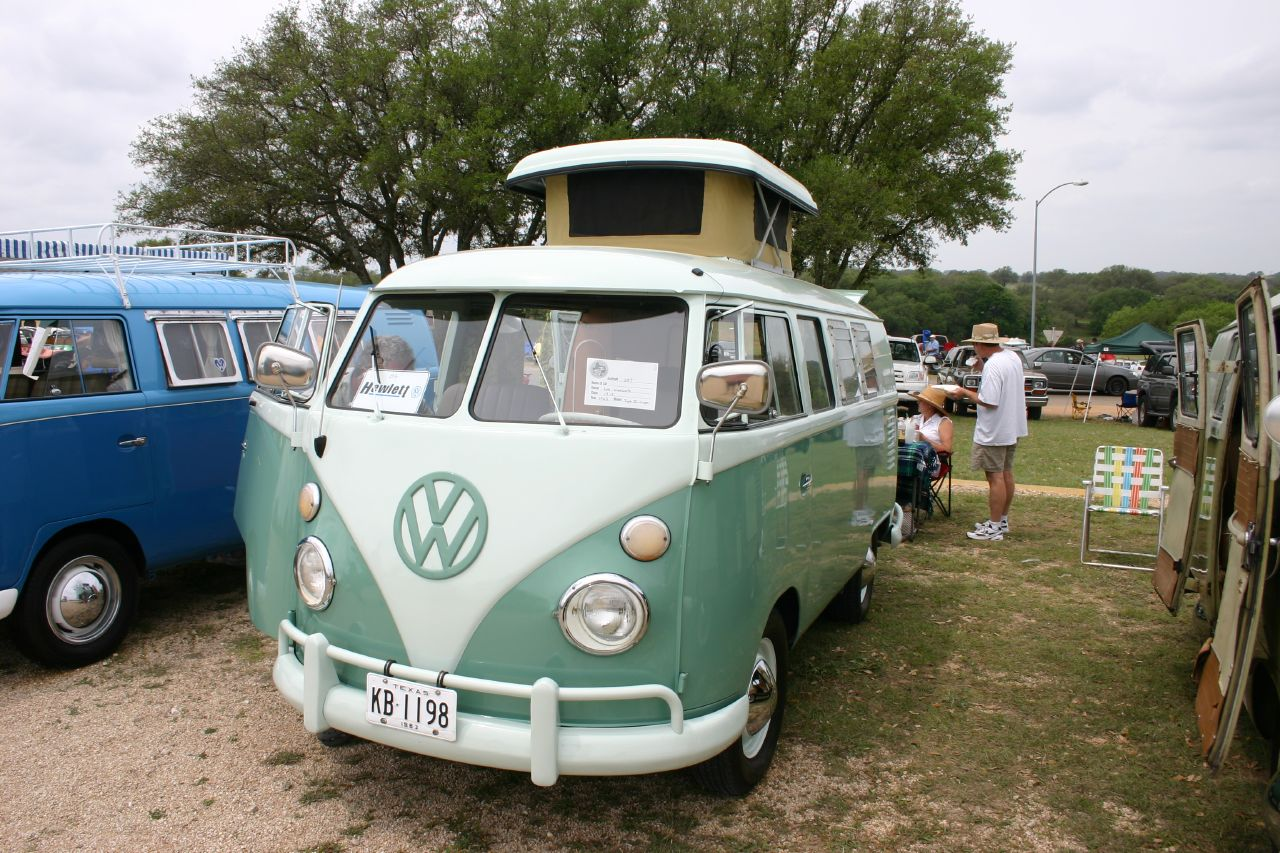
Split-windshield VW Camper

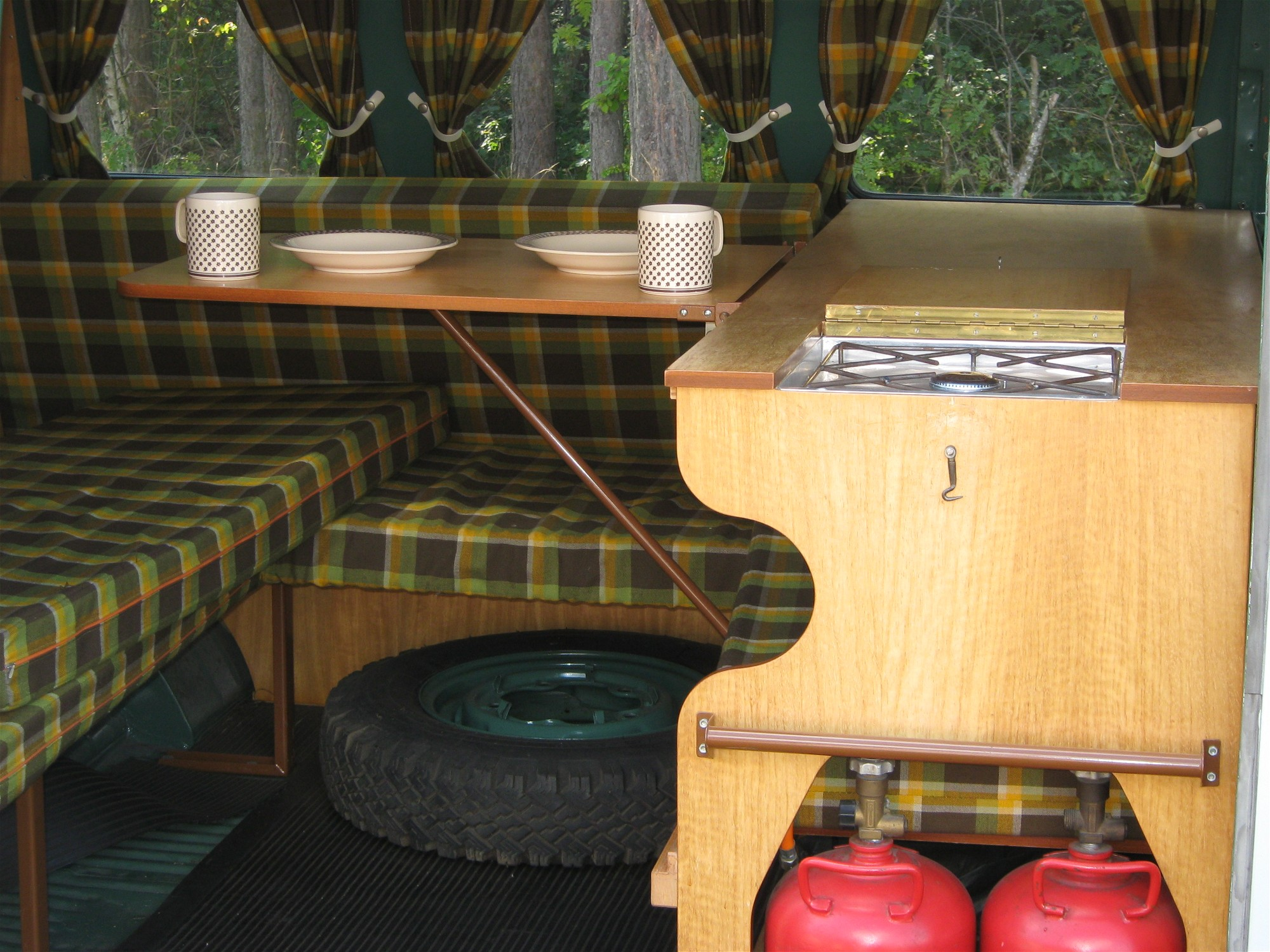
Westfalia Campingbox on early VW bus

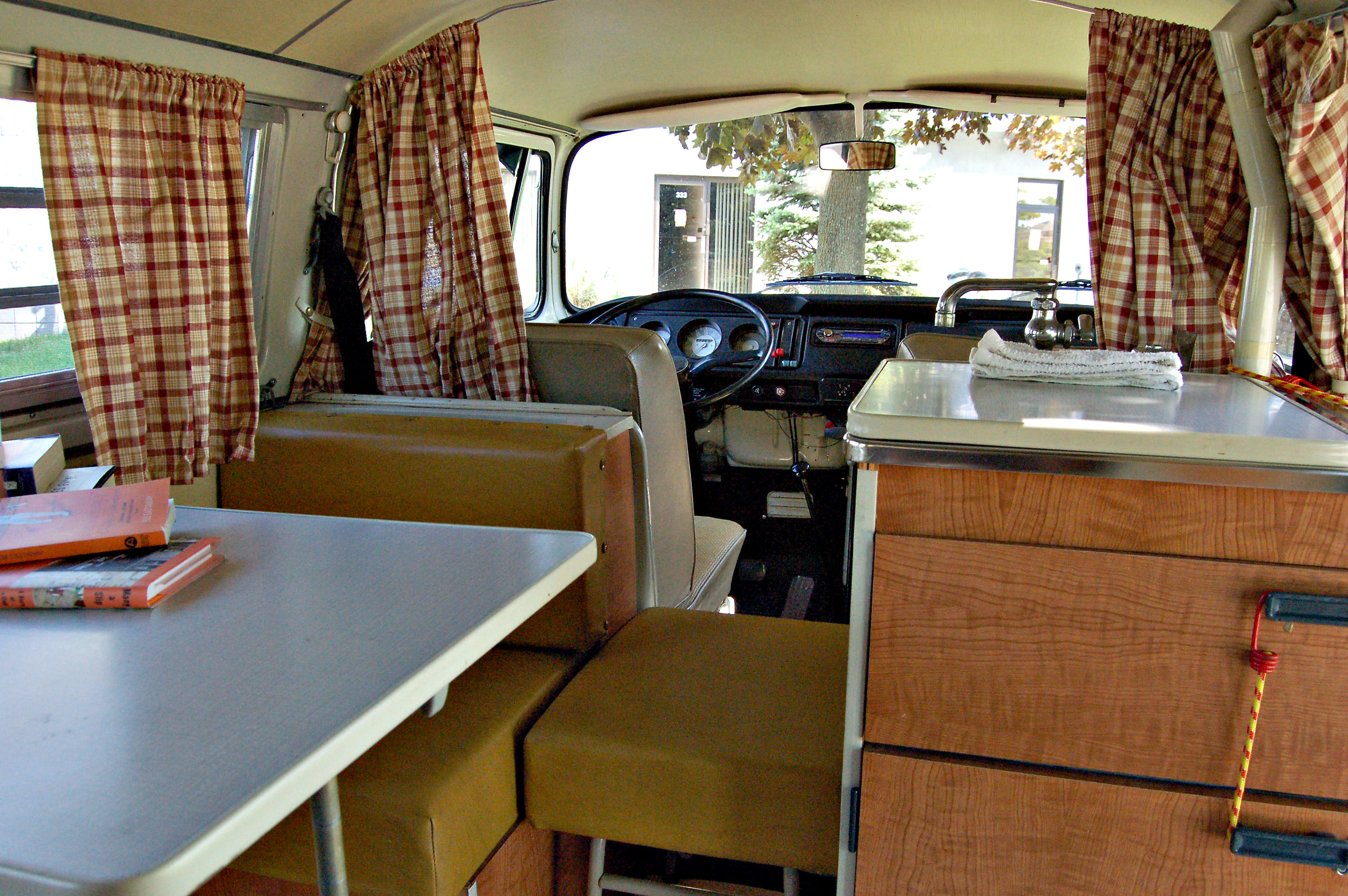
Westfalia 1970 VW bus

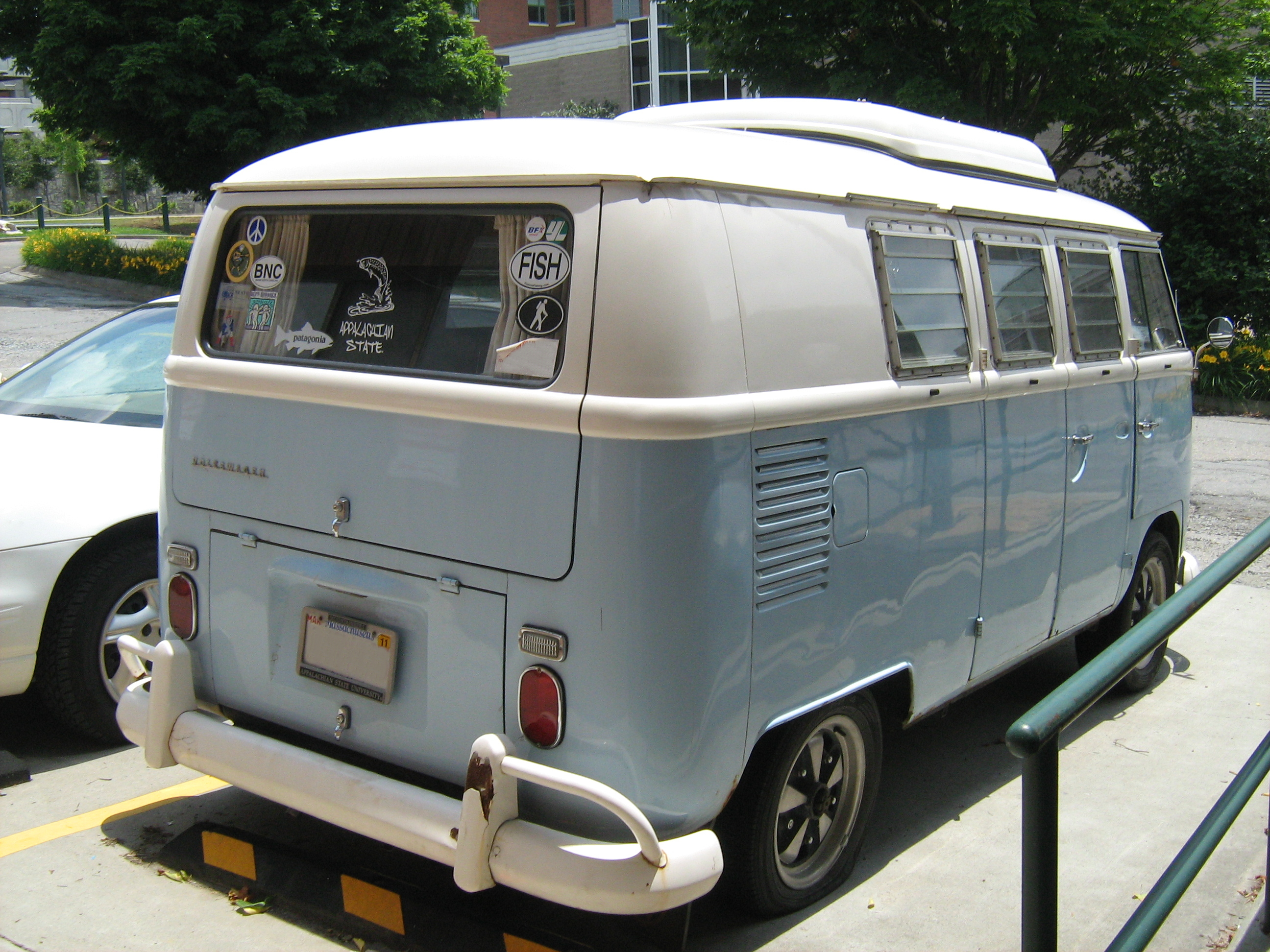
Split-windshield VW Camper

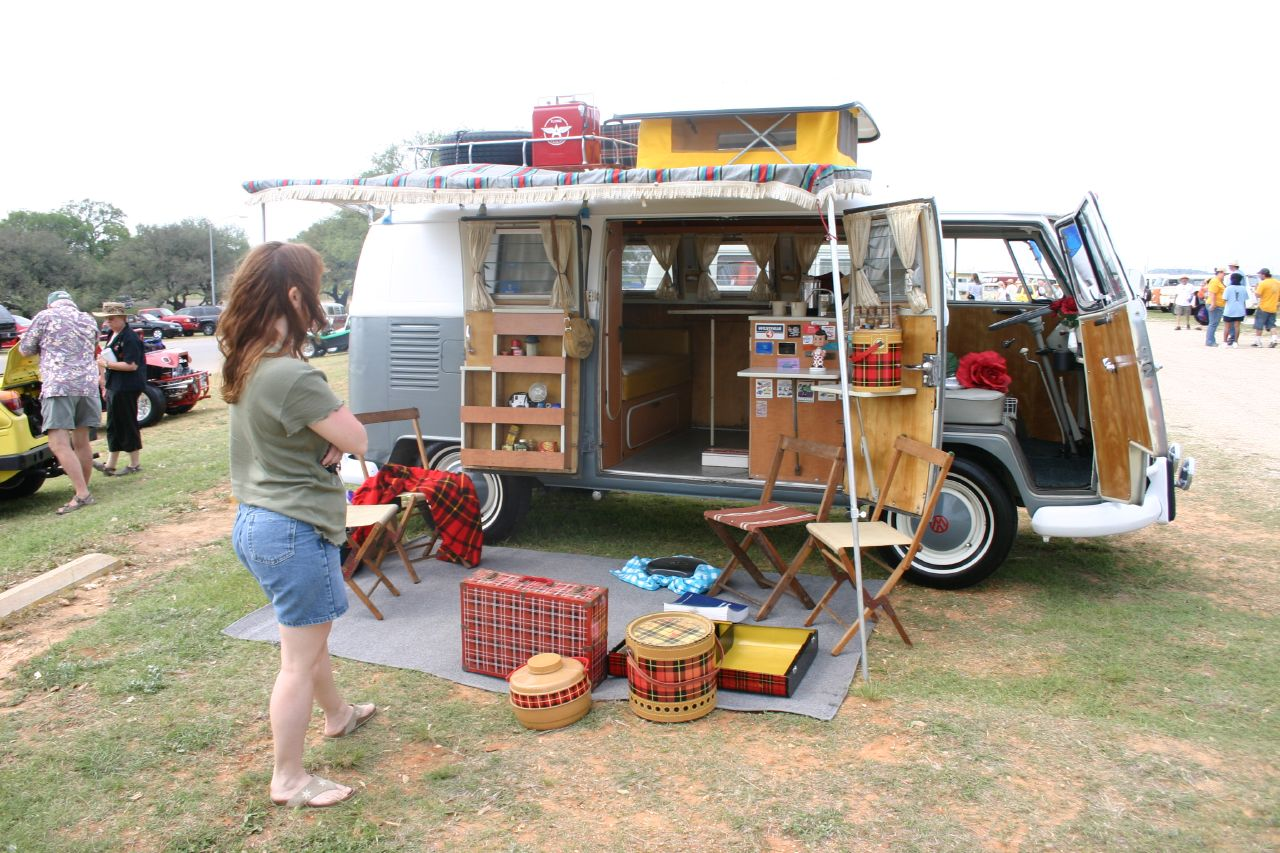
Westfalia split-windshield camper with options, Westy

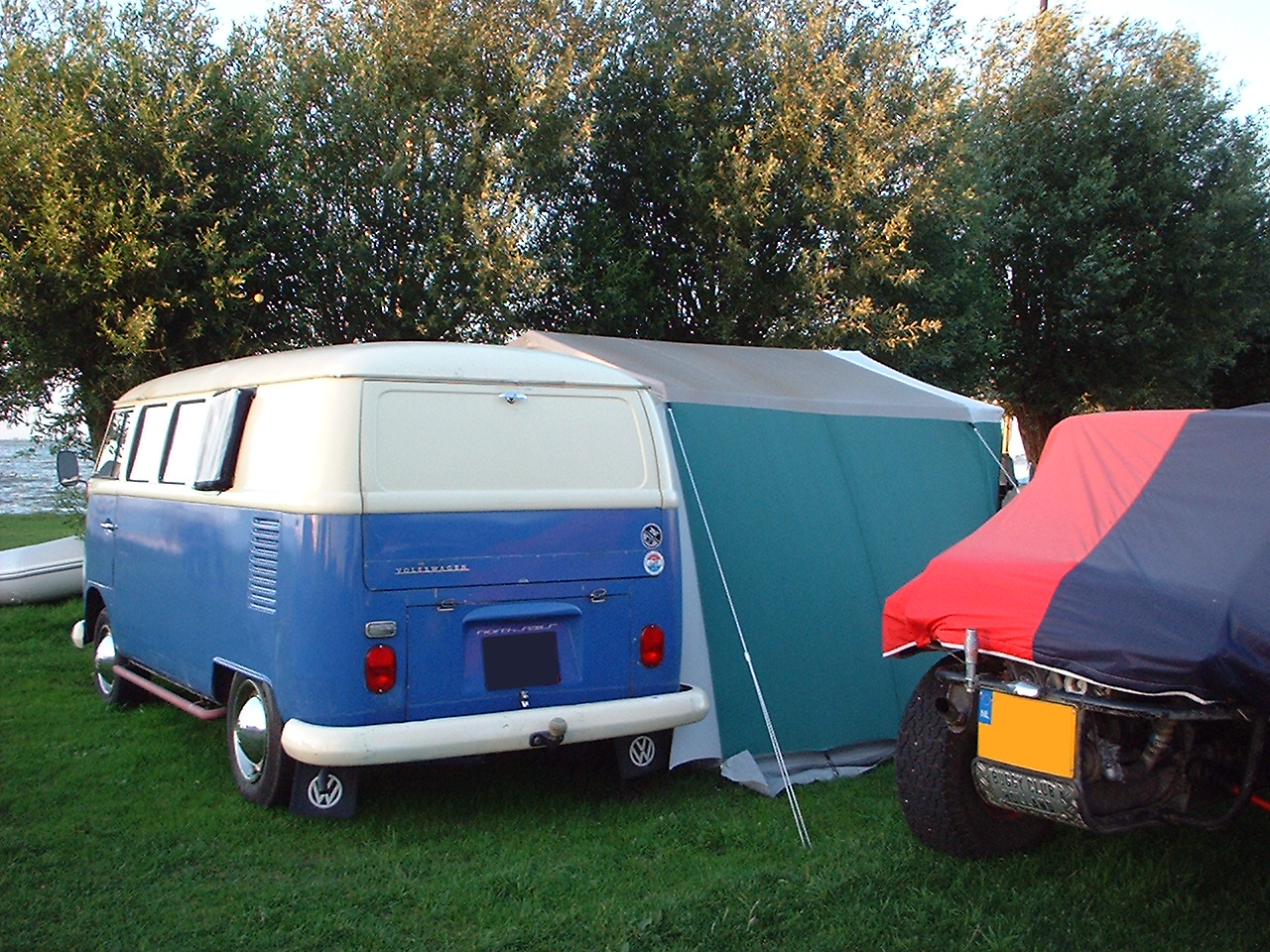
T1 Camper with side tent

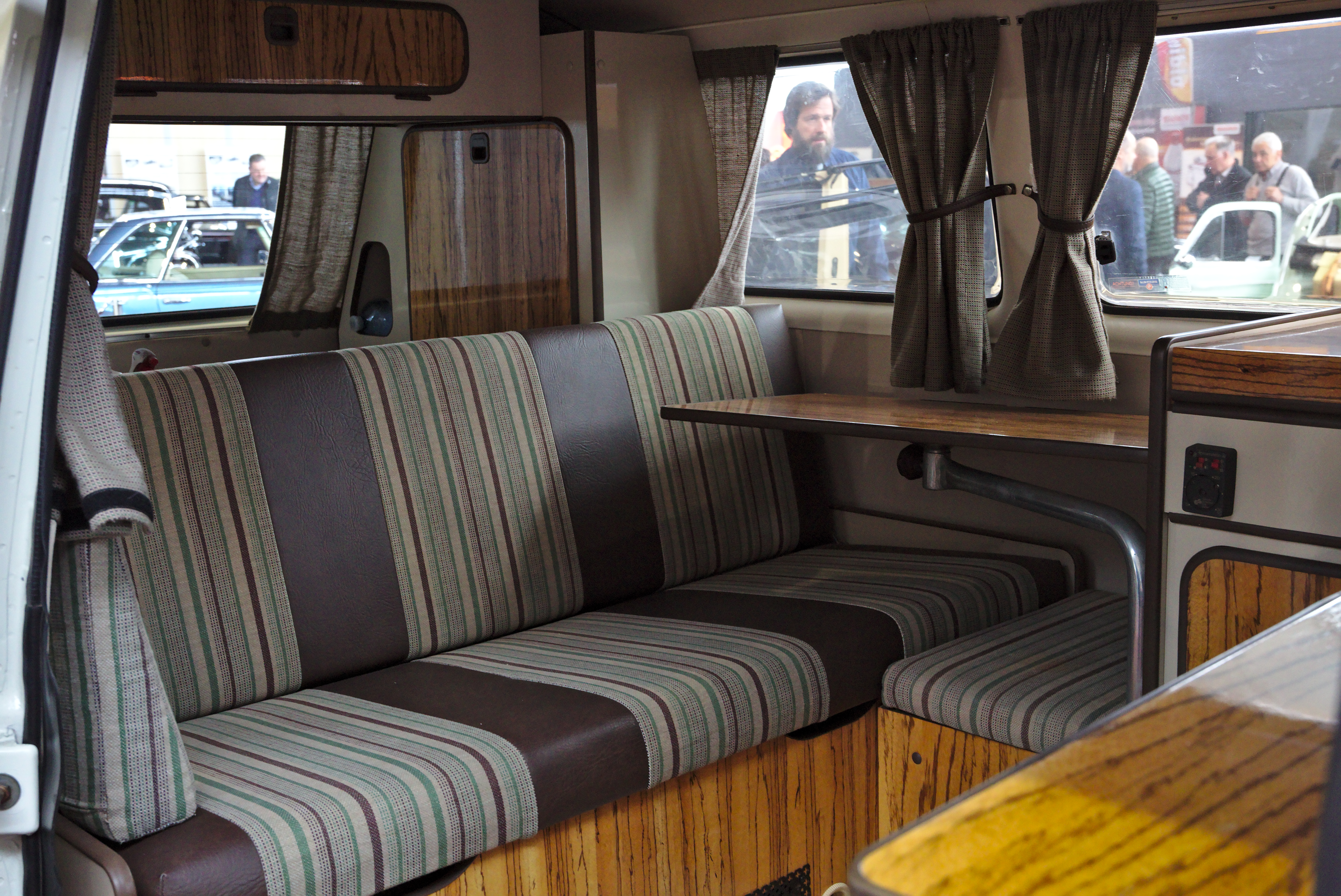
Vanagon inside

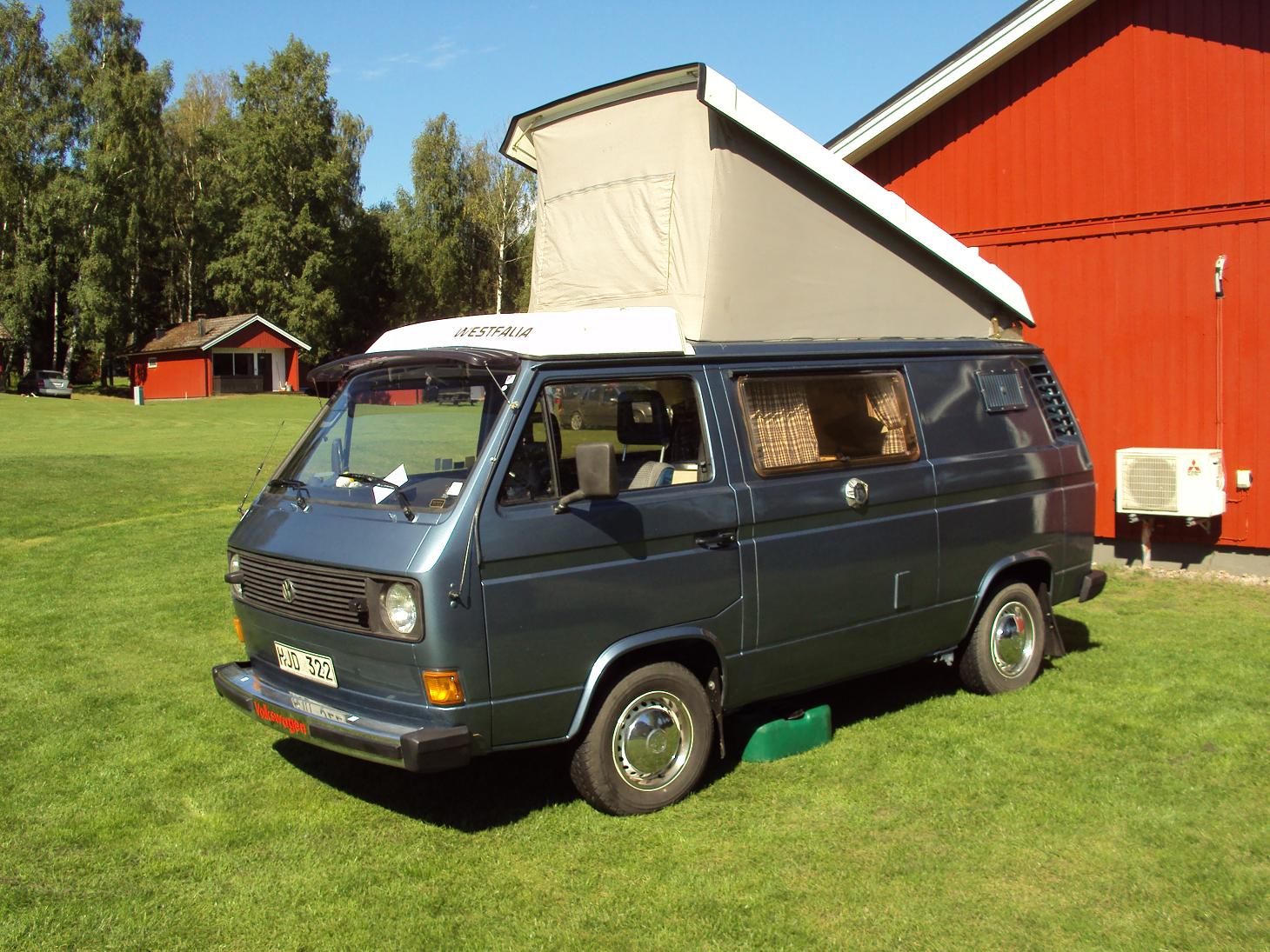
Volkswagen T3 Westfalia Camper - Vanagon

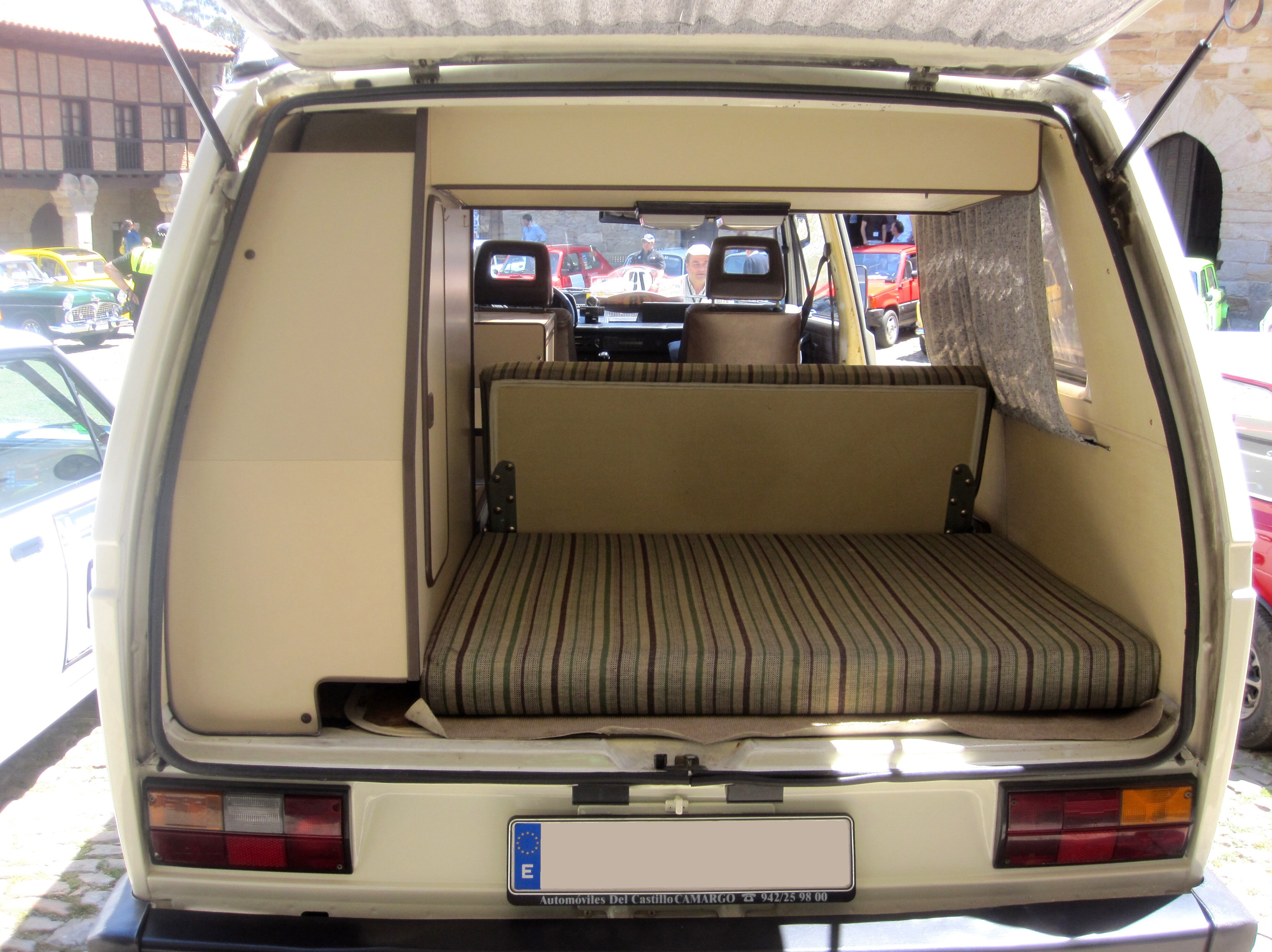
Vanagon rear bed

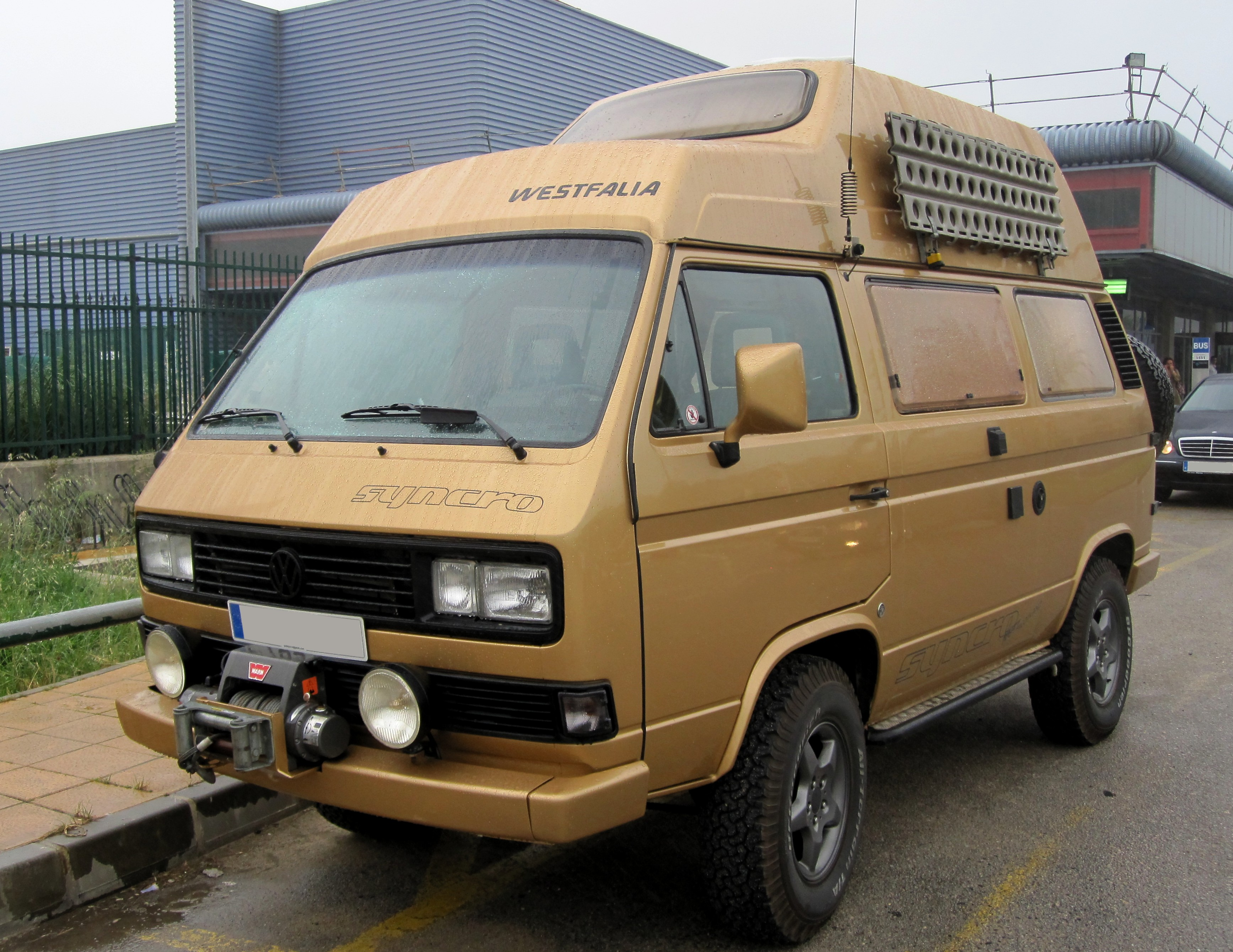
1989 Volkswagen Caravelle Club Westfalia Syncro, a 4X4 Vanagon

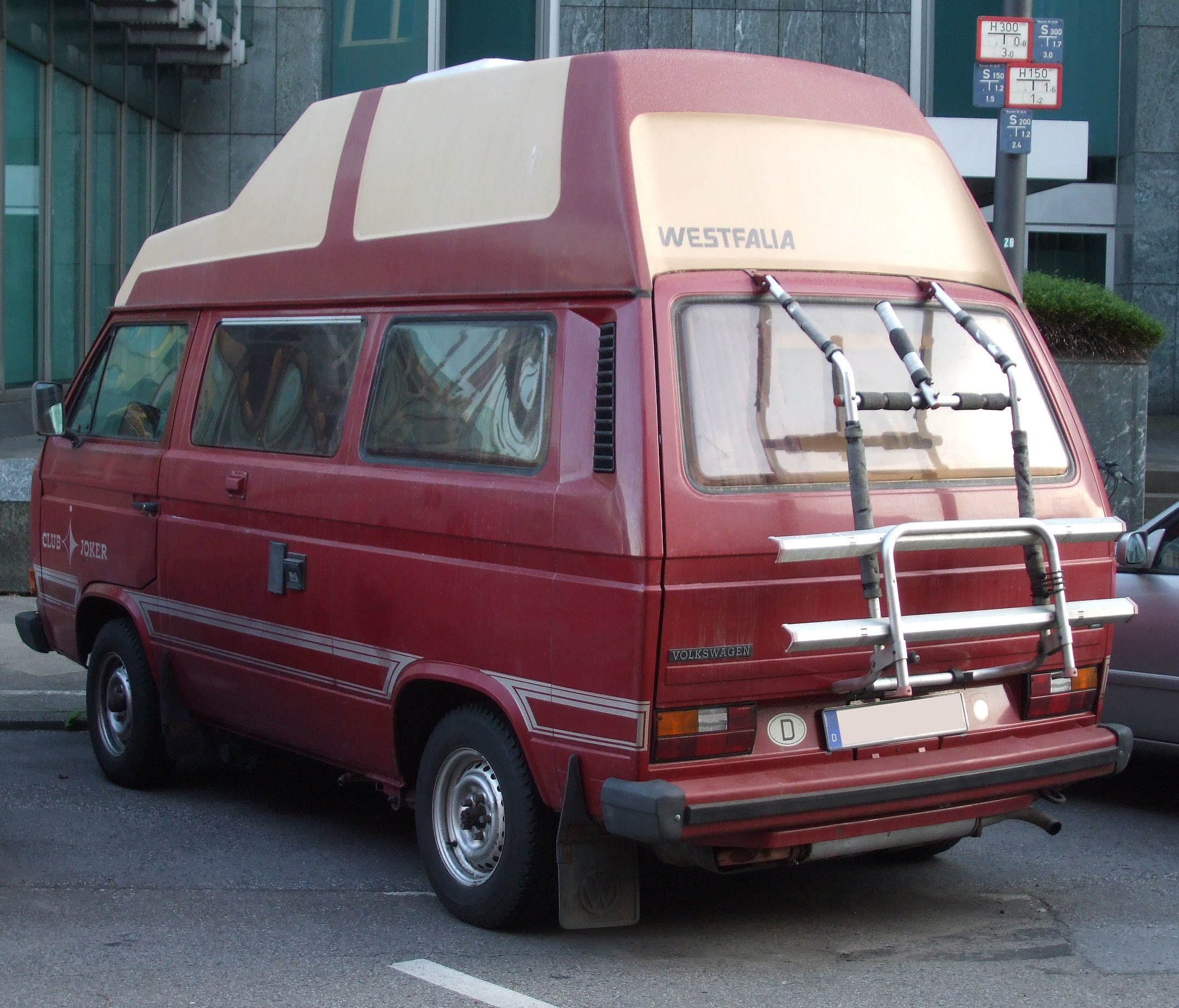
Westfalia Club-Joker VW

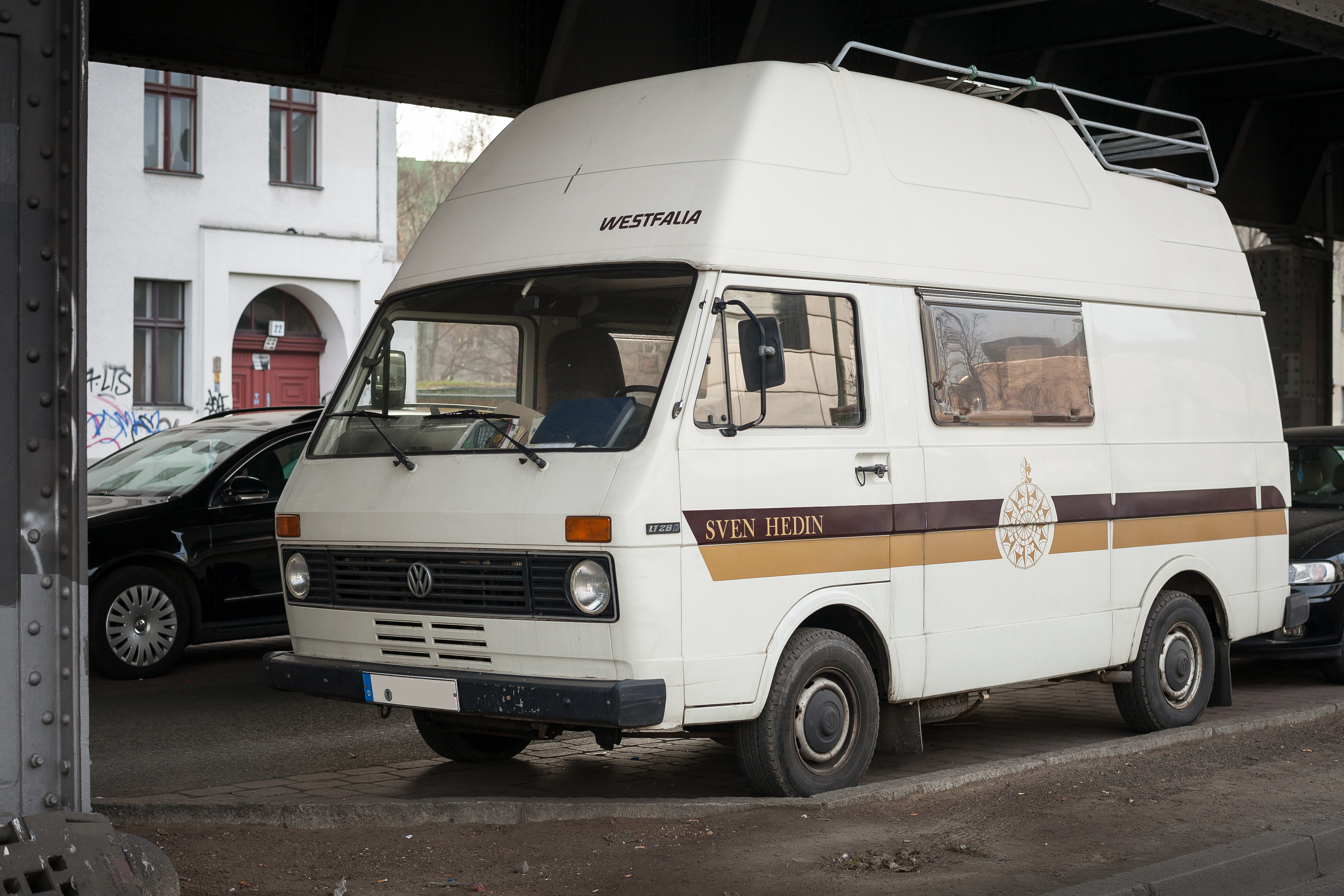
Volkswagen LT Camper Westfalia hard top, Sven Hedin

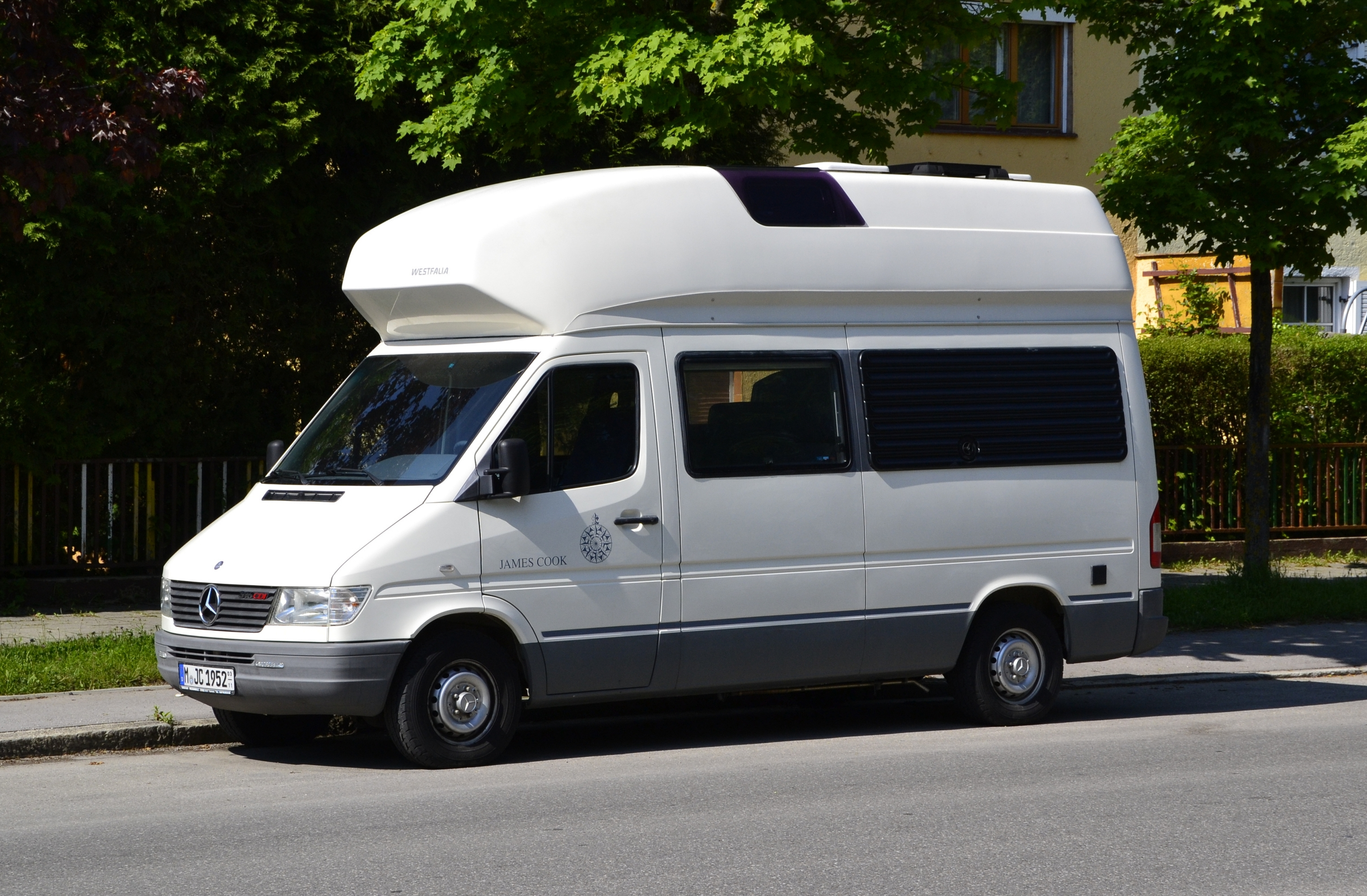
Westfalia James Cook in Munich

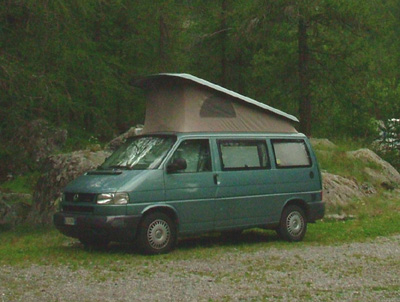
2000 VW Camper on a Volkswagen EuroVan

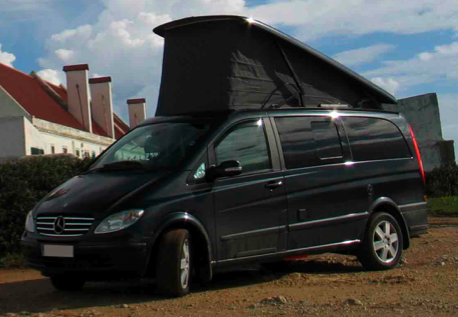
Westfalia, Marco Polo camping edition on a Mercedes-Benz Vito

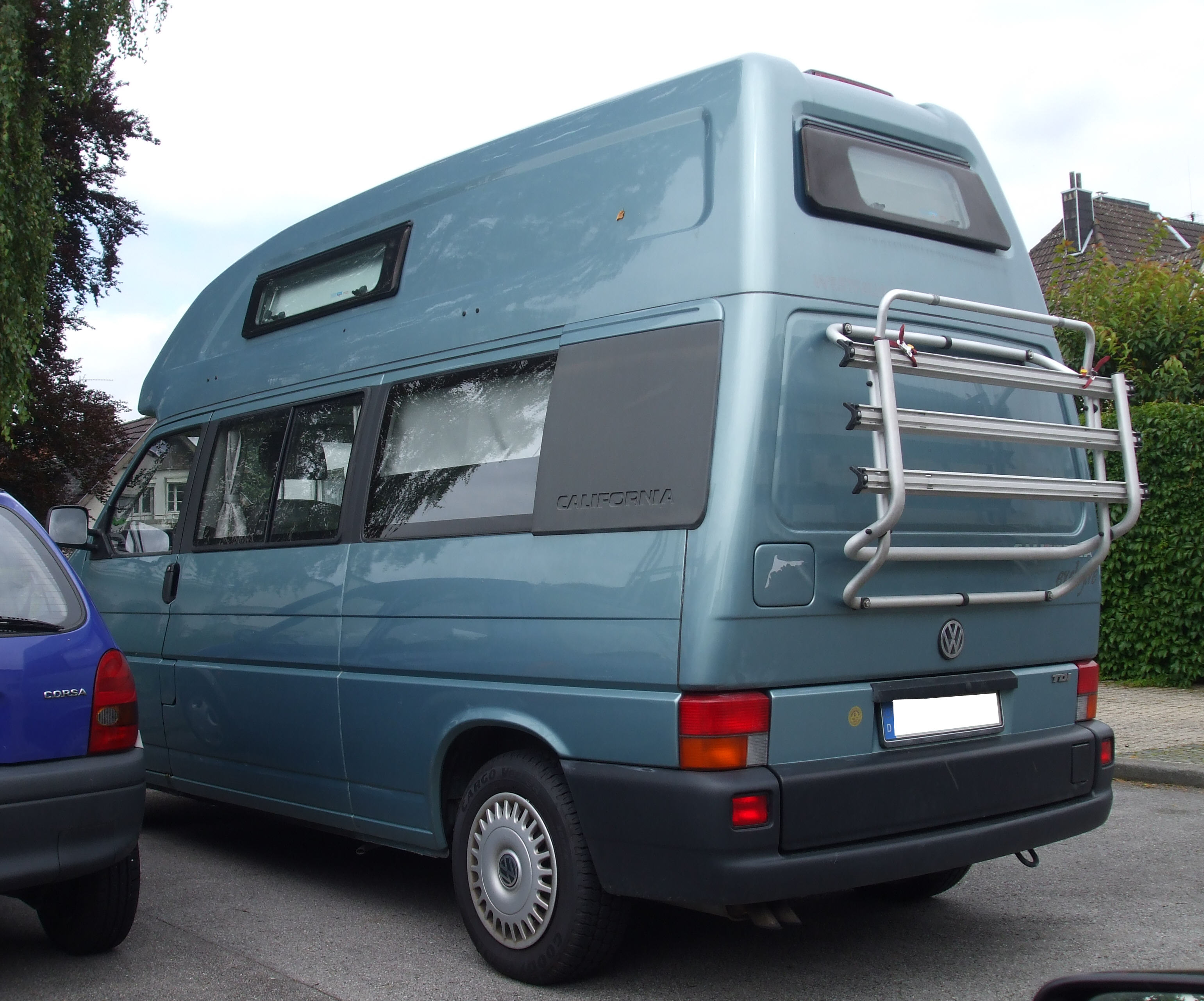
Westfalia California on a VW T4

Westfalia Van Conversion logo
