= Volkswagen Transporter (T4) =

Fourth generation of the Volkswagen Transporter

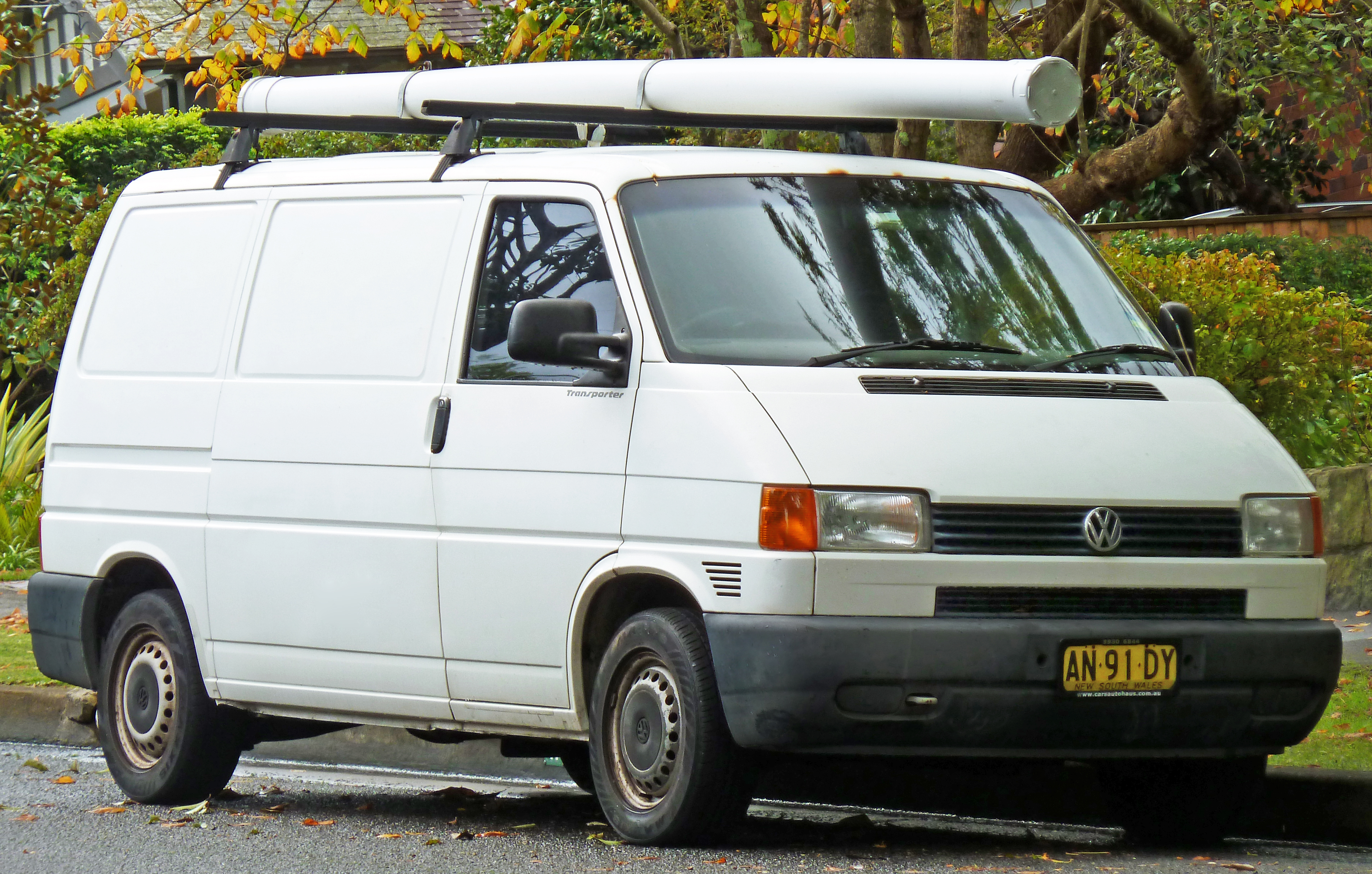

Overview
- Manufacturer: Volkswagen (1990–1995); Volkswagen Commercial Vehicles (1995–2004)
- Also called: Volkswagen EuroVan (North America); Volkswagen Caravelle; Volkswagen Vanagon (Japan)
- Production: 1990–2004
- Assembly: Germany: Hanover; Poland: Poznań; Indonesia: Jakarta (National Assemblers); Taiwan: Taoyuan; Malaysia: Shah Alam; Philippines: Alaminos

Body and chassis
- Class: Light commercial vehicle (M)
- Body style: 4-door van 5-door van 6-door van 2-door pickup platform 3-door pickup platform 4-door pickup platform 4-door campervan
- Layout: Front engine, front-wheel drive or four-wheel-drive
- Platform: Volkswagen Group T4 platform

Powertrain
- Transmission: 5-speed manual 4-speed 01P automatic

Dimensions
- Wheelbase: 2,920 mm (115.0 in) (swb); 3,320 mm (130.7 in) (lwb)
- Length: 4,707 mm (185.3 in) (swb); 5,107 mm (201.1 in) (lwb)
- Width: 1,840 mm (72.4 in)
- Height: 1,940 mm (76.4 in) (normal roof); 2,430 mm (95.7 in) (high roof)

Chronology
- Predecessor: Volkswagen Type 2 (T3)
- Successor: Volkswagen Transporter (T5); Volkswagen Routan (U.S. & Canada)

The Volkswagen Transporter (T4), marketed in North America as the Volkswagen EuroVan, is a van produced by the German manufacturer Volkswagen Commercial Vehicles between 1990 and 2004, succeeding the Volkswagen Type 2 (T3) and superseded by the Volkswagen Transporter (T5).

== History ==
Introduced in 1990, the T4 was the first Volkswagen van to have a front-mounted, water-cooled engine. Prompted by the success of similar moves with their passenger cars, Volkswagen had toyed with the idea of replacing their air-cooled, rear-engined T2 vans with a front-engined, water-cooled design in the late 1970s. The reasons for deciding in 1980 to instead introduce a new rear-engined T3 are unclear. Thus, the introduction of a front-engined layout was delayed until the arrival of the T4. After a run of nearly 14 years, T4 production ceased in 2003, making it second only to the T1 for length of production in its home market.

== Chassis ==
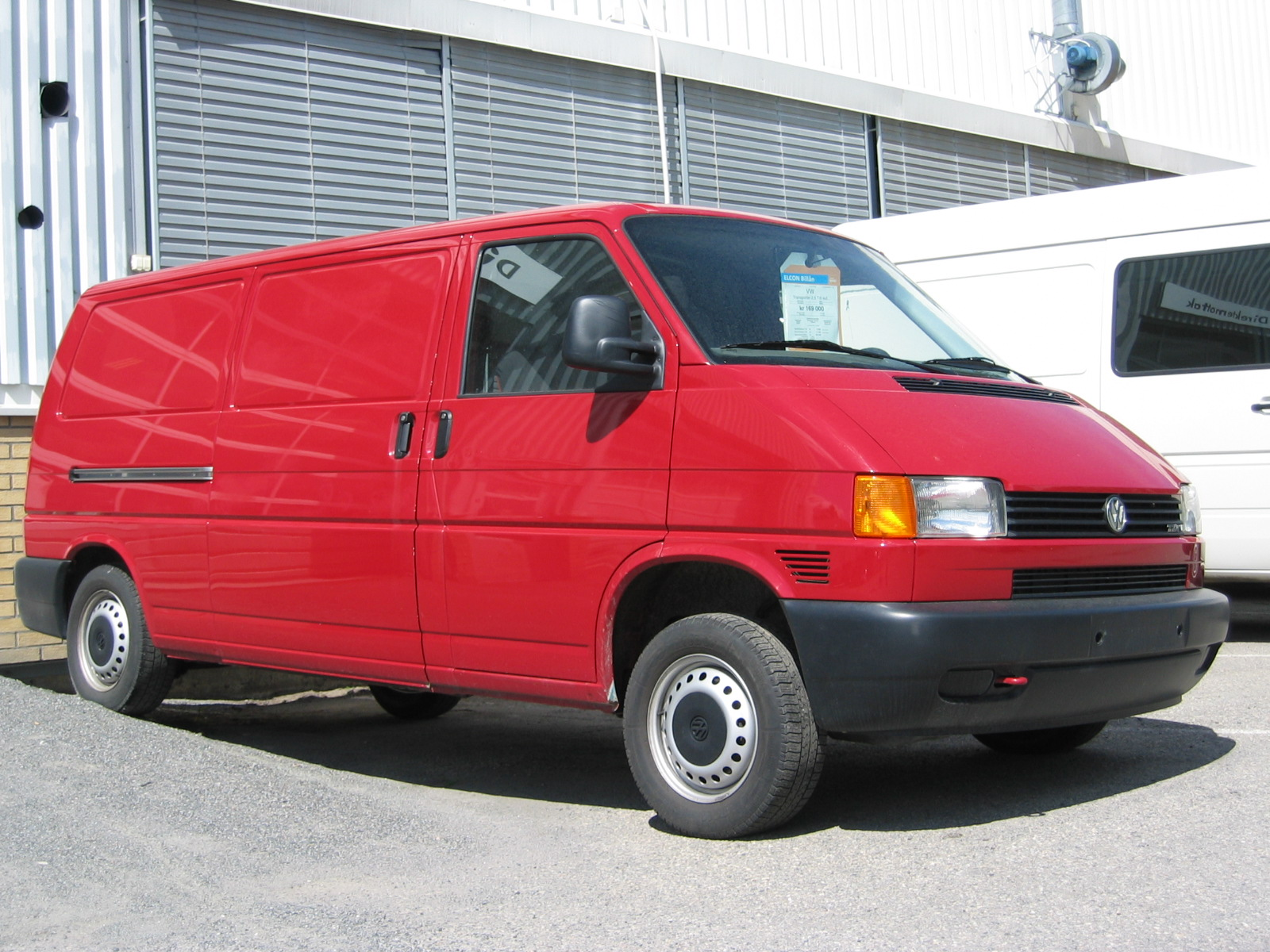
LWB short-nosed Panel Van

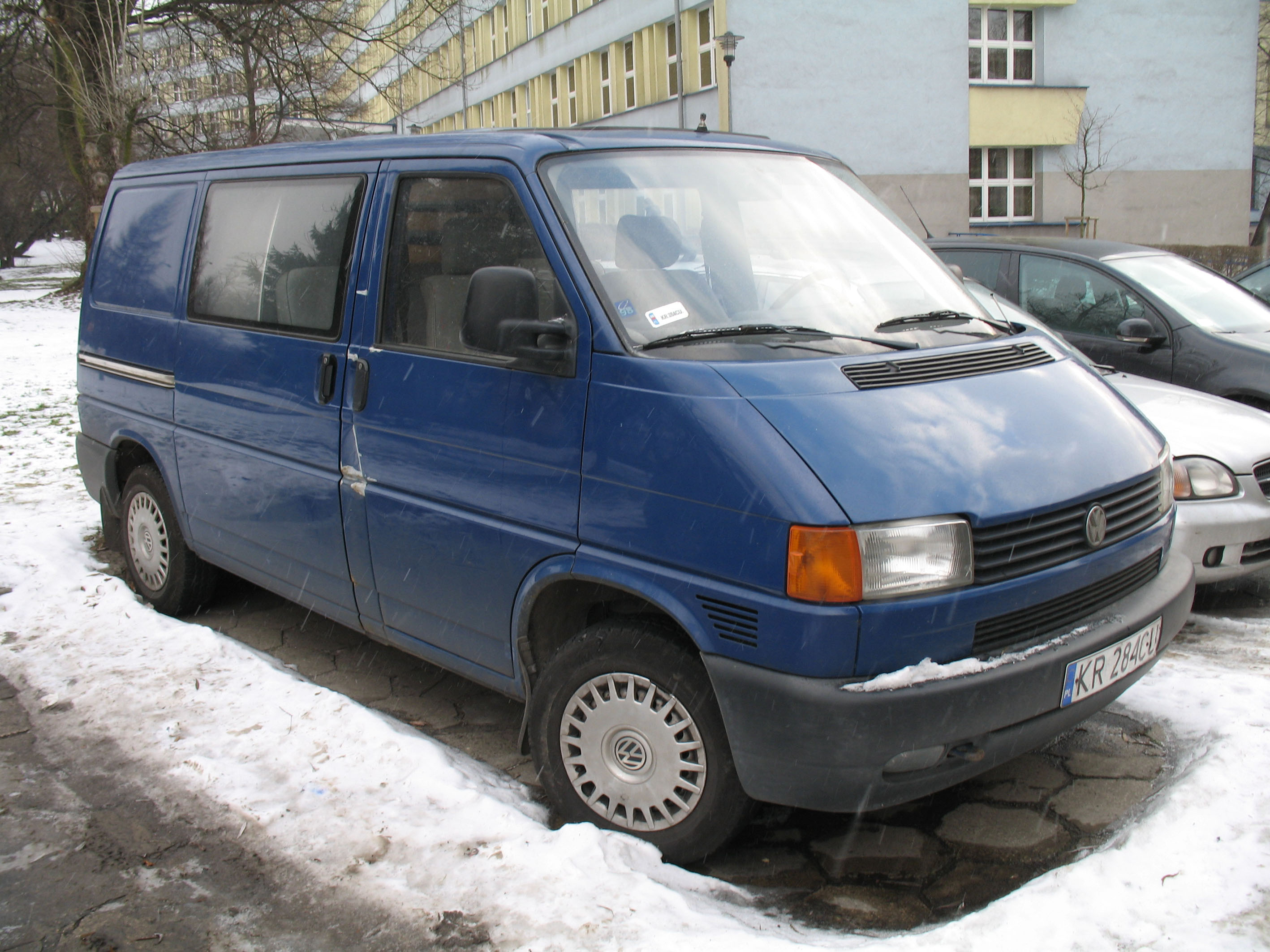
SWB short-nosed Kombi van

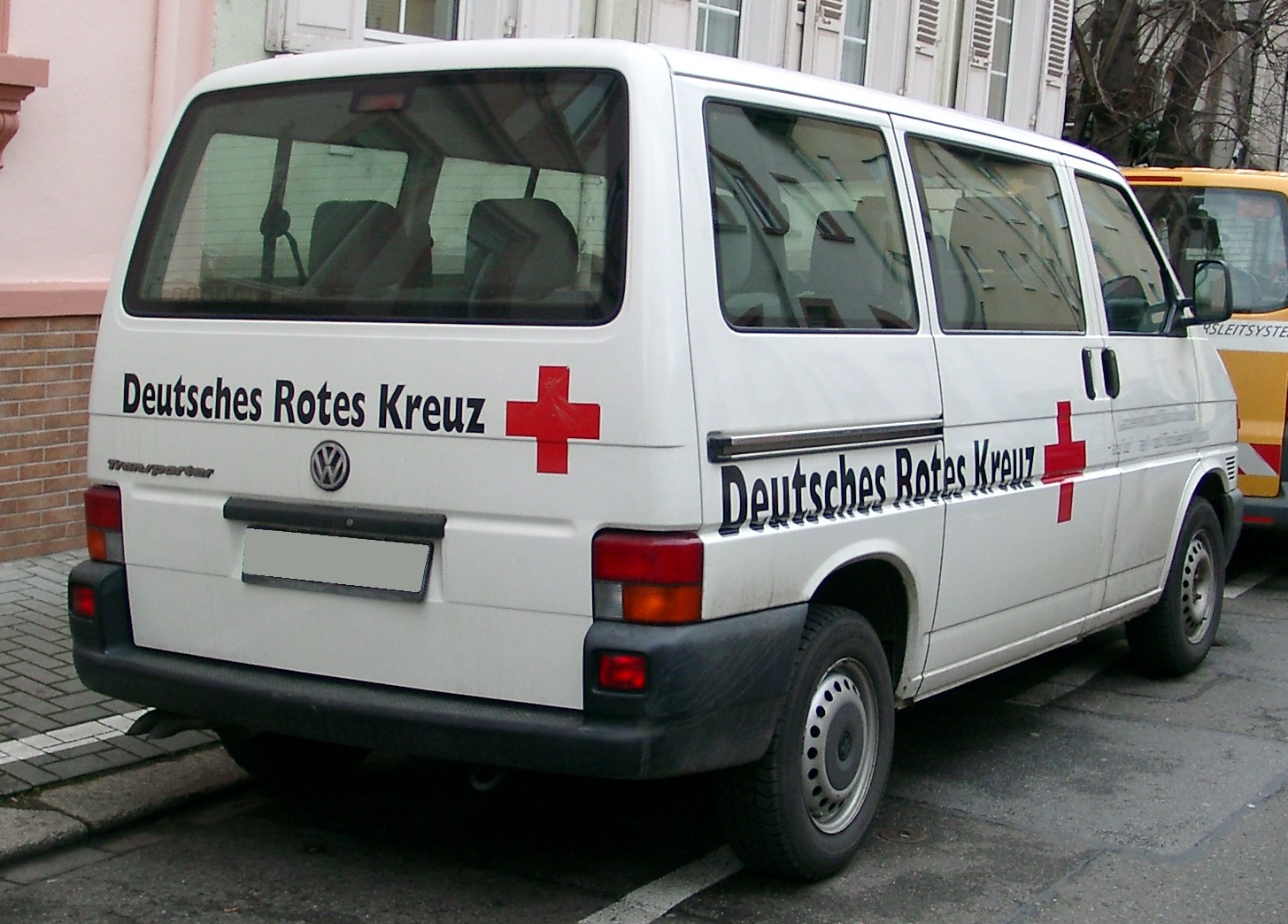
Volkswagen Transporter rear

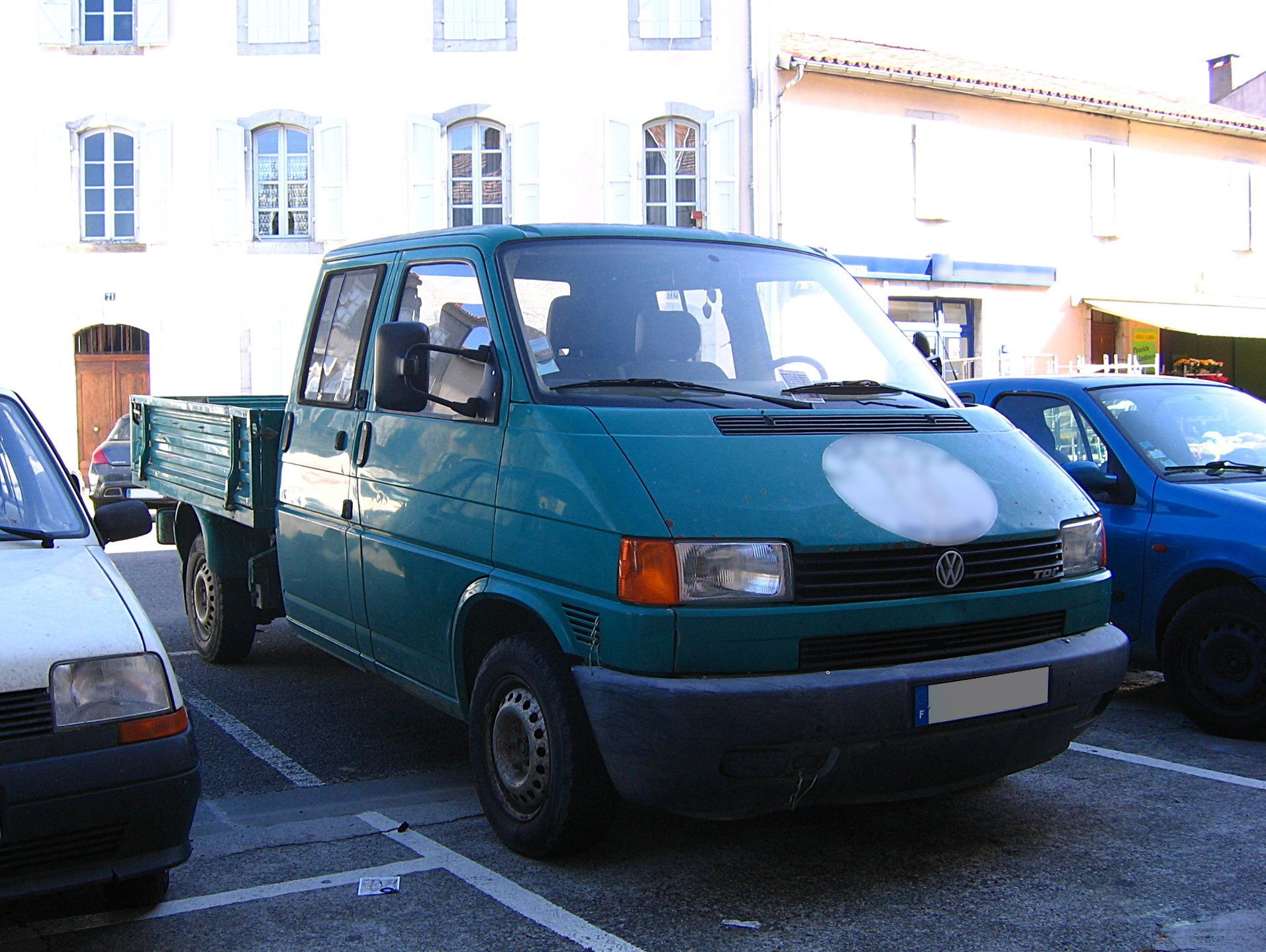
LWB short-nosed Double cab Pickup (aka Doka)

Part of the success of the T4 was its versatility. It was available in many forms and sizes as standard and formed the basis of many specialist vehicles, from buses to campervans to ambulances.

=== Wheelbase ===
Two standard wheelbases were available; a short (2920 mm) and a long (3320 mm) one.

=== Body types ===
==== Van ====
- Panel Van - without any windows behind the b-pillar; single row of seats
- Kombi or Half-Panel - with additional windows between the b and c-pillars; 2 rows of seats
- Caravelle, Multivan and (in the US) EuroVan - with windows all round; 3 rows of seats

==== Pickup ====
- Single cab - based on a SWB chassis
- Double cab - based on a LWB chassis (aka Doka, from the German: Doppelkabine)
- Razor back - with a hydraulic rear body that was produced between 1998 and 2000 in the UK

=== Roofs ===
Panel vans were available with two different roof heights; standard (1940mm) and high-top (2430mm). High-tops were only manufactured on the LWB chassis, although campervan conversions often have pop-top or (usually fibreglass) high-tops added to both SWB and LWB chassis.

=== Doors ===
Vans have either a single, roof-hinged "tailgate" or two "barn" doors at the rear and either a single (passenger side) or twin (both sides) sliding doors but they are commonly only on one side of the van, usually on the passenger side.

=== Long and short-nose ===
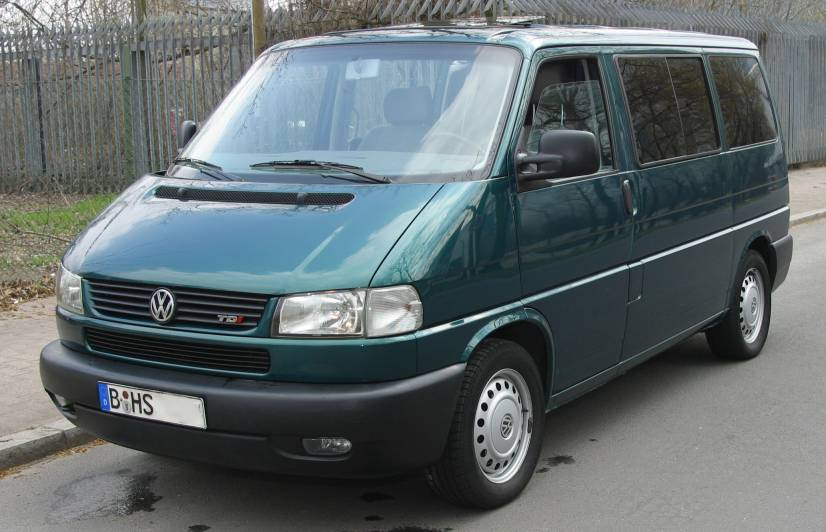
SWB long-nosed Multivan

There was one major facelift to the T4, in 1996, when a reshaped, longer front end was introduced. This was needed to fit the six-cylinder VR6 engine into the T4's engine bay. Initially, only Caravelles and Multivans were available with the longer nose, since these were the only models available with the VR6 engine.

The commercial variants continued to be produced with the shorter nose until 2003. However, campers and other specialist vehicles produced between 1996 and 2003 may have either the short or the long nose, depending on which model was used as the base vehicle. In keeping with the Type 2's naming convention, the short and long-nose versions are also informally known as T4a and T4b, respectively.

=== Four Wheel Drive (Syncro) ===
The T4 was also available with a permanent 4WD system that uses a Viscous coupling unit as a centre differential to regulate the distribution of torque to the rear axle. These models are called "syncro" and were available with the 1.9TD, 2.5Tdi and 2.5 petrol engines on all body types and both wheelbases. Some syncro models also have a mechanically locking rear differential. Since the rear differential precludes the placement of the spare wheel in the usual place under the body, syncro vans either store it inside the body or on an external, hinged bracket.

=== Campervans ===
The T4 is a very popular base for building a small to medium-sized camper and day-vans, both as self-build projects and for professional conversions. Volkswagen themselves also sold campervan versions of the T4. Outside of the US these were made by and named after their contractor, Westfalia-Werke. These Westfalia built campervans were named 'California', except in Canada where they were called simply 'Westfalia'. .

Winnebago Industries was the primary converter of VW T4 campers sold in the US.

== Engines ==
=== Petrol engines ===
Model	Engine ID code	Engine configuration	Engine displacement	DIN rated power at rpm	Torque at rpm	Years
1.8	PD	inline-4 SOHC 8v	1,798 cc (109.7 cu in)	67 PS (49 kW; 66 bhp) at 4,000	120 N⋅m (89 lb⋅ft) at 2,300||1990-1992	
2.0	AAC	inline-4 SOHC 8v	1,968 cc (120.1 cu in)	84 PS (62 kW; 83 bhp) at 4,300	159 N⋅m (117 lb⋅ft) at 2,200	1990–2003
2.5	AAF; ACU	inline-5 SOHC 10v	2,461 cc (150.2 cu in)	110 PS (81 kW; 108 bhp) at 4,500	190 N⋅m (140 lb⋅ft) at 2,200	1990–1997
2.5	AET; APL; AVT	inline-5 SOHC 10v	2,461 cc (150.2 cu in)	115 PS (85 kW; 113 bhp) at 4,500	200 N⋅m (148 lbf⋅ft) at 2,200	1997–2003
2.8 VR6	AES	VR6 DOHC 12v	2,792 cc (170.4 cu in)	140 PS (103 kW; 138 bhp) at 4,500	240 N⋅m (177 lbf⋅ft) at 3,000	1996–2000
2.8 VR6	AMV, AXK	VR6 DOHC 24v	2,792 cc (170.4 cu in)	204 PS (150 kW; 201 bhp) at 6,200	245 N⋅m (181 lbf⋅ft) at 2,500	2000–2003

=== Diesel engines ===
Indirect injection

Model	Engine ID code	Engine configuration	Engine displacement	DIN rated power at rpm	Torque at rpm	Years
1.9 D	1X	inline-4 SOHC 8v	1,896 cc (115.7 cu in)	61 PS (45 kW; 60 bhp) at 3,700	130 N⋅m (96 lbf⋅ft) at 1,700	1990–1995
1.9 TD	ABL	inline-4 SOHC 8v	1,896 cc (115.7 cu in)	68 PS (50 kW; 67 bhp) at 3,700	150 N⋅m (111 lbf⋅ft) at 1,800-2.000	1993–2003
2.4 D	AJA	inline-5 SOHC 10v	2,370 cc (144.6 cu in)	75 PS (55 kW; 74 bhp) at 3,700	150 N⋅m (111 lbf⋅ft) at 2.200-3,000	1997–2003
2.4 D	AAB	inline-5 SOHC 10v	2,370 cc (144.6 cu in)	78 PS (57 kW; 77 bhp) at 3,700	140 N⋅m (103 lbf⋅ft) at 2,600	1990–1998

Turbocharged Direct Injection

Model	Engine ID code	Engine configuration	Engine displacement	DIN rated power at rpm	Torque at rpm	Compression Ratio	Years
2.5 TDI	AJT; AYY	inline-5 SOHC 10v	2,461 cc (150.2 cu in)	88 PS (65 kW; 87 bhp) at 3,700	195 N⋅m (144 lb⋅ft) at 2,000-2,600	19.5	1998–2003
2.5 TDI	ACV; AUF; AYC; AXL	inline-5 SOHC 10v	2,461 cc (150.2 cu in)	102 PS (75 kW; 101 bhp) at 3,500	250 N⋅m (184 lb⋅ft) at 1,900-2,300	19.5	1995–2004
2.5 TDI	AHY; AXG	inline-5 SOHC 10v	2,461 cc (150.2 cu in)	151 PS (111 kW; 149 bhp) at 4,000	295 N⋅m (218 lb⋅ft) at 1,900-3000	19.0	1998–2003

== Enthusiasts' groups ==
Due largely to its versatility, as well as popularity as a campervan, the Volkswagen Transporter (including the T4) has an extensive following amongst enthusiasts. Meetings are held regularly throughout the year in countries across Europe and there are several Internet forums dedicated to T4 owners and enthusiasts.

In May 2010, the German enthusiasts of the T4 held a celebration of the 20th anniversary of the production of the first T4. Several hundred T4s took part with vans from as far afield as Russia, France, Spain, central Europe and the Nordic countries.

== T4 in North America (EuroVan) ==
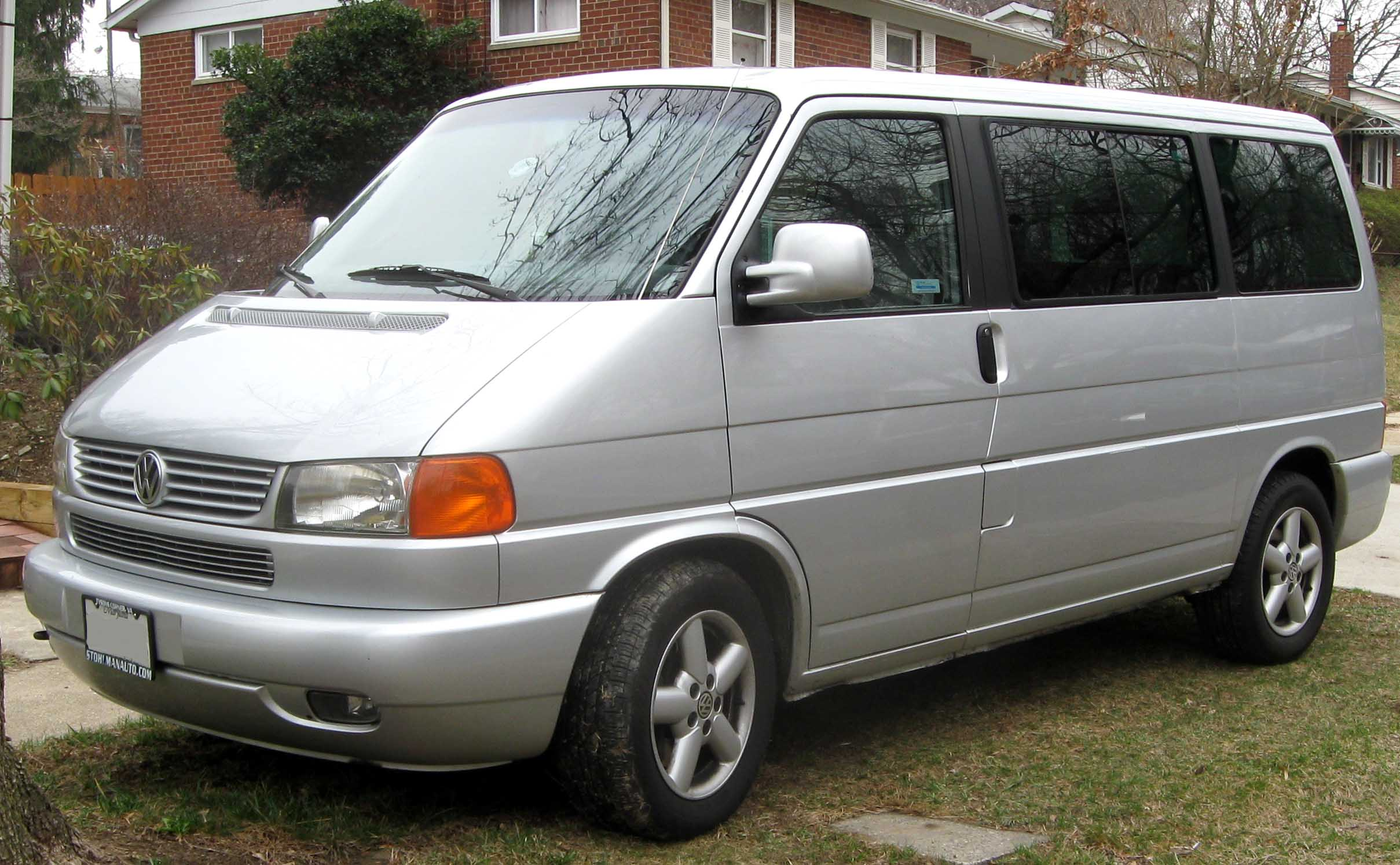
Volkswagen EuroVan (US)

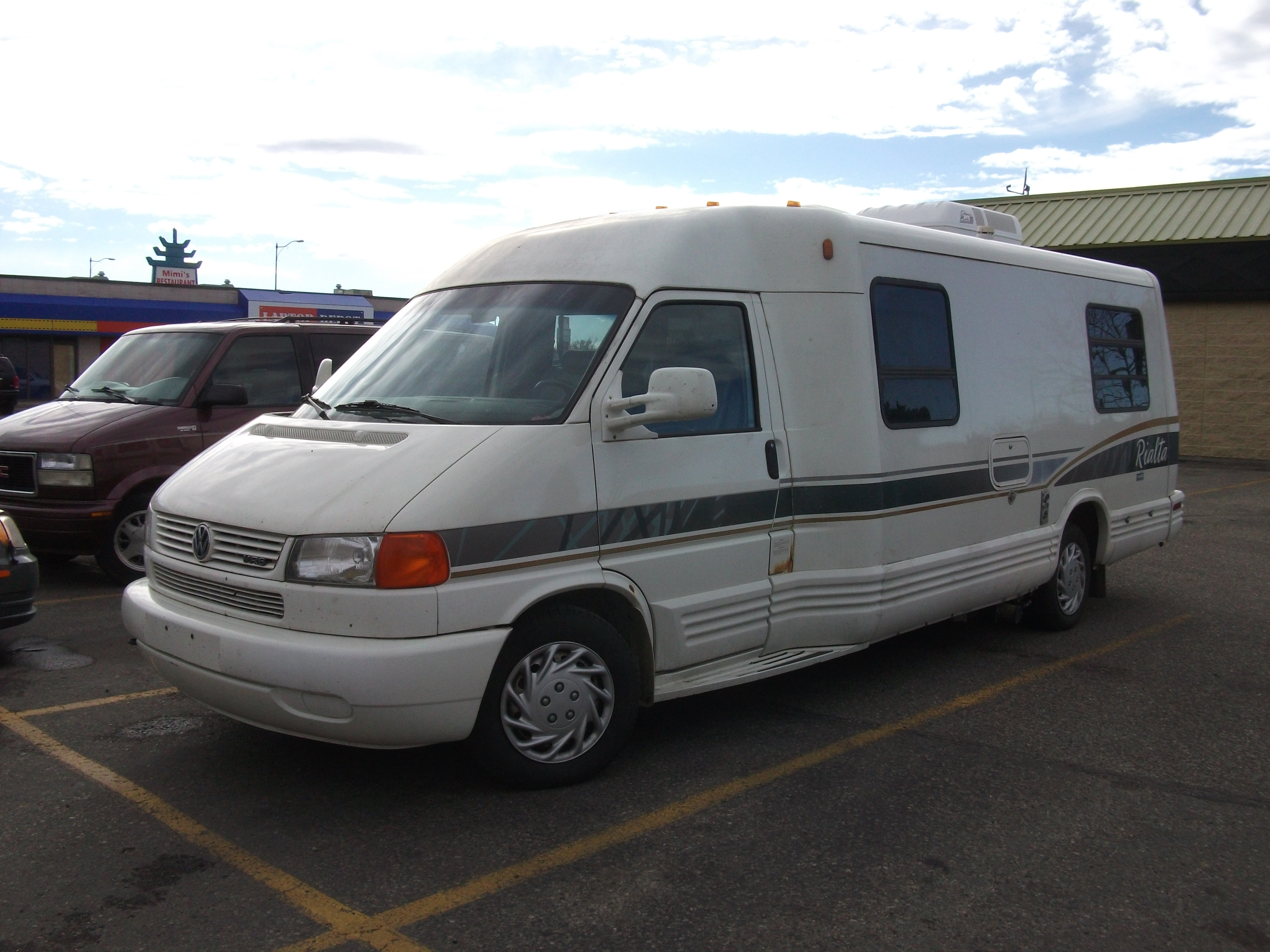
Volkswagen EuroVan VR6 Rialta

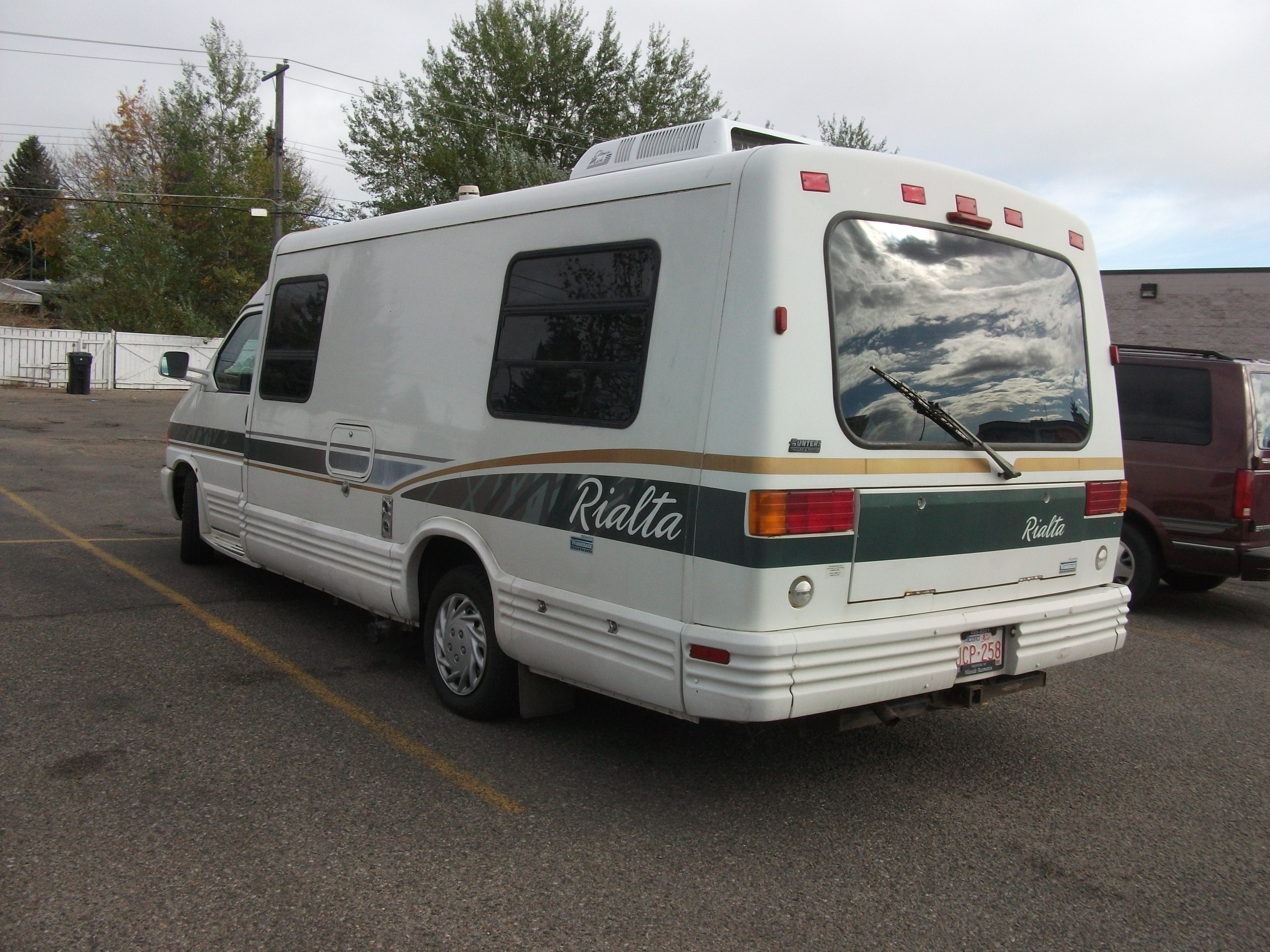
Volkswagen EuroVan VR6 Rialta rear

Volkswagen marketed the European manufactured Transporter T4 from 1992-2003 as the EuroVan, beginning with the short wheelbase EuroVan 5-cylinder passenger models (CL, GL, GLS, and MV) marketed for the 1993 model year. Smaller than a standard American delivery van, but larger than an American or Japanese passenger minivan, Volkswagen used the tagline "EuroVan: There's nothing mini about it". Sales continued in Canada and Mexico after 2003, and reintroduced EuroVan passenger models in the United States for the 1999 model year with a VR6 engine as standard, discontinuing the T4 worldwide after 2003. The manual gearbox was not offered in North America with the VR6 engine.

Volkswagen imported the short wheelbase EuroVan 5-cylinder petrol engine passenger models (CL, GL, GLS, MV Weekender and Westfalia Camperised) to Canada from 1991 to 1996. The 77 hp 2.4 litre diesel engine was optional in Canada between 1993 and 1996. The long wheelbase version was also on offer in 1992 only as a 10 seaters CL or GL model trim. Kombi and crewcab pickup versions (sold as Transporter) were also available in 1992. A panel version (LWB only) was sold from 1993 to 1997.

The EuroVan Camper by Winnebago was introduced to the United States and Canada in 1995 with the five-cylinder engine, and upgraded to the VR6 for the 1997-2003 models. These were only available on the longer 3,320 mm (131 in) wheelbase T4. These small pop top camper vans are unique in North America and have developed a cult following.

Winnebago also marketed three small Class C motorhomes with the forward cab of the T4/EuroVan called the Rialta, Vista, and Sunstar (Itasca branded). The Rialta was available in 1995-1996 with the five-cylinder engine, in 1997-2001 with the AES version of the VR6, and in 2002-2005 with the AXK engine. The Vista and Sunstar were only produced in 2002-2004, all using the AXK engine.

In the United States, the models were:

- the seven-seat EuroVan CL, GL, and GLS
- the EuroVan MV, in which the second row of seats face the rear and are removable, the third row converts into a bed, a folding table in the passenger area, window curtains, and a fluorescent lamp above table.
- the EuroVan MV Weekender, an MV plus a Westfalia conversion that adds a pop-top roof, a second overhead bed, bug screens for side windows and rear hatch, full set of curtains, auxiliary battery, fluorescent interior lights and under seat thermoelectric cooler.
- the EuroVan Camper, which is the long wheelbase commercial van converted by Winnebago Industries to include a pop-top roof, two two-person beds, seating for four (plus optional single or two-person seats in the middle), a one cubic foot refrigerator that runs on propane, DC, or AC, a propane furnace, a closet, cabinets, sink with cold water and a grey water tank, a two-burner propane stove, two two-person dinette tables, coach battery, house lighting, and the two front bucket seats made to swivel around to face the dinette/kitchen area. The 2000 EVC is 17 feet (5,200 mm) long.

== See also ==
- Volkswagen Transporter – for an overview of the Transporter generations
